= South Western Sydney =

Region of Sydney, Australia

- Region
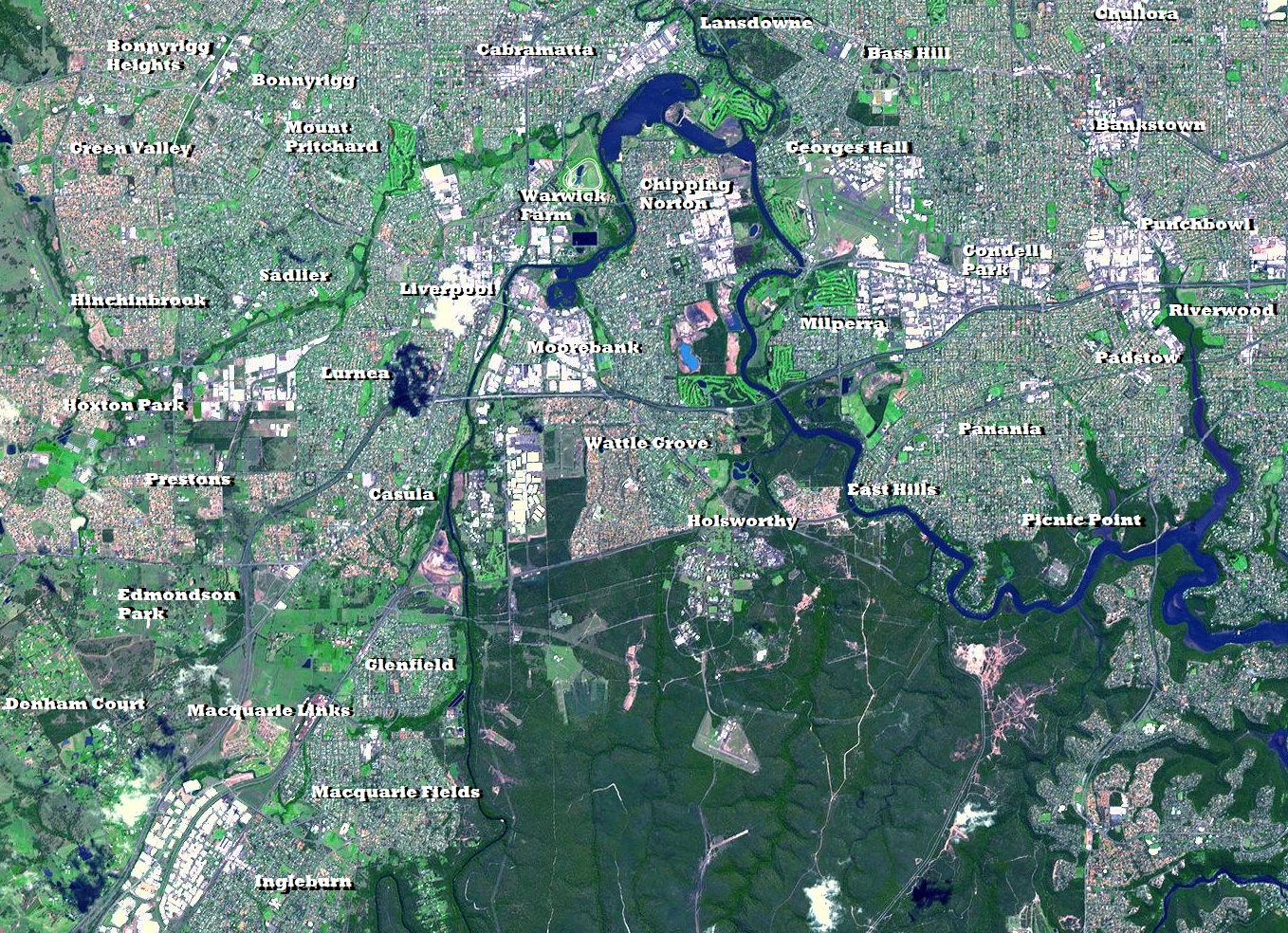
- The core area of Sydney's south-western suburbs
- Country: Australia
- State: New South Wales
- City: Sydney
- LGA: Camden, Campbelltown, Fairfield, Liverpool, Wollondilly

Government
  - State electorate: Cabramatta, Camden, Campbelltown, Liverpool, Macquarie Fields, Wollondilly
  - Federal division: Banks, Barton, Blaxland, Fowler, Hughes, Hume, Macarthur, McMahon, Watson, Werriwa
Regions around South Western Sydney
	Greater Western Sydney
Blue Mountains	South Western Sydney	Southern Sydney
Macarthur

South Western Sydney is a region of the city of Sydney, New South Wales, Australia. It is situated in the south-west of the larger Sydney metropolitan area, and is part of the predominantly working class area of Greater Western Sydney. In the early 2010s, urban development has occurred in places like Camden and Campbelltown. Areas such as Leppington, spanning Liverpool, Camden and Campbelltown councils, had higher number of families. In 2004, Leppington was identified as part of Sydney's South West Growth Centre. Edmondson Park, being part of the South West Growth Centre, is also expected to see significant growth and development over the next 10 years.

There are a number of different boundaries and definitions for Sydney's South-West with majority of definitions including the suburbs within City of Liverpool as well as surrounding areas. This can also include the Macarthur region which is often referred to as 'Outer South-West', particularly referring to the local government area of City of Campbelltown as well as Camden Council and occasionally also the Wollondilly Shire. City of Canterbury-Bankstown is also often included in definitions of Sydney's South-West and usually referenced as being 'Inner South-West'. In the broadest sense, South-Western Sydney can also include Fairfield City Council as it is south of Prospect Reservoir even though geographically the council is west of Sydney CBD and not south-west.

Geographically, the region lies in the Cumberland Plain. The heritage-listed Warragamba Dam, the primary reservoir for water supply for Sydney, is located in the south western suburbs. The region features the Holsworthy Barracks, a large Australian Army reserve where training exercises frequently occur. Several institutions have 'South Western Sydney' in their title, including: South Western Sydney Local Health District, South Western Sydney Institute and South Western Sydney Clinical School. Englorie Park, in south-western Sydney, is the smallest suburb by area in the state of New South Wales.

== History ==
=== Indigenous ===
Radiocarbon dating suggests human activity occurred in the Sydney metropolitan area from around 30,000 years ago. The Darug people lived in the area that was south western Sydney before European settlement regarded the region as rich in food from the river and forests. For more than 30,000 years, Aboriginal people from the Gandangara tribe have lived in the Fairfield area. Clans of the Tharawal roamed over a wide area from Botany Bay to the Shoalhaven River and inland to Campbelltown. They lived a nomadic hunter-gatherer lifestyle, eating local foods (bush tucker) such as kangaroo, fish, yams and berries. They made tools out of stones, bones and shells to help them build bark shelters, canoes and possum-skin clothing. The Holsworthy bushland still withholds many indigenous sites and has been referred to as "Sydney's Kakadu". There are more than 500 significant Tharawal sites in the area, including campsites, tool-making sites, and rock art. The art is mostly engravings of hands, boomerangs, animals, birds, and fish.

Menangle Park was originally home to the Tharawal people, and it was they who gave the name, transcribed as Manangle or Manhangle, to a small lagoon on the west bank of the Nepean River, which was important to the Tharawal both for its consistent water supply as well as the fish and yabbies that could be caught there. In a rock art site called Bull Cave near Campbelltown, the Dharug people drew a number of cattle with pronounced horns. The Dharug cowpasture tribes described the cattle to British explorers and in 1795 the British found a herd of around 60 cattle grazing in the area now known as Camden.

=== Colonial era ===
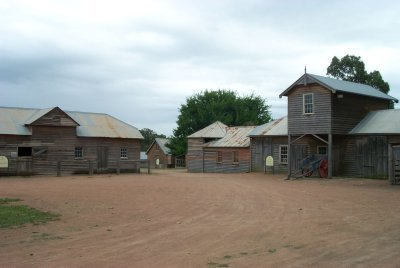
Camden Park Estate, built from 1819 to 1840

In February 1793, the Auburn area was established as the first free-agricultural settlement thanks to Governor Phillip's repeated applications to the British government for free settlers. In 1795, Matthew Flinders and George Bass explored up the Georges River for about 20 miles beyond what had been previously surveyed, and reported favourably to Governor John Hunter of the land on its banks. The earliest recorded white settlement in the Fairfield district is described in William Bradley's Journal where he noted an expedition from Rose Hill to Prospect Creek to determine whether Prospect Creek led to Botany Bay. In 1789, Governor Arthur Phillip probed the country between Salt Pan Creek beginning at Prospect Creek. The District of Bankstown was named by Governor Hunter in 1797 in honour of botanist Sir Joseph Banks. The area remained very rural until residential and suburban development followed the development of the Bankstown railway line with the passing of the Marrickville to Burwood Road Railway Act by the NSW Parliament in 1890, extending the rail line from Marrickville Station (later Sydenham Station) to Burwood Road (later Belmore Station) by 1895.

In 1798, First Fleet Captain George Johnston received a land grant and constructed his first home located near Prospect Creek, close to Henry Lawson Drive and Beatty Parade. The first incursions and eventual land grants in the area by Europeans led to increasing tensions, culminating in a confrontation between Europeans and a group of Aboriginal people led by Tedbury, the son of Pemulwuy, in what is now Punchbowl in 1809. However, following Tedbury's death in 1810, resistance to European settlement generally ended.

In the 1800s, the area around Prestons was known as "Cross Roads". The name appears to originate from 1821, when a notice published by John Oxley, the Surveyor General of New South Wales stated that "this Cross Road from Windsor ends in the new Bringelly Road". In 1800, just beside Prospect Creek, Lieutenant John Shortland from the First Fleet acquired an initial grant of 100 acres (40 ha) over the northern part of Lansdowne Reserve which he increased to 380 acres (150 ha). In 1848, German explorer Ludwig Leichhardt and politician Sir Henry Parkes cooled their feet in Prospect Creek in Carramar. Very early relations with British settlers were cordial but as farmers started clearing and fencing the land affecting food resources in the area, clashes between the groups arose until 1816 when a number of indigenous people were massacred and the remainder retreated from direct conflict with the settlers.

In 1801, Governor King ordered soldiers to fire on the aborigines to keep them from settler's properties. By 1815, Governor Macquarie declared a state of open warfare against aborigines in the Georges River area and forbade them carrying weapons within a mile of any British settlement. Ultimately, the British prevailed. The Liverpool Offtake Reservoir was constructed in 1890 to supply the township of Liverpool, as part of the Upper Nepean Scheme. The Church of the Holy Innocents was opened in 1850 by William Munro. Alexander Riley (1778–1833) was a merchant and pastoralist who in 1809 was granted 3,000 acres (12 km^{2}) of land and called his estate Raby. In March 1895, a petition was submitted to the NSW Colonial Government by 109 residents of the Bankstown area, requesting the establishment of the "Municipal District of Bankstown" under the Municipalities Act, 1867. On 19 January 1898, the Camden Municipal Council proposed to establish a cottage hospital for the municipality.

=== Early 20th century ===
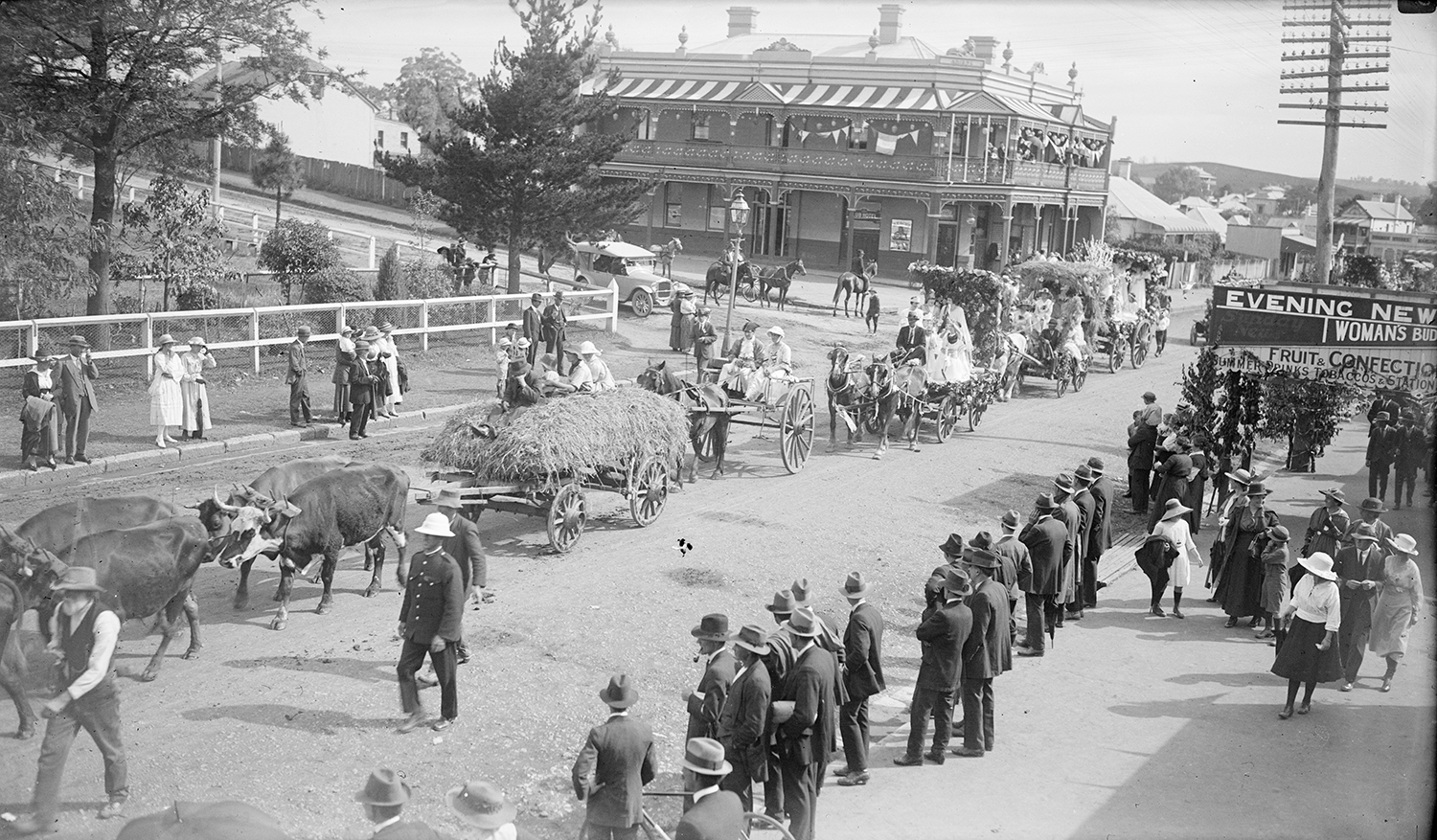
Campbelltown, 1920

In the first half of the 20th century, venues such as Latty's Pleasure Grounds, the Butterfly Hall, and Hollywood Park at Lansvale were popular among tourists due to the area's rural feel, so popular in fact that the first games of Rugby league football in Australia, in early 1908, were trial games that took place at Latty's Pleasure Grounds. Liverpool Hospital was founded on a portion of land beside the Georges River, making it the second oldest hospital in Australia. Hammondville was originally a settlement for destitute families during the Great Depression. During the Great Depression, Kentlyn became something of a shantytown for families who had lost their homes. During World War II, Bankstown Airport was established as a key strategic air base to support the war effort and the control of Bankstown Airport was handed to US Forces. Also during the war, Bass Hill was the location for a small transmitting station that was owned and operated by the RAAF. It was located on the corner of Manuka Crescent & Johnston Road.

In World War II, there was a soldiers' settlement at Milperra which consisted mostly of poultry and horticultural enterprises. In 1942 a command bunker (Sydney Air Defence Headquarters) of semi underground construction was established in Bankstown. The primary use of the Sydney Air Defence Headquarters was the location, tracking and interception of all planes in the eastern area of the South West Pacific. From 1948 to 1955 workers camps were set up at Potts Hill to accommodate the European migrant workers who were indentured from the many displaced persons brought to Australia after World War II. The Australian Legion of Ex-Servicemen and Women sponsored the mass production of housing at Panania beginning from 1946 with the construction of 34 houses. During World War II, Picnic Point National Park was the location of a remote receiving station and operations bunker that was owned and operated by the RAAF. In October 1944, the Royal Navy (United Kingdom) opened a hospital (Royal Naval Hospital, Herne Bay) at Riverwood to treat wounded members of the British Pacific Fleet in the vacated buildings.

=== Contemporary period ===
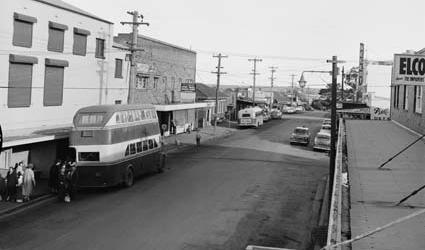
Restwell Street, Bankstown, 1956

Until the 1950s, Liverpool was still a satellite town with an agricultural economy based on poultry farming and market gardening. However the urban sprawl of Sydney across the Cumberland Plain soon reached Liverpool, and it became an outer suburb of metropolitan Sydney with a strong working-class presence and manufacturing facilities. At the time of its opening by the mayor R. J. Schofield on 26 September 1958, the Campsie Library was reputed to be the largest municipal library in Sydney. Campbelltown was designated in the early 1960s as a satellite city by the New South Wales Planning Authority, and a regional capital for the south west of Sydney. The Milperra College of Advanced Education was established in 1974, bringing tertiary education to south-western Sydney, where it then became the Bankstown campus of Western Sydney University in 1989. In January 1975, tenders for the first homes in the Housing Commission's "Kentlyn" subdivision were called but the name Airds was not approved until May 1976.

From the 1970s to 1990s, a small amusement park named Magic Kingdom operated in Lansvale on the banks of the creek and was a popular attraction for visitors. In the 1960s and 1970s, migration from south-east Asia as a result of the Vietnam War transformed Cabramatta into a thriving Asian community. Also in the 1970s, an influx of Middle Eastern immigrants, namely Lebanese people, settled in Lidcombe, Bankstown and the surrounding suburbs. Bankstown's city status was proclaimed in 1980 in the presence of Queen Elizabeth II, becoming the "City of Bankstown". In September 1984, on Father's Day, members of rival motorbike gangs the Comanchero and the Bandidos had a showdown in Revesby. This altercation has since been called the 'Milperra Massacre'.

The Oran Park Town housing development replaced Oran Park Raceway, which stood from 1962 – 2010. The suburb has often become an example of urban sprawl. In 2015, the Abbott government granted 12,000 extra humanitarian visas to persecuted Christians, largely the Assyrians, in the war-torn Middle Eastern countries, which were admitted to Australia as part of its one-off humanitarian intake, with half of them primarily settling in Fairfield and also Liverpool. A 2015 review of local government boundaries by the NSW Government Independent Pricing and Regulatory Tribunal recommended that the City of Canterbury merge with the City of Bankstown to form a new council with an area of 110 square kilometres (42 sq mi) and support a population of approximately 351,000.

In 2019–2020, a tract of dry grass was set ablaze by illegal fireworks, resulting in a bushfire in the area around Cecil Hills. In 2023, the Liverpool reservoir site was upgraded with a new water tank and pumping station, adding 115 megalitres of reservoir capacity to supply the growing suburbs of south-west Sydney. The new pumping station superseded the role of the nearby Bonnyrigg Pumping Station, which was built in 1941. In June 2023, the suburb boundaries with Campbelltown and Airds were amended, with Bradbury losing some area to Campbelltown but gaining some area from Airds. However, in November 2024, this boundary was changed again, with Bradbury losing the areas east of this boundary to Airds. In November 2024, Eschol Park's boundary with Eagle Vale was amended, with the boundary to follow the entirety of Eagle Vale Drive. As a result, Eschol Park gained all areas of Eagle Vale that were west of Eagle Vale Drive.

== Geography ==
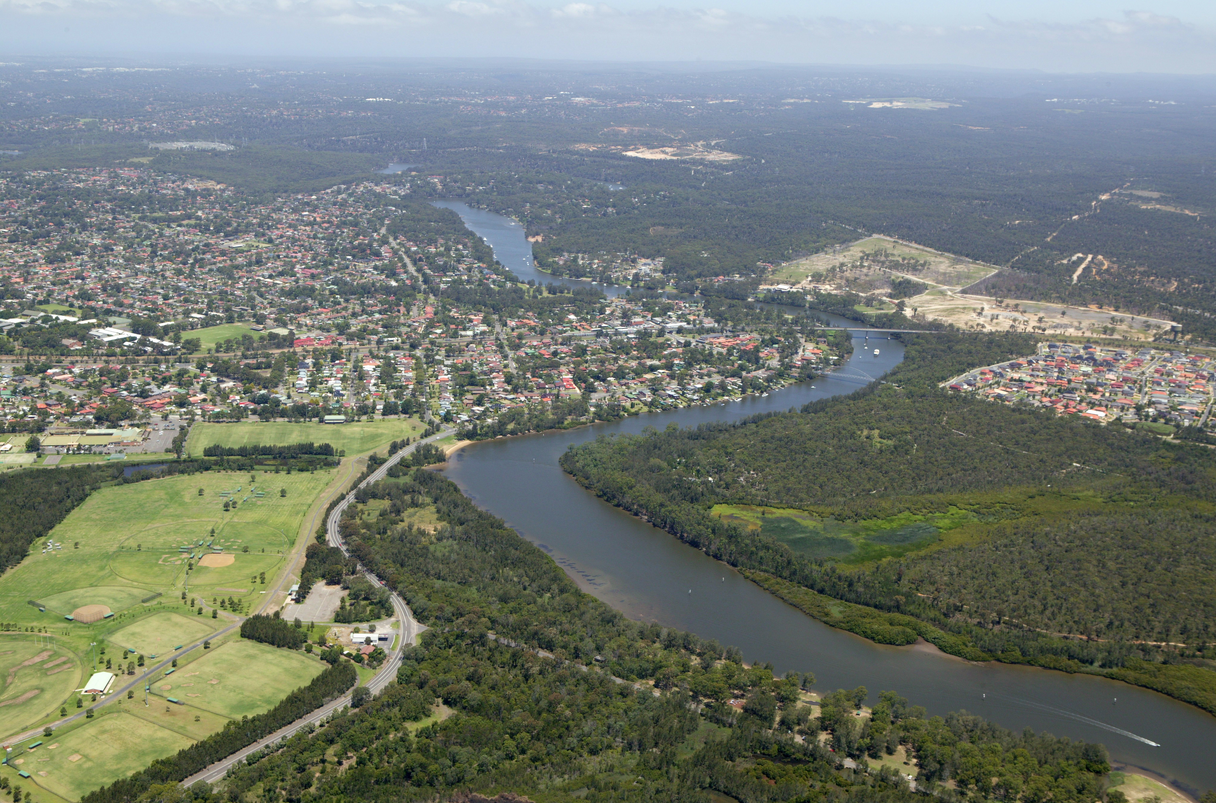
A bird's eye view of East Hills and Milperra showing the railway bridge crossing Georges River

South Western Sydney predominantly lies on the Cumberland Plain and is relatively flat in contrast to the above regions, with most of it sitting on Triassic shales and sandstones with low rolling hills and wide valleys in a rain shadow area. In 1820s, Peter Cunningham described the country west of Parramatta and Liverpool as "a fine timbered country, perfectly clear of bush, through which you might, generally speaking, drive a gig in all directions, without any impediment in the shape of rocks, scrubs, or close forest". This confirmed earlier accounts by Governor Arthur Phillip, who suggested that the trees were "growing at a distance of some twenty to forty feet from each other, and in general entirely free from brushwood..."

The main plant communities in the region are sclerophyll grassy woodlands (i.e. savannas). The grassy woodlands contain eucalyptus trees which are usually in open woodlands that have sclerophyllous shrubs and sparse grass in the understory. Leacock Regional Park in Casula is home to one of the last remaining stands of Cumberland Plain Woodland. In 1795, an early settler named Hatfield referred to the area now known as Cabramatta as "Moonshine Run" because the forest was so dense that moonlight could not penetrate it, discouraging further exploration by settlers. These thick woodlands occupied the marshy, flood-prone lower reaches of Cabramatta Creek and formed a closed riparian forest that extended as far as present-day Cabramatta Road. Although by most customary definitions, Earlwood falls into the traditional region of South Western Sydney or Canterbury-Bankstown, it sits at the far eastern end of that region.

The southwest of Sydney is drained by the Georges River, flowing north from its source near Appin, towards Liverpool and then turning east towards Botany Bay. The centre of the Sydney basin is located beneath Fairfield. The disjointed sandstone lenses within the Bringelly Shale become thicker and more prominent from the Western Sydney Regional Park southwards, shaping the hilly landscape between Campbelltown and Picton. Namely found on Old Hume Highway, approaching Picton, the sandstone cliffs that become thicker are roughly around 200 metres (660 ft) in height. The steep banks of the sandstone lentils influence the flora of the Cumberland Plain Woodland, with such escarpments being observed in Western Sydney Dry Rainforest areas. The region has thus far recorded two earthquakes in history – one occurring in Appin on 17 March 1999, and one in Picton on 9 March 1973. The Picton earthquake had a damage total of $2.8 million, with some minor damage in Bowral and Wollongong.

=== Climate ===
The region of South Western Sydney experiences a humid subtropical climate (Köppen climate classification: Cfa) with the annual temperatures having an average maximum of 23 °C (73 °F) and a minimum of 12 °C (54 °F) A record low of −2.3 °C (27.9 °F) was recorded at Bankstown on 12 July 2002, while a record high of 47.0 °C (116.6 °F) was recorded on 4 January 2020.

== Demographics ==
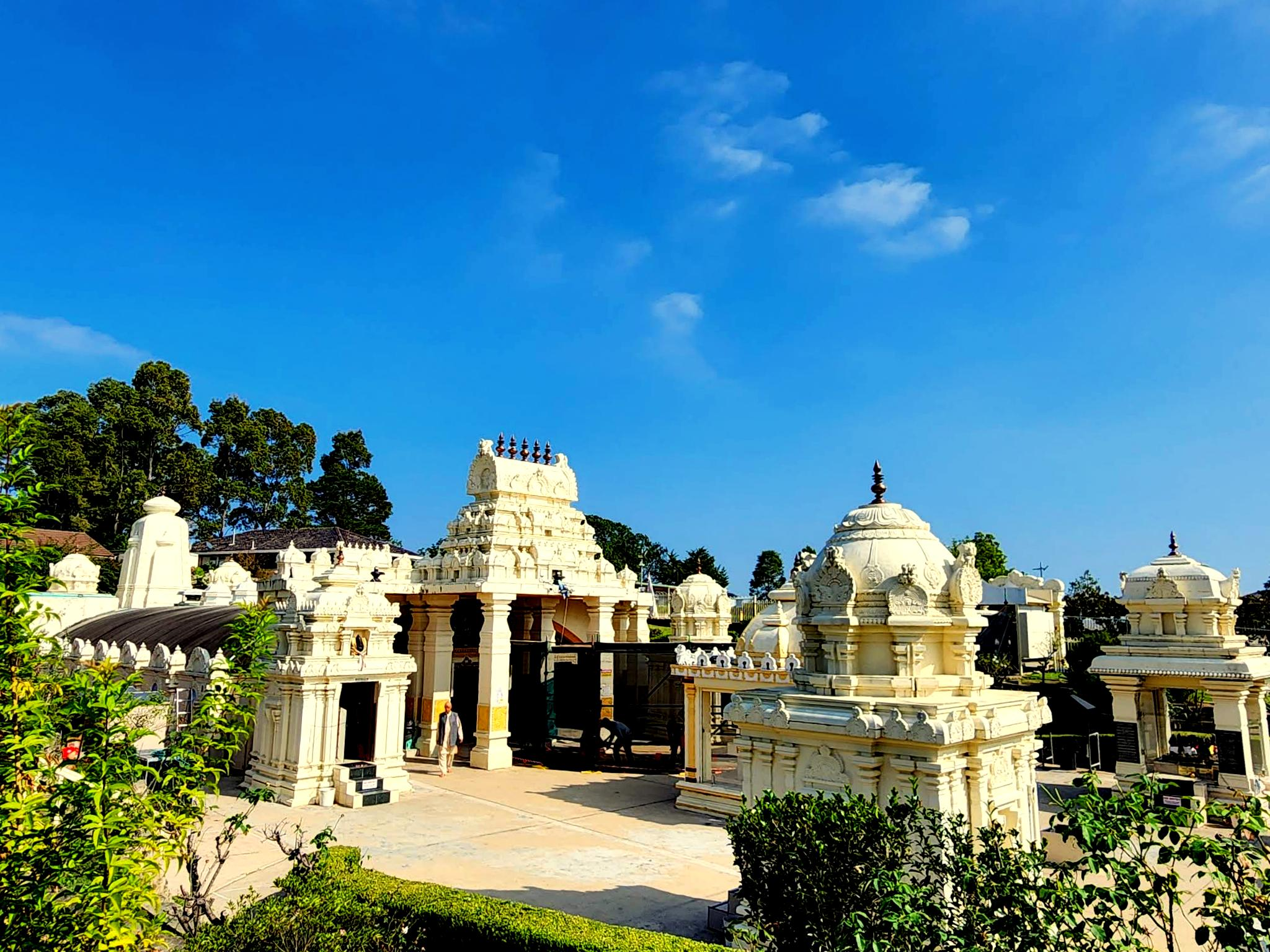
Shri Shiva Mandir, a Hindu temple in Minto

Cabramatta is made up of 87.7% of people from non-English speaking backgrounds, the highest anywhere in Australia (excluding remote indigenous communities). Other Western Sydney suburbs, such as Fairfield, Bankstown and Canley Vale, are also over 80%. The south western suburbs have become Sydney's so-called believer belt, with a high proportion of believers found in a band of suburbs that span the cities of Liverpool, Fairfield, and Canterbury-Bankstown. The proportion of residents in Liverpool City Council who stated a religious affiliation with Islam was in excess of four times the national average; and the proportion of residents with no religion slightly less than one–third the national average. At the 2011 Census, in the City of Bankstown, the proportion of residents in the Bankstown local government area who stated their ancestry as Lebanese was in excess of eight times the national average. Meanwhile, as at the Census date, the area was linguistically diverse, with Arabic or Vietnamese languages spoken in 30% of households, both languages approximately seven times the national averages.

According to the Bureau of Statistics, areas with the highest percentage of Christians were found in south-western suburbs such as, Grasmere (82.3%), Theresa Park (81.1%) and Abbotsbury (81%), with the most popular denominations being Catholic and Anglican, respectively. Buddhism was the common response in the suburbs of Cabramatta, Canley Vale and Canley Heights, with 43.0%, 37.1% and 38.4% adhering to it, respectively. The proportion of residents who stated an affiliation with Islam in the City of Bankstown in the 2011 Census was in excess of eleven times the national average.

In 2015, Liverpool had the highest number of registered firearms in Sydney, with 4,689 owned by 1,732 residents. Chester Hill and Sefton, only partially located in Sydney's southwest, ranked second-highest with 4,505 registered firearms.

== Economy ==
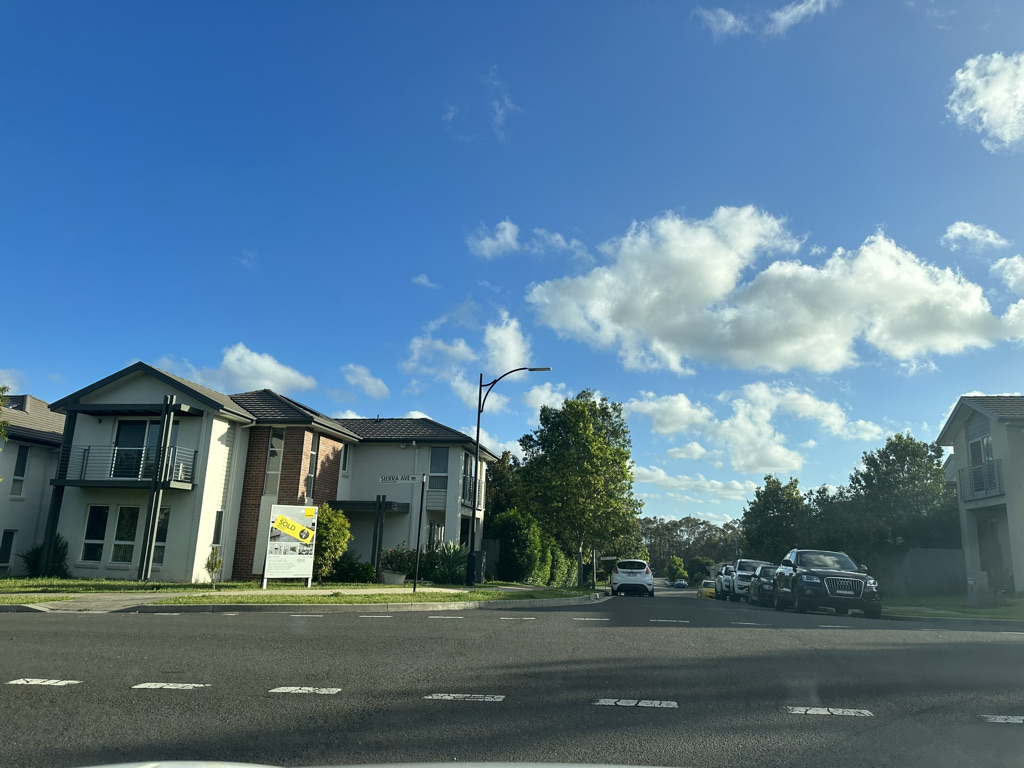
The moderately affluent suburb of Middleton Grange

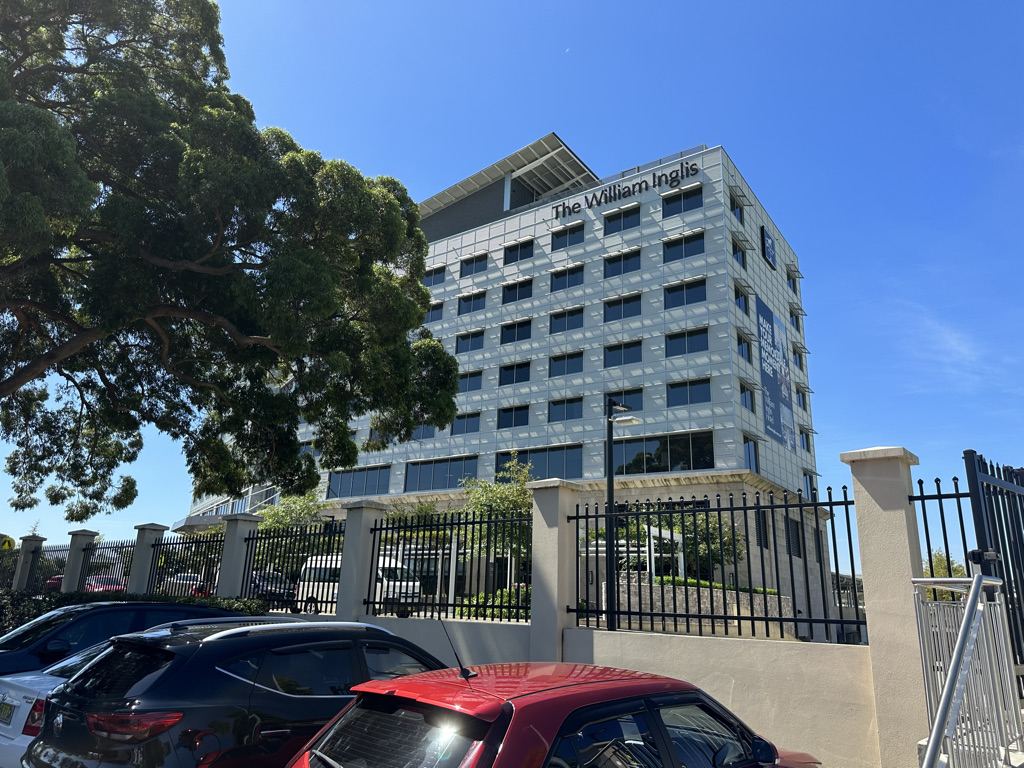
The William Inglis Hotel supports business and tourism in south-western Sydney.

Denham Court is one of the most affluent in south-west Sydney, with the median property price standing at $1.60 million in January 2015, over three times higher than the median of properties in surrounding suburbs. It is sometimes referred to as "the south-western millionaires' row". Other affluent suburbs in the area include, Edmondson Park, Cecil Hills, Elizabeth Hills, Middleton Grange, Carnes Hill, Oran Park, Leppington and Spring Farm, among others. Macquarie Links is an affluent suburb that has been restricted to local residents since late 2003. A gated community, residents there chose to close the gates at the estate's only entrance in 2003, as this had dramatically reduced the number of break-ins and vehicle thefts. Security guards log the number plates of all vehicles entering the suburb, and locals carry ID cards as part of efforts to deter criminal activity.

Seven of the top ten suburbs for home purchasers were more than 20 kilometres (12 mi) west of the Sydney CBD, which included areas with high construction activity such as Liverpool, which has become Sydney's most popular area for home buyers, with more sales than any other suburb. In Camden Council area there were 2,168 residential buildings approved to be built in the financial year 2021–22. Lower middle class and working class neighbourhoods are mainly concentrated near the heart of the central business district areas of Cabramatta and Canley Vale. Landsdowne, Blairmount, Wiley Park, Campsie, Roselands, Carramar, Villawood and Punchbowl are one of the poorest areas in south-western Sydney. Furthmore, Claymore was listed as one of the most socially disadvantaged areas in New South Wales.

In the 1870s, the areas that were to become Villawood, Yennora and Carramar became significant vineyard locations due to the relatively rich alluvial soil from nearby creeks. Construction of a new city, Bradfield, began in 2024 and is projected to be finished by 2074. It is intended to be the first new city in Australia in a century. In July 2017, the global retailer Amazon purchased a 2.11ha site in Smeaton Grange for $7 million which is used as a data centre for Amazon Web Services. In 2009, land in the south of Cecil Hills was subdivided for Elizabeth Hills. Sometime between 2011 and 2016, the boundary of Cecil Hills expanded westward, incorporating parkland previously part of Cecil Park. Bradbury was one of the earliest suburbs to have underground powerlines, provide sewerage and design streets to slow car speeds. The City of Canterbury-Bankstown is home to the second highest number of registered businesses in NSW. In 2021–22, the City of Canterbury-Bankstown had an estimated Gross Regional Product (GRP) of $16.7 billion, making it the eight largest economy in the state.

=== Waste management ===
Residual waste generated across south-western Sydney is disposed of primarily at four landfill facilities: the Lucas Heights Resource Recovery Park, the Woodlawn Eco Precinct in the Goulburn Mulwaree local government area, Elizabeth Drive Landfill in Kemps Creek, and the Eastern Creek landfill in Eastern Creek. The Elizabeth Drive and Eastern Creek landfill sites primarily accept non-putrescible construction and demolition waste, while the Lucas Heights Resource Recovery Park is Sydney's only remaining putrescible landfill.

The Spring Farm Resource Recovery Park at Spring Farm processes household waste from the Campbelltown City Council, Camden Council, Wollondilly Shire Council and Wingecarribee Shire Council areas. The site includes a materials recycling facility (MRF) for sorting kerbside recyclables and recovering reusable materials. General waste and garden organics are temporarily stored before being transferred to landfill and commercial composting facilities, respectively.

== Transport ==
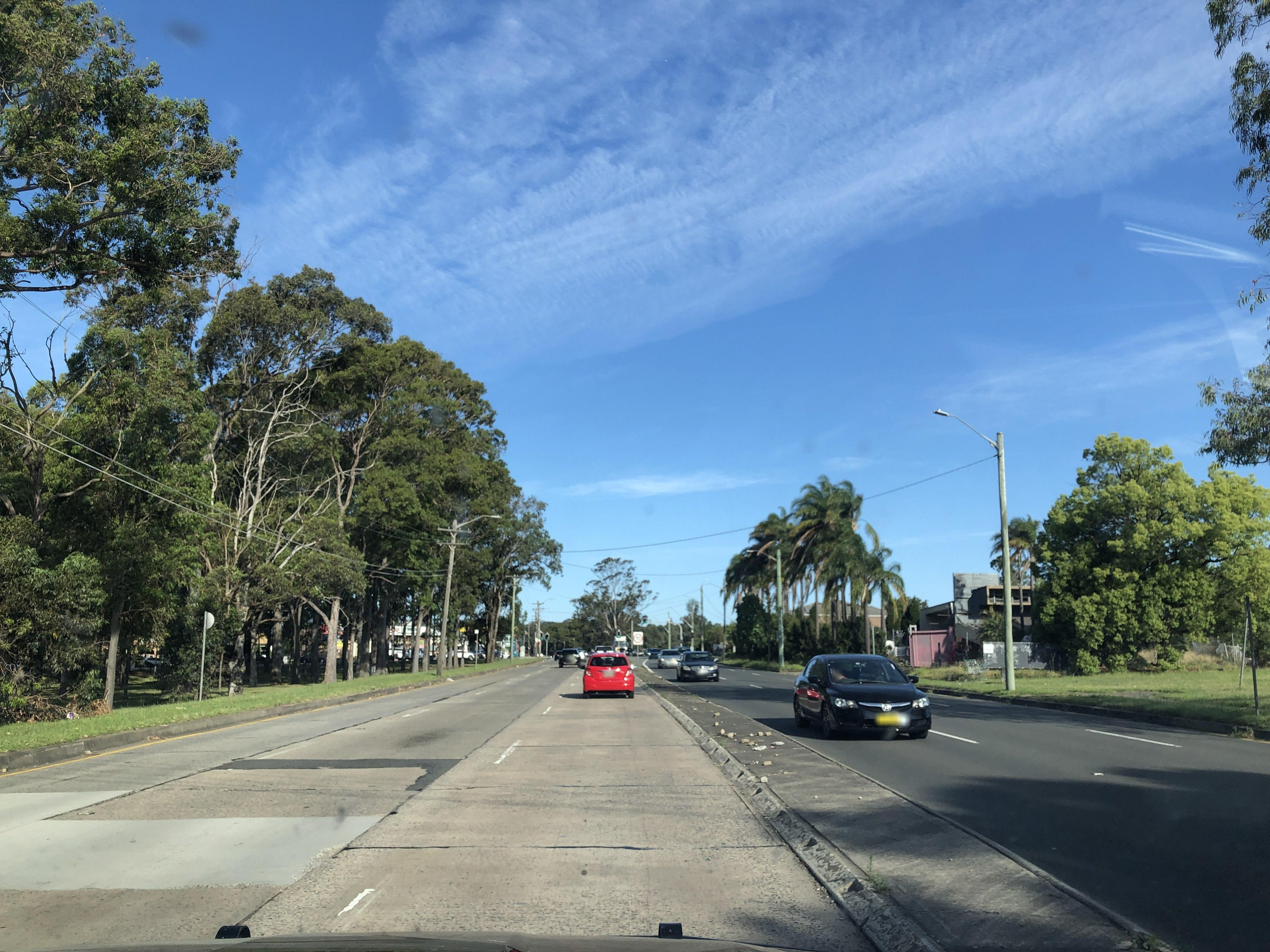
Hume Highway, Bass Hill, one of the major roads crossing the region

Railway lines in the area include the Main Southern railway line, Bankstown railway line, Main Suburban railway line, East Hills railway line and Old Main South railway line, connecting the region to central Sydney. Henry Lawson Drive was conceived of as a scenic drive to follow the north bank of the Georges River. Between 1912 and 1957, electric trams operated along Homer Street to Earlwood, providing service to the city via Marrickville and Newtown.

Cumberland Highway links the Pacific Highway (A1/B83) and Pacific Motorway (M1) at Pearces Corner, Wahroonga in the northeast with the Hume Highway (A22/A28) at Liverpool in the southwest. The M5 Motorway is the primary route from Liverpool to the Sydney CBD, with its terminus being in the south of an interchange near Prestons where the M5 meets the Westlink M7 and the M31 Hume Motorway. The A6 is a major arterial road that provides a link from the northern and western suburbs to the centre western suburbs – Bankstown and the Princes Highway at Heathcote, via Lidcombe and Bankstown.

Lansdowne Bridge is a heritage-listed road bridge that carries the northbound carriageway of the Hume Highway across Prospect Creek between Lansvale and Lansdowne. The Meccano Set is a well-known landmark in Lansdowne, consisting of an overhead tubular steel framework holding traffic lights and road signage, straddling the intersection of the Hume Highway, Henry Lawson Drive and Woodville Road. There are three telecommunications towers situated near the Cecil Park reservoir, one of which is an Airservices Australia radar.

== Politics ==
The region is known to be socially conservative due to its Christian and Muslim communities. The Macarthur Regional Organisation of Councils (MACROC) includes the local government areas of Camden, Campbelltown and Wollondilly. South Western Sydney includes, or partially includes, the NSW Electoral Districts of Badgerys Creek, Camden, Macquarie Fields, Leppington, Campbelltown, Liverpool, Cabramatta, Fairfield, Bankstown and Holsworthy.

Villawood Immigration Detention Centre, located in Villawood, houses asylum seekers who have been refused entry into the country at international airports and seaports, and they may also be detained in the centre. The centre has been the focus of much controversy, with accusations of human rights abuses. The site of the current KFC outlet at Earlwood was at one time the home of former prime minister John Howard.

== Culture ==
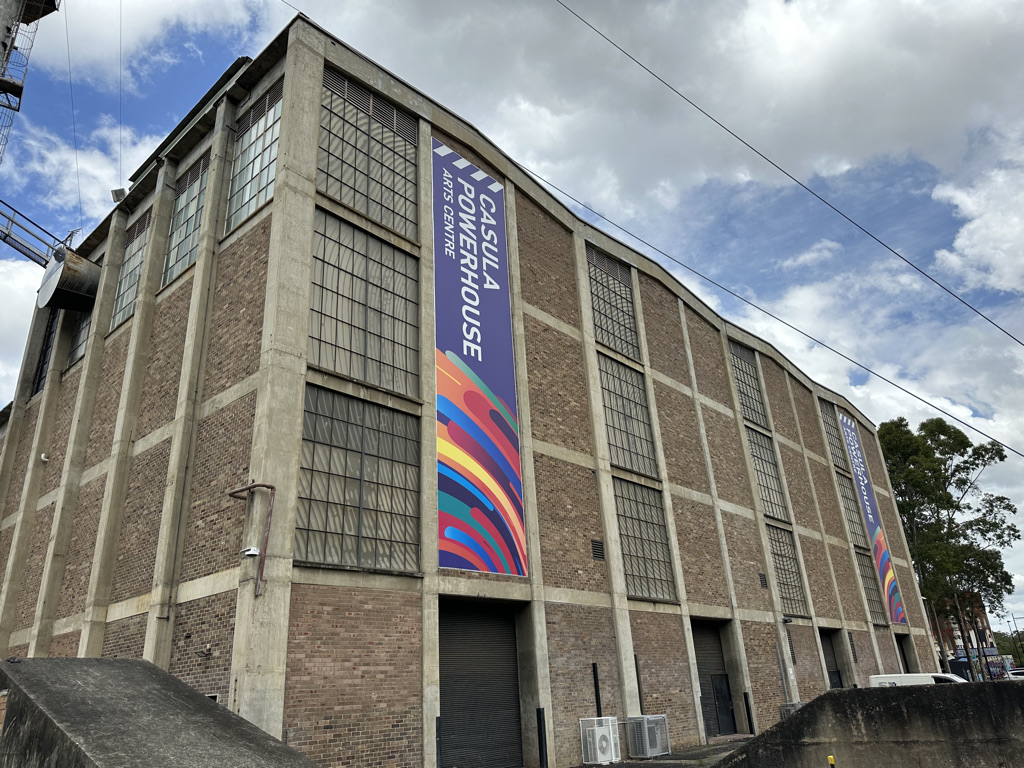
Casula Powerhouse

Opened in 2005, the Campbelltown Arts Centre is a cultural facility of Campbelltown City Council that is partially funded by the New South Wales Government through Create NSW. The Australian Army's Royal Australian Engineers were granted Freedom of Entry in 1959 and re-affirmed in 2018 as part of Liverpool's Centenary of Armistice commemoration. The Australian Air League's Moorebank Squadron were granted Freedom of Entry in 2022 marking 60 years in the Liverpool community and included a formation flypast over Bigge Park. Casula Powerhouse is a multi-disciplinary arts centre in Casula. The Fisher's ghost festival is held each November in Campbelltown.

Hoxton Park has many churches including Inspire Church, which has been active for more than 25 years with more than 5,000 members. Because of Cabramatta's high Vietnamese population, the suburb has earned the nickname 'Little Saigon'. Since the 2010s, the Mandaean community in the Greater Sydney region has been using the Georges River for their ritual baptisms, called masbuta. Along with the Nepean River, it is one of the few ritual rivers (called yardna in Mandaic) that they use for their baptism and ablution rituals.

=== Media ===
Glenfield gained notoriety in 1968 as the site of a hostage siege which ended in bizarre circumstances with the NSW Commissioner of Police Norm Allen acting as witness to the wedding of gunman Wally Mellish and hostage Beryl Muddle. The incident was made into the movie Mr Reliable starring Colin Friels and Jacqueline McKenzie. Serial killer Ivan Milat lived in Eagle Vale for a few years. Little Fish (2005) was filmed in the Cabramatta area and features Hollywood actors Cate Blanchett, Sam Neill and Hugo Weaving. In 2008, Sefton was a filming location for the international, award-winning and critically acclaimed television drama series East West 101.

In September 2012, an episode of the ABC program Four Corners entitled "Growing up poor" examined the lives of children in poor families in Claymore. It stated that the suburb had the youngest population in Australia. A report "Down and under" in the Al Jazeera 101 East series in February 2013 also pointed to the links between poverty and hopelessness, family tensions and violence and lack of opportunities for Claymore's children, where more than half the families have only one parent.

Radio stations serving the area include 2GLF (Liverpool, Fairfield), 2BACR (Bankstown), 2MCR (Macarthur) and C91.3 (Campbelltown).

=== Sport ===
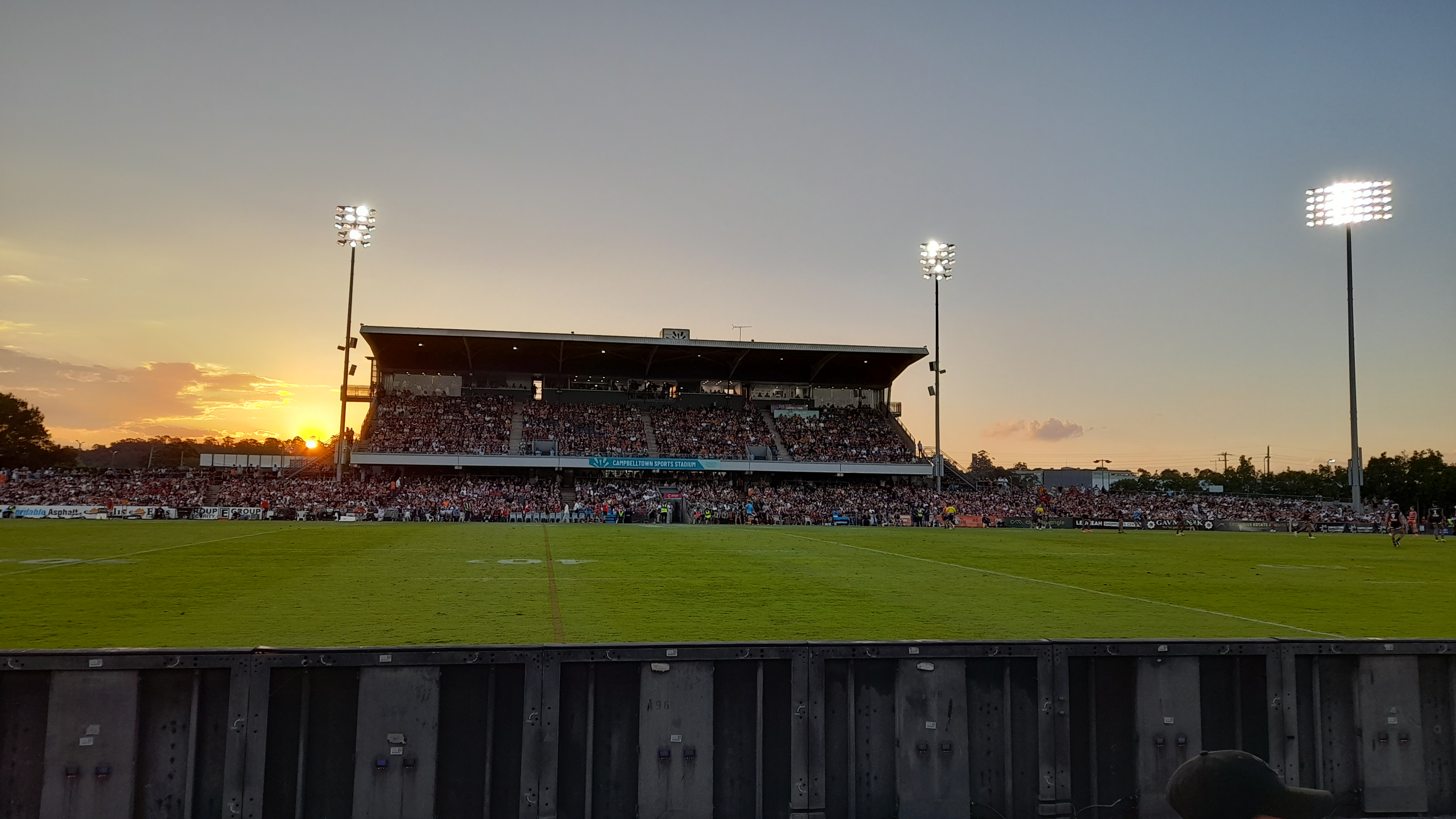
Campbelltown Stadium during the Wests Tigers vs St George Illawarra Dragons match

Sport teams based in the region include the Bankstown District Cricket Club, Macarthur Division Rugby League, Canterbury-Bankstown Bulldogs, Bankstown City Lions FC, Canterbury Bankstown FC, Bankstown Bruins, Western Sydney Wanderers and Macarthur FC. Campbelltown Stadium is a multi-purpose stadium in Leumeah.Minto has a rugby league team, the Minto Cobras playing in the Western Suburbs District Junior Rugby League. They have produced a number of NRL players including Israel Folau, Justin Brooker, John Skandalis, Ken McGuinness, Kevin McGuinness, Jarryd Hayne and Krisnan Inu. The Mounties Club in Mount Pritchard supports a number of local teams in various sports, including the Mounties rugby league team in the NSW Cup and the Mounties Wanderers in the National Premier Leagues NSW 2. Mount Pritchard also has an oval, Mount Pritchard Oval, for the rugby league and football team.

The Sydney International Shooting Centre was built in Cecil Park for the shooting events at the 2000 Summer Olympics, where it remains open to licensed shooters for recreational use. Warwick Farm Raceway was a motor racing facility which was in operation from 1960 to 1973. Located within the Warwick Farm Racecourse site, it hosted numerous major events including the Australian Grand Prix. Built in 1914, Menangle Park Paceway gave the suburb its name and is still its major landmark. In 1996, much of the Paceway activity was relocated to the newly upgraded Harold Park. Moorebank is home to a purpose-built remote control car race track.

== Education ==
The Campbelltown Rotary Observatory is located at the University of Western Sydney (Campbelltown Campus) and Macarthur Astronomical Society holds public lectures at the Macarthur Astronomy Forum and public observing nights at selected locations. Major education facilities include:

- Western Sydney University, a multi-campus university that is ranked in the top 300 in the world in the 2021 THE World University Rankings and 18th in Australia in 2021.
- TAFE NSW campuses across Western Sydney (including OTEN) and South Western Sydney
- University of Sydney – Camden and Westmead Campus

A Muslim group, the Quranic Society, made a development application in the Camden area for an A$19 million Muslim school with the capacity for 1,200 students. In May 2008 the Council voted unanimously to reject the application. After reducing its proposal to a school catering for 900 students, the Quranic Society took its case to the Land and Environment Court. The application was met with significant community protest; and the application rejected by the Court on the grounds that the land chosen was suited to rural uses.

== Landmarks ==
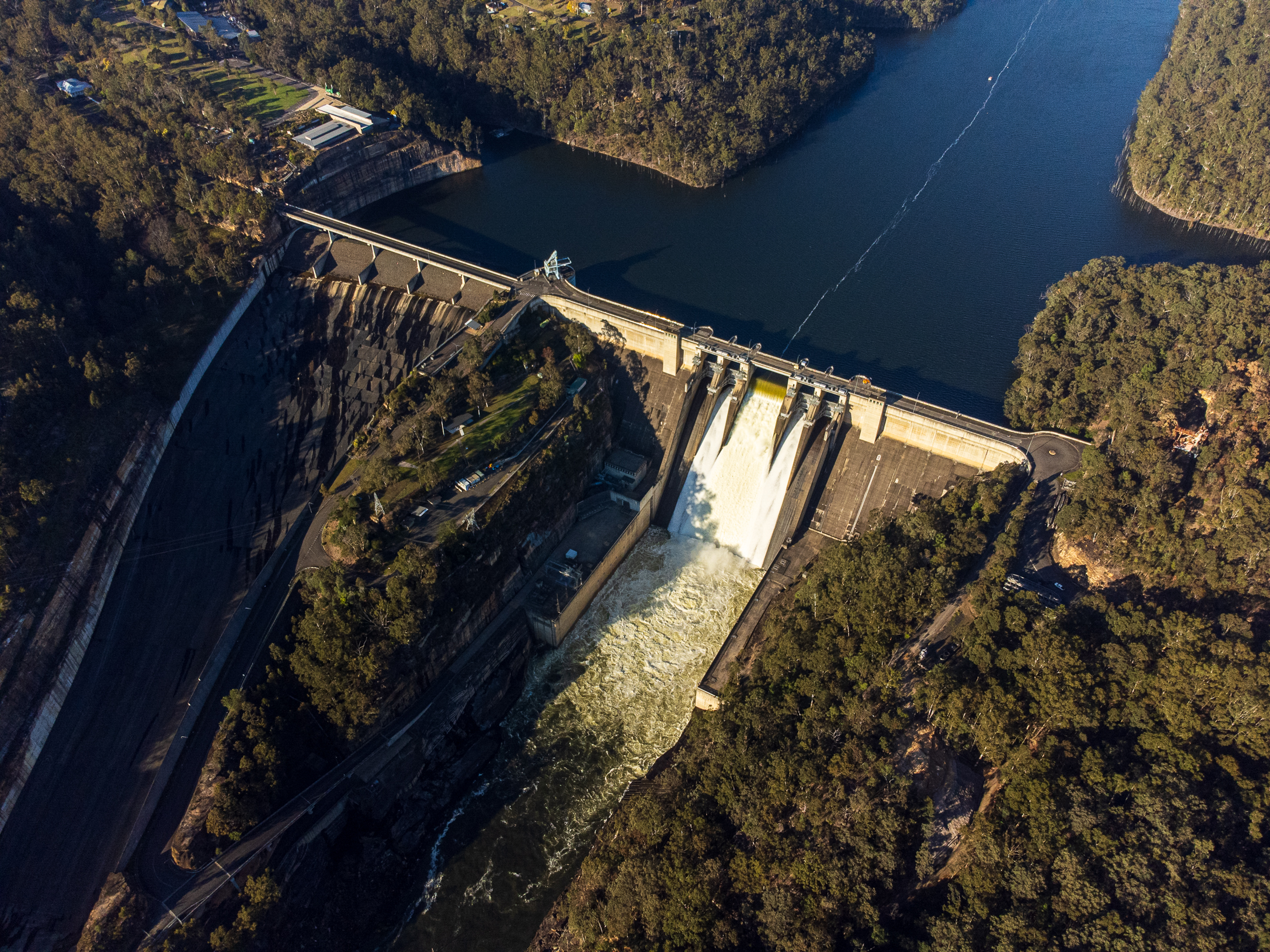
Aerial view of Warragamba Dam during spill

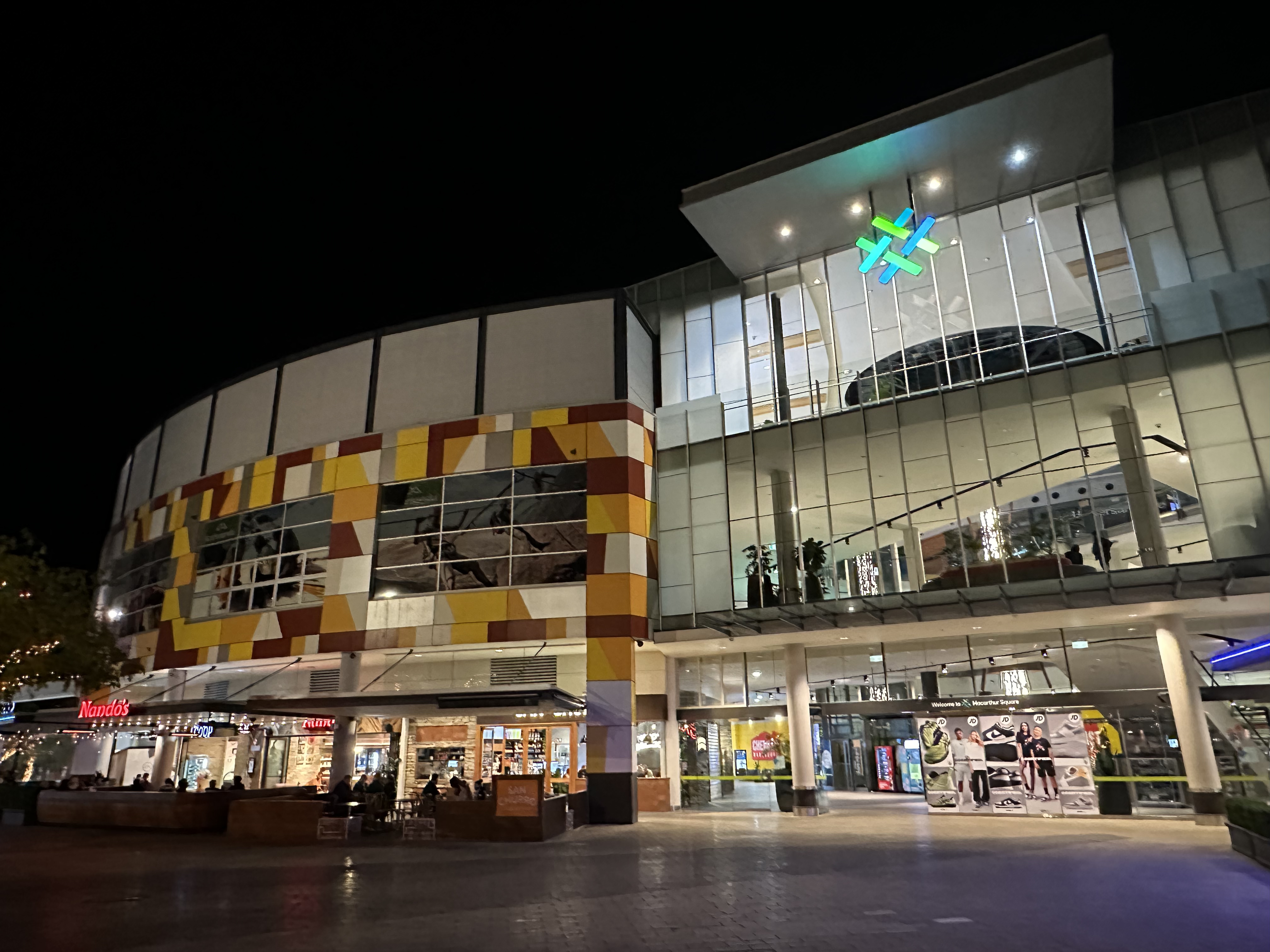
Macarthur Square, Campbelltown, one of the largest shopping complexes in Sydney

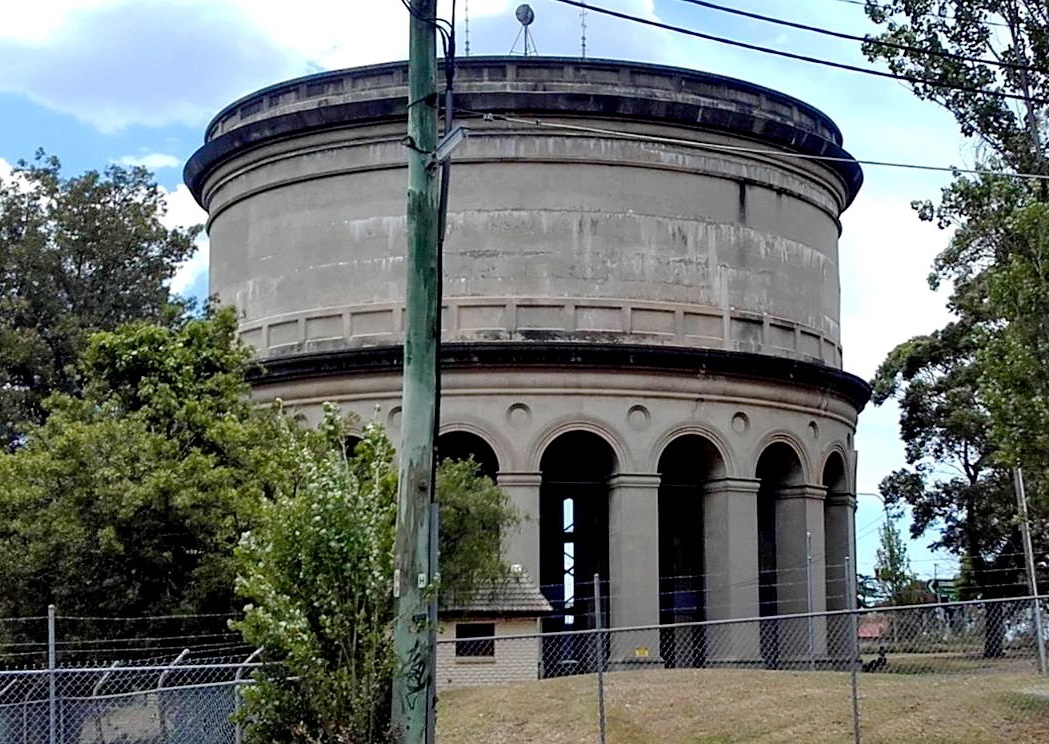
Bankstown Reservoir

- Bankstown Reservoir, a heritage-protected water tower in Bankstown
- Condell Park, Corner of Marion and Edgar Street: Bankstown Bunker
- Cecil Hills Farm, a heritage-listed residence in Cecil Hills.
- Mirambeena Regional Park, an urban park system and a nature reserve within the suburbs of Georges Hall and Lansdowne
- Chipping Norton Lake, an important recreational area for Liverpool City council and Fairfield City Council.
- Georges River National Park, a protected national park, under the management of the NSW National Parks and Wildlife Service.
- Macarthur Square, a shopping complex in Campbelltown.
- The Bland Oak in Carramar, one of the oldest and largest trees in Sydney.
- Lansdowne Bridge, a heritage-listed road bridge that carries the Hume Highway across the Prospect Creek at Lansvale.
- Oran Park (homestead), a heritage-listed former golf course, private residence and golf clubhouse and now private residence in Oran Park.
- Raby, Catherine Field, a heritage-listed former sheep farm and cattle farm and now private residence located in Catherine Field.
- Horningsea Park, a heritage-listed homestead in Horningsea Park
- Campbelltown, Broughton Street: St John's Catholic Church, Campbelltown
- Appin, Cataract Road: Cataract Dam
- Appin, Wilton Road: Windmill Hill, Appin
- Bargo, Avon Dam Road: Nepean Dam
- Bargo, Hume Highway: Wirrimbirra Sanctuary
- Bargo, Main Southern railway 96.265 km: Bargo railway viaduct
- Camden Park, Elizabeth Macarthur Avenue: Camden Park Estate
- Cordeaux, Cordeaux River: Cordeaux Dam
- Menangle, Main Southern railway: Nepean River railway bridge, Menangle
- Orangeville, Brownlow Hill Loop Road: Brownlow Hill Estate
- Picton, Hume Highway Deviation: Jarvisfield
- Picton, Main Southern railway: Stonequarry Creek railway viaduct, Picton
- Picton, Oaks Road: Abbotsford
- Picton, Prince Street: Victoria Bridge, Picton
- Thirlmere, NSW Rail Transport Museum, Barbour Road: Rail Paybus FP1
- Warragamba, Coxs River Arms: Coxs River track
- Warragamba, Warragamba Dam: Megarritys Bridge
- Warragamba, Warragamba Dam: Warragamba Dam – Haviland Park
- Warragamba, Warragamba Dam: Warragamba Dam Emergency Scheme
- Wilton, Wilton Park Road: Wilton Park
- Campbelltown, 8 Lithgow Street: Glenalvon House
- Campbelltown, 14–20 Queen Street: Warbys Barn and Stables
- Campbelltown, 261 Queen Street: Campbelltown Post Office
- Campbelltown, 263 Queen Street: Commercial Banking Company of Sydney, Campbelltown Branch (former)
- Campbelltown, 284–298 Queen Street: Queen Street Buildings
- Campbelltown, 303 Queen Street: Dredges Cottage
- Denham Court, 238 Campbelltown Road: Denham Court (homestead)
- Gilead, 767 Appin Road: Beulah, Gilead
- Gilead, Menangle Road: Sugarloaf Farm
- Ingleburn, 196 Campbelltown Road: Robin Hood Farm
- Kearns, Mississippi Crescent: Epping Forest, Kearns
- Kentlyn, Darling Avenue: Bull Cave
- Leumeah, Holly Lea Road: Holly Lea and Plough Inn
- Macquarie Fields, Quarter Sessions Road: Macquarie Field House
- Menangle Park, Glenlee Road: Glenlee, Menangle Park
- Minto, Lot 315 Ben Lomond Road: Stone Cottage, Minto
- St Helens Park, Appin Road: Denfield
- St Helens Park, St Helens Park Drive: St Helen's Park
- Varroville, 196 St Andrews Road: Varroville (homestead)
- Camden, 135 Argyle Street: Camden Post Office
- Camden, Aerodrome Road, Cobbitty: Macquarie Grove
- Camden, Exeter Street: Nant Gwylan and Garden
- Camden South, Elizabeth Macarthur Avenue: Camden Park Estate and Belgenny Farm
- Catherine Field, 1025 Camden Valley Way: Raby, Catherine Field
- Cobbitty, 421 The Northern Road: Denbigh, Cobbitty
- Gledswood Hills, 900 Camden Valley Way: Gledswood
- Harrington Park, 1 Hickson Circuit: Harrington Park (homestead)
- Harrington Park, 181–183 Northern Road: Orielton
- Narellan, Camden Valley Way: Studley Park, Narellan
- Narellan, Kirkham Lane: Camelot, Kirkham
- Narellan, Kirkham Lane: Kirkham Stables
- Oran Park, 112–130 Oran Park Drive: Oran Park (homestead)
- Ashbury, Holden Street: Ashfield Reservoir
- Canterbury, 9 Fore Street: Bethungra, Canterbury
- Canterbury, Sugar House Road: Old Sugarmill
- Earlwood, Pine Street: Cooks River Sewage Aqueduct
- Earlwood, Unwin Street: Wolli Creek Aqueduct

== See also ==
- Geography of Sydney
- Macarthur, New South Wales
- Regions of Sydney
- Southern Sydney
- St George, Sydney
- Western Sydney
