= Macarthur Heights =

Macarthur Heights is a residential estate of Sydney, in the local government area of the City of Campbelltown, New South Wales, Australia, around 45 kilometres (28 mi) south-west of the Sydney central business district. The suburb was established in 2013.

== History ==
Macarthur Heights is constructed on open land formerly owned by Western Sydney University. Construction of Stage 1 of the new suburb began in 2013. The street names reflect an astronomical theme, including Milky Way and Orion Street.

== Location and description ==
Macarthur Heights is located in the local government area of the City of Campbelltown, New South Wales, Australia, 45 kilometres (28 mi) (direct line) south-west of the Sydney central business district.

It is part of the Macarthur region and is located between the M31 Motorway and Western Sydney University. The fledgling suburb consists mainly of new housing, two small feature parks and an astronomical observatory.

The principal access road is Goldsmith Avenue.

== Gates of Light ==
A prominent feature of the new suburb is the Gates of Light sculpture, located in Main Ridge Park opposite the observatory, which recognises the contribution which the Campbelltown Rotary Observatory made to the area. The sculpture by Khaled Sabsabi, who won the Blake Prize for Religious Art in 2011, consists of three pointed arches, or gates, and was installed in October 2014. It is illuminated at night and features the various astronomical constellations, providing a basic sky map. Sabsabi and UrbanGrowth NSW consulted University of Western Sydney staff as well as members of the Macarthur Astronomical Society on the design.

Adjacent to the sculptures, large concrete spheres have been placed, to represent the planets.

== Observatory ==
The Campbelltown Rotary Observatory, formerly stood on a hilltop close to where the "Gates of Light" are now situated. The hilltop was bulldozed and the Observatory was relocated to make way for the new development. It now stands closer to the university on the highest point in the suburb.

== Transport ==
The nearest railway station is Macarthur and various bus routes are accessible on Narellan Road and at Macarthur.
