= Macarthur, New South Wales =

Region of Sydney, Australia

Macarthur
- Region
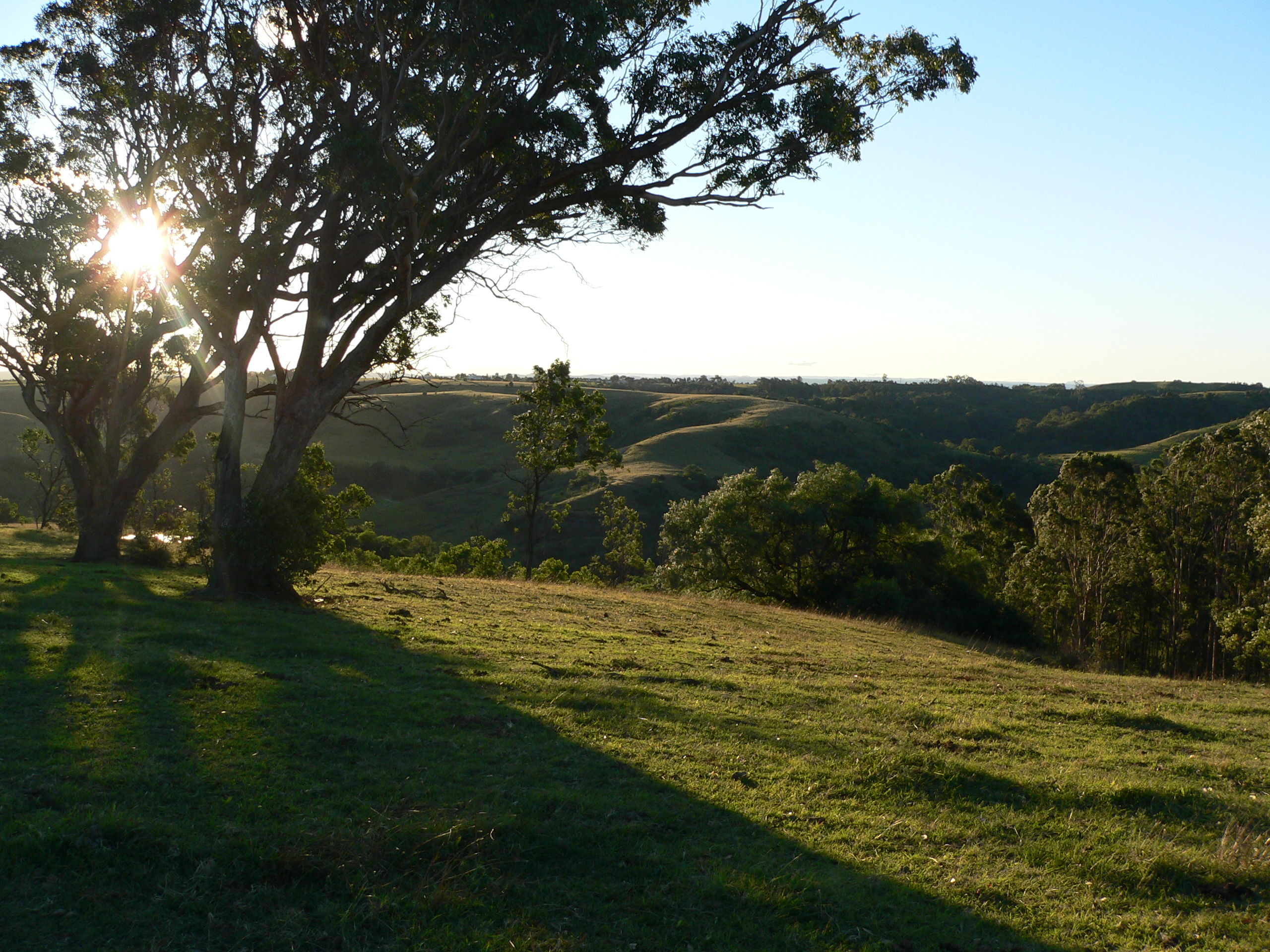
- Hills of the Razorback Range located in between Camden and Picton.

- Country: Australia
- State: New South Wales
- Region: Greater Western Sydney
- City: Sydney
- LGAs: Campbelltown; Camden; Wollondilly

Government
  - State electorate: Campbelltown, Macquarie Fields, Camden
  - Federal division: Macarthur, Werriwa, Hume

Population
  - Total: 309,792 (2016)
Regions around Macarthur
Greater Western Sydney	South Western Sydney	Southern Sydney
Blue Mountains	Macarthur	Southern Sydney
Southern Highlands	Southern Highlands	Illawarra

Macarthur is a region in the Outer South-West part of the Greater Sydney area, in the state of New South Wales, Australia. The region includes the local government areas of the City of Campbelltown, the Camden Council and the Wollondilly Shire. It covers an area of 3,067 square kilometres and has a population of close to 310,000 residents.

The region is bounded at the north by Glenfield; at the south by Yanderra; at the east by the town of Appin; and at the west by the hamlet Nattai.

Most of the population lives within the satellite city of Campbelltown and its surrounding suburbs.

The region is one of the fastest-growing regions in the Sydney metropolitan area, with many new modern suburbs sprouting up in recent decades such as Glen Alpine, Macquarie Links, Harrington Park, Blair Athol, Mount Annan, Currans Hill, Englorie Park, Picton, Oran Park, Gregory Hills, Gledswood Hills, Spring Farm and Catherine Field.

== Etymology ==
The region is named after John Macarthur and Elizabeth Macarthur who were founders and pioneers of the Australian wool industry. Founded on land owned by the Macarthurs and surveyed by Sir Thomas Mitchell, the town of Camden was named for Lord Camden, who, during his brief tenure as Secretary of State for War and the Colonies had secured the initial land grant for John Macarthur who was then in England. The original Macarthur family property covered the three local councils (Camden Council, Campbelltown City Council and Wollondilly Shire) that are within the region.

== Geography ==
The region is generally regarded as the area where the city of Sydney meets rural countryside of regional New South Wales, and is considered to be part of the south west part of the Greater Sydney area. Campbelltown and Camden were once rural towns which formed the nucleus of new urban communities created following the Three Cities Structure Plan 1973.

The Wollondilly Shire which makes up the largest Southern part of the region is a mostly rural region with small scale industry and commerce. Notably, the Wollondilly supplies much of Sydney Metropolitan and surrounding areas with water from Warragamba Dam, Cataract Dam in Appin, Cordeaux Dam in Wilton and Avon and Nepean Dams even though located in the Wingecarribee Shire is accessed via road through Wollondilly's Bargo.

The region has thus far recorded two earthquakes in history – one occurring in Appin on 17 March 1999, and one in Picton on 9 March 1973. The Picton one had a damage total of $2.8 million, with some minor damage in Bowral and Wollongong. The earthquakes had a magnitude scale of 4.8 and 5.6, respectively.

== Councils of the Macarthur Region ==
- The Campbelltown City Council administrative offices are located in Campbelltown.
- The Wollondilly Shire Council administrative offices are located in Picton.
- The Camden Council administrative offices are located in Oran Park.

Camden Council announced in May 2012 that it would transfer its administrative offices from the Camden township to Oran Park.

== History ==
The Macarthur Region sits within the lands of the Dharawal Nation being the original owners and carers of the land.

The history of the Macarthur Region begins over 40,000 years ago and is contained in the continuing culture of the Dharawal Nation. The land still contains physical reminders of the past lives of the Dharawal people in rock engravings, cave paintings, axe grinding grooves and shell middens. Their culture continues and is celebrated through their surviving songs, stories and descendants. The lands of the Dharawal Nation extended from approximately Botany Bay to Shoalhaven and to the foothills of the mountain ranges to the west.

The principal symbol of the Dharawal Nation is the lyrebird (Wiridjiribin).

European history began in 1788 shortly after settlement at Sydney Cove, when the colony's entire herd of cattle (four cows and two bulls) strayed from their enclosure in Sydney Cove and were lost. In 1795 a greatly enlarged herd of 61 cattle were discovered by European settlers on grassy lands between the Nepean River and Georges River some 60 km southwest of Sydney Cove.

The grassy lands were promptly named the "Cowpastures" – and decalred a restricted area to ensure ongoing protection for the herd. This restriction was short-lived as the herd, deemed too aggressive to be tamed, was ultimately destroyed.

The early settlement of the area was described by Lachlan Macquarie in his journals, whose accounts include the description of Elizabeth Macarthur being met in a 'miserable' bark hut being the only accommodation that existing at Camden Park. In 1803, John Macarthur had been granted 5,000 acres (20 km^{2}) in the area known as the Cowpastures, on which he began grazing Merino sheep.

His sons William and James introduced viticulture and a commercial nursery, and a successful dairy was founded by James' wife, Mrs Emily Stone.

In 1816, a terrible event called the Appin Massacre occurred in the region, south of the township of Appin.

The region is steeped in history with both aboriginala nd European history with statesmen, adventurers, larrikins and villains all having an association with the Macarthur region which makes it a popular destination for tourists and history buffs.

Macarthur's history, heritage and culture are reflected in its heritage sites. The area also offers opportunities for tourism, including heritage and adventure tourism.

Camden, Campbelltown, and Wollondilly Local Government Areas make up the Macarthur region. This region is generally regarded as the area where the city of Sydney meets its rural countryside.

The Macarthur Region is considered to be the fastest growing region in NSW.

== Local attractions ==
Major attractions of Camden are:

- Australian Botanic Garden, Mount Annan

Mount Annan Botanic Gardens is a 416-acre (1.68 km^{2}) botanic garden opened in 1988. It is currently the largest botanic gardens in Australia and is administered by the Royal Botanic Gardens, Sydney. It is home to a large collection of native plants, and includes facilities such as picnic areas (with barbecues), walking trails and a restaurant.

- Camden Park Estate, Camden

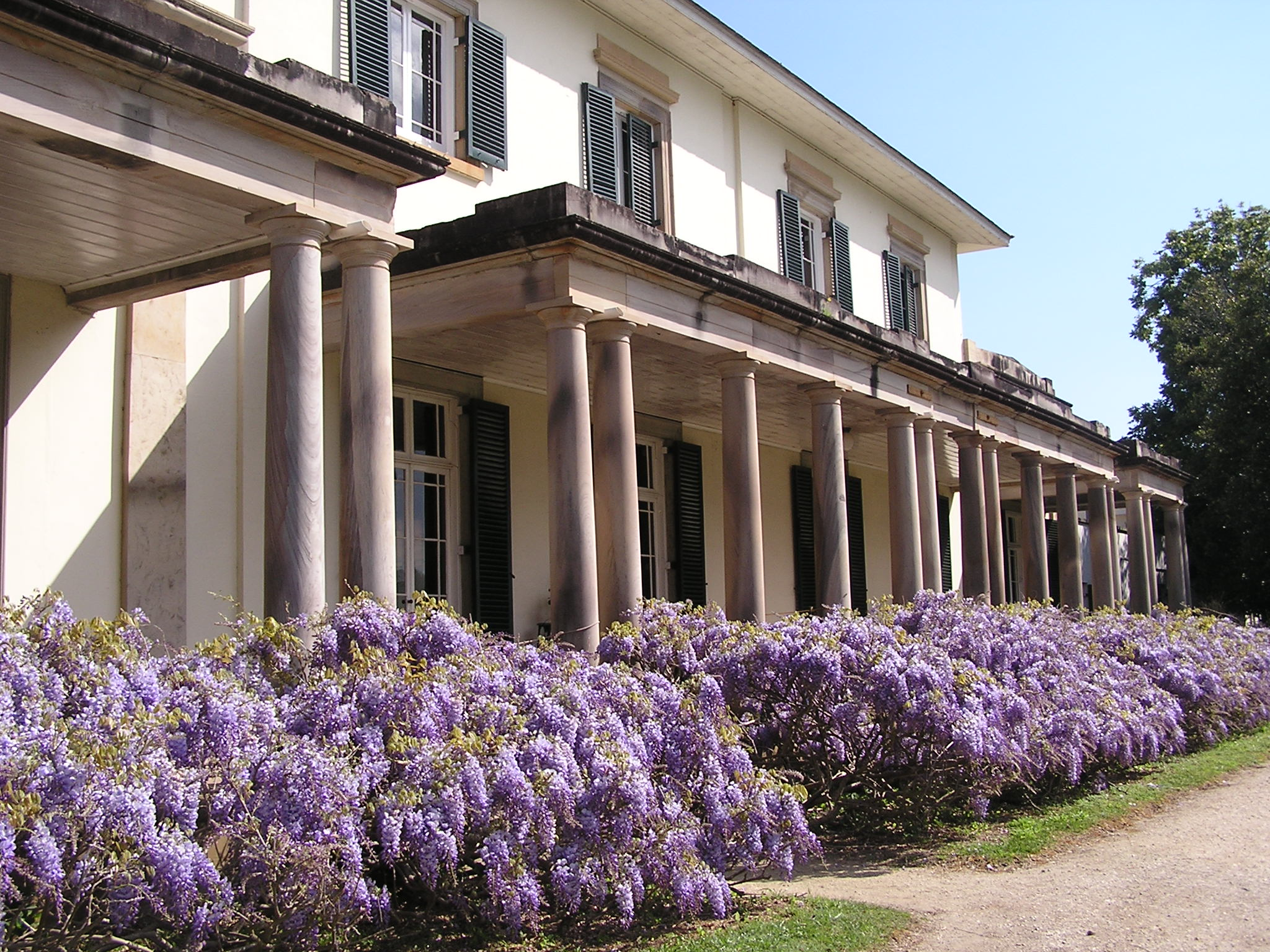
Camden Park House built by the Macarthurs.

Camden Park Estate was the country property of Australian Wool Pioneers John Macarthur and his wife Elizabeth Macarthur, and became the principal residence of their family after John's death. Centrepiece of the original 2023.5 hectares (5000 acres) granted to Macarthur by the Governor of New South Wales, at the request of Lord Camden, is Camden Park House, designed by John Verge in the neo-Palladian style favoured by the colony's wealthy pastoral 'exclusives', and built between 1832 and 1834; Macarthur himself did not live to see the house completed. Currently, the house remains on 388.5 hectares (960 acres) of the original estate. Macarthur's descendants still reside on the house and property.

Adjacent to Camden Park, though once within its extent, is Belgenny Farm, which is popularly called the "Birthplace of Australia's Agriculture". Designed by architect Henry Kitchen, Belgenny Cottage was built c1821 and was mentioned in Kitchen's submission to Commissioner John Thomas Bigge's enquiry into the state of the colony under Governor Lachlan Macquarie. This original 'cottage ornée', which was demolished in the early 1900s and replaced with the current weatherboard structure, was used by the family when visiting the property until the construction of Camden Park House on an adjacent hilltop. John Macarthur himself died in the cottage in 1834, and was buried in the family cemetery immediately to the south. Currently, the farm is home to descendants of sheep that were brought by the Macarthurs and has a functioning vineyard that produces wine as well as orchards. A 2010 archaeological survey and dig to the north of Belgenny may have determined the location of the original 'miserable hut'.

- Camden Valley Golf Resort, Catherine Field

Camden Valley Golf Resort, opened in 1964 by architect Prosper Ellis, is a popular 27 hole golf course. Facilities include a clubhouse and brasserie.

=== Campbelltown City ===
Major attractions of Campbelltown are:

- Macarthur Square, Campbelltown

Macarthur Square is the biggest shopping centre in the Macarthur region and caters for the entire region. It contains over 300 shops and includes the department stores Big W, Target and David Jones. Macarthur Square is located in the suburb of Campbelltown, New South Wales, which is about 1 km south of Campbelltown's CBD. It is located adjacent to Macarthur railway station and University of Western Sydney, Macarthur.

- Eschol Park House, Eschol Park

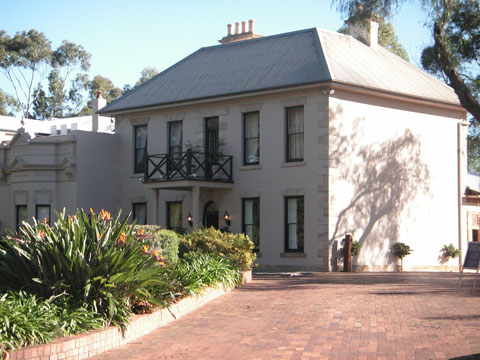
Eschol Park House

- Campbelltown City Arts Centre, Campbelltown

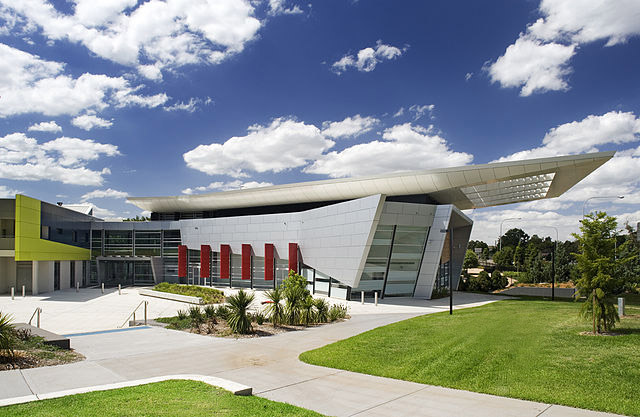
Campbelltown Arts Centre

Campbelltown City Arts Centre is one of the largest art galleries and exhibitions centres in the Macarthur Region. It is home to Campbelltown Bicentennial Art Gallery, which contains both permanent contemporary art collections and temporary exhibitions. The centre also does art workshops and performing arts.

The centre is well known for promoting multicultural-themed art and Indigenous Australian art.

The Japanese Tea Garden is also found within the arts centre. It was a gift from the Japanese city of Koshigaya, the sister city of Campbelltown.

- Campbelltown Sports Stadium, Leumeah

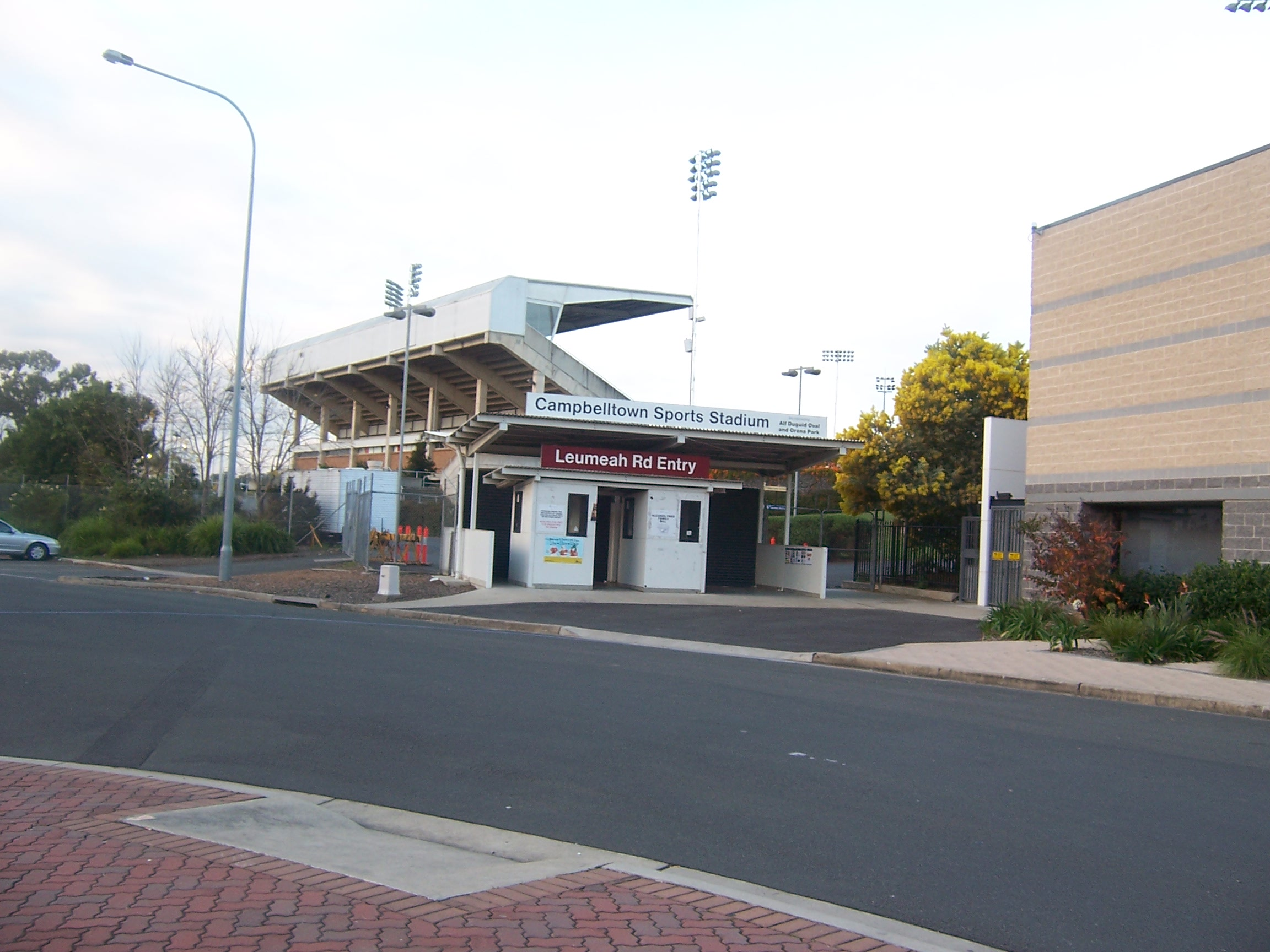
The Campbelltown Sports Stadium is located in Leumeah

The Campbelltown Sports Stadium caters for 21,000 and has grandstand seating for 9,000. It is one of the home stadiums for the Wests Tigers NRL Team. Moreover, the team's leagues club is located adjacent to the stadium as well as an athletics centre and large tennis court complex. Campbelltown Sports Stadium is also the home of the region's new A-League club Macarthur FC.

- Campbelltown Catholic Club, Campbelltown

Campbelltown Catholic Club is the largest club in the Macarthur Region. The club notably owns and has shares in The Cube (Campbelltown Convention Centre), Aquafit Gym and the Rydges Hotel located adjacent to the club.

== Organisations and media ==
- Macarthur Tourism – The official tourism organisation of the Macarthur Region. It looks after the tourism of three 3 councils of the Region; Wollondilly, Camden and Campbelltown.
- Macarthur Credit Union – The official local credit union bank that caters exclusively for the residents of the Wollondilly, Camden and Campbelltown.
- Macarthur Chronicle – A News Corp Australia owned organisation that manage the three local edition newspapers to the specific LGAs that make up the region: Macarthur Chronicle Wollondilly, Macarthur Chronicle Campbelltown and Macarthur Chronicle Camden. The organisation is based in Campbelltown.
- C91.3 – A commercial radio station broadcasting on 91.3 FM.
- Vintage FM – A commercial radio station broadcasting on 88.7 FM.
- 2MCR – A community radio station broadcasting on 100.3 FM.

=== Astronomy ===
The Campbelltown Rotary Observatory is located at the University of Western Sydney (Campbelltown Campus) and Macarthur Astronomical Society holds public lectures at the Macarthur Astronomy Forum and public observing nights at selected locations.

== Sources ==
- The State Planning Authority of NSW, 1973, The New Cities of Campbelltown, Camden and Appin: Structure Plan.
