= Macarthur Astronomy Forum =

- Formation: 21 February 2011
- Purpose: Promote excellence in astronomy in Macarthur region.
- Location: Western Sydney University, Campbelltown, SW Sydney, Australia
- Region served: Macarthur Region.
- Parent organization: Macarthur Astronomical Society.
- Website: www.macastro.org.au
- Remarks: Held third Monday of month (Jan-Nov). Previously known as General Meeting of Macarthur Astronomical Society.

Macarthur Astronomy Forum is a monthly public forum organised by Macarthur Astronomical Society, providing leading national and international professional astronomers with a platform to address the Forum on topics of astronomical interest; also providing members of the Society and the general public with opportunities to learn and ask questions.

The Forums (known as the General Meetings of the Society until the new identity was adopted in February 2011) have been held (admission free) at (and with the support of) the Western Sydney University (Cambelltown Campus), NSW, Australia since the second meeting of the Society in 1996.

The first Macarthur Astronomy Forum was held on 21 February 2011, with a presentation by Professor Fred Watson A.M., Astronomer-In-Charge of the Australian Astronomical Observatory, Siding Springs, NSW, Australia. The talk was entitled: "Poles Apart - The environment near a planet's poles".

The Forums are open to the general public and are held monthly.

== Aims ==
- To bring excellence in astronomy to the Western Sydney University and to the Macarthur Region.
- To provide a prestigious public platform for expert national and international astronomers from Australia and elsewhere to make an illustrated presentation on their individual fields of expertise.
- To foster the science of astronomy within the community.
- To bridge the divide between professional astronomy and amateur astronomy.

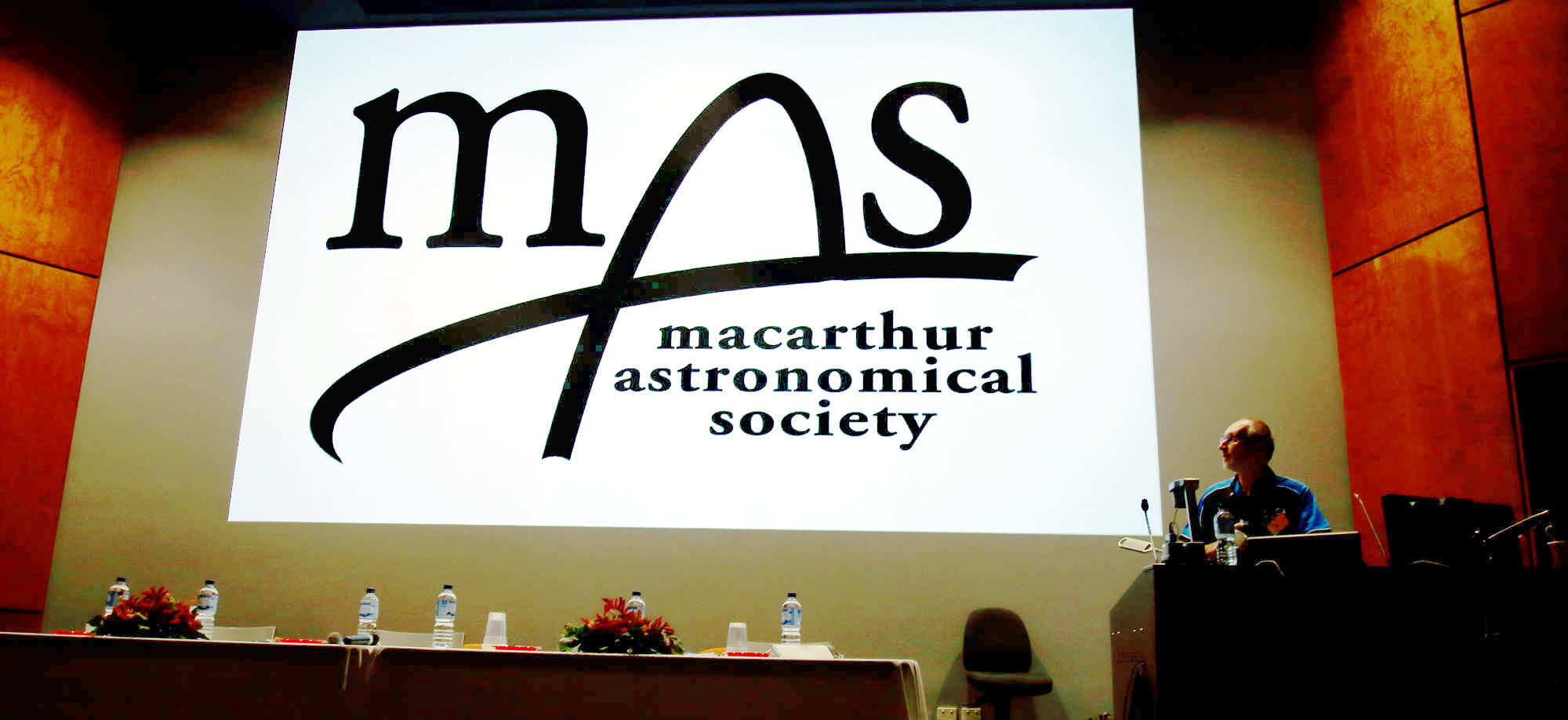
A Macarthur Astronomy Forum being introduced by Macarthur Astronomical Society President, Tony Law.

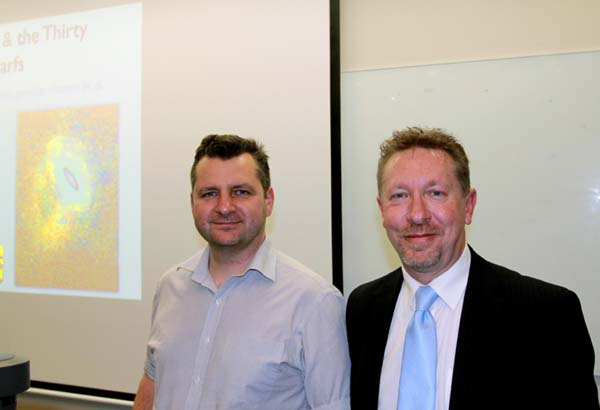
Professor Geraint Lewis (Sydney University) is welcomed to the September 2012 Macarthur Astronomy Forum by Chris Malikoff (President, Macarthur Astronomical Society).

== List of International guest speakers ==
International speakers who have addressed the Society:

- Dr Gregory Chamitoff, a NASA astronaut, Canada, who flew on Space Shuttle Discovery and Endeavour missions STS-124 and STS-134 to the International Space Station.
- Professor John Peacock, cosmologist and astronomer, (University of Edinburgh).
- Dr. Mark Phillips, Associate Director of the Las Campanas Observatory in Chile.
- Dr Giovanni Carraro, astronomer, Paranal Observatory, (European Southern Observatory), Chile.
- Geoffrey Notkin, a meteorite hunter based in Tucson, Arizona, United States and co-star of the American TV series The Meteorite Men.
- Amy Shira Teitel, a space exploration historian and YouTuber, based in Canada.
- Tom Nolan, Earth and Climate Scientist, NASA Jet Propulsion Laboratory.
- Shannon McConnell, Deep Sky Network, Public Engagement Manager, NASA Jet Propulsion Laboratory.
- Todd Barber, Senior Propulsion Engineer, NASA Jet Propulsion Laboratory.
- Deb Brice, Marine Science Educator, NASA Jet Propulsion Laboratory.
- Rachel Zimmerman Brachman, Outreach Lead for Radioisotope Power Systems, NASA Jet Propulsion Laboratory.
- Christine Fuller, Robotics Mechanical Engineer, Extreme Terrain Robotics, NASA Jet Propulsion Laboratory.
- Dr. Michael Malaska, Astrobiologist, NASA Jet Propulsion Laboratory.

== List of Local guest speakers ==
Professional astronomers who have recently addressed the Society include:

- The 2011 Nobel Laureate for Physics Professor Brian Schmidt (Australian National University, Mount Stromlo Observatory).
- Professor Bryan Gaensler (Sydney University, Young Australian of the Year 1999 and Director of CAASTRO), University of Toronto since Jan 2015.
- Professor Geraint Lewis (Sydney University)
- Professor Fred Watson AM (Astronomer-In-Charge of the Australian Astronomical Observatory and Australia's first Astronomer at Large).
- Professor Naomi McClure-Griffiths (Australian National University)
- Professor Tamara Davis (University of Queensland).
- Professor Gary DaCosta (Australian National University).
- Prof. Michael Wheatland (University of Sydney).
- Associate Professor Peter Tuthill (Sydney University), known for his work on the Red Square Nebula.
- Dr. Ragbir Bhathal (University of Western Sydney)
- Dr. David Malin (Australian Astronomical Observatory).
- Prof. Lisa Harvey-Smith (Project Scientist for the Square Kilometre Array 2009-2012 & Project Scientist for ASKAP 2012-to 2018 and first Australian Ambassador for Women in STEM).
- Prof. Tim Bedding (University of Sydney).
- Prof Matthew Bailes (Swinburn University).
- Prof. Joss Bland-Hawthorne (University of Sydney).
- Assoc. Prof. Charley Lineweaver (Australian National University).
- Prof. Tara Murphy (University of Sydney).
- Prof. Joss Bland-Hawthorn (University of Sydney).
- Dr. Mike Ireland (Macquarie University).
- Dr. Max Spolaor (Australian Astronomical Observatory).
- Dr. Andrew Hopkins (Australian Astronomical Observatory).
- Dr. Tim Robishaw.
- Dr. Greg Madsen (Sydney University).
- Dr. Simon O'Toole (Anglo-Australian Telescope).
- Dr. Lucyna Kedziora-Chudczer (School of Physics and Astrophysics, UNSW).
- Dr. Emil Lenc (University of Sydney and CAASTRO).
- Dr. Graeme Salter, University of NSW.
- Dr. Jonti Horner, University of NSW.
- Dr. Jeremy Bailey, University of NSW.
- Dr. Geoff Sims, University of NSW.
- Dr. Ángel R. López-Sánchez (Australian Astronomical Observatory).
- Dr Amanda Bauer (Australian Astronomical Observatory).
- Shaila Akhter (University of NSW).
- Dr. Roberto Soria (ICRAR & Curtin University).
- Dr. Luke Barnes (University of Sydney).
- Dr. Jonty Marshall (University of NSW).
- Dr. James Allen (University of Sydney).
- Dr. Ed Kruzins (CSIRO, Director of NASA Deep Space Communication Complex, Tidbinbilla).
- Dr. Lee Spitler (Macquarie University).
- Dr. Andrew Green (AVSO).
- Dr. Stuart Ryder (Anglo-Australian Telescope).
- Dr. Vanessa Moss (University of Sydney).
- Dr. Maria Cunningham (University of NSW).
- Marnie Ogg (Dark skies advocate).
- Dr. Brad Tucker (Australian National University).
- Dr. Devika Kamath (Maq. Uni).
- Dr. Tayyaba Zafar (Australian Astronomical Observatory).
- Dr. Brett Addison (USQ).
- Dr Ashley Ruiter (UNSW Canberra).
- Dr. Ciaran O’Hare (University of Sydney).
- Sarah Caddy (Macquarie University).
- Dr Doris Grosse (Australian National University).
- Dr Simon Ellis (Macquarie University).
- Dr Kirsten Banks (University of NSW).

These astronomers are users of the world's most sophisticated optical, radio, gamma-ray orbital and ground-based telescopes, including the Hubble, Keck, Parkes and the ATNF telescopes. In Lisa Harvey-Smith's case, she was also the project scientist responsible for Australia's participation in the design of the world's largest-ever radio telescope, the SKA, and the commissioning of its precursor, ASKAP.

The Forum is also addressed by other experts in astronomy, such as manufacturers and retailers of leading telescope equipment; and leading amateur astronomers, such as Anthony Wesley and leading members of Macarthur Astronomical Society and other Societies, to foster the science of astronomy within the community.

== Students Night ==
The Forum holds Annual Students Nights on the second Monday of December, when students are invited to present their latest astronomy research projects. The inaugural Student's Night was held in December 2015, with students Vina Hing & Linh Thuy Nguyen from Prairiewood High School presenting their research, using iTelescope, into eclipsing binary stars.

== Space Rocks ==
In July, 2018, Macarthur Astronomy Forum and The Australian Botanic Garden collaborated to hold "Space Rocks", bringing two international figures, Geoffrey Notkin a meteorite hunter and television presenter from Tucson, Arizona, United States and Amy Shira Teital, a space historian and YouTube presenter from Canada, to Macarthur. This sellout event was the first Forum at which an entry fee was charged.

== See also ==
- List of astronomical societies
- Official Website
- Complete list of guest speakers since January 2008
