= Geraint F. Lewis =

Welsh astrophysicist (b1969)

Geraint Francis Lewis
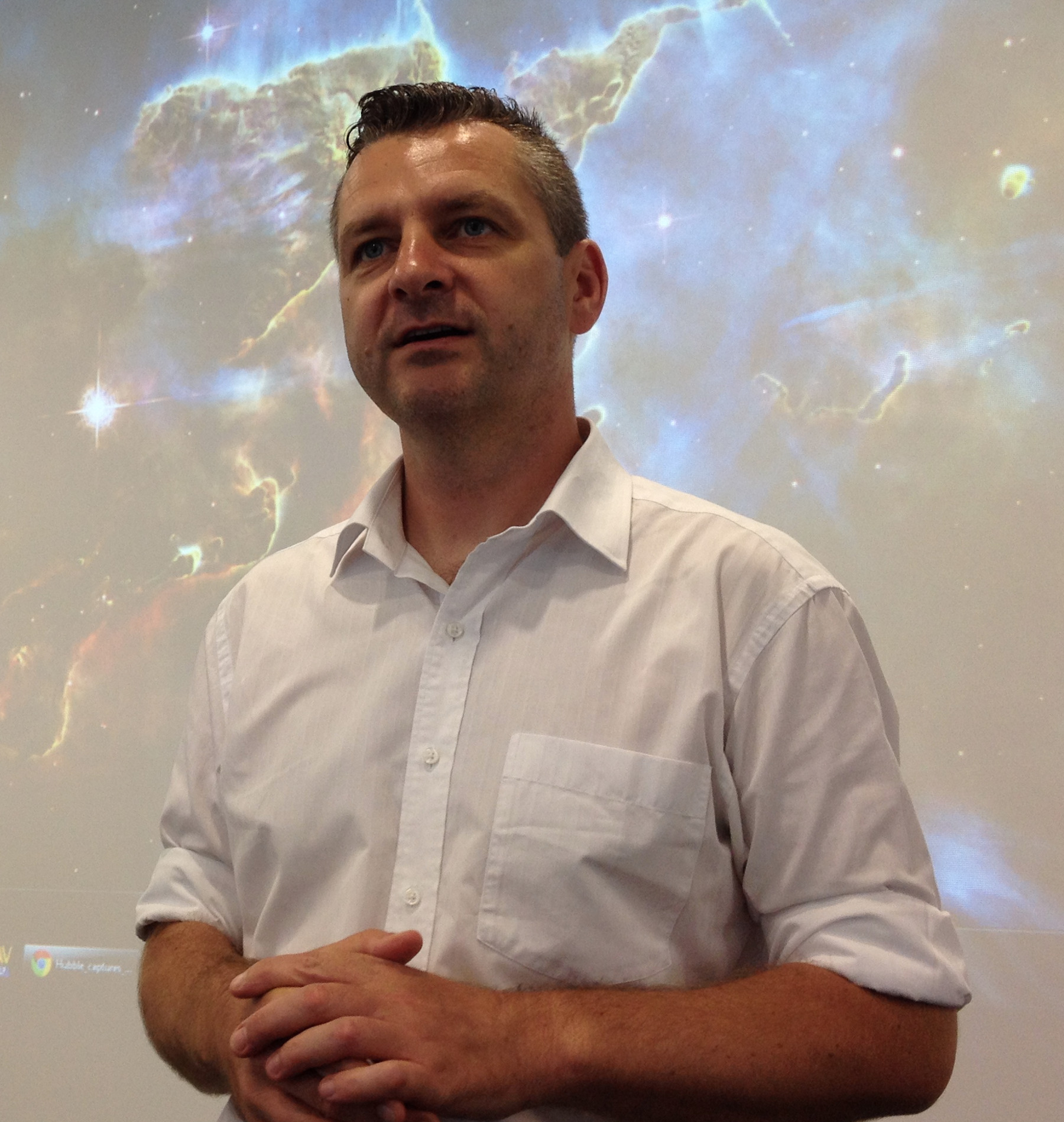
- Lewis at the Sydney Institute for Astronomy at the University of Sydney in 2018
- Born: 14 March 1969 (age 57); Neath, Wales
- Education: PhD
- Alma mater: University of Cambridge
- Awards: Walter Boas Medal (2016); David Allen Prize (2021)
- Scientific career
- Fields: Astrophysics
- Institutions: University of Sydney

Geraint Francis Lewis, FLSW (born 14 March 1969) is a Welsh astrophysicist, best known for his work on dark energy, gravitational lensing and galactic cannibalism. Lewis is a professor of astrophysics (teaching and research) at the Sydney Institute for Astronomy, part of the University of Sydney's School of Physics. He is head of the Gravitational Astrophysics Group. He was previously the associate head for research at the School of Physics, and held an Australian Research Council Future Fellowship between 2011 and 2015.

Lewis won the 2016 Walter Boas Medal in recognition of excellence in research in physics. In 2021, he was awarded the David Allen Prize of the Astronomical Society of Australia for exceptional achievement in astronomy communication. In April 2020, he was elected a Fellow of the Learned Society of Wales. He is also an elected fellow of the Royal Society of New South Wales.

Until the end of 2020, Lewis held the position of deputy director of the Sydney Informatics Hub, a Core Research Facility of the University of Sydney.

== Education ==
Originally from Wales, Lewis was born in Neath and raised in Seven Sisters and Crynant, completing schooling at Llangatwg Comprehensive and Neath Tertiary College. He completed his first degree at the University of London and PhD at the University of Cambridge's Institute of Astronomy. He has worked in the State University of New York, the University of Victoria in Canada, and the University of Washington in Seattle. After research positions in the US and Canada, he then became a research astronomer at the Anglo-Australian Observatory in 2000. In 2002, Lewis joined the University of Sydney, where he is currently the head of the Gravitational Astrophysics Group.

== Research fields ==
Lewis undertakes a broad spectrum of research in astronomy and cosmology. On the largest scales, his program involves looking at the influence of dark energy and dark matter on the evolution and ultimate fate of the universe. Another aspect of Lewis's research uses the phenomenon of gravitational lensing to probe the nature and distribution of the pervasive dark matter, and employing individual stars to magnify the hearts of quasars, the most luminous objects in the universe.

Closer to home, Lewis's research focuses upon galactic cannibalism, where small dwarf galaxies are torn apart by the much more massive Milky Way and Andromeda Galaxy. Using telescopes from around the world, including the 10-m Keck telescope in Hawaii, he has mapped the tell-tale signs of tidal disruption and destruction, providing important clues to how large galaxies have grown over time.

== Publications ==
As of August 2020, Lewis has published more than 400 scientific articles, numerous articles in the popular press, and three popular science books.

- Where did the Universe come from? And other cosmic questions by Chris Ferrie and Geraint F. Lewis, SourceBooks (Chicago), (Sept 2021,ISBN 978-1728238814)
- The Cosmic Revolutionary's Handbook: or how to beat the Big Bang by Luke A. Barnes and Geraint F. Lewis, Cambridge University Press (Feb 2020, ISBN 978-1108762090)
- A Fortunate Universe: Life in a finely tuned cosmos by Geraint F. Lewis and Luke A. Barnes, Cambridge University Press (Oct 2016, ISBN 978-1107156616)
- Dark Matter in Astroparticle and Particle Physics - Proceedings of the 6th International Heidelberg Conference, World Scientific Publishing Company, Australia, 2007, ISBN 978-981-281-434-0

== Public outreach ==
Lewis is noted for his public speaking about astronomy on radio and at public events. He was appointed Patron of Macarthur Astronomical Society in February 2020. With his colleague, Luke Barnes, he regularly discusses astronomy, cosmology and physics at his YouTube channel Alas Lewis & Barnes.

== Related lists ==
- List of astronomers

== See also ==
- General relativity
