= Campbelltown Arts Centre =

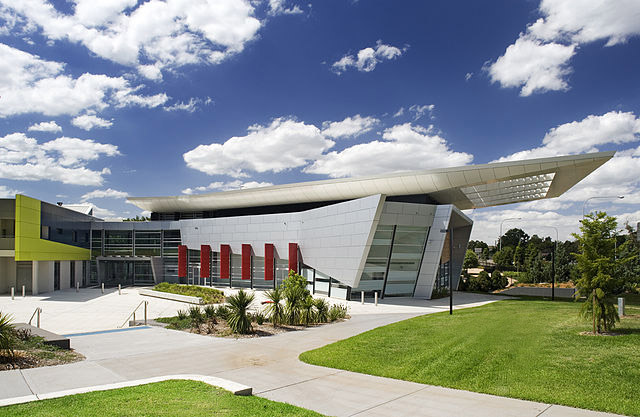
- Campbelltown Arts Centre
- Interactive map of the Campbelltown Arts Centre area

General information
- Type: Arts centre
- Location: Campbelltown, New South Wales
- Coordinates: 34°04′22″S 150°48′33″E
- Completed: 2005
- Owner: Campbelltown City Council

Design and construction
- Architect: Tanner Architects

Campbelltown Arts Centre (CAC) is a multidisciplinary contemporary arts centre located in Campbelltown, New South Wales, south west of Sydney, Australia. It is a cultural facility of Campbelltown City Council, assisted by other government funding and private sponsorships.

== History and description ==
The Centre opened in 2005, located on the traditional land of the Dharawal people.

The focus is on contemporary art, aiming "to forge collaborative exchanges between artists, disciplines and communities through the creation of new curatorial situations and challenging streams of practice". Its exhibits include visual arts, performance, dance, music, live art and emerging forms.

Hosted by Campbelltown City Council, Campbelltown Arts Centre is funded by the New South Wales Government through Create NSW, and by the federal government through the Australia Council for the Arts. The Centre also receives support from the Crown Resorts Foundation and the Packer Family Foundation.

=== Facilities ===
The Centre's complex includes the following facilities:

- exhibition spaces
- a 184-seat performance studio, which is also used for public lectures and private functions
- workshop and studio spaces
- residency apartment
- Sculpture Garden
- Japanese Garden
- amphitheatre
- café

== Collection ==
Campbelltown is home to one of the largest urban Indigenous communities in Australia and the Centre's permanent collection contains a lot of contemporary Indigenous art, including fibre art, paintings and work on paper. Artists represented include Joyce Mate, Yvonne Koolmatrie, Shirley MacNamara, Lena Yarinkura, Emily Kame Kngwarreye, James Gleeson, Queenie McKenzie, Pat Larter, John Mawurndjul, Yuhana Nashmi, Abdul Abdullah, and Kitty Kantilla.

The collection includes 19th-century lithographs, ceramics, work of the Wedderburn artists (who are heavily influenced by Indigenous art), sculpture and art installations. The Marsden Collection was bequeathed by lawyer and gay rights activist John Marsden in 2006. The Baycroft-Holt collection is a collection of contemporary Scottish art and includes the work of Ken Currie.

The Sculpture Garden was opened in 2001, with a permanent display of sculpture, which includes site-specific work.

== Programs ==
The Centre runs many public, artistic and educational projects and programs.

== Exhibitions ==
Two photographic exhibitions, featuring astro-photography by members of the Macarthur Astronomical Society were held in October 2010 and July 2012, known as "magnitude" and "magnitude II".

In February 2020, a survey exhibition of the work of Vernon Ah Kee, including his 2018 video work named The Island was mounted at the centre.
