= 2MCR =

Campbelltown, New South Wales; Australia
- Broadcast area: Part of South-western Sydney
- Frequency: 100.3 MHz FM
- Branding: 2MCR

Programming
- Format: Community radio

Ownership
- Owner: Macarthur Community Radio

History
- First air date: April 2001
- Former frequencies: 89.9 MHz FM (1989–199?); 100.5 MHz FM (199?–1999)
- Call sign meaning: 2 = New South Wales; Macarthur; Community; Radio

Technical information
- Transmitter coordinates: 34.1497°S 150.6716°E

Links
- Webcast: Listen Live
- Website: Official website

2MCR-FM is a Community Radio station in Sydney's South West broadcasting on 100.3 FM. The station broadcast covers Campbelltown, Camden and Wollondilly Shire. It is located at the Campbelltown RSL Club, Campbelltown, New South Wales.

== History ==
MCR started operations on 22 August 1989, which was the date of MCR's first public meeting. Broadcasting on 89.9FM due to licensing issues, new stations were allowed to broadcast for a total of 28 days per year. MCR did not have their own equipment and had to borrow the necessary equipment to broadcast for 28 days.

MCR split these 28 days up into four seven-day broadcasts which took place in makeshift temporary studios located at:

- St. Gregory's College, Campbelltown
- Western Suburbs Leagues Club, Leumeah
- Leumeah High School, Leumeah

Eventually, MCR moved to a permanent location—a house in Ingleburn which was swiftly converted into MCR's headquarters. "Radio House" was officially opened on 7 November 1993.

=== Radio House ===
In 1993, Campbelltown City Council donated to the station "Radio House"—an old double brick house just off the main shopping street in Ingleburn NSW. "Radio House" became a landmark icon for the station for a few years as a fixture to the station staying put in one place. This encouraged support from local businesses as well as more of the general public signing up to the station to become members in either support or to have a programme on air.

An Open Day at Radio House was held on 7 November 1993 in which several community groups attended, including the local Fire Brigade and the Campbelltown Spoon Club. This was during MCR's first broadcast at Radio House. For five years, MCR broadcast from Radio House until 1998, when MCR had to vacate the premises in order for the council to pull down the house to make way for a new shopping plaza carpark.

After putting out the call for an urgent new location in the local papers, an appropriate place was found in a shopping fitout in the City Arcade, Campbelltown. This space was generously donated by the at-the-time owner(s) of the City Arcade. MCR moved into the new premises promptly within the same year they moved out of Ingleburn, and the City Arcade location became the "New Radio House".

In 2002, the City Arcade was purchased by the Campbelltown RSL Club, which had just built new premises behind the Arcade. The station moved premises to inside the main doorway of the RSL Club.

=== Casual to full time broadcasting ===
MCR began broadcasting on 89.9FM as a casual basis for 28 days a year in 1989. After much discussion, the committee at the time split up the 28-day broadcasting limit to seven-day weeks, four weeks a year. In the mid 1990s, the station changed frequency to 100.5FM. This continued until 1998 when a temporary yearly license was issued to the station, enabling MCR to broadcast every day, 365 days a year. In 1999, MCR changed frequencies from 100.5FM to 100.3FM due to conflicting issues with other stations. In 2001 MCR was granted a permanent full-time license, which came with a name change to 2MCR. In 2013, 2MCR changed their logo and also changed the name of the station. THE HEART OF MACARTHUR was replaced with THE SOUNDS OF MACARTHUR. The station also changed their name to 100.3FM 2MCR, but still keeping 2mcr as its call sign.

=== World record attempt ===
From 1 to 5 June 2002, station member Matt Fulton set a new milestone in the world of radio, beating the Guinness World Record for Longest Radio DJ Marathon by just over an hour. The stunt saw Matt stay on air non-stop (with authorised breaks provided by Guinness) for a length of 4 days 7 hours 14 minutes and 36 seconds. The attempt attracted national attention, including various guests and celebrities. Channel 10's Rove Live conducted a live cross 81 hours into the attempt. A large crowd witnessed the final moment countdown outside and inside the studios.

== Station presidents ==
- 2015–2016: Alex Parker
- 2014–2015; 2018-2021: Mike Runcorn
- 2008–2010: Gordon Manning
- 2002–2008; 2010–2014: Trevar Langlands
- 1999–2000: Ralph E. Parker
- 1996–1997: Carol Collins
- 1995–1996; 2016–2018: Rodney Simpson
- 1991–1995; 1997–1999; 2000–2001: John Evans
- 1989–1991; 2001–2002: John Spora
- 2021-2024 John Kemp

== Life members ==
- David Tulk
- Frank Thatcher
- John Evans
- Ian Donaghy
- Peter Mounsey
- Ralph E Parker
- Trevar Langlands
- Greg Hilder

== Honourable mentions ==
- August 2006 – One of the station's longest running programs, Composer's Gallery, marked 500 episodes on-air with presenter Gordon Manning hoping to present another 500.
