= Prairiewood High School =

Location
- 203–215 Restwell Road, Wetherill Park, South Western Sydney, New South Wales; Australia; 33°51′26″S 150°54′16″E

Information
- Type: Government-funded co-educational dual modality partially academically selective and comprehensive secondary day school
- Motto: Latin: Per Ardua (Through Striving)
- Founded: 1984; 42 years ago
- School district: Cowpasture
- Educational authority: New South Wales Department of Education
- Principal: Christine Roberts
- Enrolment: ~1,200 (2018)
- Colours: Green and yellow
- Website: prairiewoo-h.schools.nsw.gov.au

Prairiewood High School is a government-funded co-educational dual modality partially academically selective and comprehensive secondary day school located in Wetherill Park, a south-western suburb of Sydney, New South Wales, Australia.

Established in 1984, the school caters for approximately 1,200 students from Year 7 to Year 12, including 74 percent of whom come from a language background other than English. The school is operated by the New South Wales Department of Education.

== Campus ==
Prariewood High School is one of the only High Schools in Sydney to have an observatory, alongside an Astronomy elective. Inside the observatory is a 12" Meade LX200 Schmidt–Cassegrain Telescope on a computerised German Equatorial Mount.

Prariewood High School has an agricultural facility, which houses livestock and various fruit and vegetables.

== Notable alumni ==
- Elie Abwi (Toneshifterz) – Hardstyle DJ and music producer, attended Prairiewood High School from 2000 to 2006. Widely regarded as the face of Australian Hardstyle, he has performed at major festivals worldwide including Defqon.1, Tomorrowland and Electric Daisy Carnival, produced multiple official festival anthems, and pioneered the "PSYSTYLE" fusion of hardstyle and psytrance.

== See also ==
- List of government schools in New South Wales
- List of selective high schools in New South Wales
