= Campbelltown Rotary Observatory =

Observatory in New South Wales, Australia

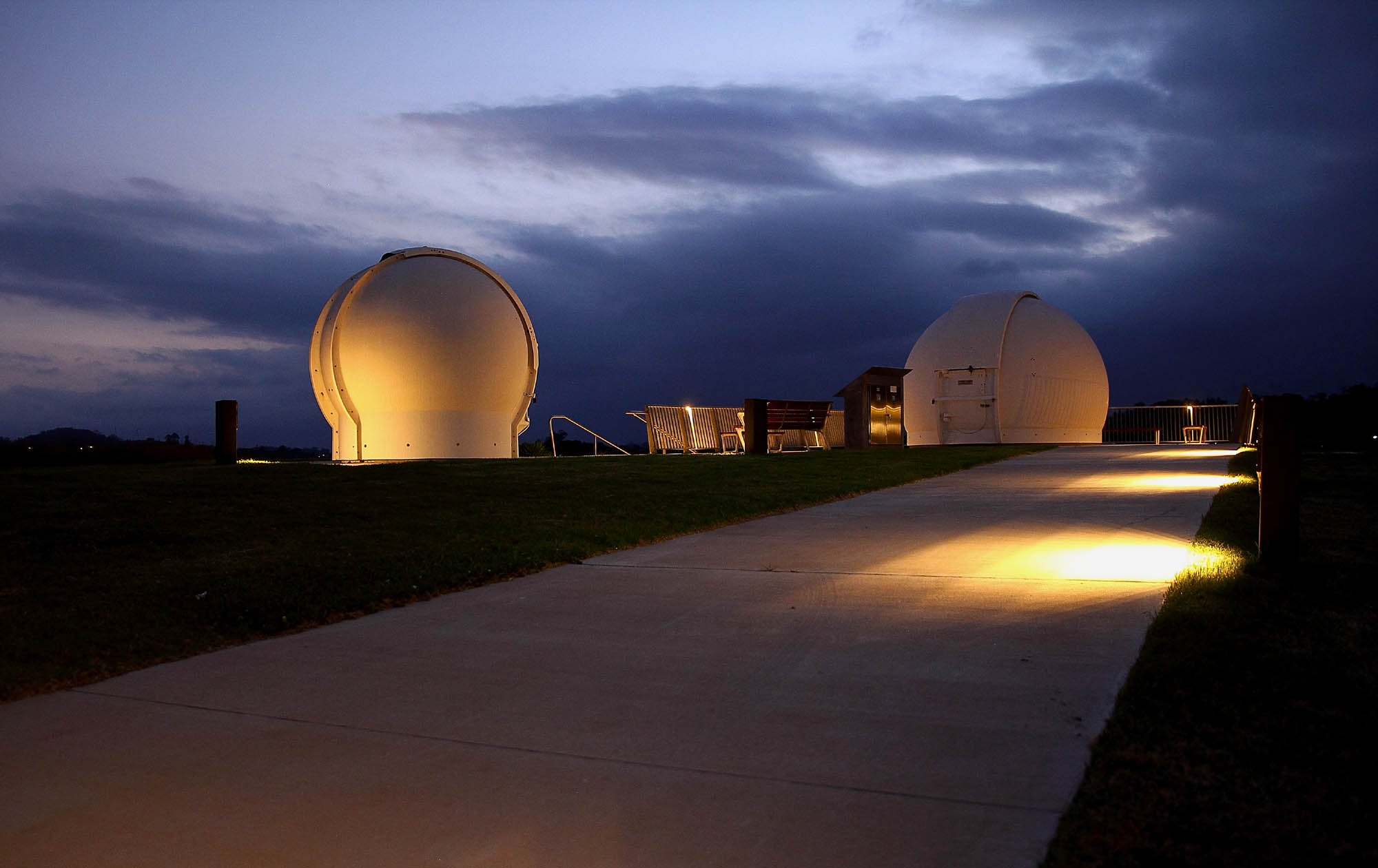
- Organization: Western Sydney University
- Location: Campbelltown, New South Wales, Australia
- Coordinates: 34.07°S 150.8°E
- Altitude: 100 m (330 ft)
- Established: 15 July 2000
- Website: Official Website

Telescopes
- Meade LX-200 16-inch: Schmidt-Cassegraine
- Meade LX-200 12-inch: Schmidt-Cassegraine
- Related media on Commons

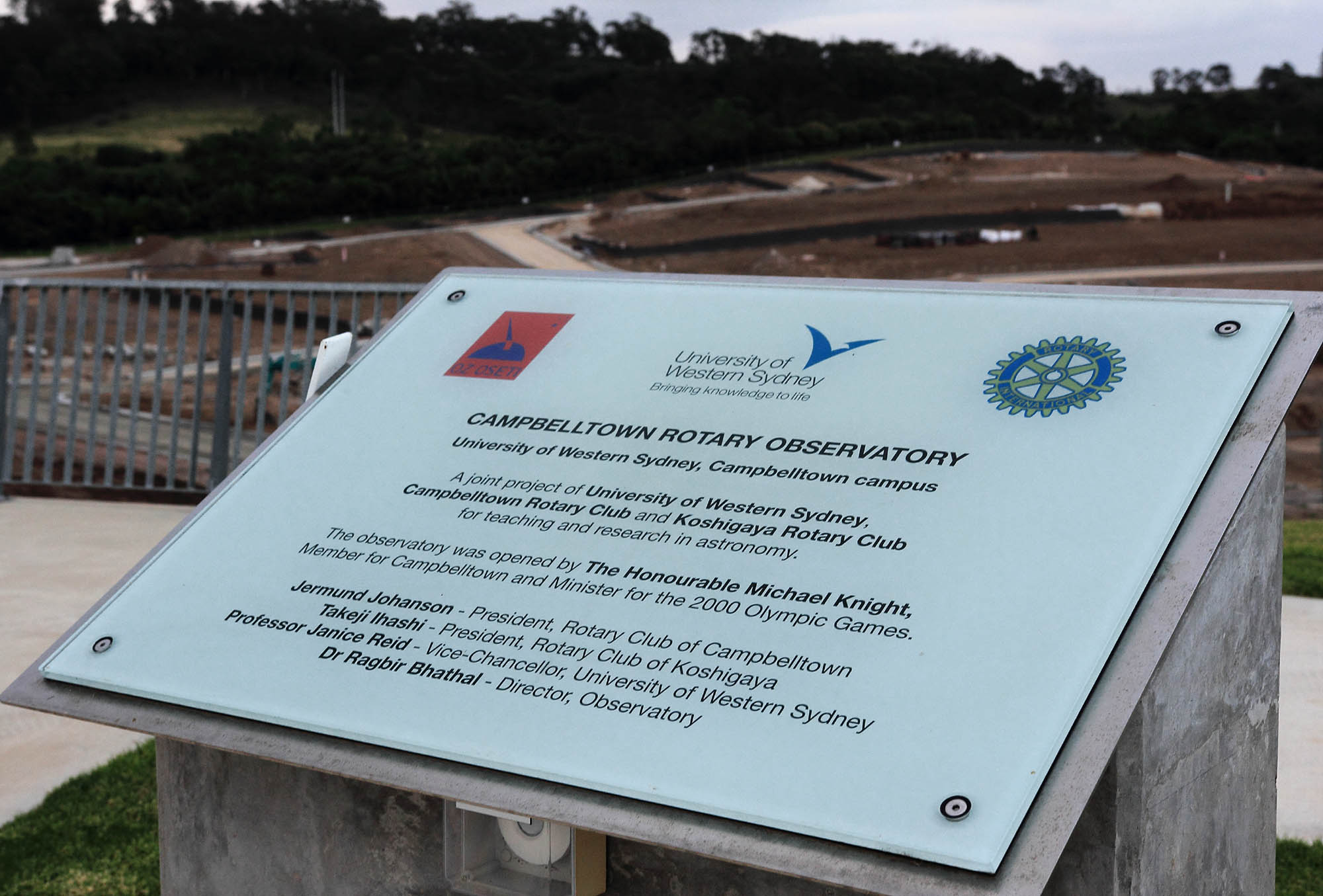
A new plaque at the Campbelltown Rotary Observatory indicates the change of observatory name. The plaque is undated but was placed there in 2015.

Campbelltown Rotary Observatory in Campbelltown, New South Wales, Australia, was opened in 2000 and is owned by Western Sydney University. It consists of twin domes of 4.5m and 2.9m diameter. The patron of the Observatory was the late Sir Arthur C Clarke CBE. The Observatory Director (2000-2022) was the late Dr. Ragbir Bhathal. It was originally named UWS Rotary Observatory.

== Objectives and activities ==
The observatory is utilised by Western Sydney University for its Optical SETI Research Project and as a field laboratory. It conducts the National Project on Significant Australian Physicists, Astrophysicists and Engineers and the National Project on Aboriginal Astronomy. It also organises a community outreach program, including observing nights and public astronomy lectures, often in conjunction with Macarthur Astronomical Society and the Macarthur Astronomy Forum.

Its stated mission objective is to:

- Train future scientists and engineers.
- Serve as a laboratory for engineering students to carry out innovative projects.
- Undertake education research in engineering physics and related engineering disciplines.
- Advance the search for Extra Terrestrial Intelligence in the optical spectrum.
- Record and assess the major developments and discoveries of Australia's significant astrophysicists, physicists and engineers.
- Advance the study of 40,000 years of Aboriginal astronomy.
- Undertake community engagement activities.

== History ==
The construction of the observatory was principally funded in cash and kind from the Campbelltown Branch of Rotary International and other local organisations. It was opened on 15 July 2000 by the Hon. Michael Knight (MP for Campbelltown and Minister for the 2000 Olympics) on a small hilltop on land at the rear of the University of Western Sydney Campbelltown Campus. The University was renamed Western Sydney University in 2015.

Both domes were equipped with a Meade LX200 Schmidt–Cassegrain telescope (400mm and 300mm diameter respectively).

In December 2008, Dr Bhathal detected a sharp 'laser look-alike' signal emanating from the globular cluster 47 Tucanae. However, despite further searches, the signal has yet to be replicated.

In 2013 the land on which the observatory stood was sold to make way for the new residential suburb of Macarthur Heights and the observatory domes were temporarily closed and removed, while the hill was bulldozed. The observatory was reopened in 2015 in a new position closer to the University campus buildings. The developers of the new estate of Macarthur Heights recognised the astronomical heritage of the site by naming new streets with an astronomical theme and by erecting an astro-sculpture known as the Gates of Light in a public park close to the new and old observatory sites. The first public night in the new location was held in collaboration with Macarthur Astronomical Society on 5 December 2015.

Originally named as UWS Rotary Observatory, since its relocation in 2015 it has been known as Campbelltown Rotary Observatory.

== See also ==
- List of astronomical observatories
- Lists of universities and colleges
