= Macarthur Astronomical Society =

- Abbreviation: MAS
- Formation: 15 January 1996
- Legal status: Non-profit organization
- Purpose: Foster the science of astronomy
- Location: Sydney, Australia
- Region served: Macarthur Region
- Members: 100–140
- President: John Rombi
- Website: www.macastro.org.au

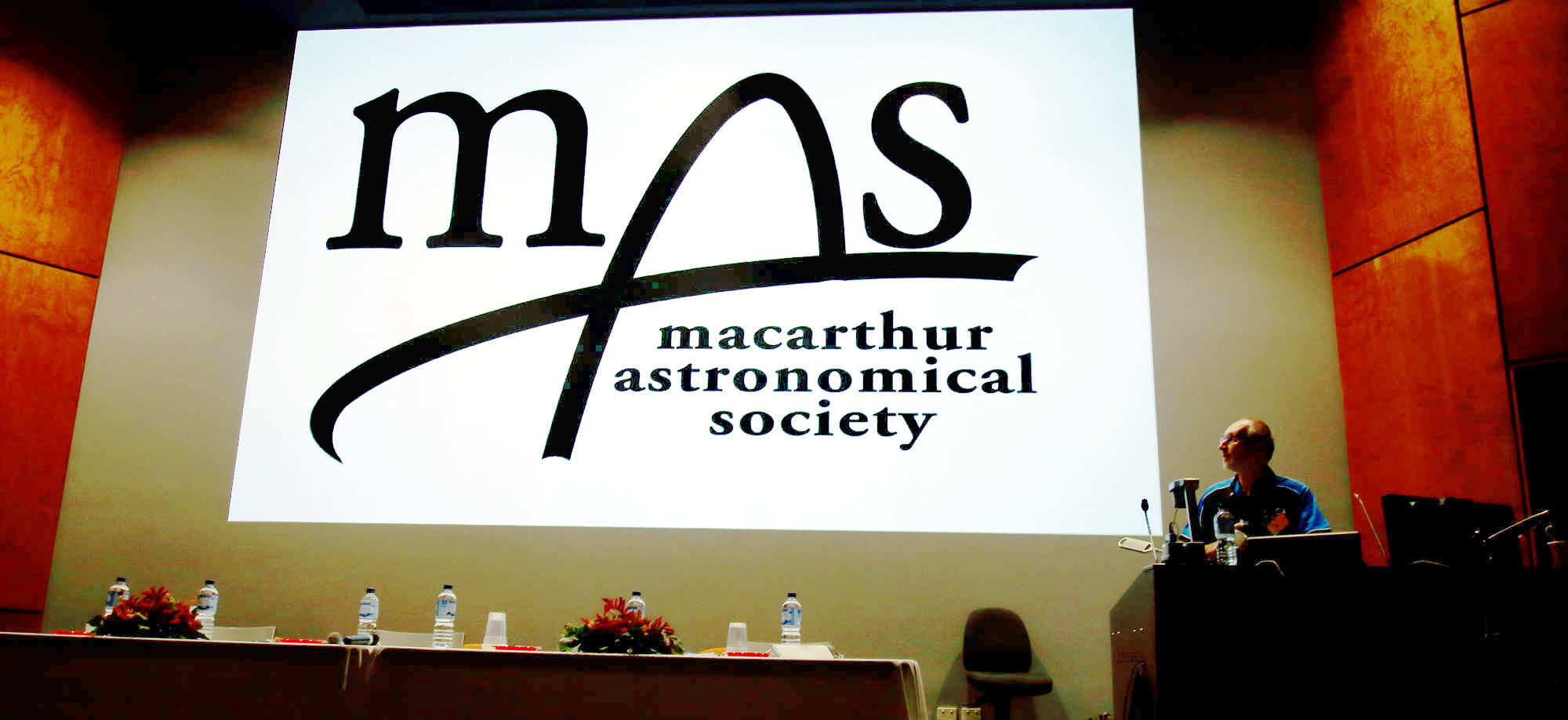
A Macarthur Astronomy Forum being introduced by Macarthur Astronomical Society President, Tony Law.

Macarthur Astronomical Society is an organisation of amateur astronomers, based in the Macarthur Region of outer South Western Sydney, New South Wales, Australia.

== Objectives and activities ==
The constitutionally adopted objectives of the Society are: (i) to foster the science of Astronomy; (ii) to organise observational field nights for the purpose of carrying out astronomical observation; (iii) to assist and give advice regarding astronomical instrumentation; and (iv) to participate in/co-operate with other scientific societies and groups with a similar scientific interest in astronomy.

In keeping with these objectives, the society's three core activities are:

1. The Macarthur Astronomy Forum.
2. Dark sky astronomical observing nights for members. These are held regularly at several locations: the Dudley Chesham Sports ground at The Oaks, owned by Wollondilly Council; and other properties from Oakdale to Belanglo, for the purpose of telescopic observing and astro-imaging.
3. Public outreach events, which include visits to schools and other community organisations; and open nights for the general public, generally held at either the Campbelltown Rotary Observatory at Western Sydney University or the Dudley Chesham Sports Ground, The Oaks.

== Formation and management ==
Formed in 1996 in Ingleburn, New South Wales by Philip Ainsworth, Macarthur Astronomical Society Inc. is registered as an independent Incorporated Association by the NSW Fair Trading. Its affairs are governed by its own constitution and managed by an elected Management Committee. As required by NSW Fair Trading, the Secretary of the society acts as Public Officer. The Society is approved by the NSW Commissioner of Police for the purpose of an exemption from obtaining a laser pointer permit.

== Macarthur Astronomy Forum ==
The monthly meetings of the Society provide a platform for professional astronomers and prominent amateur astronomers. These meetings were renamed the Macarthur Astronomy Forum in 2011. Guest speakers have included Nobel Laureate Professor Brian Schmidt, Professor Bryan Gaensler, Australia's Astronomer at Large Professor Fred Watson, Mark Phillips and NASA astronaut Greg Chamitoff.

== Office holders ==
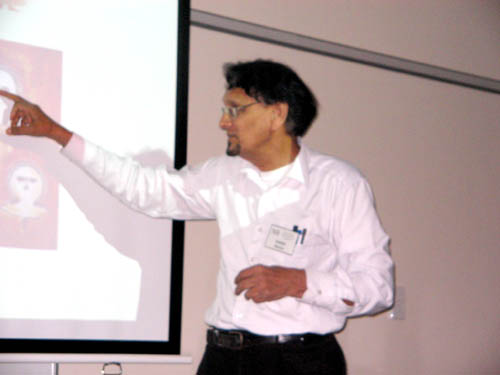
Ragbir Bhathal, Western Sydney University, Patron of Macarthur Astronomical Society, 1997–2011

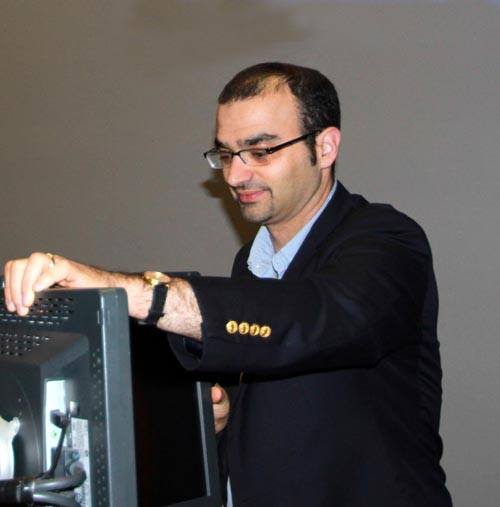
Bryan Gaensler, University of Toronto, Patron of Macarthur Astronomical Society 2009–2020

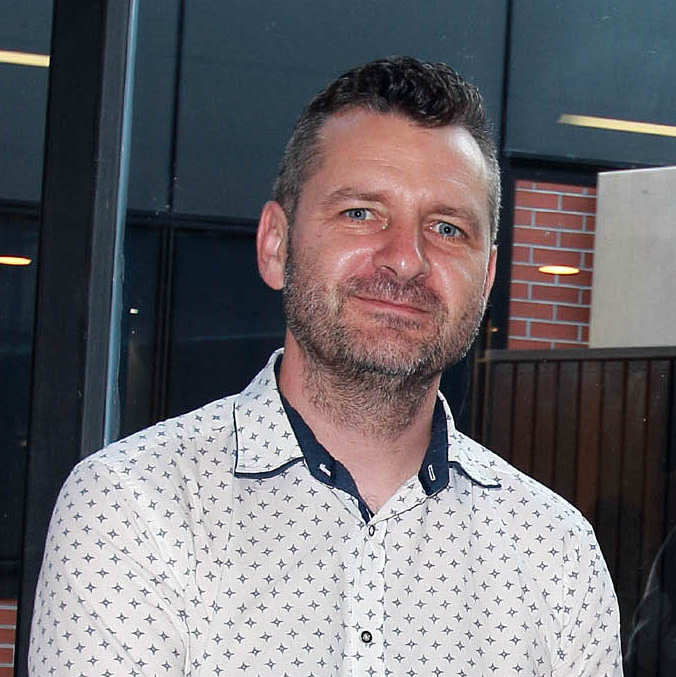
Geraint F. Lewis, University of Sydney, Patron of Macarthur Astronomical Society since 2020

=== List of Patrons ===
- 1996–2011 Ragbir Bhathal, (Western Sydney University).
- 2009–2020 Bryan Gaensler (University of Toronto, Canada); Young Australian of the Year 1999; and former Director of the ARC Centre of Excellence for All-sky Astrophysics (CAASTRO).
- 2020–current Geraint Lewis (University of Sydney).

Patrons are appointed by the Management Committee. Between 2009 and 2011 the Society had dual Patrons.

=== Presidents ===
- 1996–2000 Phillip Ainsworth
- 2000–2007 Noel Sharpe
- 2007–2011 John Rombi
- 2011–2012 Trevor Rhodes
- 2012–2015 Chris Malikoff
- 2015–2019 Tony Law
- 2019-2020 Allan Hobbs
- 2020– current John Rombi

=== Management Committee ===
The committee is tasked with the total management of the affairs of the Society and aims to mix youth with experience. It meets monthly and consists of a President, Vice-President, Secretary, Treasurer and three other Committee Members. Office bearers are elected by the membership at an Annual General Meeting, normally held in April each year. Whilst a ballot is provided for, the Society has traditionally never received more than one nomination per position, thus a ballot has never been held.

== Awards ==
On 9 December 2014, MAS won the University of Western Sydney Excellence in Partnership Award. The University awards this to recognize the many and highly valued contributions of the University's community partners. The accompanying citation reads: "The Macarthur Astronomical Society has, in partnership with the Campbelltown Rotary Observatory, conducted astronomy talks and activities to bring the latest advances in physics, astrophysics and high technology to the community. This enables the community to participate in debates about science in an informed manner with experts and politicians."

== Youth in Astronomy ==
The Society instituted an annual Students Night in 2015, to encourage school children from Prairiewood High School to study the science of astronomy and report their research findings to the Society's Macarthur Astronomy Forum in December each year.

During 2018, a Student Mentoring Programme was introduced to assist year 7 – 11 students at Broughton Anglican College to complete a scientific astronomical investigation as part of their science courses.

== Publications and exhibitions ==
=== Journal ===
The Society's journal "Prime Focus" was published monthly, for the benefit of members, between 1996 and 2012. Initially the publication was a printed edition but since 2009 it was distributed electronically. In 2011, the first colour editions were published and printed copies became available again. The journal ceased in October 2012 but resumed for a brief period in 2020.

=== Publications ===
The Society has published two DVDs, "magnitude" and "magnitude II", both containing the best astro-images taken by its members.

=== Authors ===
The Society has had the following authors of astronomy books within its ranks.

- The late Robert Bee (member): author of "Heavens Above – A Binocular Guide to the Southern Skies" and "Star Hopping To The Messiers".
- Chris Malikoff (member): Ice In Space "2009 Compendium"'
- Professor Bryan Gaensler (Patron): author of "Extreme Cosmos".
- The late Dr. Ragbir Bhathal (Hon. Member): author of several books, including: "Under the Southern Cross: A Brief History of Astronomy in Australia"; "Australian Astronomers: Achievements at the Frontiers of Astronomy"; "Australian Backyard Astronomy" and "Mt. Stromlo Observatory – From Bush Observatory to the Nobel Prize".
- Prof Geraint Lewis (Patron) : author (with Dr Luke Barnes) of "A Fortunate Universe" and "The Cosmic Revolutionary's Handbook".

=== Exhibitions ===
The Society has held major public exhibitions displaying the astro-photographic work of its members:

- magnitude in October 2010. at the Campbelltown Arts Centre.
- magnitude II in July 2012 at the Campbelltown Arts Centre.
- magnitude III in February 2014 at Western Sydney University.
- Photographers of the Month in June and July 2018 at Camden Library, Narellan

== Observatory ==
In 2011, the Society set up a sub-committee to seek a suitable site – remote from city lighting, yet within easy reach of Campbelltown/Camden – at which to locate its first astronomical observatory. In 2012, a suitable site was identified in the Dharawal National Park and the Society pursued opportunities to secure use of the site. The location was originally the site of the North Cliff coal mine, operated by BHP. Whilst anticipating some opposition to placing an observatory in a national park, the society was inspired by the Australian Astronomical Observatory in the Warrumbungles National Park and the concept received much local support.

If successful, the observatory would have been used for astronomical research, public outreach, astro-imaging and members private observing. Whilst the proposal was welcomed in the community and supported by the mine lease-holder, it did not gain the necessary government support.

== Volunteer computing ==
The Society organises a volunteer computing team for the purpose of carrying out scientific research using the Berkeley Open Infrastructure for Network Computing (BOINC) Project Management middleware platform, which allows users to contribute to a range of scientific computing projects at the same time. Volunteer computing is often also referred to as Citizen science, Distributed computing or Grid computing. The team is currently working as volunteers on projects for theSkyNet, SETI@home, Einstein@home, asteroids@home, LHC@home and other BOINC projects.

== See also ==
- List of telescopes of Australia
- List of astronomical societies
- Macarthur Astronomy Forum
