= Ragbir Bhathal =

Australian astronomer and author

Ragbir Bhathal FRSN FRAS
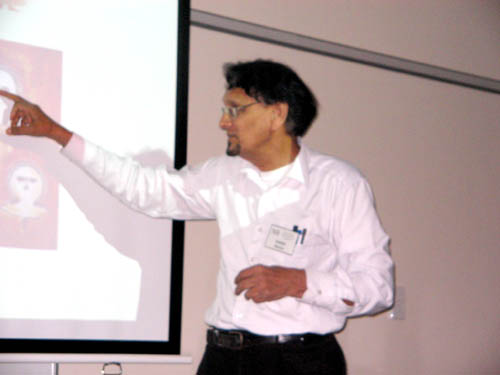
- Bhathal in 2010.

Personal details
- Died: 30 November 2022
- Occupation: Astronomer

Ragbir Bhathal was an Australian astronomer and author, based at the Western Sydney University (WSU), Australia. He was known for his work on Optical Search for Extra-Terrestrial Intelligence (OSETI). He continued lecturing and research at WSU until he died at the age of 86 on 30 November 2022.

== Career ==
He did his Ph.D. in magnetism at the University of Queensland. He served as a UNESCO consultant on science policy for the ASEAN group of nations, as an Adviser to the Federal Minister for Science and was the Project Director for the million dollar Sydney Observatory restoration building program.

He designed and built the twin dome Campbelltown Rotary Observatory at the WSU Campbelltown Campus, was Director of the Observatory 2000-2022 and was Patron of Macarthur Astronomical Society from 1997 to 2011.

On 16 May 2018, The Macarthur Advertiser newspaper reported in its printed version that Dr. Bhathal "was recently elected as a Fellow of the London-based Royal Astronomical Society".

== Research ==
Dr Bhathal carried out research in nanosecond laser pulsed communications, astrophysics, galactic surveys, astronomical image analysis and processing at UWS. In December 2008, he observed a sharp 'laser look-alike' signal emanating from the globular cluster 47 Tucanae. However, despite further searches, the signal has yet to be replicated.

== Awards ==
- Fellow, Royal Astronomical Society.
- Fellow, Royal Society of New South Wales.
- Bicentennial Royal Society of NSW Medal for services to science and research.
- CJ Dennis Award for excellence in natural history writing.
- Nancy Keesing Fellowship by the State Library of NSW.

== Published books ==
- Australian Astronomer John Tebbutt: The Life And World Of The Man On The 100 Dollar Note.
- Under the Southern Cross: A Brief History of Astronomy in Australia (1991) (co-author with G.White).
- Australian Astronomers: Achievements at the Frontiers of Astronomy (1996).
- Australian Backyard Astronomy (2006) (co-author with J.Bhathal).
- Profiles: Australian Women Scientists.
- Selected Documents In Aboriginal Astronomy.
- Aboriginal Astronomy.
- Mt Stromlo Observatory: From Bush Observatory to the Nobel Prize (2013) (co-author with Ralph Sutherland and Harvey Butcher).
- University Physics With Modern Physics(2011) (co-author with H.Young & R.Freedman).
- Communication with extraterrestrial intelligence (2011).
- The Search for Extraterrestrial Intelligence (SETI) in the Optical Spectrum III. (2001) (co-author with S.Kingsley).
- The Search for Extraterrestrial Intelligence (2000).
- Scientific and Cultural Aspects of the Search for Extraterrestrial Intelligence (1998).
- Searching For ET (1996).
- Astronomy for the Higher School Certificate (1993).
