= Brownlow Hill Estate =

- Location within New South Wales Location within Australia
- 34°02′33″S 150°38′16″E
- Location: Brownlow Hill Loop Road, Brownlow Hill, Wollondilly Shire, New South Wales, Australia

History
- Built: 1827–

Site notes
- Architect(s): Homestead layout and farm established by Alexander Macleay; first Colonial Secretary of NSW

New South Wales Heritage Register
- Official name: Brownlow Hill Estate; Lowe's Hill; Glendaruel (Glendaurel)
- Type: State heritage (landscape)
- Designated: 25 January 2001
- Reference no.: 1489
- Type: Agriculture
- Category: Farming and Grazing
- Builders: George Macleay (Alexander Macleay's son)

Brownlow Hill Estate is a heritage-listed former residence and working farm and now residence and dairy farm located at Brownlow Hill Loop Road in the outer south-western Sydney settlement of Brownlow Hill, New South Wales, Australia. It was designed and established by Alexander Macleay and built from 1827 by George Macleay, his son). It is also known as Lowe's Hill and Glendaruel (Glendaurel). The property is privately owned. It was added to the New South Wales State Heritage Register on 25 January 2001.

== History ==
=== Colonial history ===
When Governor Lachlan Macquarie toured the Cow Pastures in 1815 he traversed the area from the foot of Mount Hunter in a north-west direction toward Mount Hunter Creek (Rivulet) and then in a northern direction towards the Nepean River. At the close of the day he wrote that "it is my intention to form an establishment here for at least three separate herds of the Government horned cattle, at three distinct stations". The main farm and Government Cottage was established at Cawdor which Macquarie made his base on his return tour in 1822.

On Friday 11 January 1815 Macquarie inspected another of the stations from Cawdor along Mount Hunter Creek to Brownlow. Originally called Lowe's Hill, Governor Macquarie renamed it to Brownlow Hill in 1820 at the request of Commissioner Bigge, in honour of his friend Lord Brownlow.

Peter Murdock, who accompanied Macquarie, was later (in the mid-1820s) granted 809 hectares (2,000 acres) to the north-west of Mount Hunter rivulet in the parish of Werombi. A small cottage now referred to as "the roundhouse" is situated on this grant, which was known locally as Glendaruel (Glendaurel), and it is believed that this cottage may have been associated with the Government station established by Macquarie. Although it is similar in form to the former gatehouse at Winbourne, Mulgoa and a residence at Molong (late 1830s), both of these are now demolished.

==== Macleay family ====
The 607 hectares (1,500 acres), later surveyed as 673 hectares (1,663 acres), of land to its north, Brownlow Hill, the former Government stock farm was a grant by purchase to Colonial Secretary Alexander Macleay in May 1827. Macleay purchased Murdock's adjacent grant, known as Glenderual (or Glendaruel, Glendaurel) in November 1828 for A£3,000. The amalgamated Brownlow Hill and Glenderual estates were managed by Macleay's sons George (1805-1891) and James Robert (1811-1892) from 1828 and by George following James Macleay's departure for England in 1837.

Once stocked, the property was left in the care of an overseer.

In May 1828 Alexander's son, George Macleay, who had arrived in November 1827, was managing the farm at Brownlow Hill, where he had erected a cottage by early 1829. Farming duties were to be shared with his brother James.

In February 1828 Fanny Macleay described Brownlow Hill, a description that is also relevant to Glenderual:

' I will only say that I was quite delighted with the place, I thought it was very beautiful in its wild garb for wild it is at present. It is situated in the Cowpastures about 40 miles hence on one side watered by the Nepean and on two other sides its possesses Hunter's Creek [Mount Hunter Rivulet] and some other [sic] prettily named Creek (I forget what they called it) [Wattle Creek] ... the land is charmingly undulating, hill and dale, sloping in a graceful manner on all sides. The Soil particularly rich, they say ... covered it is with fine long grass... and sufficiently covered and ornamented with that beautiful species of the Eucalyptus genus, commonly known here by the name of the Apple Tree (probably Angophora floribunda). This is the only pretty Tree the country possesses its foliage is really green, its stem very pictoresque [sic], and it is only to be found in good fat ground.'

On 21 November 1829 Fanny Macleay reported on her brother George's departure on Sturt's expedition along the Murray and Darling Rivers (a blazed tree near the Round House commemorates the starting point for this expedition), adding:

'Poor James is the farmer now at the Cowpastures and a more busy time he could not have had ...He is now engaged with sheep sheering ... then Hay making and harvest immediately follows ... But to what use is all of this but to chain my Father's pockets? since the wool fetches no price, and when we have any thing to sell we find its value has fallen 70 per cent since we purchased ...'

In November 1833 she wrote "farming affairs look very ill for there has been no rain for many a day" and on 12 December 1833:

'George & James are both at Brownlow Hill busily engaged with their harvest, which promises to be better than was expected some little time ago. The men have lately given them a great deal of trouble; indeed generally over the country there reigns a bad spirit among the convicts, owing to the Govrs mistaken lenient measures.'

Within George Macleay's period of residency (1828-1859) until recent times Brownlow Hill was to be tenant farmed with the Glenderual river flats designated Farm no. 4.

Sidman's account of the history of the area, written in the 1930s, claims that the first home was on the flat above Mt Hunter Creek and that a stone quarry was opened on the estate, although this is not corroborated by other authors. Despite a lack of detail, there are references to her brothers` improvements on the farm in letters sent by Fanny Macleay to William, another brother in Cuba, and when Baron von Hugel who visited the "charming house" in 1834 as it was nearing completion. Von Hugel considered the farm (Glendaurel), two miles away from the new house, as having no equal of any he had seen in NSW for its 'cleanliness and orderliness`, and differing considerably from others such as Regentville, possessed paddocks cleared of stumps. A large garden and a small pond with many platypus adjoined the farm which von Hugel commented "would certainly be better located near the homestead, when this is completed".

The Round House is popularly believed to have been one of the government herdsmen's' huts built by Macquarie in the 1810s. However, the Picturesque taste evident in its design (and also the design of Brownlow Hill and its landscape) suggests the hand of the Macleay family. Its octagonal form is unusual in Australia although similar designs (typically for gate lodges) were adapted for the gate lodge at the Cox property, Winbourne, Mulgoa (sketched by Hardy Wilson in 1916 for his Old Colonial Architecture in New South Wales and Tasmania (the lodge has since been demolished), the Betts property, the Round House, Vale Head, Molong (demolished) and an 1830s house associated with St Patrick's Church, Singleton. A comparable and contemporary house is Chief Justice Francis Forbes' Edinglassie, Emu Plains (c. 1826, demolished). James Broadbent, in "The Australian Colonial House" writes that 'Edinglassie was a simplified, antipodean version of the rustic cottage ornes popularised by Papworth in Ackermann's Repository of Arts, Literature, Fashions & c., or his own Rural Residences [1818]'.

About 100 metres (330 ft) south of the Round House is a quarry in the Flaggy Creek bed, a tributary of the Mount Hunter Rivulet. The quarry was a source of Wiannamatta stone (advertised in the press of the 1820s - '30s as Cowpastures stone), a highly-figured mudstone used for paving (i.e. flagstones) at Brownlow Hill (the console table base, veranda and entrance hall flagging) and Elizabeth Bay House (the entrance hall and flagging, saloon stair and upper floor chimneypieces). The Camden Park portico columns are reputedly from this quarry. The quarry provides a rare instance of a surviving connection between early houses and the source of their materials and is an important archaeological site.

Records held by the Botanic Gardens indicate that G. Macleay Esquire was sent a number of plants during this period. In June 1832 he was sent 12 olive Plants and 6 ornamental shrubs and in July 1834: 50 vine cuttings, 1 Evergreen Oak, 2 White Broom and 12 ornamental shrubs. As one of the Colony's prominent farmers, George Macleay received two sets of cuttings, 40 from Mr Busby's vines, one set being for Captain Dumaresq in June 1836.

Conrad Martens drew Brownlow Hill homestead in 1836 showing that it was sited on a flattened hill which was not completely cleared of its native vegetation. Adjacent land to the west was added to the property through a grant to George Macleay. In 1836 George Macleay wrote to his sister requesting Loudon's Encyclopaedia of Gardening. Macleay's ornamental additions of a sundial bearing the inscription "George Macleay 1836" and a Maldon sandstone vase on a pedestal situated in the centre of flower beds cut in the lawn are clear indications of the sophistication with which the garden was planned and developed. Other additions such as the aviary in the flower garden appear to have been inspired by Thomas Shepherd's lectures and modelled on illustrations and ideas, especially Mrs Lawrence's garden Drayton Green, from Loudon's Gardener's Magazine, many illustrations and articles from which appeared in his 1838 publication" The Suburban Gardener and Villa Companion". Although not substantiated, it is likely that George Macleay had assistance in implementing ideas gleaned from his reading. The 1865 obituary in the Horticultural Magazine and Gardeners' and Amateurs' Calendar, for Robert Henderson, the gardener at Alexander Macleay's Elizabeth Bay at the time of von Hugel's Sydney visit, stated that he "had severally superintended the laying out of the gardens appertaining to the late residence of George Macleay, Esq ".

More plants were sent from the Botanic Gardens to George Macleay in 1844 - the most unusual inclusion for the time was Eucalypts and Melaleuca - trees not usually planted by the colonists, especially in the country. By February L'Avergne was "very busy with grapes", preparing enough for 30 gallons of wine. Journal entries in March mention figs, a new white grape named "Cornoshant" and walnuts growing in the garden. Both the von Hugel and Boswell accounts indicate clear connections between William Macarthur at Camden Park and the Macleays at Brownlow Hill. Sales of plants noted in William Macarthur's notebooks indicate that during the early 1850s a number of significant additions were made to the garden, some of which are a feature of the property today.

Samuel Mossman and Thomas Banister visited Brownlow Hill at this time, approaching the estate from Vanderville, the property of John Wild(e), which encompassed the village now known as The Oaks. They passed over a range of hills, likely the area now known as Glenmore.

On an 1848 visit George Macleay's niece (daughter of his sister Margaret) Annabella Boswell commented:

"I am much interested in the botanical books in the library here, and wish I knew something of botany. It is however, a great pleasure for me to look at the drawings of flowers and fruit, the former more various than I had imagined to exist. We recognised in these books many of our own flowers, growing both at Capita and Port Macquarie (Lake Innes), but I must own that they are excelled in beauty and variety of colouring by the Cape (of Good Hope, i.e. South African) bulbs, many of which we have seen growing at the Lake (Innes)... On Monday 9th October, we had a most enchanting ride to the Nymph's Grotto, which is at the other side of the farm (otherwise Glendarnel). We left our horses at a cottage near the rocks and walked to them...I must confess (comparing the site with her favourite mountain creek at Glen Alice, Capita), we had no place equal to the Nymph's Grotto...To these rocks I hope we shall often go. It will take many visits to discover all their beauties. It is said that many years ago a gang of bushrangers used to retreat to these rocks, where they found safety and shelter..."

Sidman's account of Brownlow Hill states that in the 1850s 'the property was leased for pig raising - when much damage was done to the beautiful growth surrounding.

==== Downes family management ====
When George and Barbara Macleay returned to England in 1859, the property was leased by Jeremiah Downes. Brownlow Hill was sold to Severin K Salting in 1862 and again leased to Downes who purchased the property from Salting in 1875. In the intervening period it was managed as a series of tenant farms, a practice also adopted by the Macarthur family on the part of their nearby Camden Park Estate known as Cawdor Farms. Martens sketched "the well-established garden at Brownlow Hill in 1871 and species depicted then are still clearly recognisable in the garden. The Martens sketch also shows, some 30 odd years after his initial rendition of the place, the relationship between the homestead with the river flats below and the juxtaposition of the gardened hill top with the lightly vegetated distant hills.

The property, which was inherited by Jeremiah's son Frederick Downes in 1887, and also sketched by architect, writer and promoter of colonial heritage, William Hardy Wilson, is still owned by the Downes family and managed as a dairy.

The Round House was known as Monk's Cottage by c.1900, having been home to one or two generations of tenant dairy farmers, who also gave their name to Monks Lane, which runs north from Burragorang Road, Mount Hunter.

Hardy Wilson sketched the Round House and overshadowed by a large Angophora tree for the plate "Great Apple-Oak at Cobbitty" for his book, "The Cowpasture Road" (1920). In the text he noted that the angophora had recently fallen. Its stump was evident to c.1960.

Glendon, another 19th century dwelling, is situated at the north of the property. When John Fairfax wrote his account of the early properties around Sydney, he remarked that Brownlow Hill was "as beautiful now as it was then" and that J.B. Martin (fl.1831 -1908) reminisced that Mr Macleay was the `best man in the district for mixed farming and dairying and Brownlow Hill was used as a 'receiving place for the wool and fat stock from the large Murrumbidgee stations.'

Trevor Allen, James Broadbent and Howard Tanner mapped the garden c.1969 as part of their joint architectural thesis at the University of Sydney. This thesis was on colonial gardens.

There are four dairies on the property. Aerial photography from 1947 and 1969 clearly indicates a pattern of farming on the property which is almost identical today - the western portion of the property used for grazing only and the alluvial flats for cropping. It is likely that the agricultural use of the land has remained relatively unchanged since the 19th century. One change from the 1960s has been the establishment of a quarry on the western extremity on the property, although this has had little impact on the working farm.

The Round House was known as Monk's Cottage by c. 1900, having been home to one or two generations of tenant dairy farmers, who also gave their name to Monks Lane, north of Burragorang Road, Mount Hunter. Diana Wilson (nee Downes) was born on Brownlow Hill at Glendon, married and left the farm before returning to Monk's Cottage in 1960. When her familoy originally came there, the house was in ruinous condition, having been flooded on numerous occasions. The collapsed central chimney (the surviving roof battens indicate it was octagonal) and dividing wall was taken out to make its original two small rooms into a sitting room. A room was added to connect the Round House and a separate block of c.1900 and both buildings re-roofed, re-sashed and the verandah largely built by Diana's husband, Mackellar Wilson, using windows and doors made by Reg Vincent Windows, Parramatta. Limewash was stripped off the brick external walls. Diana Wilson's husband Mackellar Wilson was the nephew of architect/artist, William Hardy Wilson.

To the north was an orchard on a square plan (only a persimmon tree survives) bounded by funeral cypresses (Cupressus funebris), a species associated with Sir William Macarthur's nearby Camden Park nursery and the settings of Camden Park, St John's Church, Camden and Harrington Park. The garden surrounding the Round House contains old pepper trees (Schinus molle (estimated to date from the 1850s), sky flower (Duranta plumieri), wisteria and honey locusts (Gleditsia triacanthos). Diana Wilson re-established the garden with Cumberland Plain staples such as white cedars (Melia azederach var.australasica), oleanders (Nerium oleander) propagated by Mackellar Wilson), pomegranate (Punica granatum), citrus, mulberry (Morus sp.), orchid tree (Bauhinia x variegata), Chinese elms (Ulmus parvifolia), crepe myrtle (Lagerstroemia indica), jacaranda and roses. Diana and Mackellar planted a jacaranda (J.mimosifolia), given to Aunt Row as a fifth birthday present.

Diana Wilson died in 2009. Her granddaughter Amy and her husband Wes moved into Monk's Cottage. Amy recalls her grandmother and husband installed an internal bathroom, verandah and concrete floor to the Round House, building a beautiful shed. Amy's father recalls bathing in the adjoining creek prior to the bathroom.

John Downes (1916-2008) was born in Glendon, on the Brownlow Hill property, to Edgar & Isabel Downes. He was the fourth generation of Downes family to live on Brownlow Hill since Jeremiah Downes came to manage it in 1858. Schooled at the King's School in Parramatta, he loved horses and first competed in the under-eight riding event at the Camden Show. Eventually he joined the Cobbitty Polo Club and his ability led to him being on that winning team in Manila. He joined the 1st Australian Tank Battalion in World War 1 and met his future wife, Joan Whitton, at a dance for officers in Melbourne (they married in 1952). Sent to New Guinea he served under Samuel Hordern, whose outstanding leadership, both in wartime and in peace, had a profound effect.

From that time, Downes devoted much of his life to community service. A member of the Camden Show Society since 1938, he worked for the Society for 48 years, following the family's interest in cattle and horses. Downes joined the council of the Royal Agricultural Society of NSW in 1952 and became vice-president in 1969. He worked on eight committees and introduced the animal nursery to the Royal Easter Show. He was a member of Wollondilly Shire Council from 1959–71, including terms as deputy president. Passionate about the need to record and study long-term rainfall patterns, he continued the family tradition of collecting rainfall measurements for the Bureau of Meteorology. The family has not missed filling out a monthly report since May 1882. John is survived by Joan, daughter Eleanor, son Edgar and six grandchildren.

Diana Wilson of the Round House/Monk's Cottage, died in 2009 and her granddaughter and family are undertaking minor works to modify the cottage for them to live in (pers.comm., Edgar Downes, 1/2010). A kitchen was installed (Diana still used an old wood stove, a sink and a dresser). Some electrical work, a new water tank, a new slow-combustion wood fire, repairs to the chook run and painting inside the house were undertaken. A family wedding was a major motivation for improving the house and property. Amy's sister asked to be married on the property, so these works were done, the timber verandah was improved, the very old shed in the garden was re-stumped to make it stand up straight again. A wedding marquee was placed in what was a dirt pony paddock, fences being removed and the paddock turfed. The driveway was also improved, along with much gardening work.

A recent book on Caroline Thomas notes her daughter married into the Downes family and moved from Wivenhoe, Cobbitty to Brownlow Hill.

== Description ==
Landscape

Brownlow Hill has an exceptionally attractive semi natural landscape and the setting of the house is one of Australia's best surviving examples of a colonial garden. Brownlow Hill not only includes the house & garden but also the surrounding landscape. The fine brick built stables, aviary and the sandstone pond balustrade/ causeway are found within this area.

The house at Brownlow Hill consists of rendered brick walls and a corrugated iron roof - originally shingle. Floors are hardwood whereas the verandah and entrance hall is sandstone-flagged. The flagging in the entrance is on the diagonal. The cedar joinery is in good condition as are the six paneled doors. Living room, dining room and main bedroom have unusual French door /windows with square glass panes extending to base. The Hall is wide and paved with sandstone, with two symmetrically placed mouldings supporting an archway. Three Georgian marble fireplaces remain within the house. The verandah is supported by "Hardwood Feature" columns.

Grounds at Brownlow Hill

The setting of the house is one of Australia's best surviving examples of a colonial garden which includes not only the house garden but also the surrounding landscape. Within this area are numerous outstanding architectural features such as the fine brick-built stables, aviary and balustraded sandstone pond wall/causeway. Previous owners: Alex. Macleay Sir George Macleay - 1858 J. Downes - 1875

The house and flower garden occupy an artificially formed triangular plateau on the top of a small hill. The site is approached by a small lane (Brownlow Hill Loop Road) which is a tunnel like space lined with mainly African olive (Olea africana), and long leaved privet trees, but interspersed with specimen trees of Chinese elm (Ulmus chinensis), pepper trees (Schinus molle), white cedar (Melia azederach var. australasica), nettle tree (Celtis sp.) and white poplar trees (Populus alba). Views from the lane into the farm, across the flood plain fields and up the small hills are available along the Loop Road. Remnant hardwood fencing lines the road, of mainly two beam split hardwood farm fencing. Some stumps remain in the driveway hedgerows of earlier avenue plantings of stone pines (Pinus pinea).

The house drive is heralded by the brick and sandstone stables and former orchard/vegetable garden/paddock before the gates are reached. The gates are framed by picket fencing, four pillars and a homestead sign. Immediately within the gates on the left is an artificially formed pond built up with a balustraded sandstone retaining wall, partly covered in dwarf creeping fig (Ficus pumila) and urns on the northern edge to carry the drive which then turns right and climbs the hill, skirts a dense bamboo thicket, then clipped hedges of box and thickets overgrown predominantly with African olives and large leaved privet. The drive culminates in an irregular oval carriage loop to the house, which is filled with Agapanthus, Aloe and Agave species. A collection of mature bunya pines (Araucaria bidwillii), hoop pines (A.cunninghamiana), succulent Agave species and palms occupies this part of the garden, including the rare fat trunked Chilean wine palm, (Jubaea chilensis).

The carriage loop occupies the "base" of the triangle of the plateau, the house in the centre, and "allee" with side-wards views over the flood-plane along the left hand (northern) side continuing In a lesser walk along the other side and the flower garden and aviary occupy the apex

The ground falls sharply from the right and left sides of the triangle (i.e. in an arc from NW to SE). On the latter side irregular sandstone steps lead down to a lower garden now overgrown with privet, olive and bamboo. Two more Chilean wine palms are located at the southern base of the hill, near the orchard/vegetable garden/paddock.

Characteristic Components

The stables/Carriage House is a fine brick building with "Marulan" sandstone lintels; vaguely Palladian (ie tripartite facade with single storied sides, pedimented centre with loft). This is the first indication when approaching Brownlow Hill of the sophistication of its design. Date of construction unknown, probably late 1830s. The carriage house is in good condition.

The urn and balustrade-edged pond is well known from the illustration in W Hardy Wilson's "Old Colonial Architecture". The drive edges the northern side with 1 low solid stone balustrade, now overgrown with dwarf creeping fig, Ficus pumila, surmounted at intervals by urns which appear to be composition rather than natural stone. Further urns once decorated a return to this wall on the eastern side. This has now collapsed. The pond is planted with water lilies.

The drive is well maintained gravel drive bordered by box hedges (uneven and incomplete in parts mainly owing to overgrowth and in need of restoration). Behind these, overgrown thickets of largely self sown African olive (Olea africana) and large leaved privet, but containing along the edges a representative collection of common 19th century shrubbery plants and trees (Chinese elms, winter honeysuckle, geraniums, bay, photinia, dietes), A secondary service drive screened by the olives and privets links the coach house with the house. A large honey locust tree (Gleditsia triacanthos) is along this drive).

The Aviary is probably one of the most notable architectural feature of the flower garden and a rare survival. The Aviary consists of brick built walls with nesting boxes and semi-circular gables with an "oil -de-boeuf" above twin arches (originally infilled with wire) The front gable is surmounted by a platform originally carrying a statue of a reclining figure (probably a copy of 'Dying Gaul). The roof is semi-circular, originally of iron and wire which has since been removed. Remains of wire screens exist.

Garden Layout and Plantings

A large collection of mature trees crowns the hilltop and flanks it on the northern side. These include bunya and hoop pines, Himalayan chir pines (Pinus roxburghii), silky oaks (Grevillea robusta), remnant grey box (Eucalyptus moluccana), kurrajongs (Brachychiton populneum), tree of heaven (Ailanthus altissima), pony-tail palm (Nolina sp.), crepe myrtle (Lagerstroemeria indica) and at the base of the hill to the east, a line of English oak (Quercus robur). Other trees which are naturalising amongst privets and olives are loquats (Eriobotrya japonica) and oleanders. A single specimen of native cypress, possibly Port Jackson/Oyster Bay pine (Callitris rhomboides) is to the north of the carriage loop in the "Victorian" garden.

A range of shrub plantings include the now rare Italian buckthorn (Rhamnus alaternus), Cape plumbago (P.capensis), Agave species, Yucca species, roses, may bush (Spiraea cantonensis), geraniums, Oleanders (Nerium oleander), shrub honeysuckle (Lonicera fragrantissima), Himalayan jasmine (Jasminium mesnyi), laurustinus (Viburnum tinus), Photinia glabra, a bay tree (Laurus nobilis), lantana (L.camara), sky flower (Duranta plumieri), mickey mouse plant (Ochna serrulata) and Cotoneasters.

The flower garden is somewhat altered in the detail of its design (in paths, beds and plant material) however it still retains some of its major features. A large Marulan sandstone urn on stone pedestal still remains as does the sundial - a baluster shaped support with a brass dial bearing the inscription George Macleay 1836.

The Aviary is probably one of the most notable architectural feature of the flower garden and a rare survival. The Aviary consists of brick built walls with nesting boxes and semi-circular gables with an "oil -de-boeuf" above twin arches (originally infilled with wire) The front gable is surmounted by a platform originally carrying a statue of a reclining figure (probably a copy of 'Dying Gaul). The roof is semi-circular, originally of iron and wire which has since been removed. Remains of wire screens exist. Behind the aviary are two specimens of a rare Indian medicinal plant, vasaka, (Adhatoda duvernaia/A.vasica), thought to have been introduced from India by Alexander Macleay through his correspondence with a Dr Walloch, head of the (then 1820s-30s) Calcutta Botanic Gardens.

To the north of the dam/pond is an area of palms, pines and a mature pecan nut tree, including Canary Island date palm (Phoenix canariensis), cotton palm (Washingtonia robusta), clumping date palm (Phoenix reclinata), a Queensland kauri (Agathis robusta), Chilean wine palm (Jubaea chilensis), carob (Ceratonia siliqua), crepe myrtle (Lagerstroemia indica), tree of heaven, Chinese elm, Juniperus sp., Nettle trees, Norway maple (Acer platanoides), English elms (Ulmus procera), Chir pine (Pinus roxburghii), honey flower (Melianthus major) and white poplar (Populus alba).

Common ground cover plants include Dietes iridiodes, Nile lily (Agapanthus orientalis), Crassula sp., Kaffir lily (Clivea miniata), spider plant (Chlorophytum comosum), Agave & Aloe species, Cape plumbago (P.capensis). Cat's claw creeper (Doxantha unguis-cati) is a major ground cover and weed, also climbing the trunks of some major trees, and covering much of the eastern banks of the hill on which the house and garden stands.

Today there are four dairies on the property. Aerial photography from 1947 and 1969 clearly indicates a pattern of farming on the property which is almost identical today - the western portion of the property used for grazing only and the alluvial flats for cropping.

Several quarries exist on the property, for sandstone and shale supplies.

Detailed garden plant list (not comprehensive):

- Celtis australis, southern nettle tree, naturalized along creeks, drives, on hill around house
- Platanus x acerifolia, plane, specimens dotted along main BLH Loop Road
- Olea europaea var.cuspidata (Africana) and on hills
- Araucaria cunninghamii, naturalized over main house hill top / slope to its north, and SW of house
- Eucalyptus tereticornis, forest red gum, native bush on hills/scattered paddock trees; also S of house
- Brachychiton populneus, kurrajong, SE & SW of house on hill
- Pinus roxburghii, chir pine
- Ulmus parvifolia, lower drive around pond; large old tree S of house also
- Ficus pumila var.pumila, on s/stone wall
- Phyllostachys nigra, at base of drive where starts ascending to house
- Doxantha unguis-cati, cat's claw creeper, all over the hill/up trees
- Chlorophytum comosum, spider plant, ground cover N of house
- Aloe sp. (tree form) N of house, (A.excelsa?)
- Furcraea selloa, Mauritius hemp
- F.s.'Aureo-Variegata', variegated
- Aspidistra elatior, cast iron plant, pot NE of house, also under chir pine to NE
- Agapanthus orientalis, Nile/African lily, N of house
- Araucaria bidwillii, Bunya pine, S of house
- Adhatoda vasica, vasika/Malabar nut, S of house
- Aloe ciliaris, climbing aloe, on bird cage
- Clivia miniata, Kaffir lily, ground cover S of house
- Jacaranda mimosifolia, near well S of house
- Rosa hybrids/cultivars, S of house
- Selenicereus grandiflorus, queen of the night (climbing cactus), up hoop pine SW of house
- Tecomaria capensis, hedge SW of house, clipped "boxes" on N verandah also
- Platycerium superbum, staghorn fern
- Acanthus mollis, bear's breetches, bush track S of house (to stable)
- Gleditsia triacanthos, seeding along BLH Loop road between stables and main entry gate
- Hoop pines
- African olives
- Celtis australis
- Ligustrum ovalifolium, long-leaved privet, naturalized on hill/along drives
- Plumbago capensis, on hill (satin bower bird nest amongst some, shown by Joan Downes)
- Buxus macrophylla hedging along main drive once it climbs the hill to the house
- Iris germanica cv.s, flag iris, S of house
- Jasminium nitidum, on verandah column
- Hippeastrum hybrids/cv.s, S of house
- Cheirianthus cheiri cv.s, wallflowers, S of house
- Camellia japonica cv.?/Rothmannia globosa, tree gardenia (too far off to tell - SW corner of house
- Plumbago capensis, Cape plumbago, low hedge E of front door
- Macrozamia communis, burrawang (cycad), N of house in carriage loop
- Nerium oleander cv., oleander, SW of house near drive (6-8m tall)
- Alyxia buxifolia, sea box
- evergreen oak (sent 1832 RBG - G.Macleay) -survives?
- 1849 Annabella Boswell noted Crinums, pentstemons, Cape bulbs, Euphorbia, peaches, plums, figs
- Camden Park nursery (1850s) supplied the following (it is unclear if any survive)
- Magnolia grandiflora, evergreen /southern magnolia/bull bay (ex Camden Park)
- M.denudata, Yulan
- Bambusa nigra, black bamboo (I suspect that name is now Phyllostachys nigra)
- Camellias
- hoop pines
- Bunya pines
- funeral cypresses & Norfolk Island hibiscus

An 1836 record of A.Macleay's garden at Brownlow Hill noted he had oranges, apples, loquants, pears, plums, cherries, figs, mulberries, medlars, raspberries, strawberries, gooseberries It is unclear whether there are any survivors.

There is a plume poppy (Macleaya cordata, named for Alexander Macleay) which was a donation by James Broadbent some years ago and a very old red "geranium" (Pelargonium) which Mrs Downes thinks was a survivor of the Macleay garden.

Glendon

North and west of the small hillock on which lies Brownlow Hill house, is Glendon, another 19th century dwelling, near the northern boundary of the property, and on a higher hill with extensive views north, east and south over the property.

The Round House

In the southern part of the property, near the Mount Hunter rivulet, is an octagonal brick cottage known as the "roundhouse", which now has been adapted and extended as a home. This was sketched by W Hardy Wilson in "The Cow Pasture Road", beside a giant Angophora tree (which even then c.1920, had fallen down). This lies on land originally granted (2000 acres) to Peter Murdock, and now part of Brownlow Hill. The place was known locally as Glendaruel or Glendaurel, and is believed to have been associated with the Government station established by Macquarie in 1815. Similar forms were known in a gatehouse at Winbourne and a residence in Molong (both now demolished), making this a rare early structure of its type.

The Round House was known as Monk's Cottage by c.1900, having been home to one or two generations of tenant dairy farmers, who also gave their name to Monks Lane, which runs north from Burragorang Road, Mount Hunter. The Round House has been home to Diana Wilson (sister of John Downes of Brownlow Hill) her husband Mackellar Wilson (nephew of Hardy Wilson) and their family since 1960. When the Wilsons came to the Round House it was in ruinous condition, having been flooded on a number of occasions. The collapsed central chimney (the surviving roof battens indicate that it was octagonal) and dividing wall was taken out to make its original two small rooms into a sitting room. A room was added to connect the Round House and a separate block of c. 1900 and the buildings reroofed, resashed and the veranda largely rebuilt by Mackellar Wilson using windows and doors made by Reg Vincent of Vincent Windows, Parramatta. Limewash has been stripped from the unrendered walls.

To the north was an orchard on a square plan (only a persimmon tree survives) bounded by funeral cypresses (Cupressus funebris), a species associated with Sir William Macarthur's Camden Park nursery and the settings of Camden Park, St John's Church, Camden and Harrington Park. The garden surrounding the Round House contains old pepper trees (Schinus), sky flower (Duranta plumieri), wisteria and honey locusts (Gleditsia triacanthos). Diana Wilson has re-established it with Cumberland Plain staples such as white cedars, oleanders (propagated by Mac Wilson), pomegranate, citrus, mulberry, Bauhinia, Chinese elms, crepe myrtle, jacaranda and roses.

About 100 metres south of the Round House is a quarry in the Flaggy Creek bed, a tributary of the Mount Hunter Rivulet. The quarry was a source of Wiannamatta stone (advertised in the press of the 1820s - '30s as Cowpastures stone), a highly-figured mudstone used for paving (i.e. flagstones) at Brownlow Hill (the console table base, veranda and entrance hall flagging) and Elizabeth Bay House (the entrance hall and flagging, saloon stair and upper floor chimneypieces). The Camden Park portico columns are reputedly from this quarry. The quarry provides a rare instance of a surviving connection between early houses and the source of their materials and is an important archaeological site.

General

An elaborate garden design which appears to be strongly influenced by 1830s designs in England and perhaps in particular by the ideas of John Claudius Loudon (viz the variety of features (the use of composition is significant) juxtaposed within a relatively small space and the combining of the irregularity of a landscape garden with the smallness in scale of a "villa" garden and the formality of individual parts - a preoccupation with specific features in favour of their subjection to a general effect)

More specifically the garden shows remarkable parallels in its detailing to that of the well known English horticulturist, Louisa Lawrence. The details of the sundial in parterre, the urn, and the use of casts (the Dying Gaul) surmounted Mrs Lawrence's (gabled) camellia hose. There are no similarities in the plan.

The "Lawrencian Villa" as it was known was fully described and illustrated in London's " Suburban Garden and Villa Companion" in 1838. If one takes the date of the sundial as indicative of the date of the general embellishment of the garden it predates this publication. The specific influence is unproved, the generic influence is strikingly apparent. The general layout is well maintained but individual items and some overgrown areas need attention. The aviary is in urgent need of restoration.

=== Condition ===
As at 6 August 2001, the site has high archaeological potential. Much of the colonial landscape and garden is still evident. Sub-surface remnants of previous agricultural structures and/or associated artefacts may still be within the boundaries of the original allotments.

Flaggy Creek Quarry site

About 100 metres south of the Round House is a quarry in the Flaggy Creek bed, a tributary of the Mount Hunter Rivulet. The quarry was a source of Wiannamatta stone (advertised in the press of the 1820s - '30s as Cowpastures stone), a highly-figured mudstone used for paving (i.e. flagstones) at Brownlow Hill (the console table base, veranda and entrance hall flagging) and Elizabeth Bay House (the entrance hall and flagging, saloon stair and upper floor chimneypieces). The Camden Park portico columns are reputedly from this quarry. The quarry provides a rare instance of a surviving connection between early houses and the source of their materials and is an important archaeological site.

Brownlow Hill has remained relatively unchanged since the 19th century, considering the constant pattern of farming, the scenic landscape setting and most of the Brownlow Hill estate and contents has remained largely intact.

=== Modifications and dates ===
House Modification

The house at Brownlow Hill was originally built as two small separate wings of brick at right angles to one another, with a separate kitchen at the rear making up the third side of the Courtyard. By 1834 alterations were made transforming the house which was "now pronounced the best in the Colony." The two small wings were joined, forming an L-shaped building. The original roof endings are still to be seen beneath the present roof. Within the angles another section was then added to the east wing, On the right of the north elevation is a wing which was added by Jeremiah Downes, who bought the property In 1875. At that time the front door was replaced and a small portico built before it. A cellar is approached from the rear. In the 1890s a portico-ed entry way to the front door, and new Victorian front door, was added, along with a new wing to the west of the original house. John & Joan Downes made significant modifications in c.1961, installing two internal bathrooms in the eastern wing, a corridor connecting the entry hall with the eastern wing rooms leading to a relocated entry door, moved to be centrally placed on the eastern wing. An internal kitchen was also provided within the central wing of the house, including the removal of an internal wall between a former bedroom and scullery.

A suite of works was undertaken to the main homestead in 2016-17.

Round House/Monk's House

- 1960+ modifications (see history)
- 2009+ modifications (see history).

Landscape Modifications

- In the 1850s the property was leased for pig raising when much damage was done to the surrounding growth. In 1859, the property was leased by Jeremiah Downes. Brownlow Hill was sold to Severin K Salting and in 1862 was again leased to Downes who purchased the property from Salting in 1875. In the intervening period it was managed as a series of tenant farms
- In the 1960s, a quarry was established on the western extremity on the property with minimal impact on the working farm.

=== Further information ===
The general layout is well maintained but individual items and some overgrown areas need attention. The aviary is in urgent need of restoration. The outer garden, lane/ Loop Road and hedgerows are in need of some weed management, to retain significant views and vistas, and control spread, particularly of African olives and privet. The olives in particular are invasive as scrub elsewhere on the farm, although this is under management. The pond/dam wall is in need of repair and some reconstruction, to prevent further cracking and slumping.

== Heritage listing ==
As at 6 August 2001, Brownlow Hill is a rare, substantially intact colonial farming estate with an outstanding scenic landscape setting with many rare surviving early colonial structures and features. It has one of the most prominent colonial gardens and estates in Australia with the extent of its considerable acreage and pattern of farming largely intact. Brownlow Hill contains a designed landscape of national importance and renown which includes ground modeling, layout and plantings from the pre-1860s. The homestead layout and farm was established by Alexander Macleay, first Colonial Secretary of NSW and his sons George and to a lesser extent James Macleay. The site has association with government stations initiated by Macquarie. Brownlow Hill has had continuous family occupation (the Downes family) since 1859 and ownership since 1875. The site is considerably intact with a network of 19th century dwellings of a successful farm which are still in operation. Brownlow Hill is firmly placed in the consciousness of the community as one of the most evocative early European estates (colonial house, garden, landscape setting) in NSW. It has been romanticized by the well known architect, author, artist and gardener, W. Hardy Wilson (1881 - 1955).

A remarkable survival of a sophisticated colonial garden of the 1830s owned by, and probably designed by, a family notable both in colonial politics and society and internationally in the field of horticulture.

Brownlow Hill Estate was listed on the New South Wales State Heritage Register on 25 January 2001 having satisfied the following criteria.

The place is important in demonstrating the course, or pattern, of cultural or natural history in New South Wales.

The site has historical significance for the agricultural work which was undertaken within the region. The establishment of an ornamental colonial garden within a rural setting were amongst the earliest of its kind and the diversity of imported plants were unusual for the period. Aerial photography from 1947 and 1969 clearly indicates a pattern of farming on the property which is almost identical today -the western portion of the property used for grazing only and the alluvial flats for cropping. The continuity of the Downes family's occupation at Brownlow Hill enables an insight into one family's evolution evidenced by existing fabric and landscape.

The place is important in demonstrating aesthetic characteristics and/or a high degree of creative or technical achievement in New South Wales.

The site has aesthetic significance as an important remnant of early agricultural attempts in the district that still functions as a farm with its pattern of land use intact, and an intact example of the sophistocated and conscious landscape design of an early rural estate on the Cumberland Plain. It also has rare surviving and intact colonial estate layout, features, farm plantings, ornamental gardens and structures which provide an important visual context for the former landscape, allowing opportunities for cultural and historical interpretation.

The place has a strong or special association with a particular community or cultural group in New South Wales for social, cultural or spiritual reasons.

The Homestead along with the adjoining land is of high social significance as one of very few sites of its type established in the region. It is of particular value for its prominent colonial gardens, and estates with considerable acreage and pattern of farming largely intact.

The place has potential to yield information that will contribute to an understanding of the cultural or natural history of New South Wales.

The site has technical/research significance through its association with early agricultural and pastoral activities. The site allows investigation into Colonial farming practices, landscape design and ornamental gardens.

The place possesses uncommon, rare or endangered aspects of the cultural or natural history of New South Wales.

Brownlow Hill is a rare, substantially intact colonial farming estate with surviving layout, structures and features.

The place is important in demonstrating the principal characteristics of a class of cultural or natural places/environments in New South Wales.

The site is representative of the early attempts to develop agriculture. Brownlow Hill is also representative of Colonial landscape design.
