= Grasmere, New South Wales =

Grasmere
- Suburb
- Interactive map of Grasmere
- Country: Australia
- State: New South Wales
- Region: Macarthur
- City: Sydney
- LGA: Camden Council
- Location: 74 km (46 mi) from Sydney CBD

Government
  - State electorate: Camden
  - Federal division: Hume
- Elevation: 92 m (302 ft)

Population
  - Total: 2,105 (2021 census)
- Postcode: 2570
Suburbs around Grasmere
Brownlow Hill	Ellis Lane	Cobbitty
Brownlow Hill	Grasmere	Camden
Mount Hunter	Bickley Vale	Cawdor

Grasmere is a suburb of the Macarthur Region of Sydney in the state of New South Wales, Australia in Camden Council.

== History ==
The area now known as Grasmere was originally home to the Gandangara people of the Southern Highlands although the Muringong, southernmost of the Darug people, were also known to inhabit the area. In 1805, wool pioneer John Macarthur was granted 5,000 acres (20 km^{2}) at Cowpastures (now Camden). Grasmere is still primarily a rural locality.

== Demographics ==
In the 2021 census, the suburb of Grasmere had a population of 2,105 people. The median age of residents was 59 and 43.5% of people were aged 65 or over. The majority of people were born in Australia and the most common ancestries were English, Australian and Irish. The top responses for religious affiliation were Catholic 39.2% and Anglican 26.4%. The median household weekly income of $1,652 was lower than the national median of $1,746.

== Politics ==
Grasmere lies in the south ward of Camden Council, currently represented by Cr Eva Campbell, Cr Damien Quinnell and Cr Rose Sicari. It sits within the state electorate of Camden, represented by Labor's Sally Quinnell, the former school music teacher, and the federal electorate of Hume, represented by Liberal's Angus Taylor, the former businessman.
