= Belimbla Park, New South Wales =

Belimbla Park
- Town
- Coordinates: 34°04′30″S 150°32′53″E
- Country: Australia
- State: New South Wales
- Region: Macarthur
- LGA: Wollondilly Shire
- Location: 85 km (53 mi) WSW of Sydney CBD; 57 km (35 mi) N of Mittagong

Government
  - State electorate: Wollondilly
  - Federal division: Hume
- Elevation: 365 m (1,198 ft)

Population
  - Total: 581 (2016 census)
- Postcode: 2570
Localities around Belimbla Park
| Blue Mountains National Park | Blue Mountains National Park | Orangeville |
| Oakdale | Belimbla Park | The Oaks |
| Oakdale | Lakesland | Glenmore |

Belimbla Park is a semi-rural estate in the Macarthur Region of New South Wales, Australia, in the Wollondilly Shire. It is located west of The Oaks and east of Oakdale. At the 2016 census, it had a population of 581.

The residents of the estate often have vegetable gardens or small orchards, horses and ponies or other hobby farms.

The estate is the result of a subdivision of an apple orchard, with blocks often between 2-10 acres in size.

On the 26th of October 2024, Belimbla Park was the place where overhead 2 aircraft collided mid-air, killing all 3 occupants of both planes.
