= Brownlow Hill, New South Wales =

Brownlow Hill
- Town
- Coordinates: 34.0348°S 150.6570°E
- Country: Australia
- State: New South Wales
- Region: Macarthur
- LGA: Wollondilly Shire
- Location: 77 km (48 mi) SW of Sydney CBD

Government
  - State electorate: Camden
  - Federal division: Hume
- Elevation: 95 m (312 ft)

Population
  - Total: 424 (2016 census)
- Postcode: 2570
Localities around Brownlow Hill
Theresa Park	Cobbitty	Cobbitty
Orangeville	Brownlow Hill	Ellis Lane
Glenmore	Mount Hunter	Grasmere

Brownlow Hill is a small village in the Macarthur Region of New South Wales, Australia, in the Wollondilly Shire. It is north-west of the main town of Camden. At the 2016 census, it had a population of 424.

== Heritage listings ==
Orangeville has a number of heritage-listed sites, including:

- Brownlow Hill Loop Road, Brownlow Hill: Brownlow Hill Estate
