= Ellis Lane =

- Suburb
- Interactive map of Ellis Lane
- Country: Australia
- State: New South Wales
- Region: Macarthur
- City: Sydney
- LGA: Camden Council
- Location: 76 km (47 mi) SW of Sydney CBD

Government
  - State electorate: Camden
  - Federal division: Hume
- Elevation: 83 m (272 ft)

Population
  - Total: 852 (2021 census)
- Postcode: 2570
Suburbs around Ellis Lane
Cobbitty	Cobbitty	Cobbitty
Brownlow Hill	Ellis Lane	Cobbitty
Grasmere	Grasmere	Camden

Ellis Lane is a suburb of the Macarthur Region of Sydney in the state of New South Wales, Australia in Camden Council.

== History ==
The area now known as Ellis Lane was originally home to the Gandangara people of the Southern Highlands although the Muringong, southernmost of the Darug people, were also known to inhabit the area. In 1805, wool pioneer John Macarthur was granted 5,000 acres (20 km^{2}) at Cowpastures (now Camden). Ellis Lane is still primarily a rural locality.

== Governance ==
Ellis Lane lies in the south ward of Camden Council, currently represented by Chris Patterson (who is also the Mayor of Camden), Eva Campbell and Fred Whiteman. It sits within the state electorate of Camden, represented by Labor's Sally Quinnell, the former Mayor of Camden, and the federal electorate of Macarthur, represented by Labor's Mike Freelander.

Centennial Lane is a street off Ellis Lane and is a part of the Ellis Lane Suburb

== Population ==
At the 2021 census, there were 852 residents in Ellis Lane. The most common ancestries in Ellis Lane were English 38.5%, Australian 36.9%, Italian 11.4%, Irish 10.3% and Scottish 8.5%. The top responses for religious affiliation were Catholic 39.8%, Anglican 21.4%, No Religion 17.4%, Not stated 4.5% and Christian, nfd 3.4%. Secondary Education (5.7%) was the major industry of employment and other major industries included Road Freight Transport (5.2%), Primary Education (3.1%), Carpentry Services (2.9%) and House Construction (2.6%). The median household weekly income was $2,269, somewhat higher than the national median of $1,746. In Ellis Lane, 100% of the dwellings were separate houses.
