= The Oaks, New South Wales =

Coordinates: 34°04′36″S 150°34′16″E

The Oaks
- Town
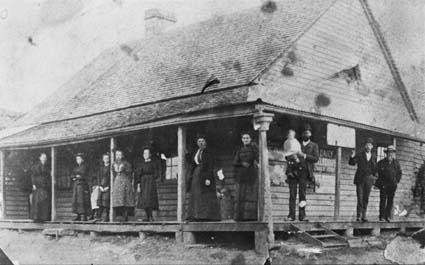
- The Oaks Post Office in 1890
- Country: Australia
- State: New South Wales
- LGA: Wollondilly Shire
- Location: 82 km (51 mi) WSW of Sydney; 53 km (33 mi) N of Mittagong
- Established: 1820s

Government
  - State electorate: Wollondilly
  - Federal division: Hume
- Elevation: 290 m (950 ft)

Population
  - Total: 2,525 (2016 census)
- Postcode: 2570
Localities around The Oaks
Blue Mountains National Park	Orangeville	Theresa Park
Belimbla Park	The Oaks	Glenmore
Mowbray Park	Mowbray Park	Picton

The Oaks is a town in the Macarthur Region of New South Wales, Australia in Wollondilly Shire on the south western edge of the Sydney Basin. The Oaks is located 82 kilometres (51 mi) south-west of Sydney via the Hume Highway, 13 kilometres (8 mi) west of Camden and 290m above sea-level. At the 2016 census, The Oaks and the surrounding area had a population of 2,525.

Despite a long-standing economic dependence upon coal mining and despite the urban development inspired by its proximity to Sydney, The Oaks has essentially remained an attractive semi-rural district.

== Pre European history ==
The area was once part of the traditional land of the Tharawal people prior to colonisation, whose territory stretched from Botany Bay in Sydney down to Jervis Bay on the south coast, and into Burragorang in the ranges. The area was fiercely contested between the Tharawal and the Europeans, particularly between 1812 and 1816, culminating in a massacre at Cataract Gorge. A group of the Gandangara people near Appin were caught by Macquarie's troops while they were sleeping. At least fourteen Aboriginal men, women and children were killed. On Macquarie's orders, the bodies of two of the men were hung in trees as a warning to others.

Introduction of European diseases had a great effect on the Aborigines of the area. The Tharawal and the Gandangara eventually moved into the area around The Oaks. Members of both tribes ended up working for the Europeans in the 1920s when they were placed on reserves and their children forcibly removed until the practice ceased in the 1960s.

== Post European history ==
The Oaks was called simply "Oaks" until 1895. An expedition was undertaken in 1795 which included Governor Hunter and George Bass, due to the sighting of some cows which had strayed from the Government Farm at Farm Cove. The herd had increased from 8 to around 40 and the area they were found in was then named "Cow Pasture Plains". Until 1822, it was forbidden to settle in the region although it was noted as being an excellent area for cultivation as a succession of governors sought to protect the herd from exploitation or molestation as an investment in the colony's future. John Warby was appointed Superintendent of Wild Cattle at the Cowpastures in 1803 and by 1806 was also a Constable in the district; acted as a guide on a number of exploring parties and expeditions. Warby was the first to explore the Oaks region. A botanist by the name George Caley explored the area between 1802 and 1804. He penned the name "The Oaks" due to the predominance of She-oaks in the area.

In 1815 Governor Macquarie established cattle yards at "The Oaks", Cawdor (halfway between Camden and Picton), and Brownlow Hill and later at Stonequarry Creek (Picton) to which wild cattle were taken to be reclaimed for the government herds. On 7 July 1822, the Oaks station was relinquished to Major Henry Colden Antill. Many of the cattle were later moved to Bathurst. The stations were closed in 1826.

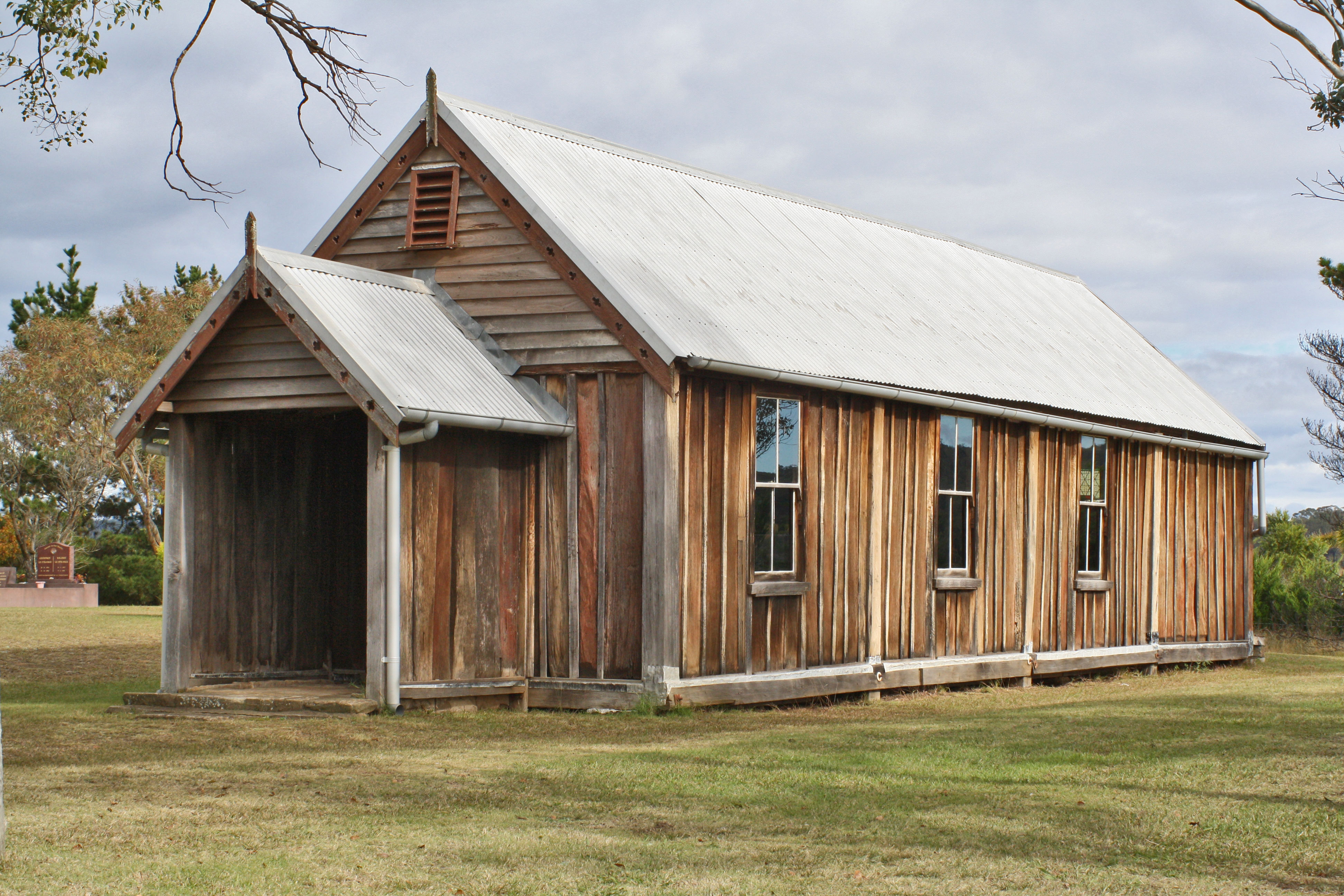
St Matthew's Church, a timber slab structure.

The district was surveyed between 1822 and 1827 as land grants were extended to the area. The first was issued in 1823 to John Wild a former Lieutenant and Adjutant of the 48th Regiment, who had been the superintendent of Government Stock on the cattle station at Cawdor and T.C. Harrington. Wild established a farm on the "Vanderville"' estate and built a homestead in the late 1820s with the help of Aboriginal and convict labour. Wild primarily raised cattle but he also ran sheep and pigs, grew wheat and tobacco, and established a dairy.

In October 1822 William Fisher was acting Constable at "The Oaks". On 7 October he was recommended for position of Chief Constable and Poundkeeper at Cawdor. On 7 August 1823, he was dismissed from this position, but later took up the position of District Constable, County of Argyle in August 1824.

St. Mathews Anglican Church c.1838/39, was built at The Oaks by the families of John Wild of Vanderville and Major Russell of Orthez for their servants and families, it is constructed of local timber. The church still stands today, but has been renovated twice to preserve it. The church cemetery contains the headstone of Henry Kable Jr, son of Henry Kable and other caskets which were removed from Burragorang Valley before it was flooded for the building of Warragamba Dam.

== Farming ==
Pastoralists from Camden, Campbelltown and The Oaks began running their cattle in the Burragorang Valley, explored by Francis Barrallier in 1802-03 when Governor King asked him to find a way through the Blue Mountains. It was most likely that the pastoralists drove their cattle along what is now called Burragorang Road. This road runs from The Oaks to the Burragorang Valley and was surveyed in 1827 by Robert Dixon. It was merely a basic bullock-dray track until the traffic generated by the silver mines required an improved surface.

Labour shortages became an issue when convict transportation to New South Wales ceased in 1840 and convicts received their ticket of leave, Free settlers with large holdings sold or let portions of their land to emancipists as they did not have or could not afford a large enough workforce to work their land. The economic focus then shifted from mixed farming to wheat from the 1840s and a wheat mill was established in the area. The 1850s became a period of economic expansion for the area. Early in the 1860s, wheat rust devastated the wheat industry. The farmers moved their focus to market gardening, dairy farming, hay production and the building of hay presses. Oranges and milk became staple products.

== Mining ==
George Caley re-traced Barrallier's route into the Burragorang Valley in 1806. Caley also failed to cross the Blue Mountains; however, he did find coal in the valley and discovered Thirlmere Lakes. The discovery of Galena by Billy Russell and Billy George opened a relatively brief phase of development activity at Yerranderie. The exploitation of Lead and Silver drew attention to the area in 1890, but it was only when John Vigar Bartlett began to produce payable ore in 1898 that real expansion of the silver field occurred. 1891 was the beginning of mining for iron ore, in the area between The Oaks and Picton. After economic growth in the 1920s the depression hit the community hard and people began to move away. Coal mining and timber getting were also carried out in the Burragorang Valley at Nattai on a small scale in the 1930s but it soon became the principal economic activity and, after World War II, led to a resurgence of the township although massive retrenchments from the local mines occurred in the early 1980s.

== Vanderville ==
The widow of John Benton Wild, Emmeline Wild, donated 100 acres (0.40 km^{2}) of "Vanderville" for the establishment of a village in 1858. This area was located on the banks of Werriberri Creek (a Tharawal name for the song of the willie wagtail). Flooding caused the settlement to move to higher ground. When a post office was opened later in 1858 the village was officially recognised as "The Oaks". Lots were advertised for sale in Sydney and by 1860 there were some 8 houses, 2 blacksmith shops, a wine saloon, school and the hotel in the village. The Oaks Hotel was in operation by 1863 and closed approximately 100 years later. It then became a sanatorium for people suffering Tuberculosis. It was thought that the relative high altitude was conducive to the health of the patients. The original Church of England, St. Mathews, was now too far from the village and so St. Luke's was built in 1892 on a town allotment to service the new village.
