= Orangeville, New South Wales =

Orangeville
- Town
- Coordinates: 34°01′48″S 150°35′31″E
- Country: Australia
- State: New South Wales
- Region: Macarthur
- LGA: Wollondilly Shire
- Location: 83 km (52 mi) WSW of Sydney CBD; 57 km (35 mi) N of Mittagong

Government
  - State electorate: Wollondilly
  - Federal division: Hume
- Elevation: 315 m (1,033 ft)

Population
  - Total: 1,250 (2016 census)
- Postcode: 2570
Localities around Orangeville
Blue Mountains National Park	Werombi	Cobbity
Blue Mountains National Park	Orangeville	Theresa Park
Belimbla Park	The Oaks	Glenmore

Orangeville is a small town in the Macarthur Region of New South Wales, Australia, in the Wollondilly Shire. It reported a population of 1,250 in the 2016 census.

== Heritage listings ==
Orangeville has a number of heritage-listed sites, including:

- Brownlow Hill Loop Road, Brownlow Hill: Brownlow Hill Estate
