= Camden Post Office =

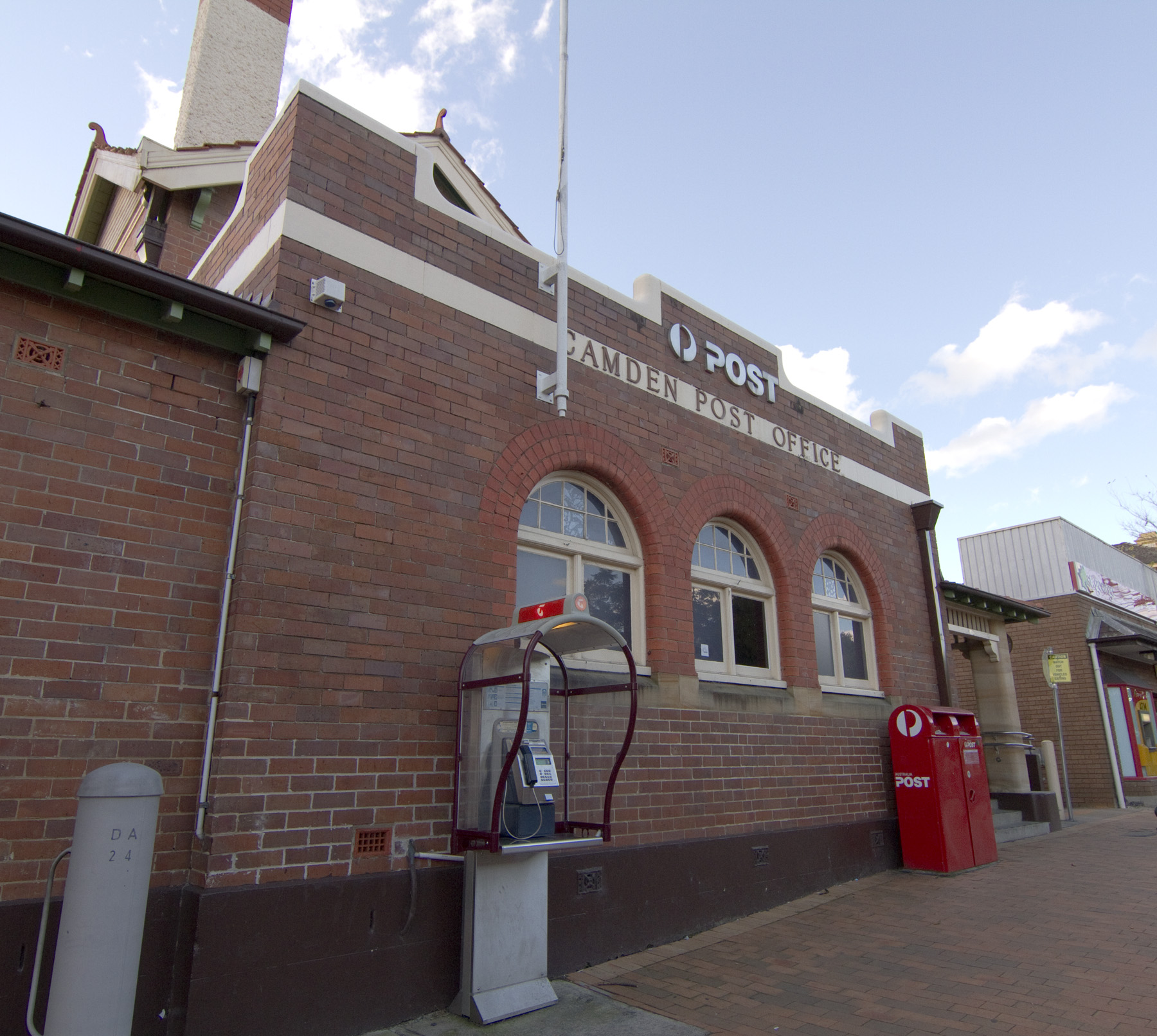
- Camden Post Office in 2013

- Location within New South Wales Location within Sydney
- 34.0545°S 150.6950°E
- Location: 135 Argyle Street, Camden, New South Wales, Australia

Commonwealth Heritage List
- Official name: Camden Post Office
- Type: Listed place (Historic)
- Designated: 22 August 2012
- Reference no.: 106176

Camden Post Office is a heritage-listed post office at 135 Argyle Street, Camden, New South Wales, Australia. It was added to the Australian Commonwealth Heritage List on 22 August 2012.

== History ==
Camden is an historic centre dating from the earliest years of the nineteenth century, and has been associated with some of the earliest developments in the Australian wool, wheat and wine industries, particularly following the original land grant to pioneer John Macarthur in 1805. The first post office in Camden operated from about 1841, being preceded by a postal service of the 1830s, based at Cawdor where mails were exchanged with Sydney three times a week. Mrs Eliza Pearson reputedly operated the 1841 post office, and a record of 1846 showed that daily mail was received from Sydney. A telegraph office was opened in 1877 and in 1878 it was proposed to combine the two offices into a Government-built building. Tenders were called and a post office, on the present site, was completed in 1882. At that time it consisted of an office, four rooms, a servants room and a kitchen. Additional improvements, including a second storey to the residence and a balcony above the public area were approved in 1897.

The date of construction of the current Camden Post Office has been identified as both 1882 and 1898, with elements of the 1882 building remaining in the present building. However, the 1898 works by builder Richard Basden were substantial, and largely engulfed the earlier building. A telephone exchange was also added in 1910.

== Description ==
Camden Post Office is at 135 Argyle Street, Camden, comprising the whole of Lot 15 DP751265.

The original Camden Post Office dates from 1882 in the era of Colonial Architect James Barnet, and this early core was buried beneath Edwardian additions (under the aegis of architect Walter Liberty Vernon), which have been dated at 1898 (the post hall, mail and service rooms, quarters), and 1910 (telephone exchange). However, the original building is still visible from some viewpoints, albeit concealed from Argyle Street by the later addition. The brickwork of the rear single-storey section is different in colour (darker) to the brickwork on the front two-storey section, and the roof of the rear section is corrugated galvanised steel sheeting.

The original location of the telephone exchange inside the building is not known, but there was a telegram room in the building up until recent decades at the south-west end of the postal hall, and has been incorporated into the latter in recent years. There is no visible evidence that this room had direct access from the exterior of the building. For practical purposes, the earlier fabric can be regarded as a composite of the Barnet and Vernon work. The Barnet fabric can be seen in a stone pier by the front entry, and in areas with freestone window sill treatments. However, Barnet's freestone pier detail has been compromised by the fitting of a disabled ramp and its handrail in recent years.

The post office occupies a prominent site in Argyle Street, the main shopping precinct. It has a broad alleyway to its immediate north-east, with its north-east entry apparently designed to develop a diagonal reading, common in Federation composition. The corner location also gives the entrance more prominence. At the same time the postal hall is composed as a broad frontal mass, symmetrical in the brick breakfront around three arched windows with orange brickwork around the arch openings, and asymmetrical in the total frontage with two flanking wings: one is a porch, the other has a plain-wall with a half-hipped roof similar to that of the porch, but not extending down as far. Both of these flanking wings have terracotta tile roofs. The latter wing has a former window to the front elevation which has been bricked up. The entry porch is anchored with a square sandstone pier, one of the Barnet vestiges, at its northeast corner, and has a slat work timber frieze over its front steps. A panel is fitted across the former opening to a post box porch that formerly was accessed from the entrance porch. A new post box porch has been built along the lane on the northeast side of the building. It has a steel frame and steel deck roofing. Period timber brackets and a frieze have been added to this in an attempt to render it more sympathetic to the style of the earlier buildings. A pair of automatic glazed sliding doors lead from the entrance porch to the postal hall.

The building and its quarters are elevated on a plinth structure, which appears to be in cement rendered brick, later painted a dark colour. The plinths retain their original sub-floor vents. An illuminated standard sign has been placed outside the entry porch, bearing the Australia Post logo.

The postal hall breakfront wing is in exposed face brick with three stilted arched windows. These are divided into two plain-paned hinged casements in the lower parts and fixed multi-pane lunettes in the upper. The postal hall wing has a flat roof concealed behind a parapet. The original door that accessed this balcony has been replaced by a new panel door. A rendered string-course bearing the building's name extends across the street-facing elevation. Above that is a parapet in the same face brick with a cement render capping rising and falling over three raised bays. The current Australia Post retail logo has been applied to the centre of these parapet bays. Timber-framed public phone booths were probably added to the left front in the early twentieth century, and were later replaced with standard PMG aluminium-clad type. A telephone booth and post box are in now front of the breakfront.

The quarters behind is an asymmetrical two-storeyed house with a projecting breakfront set on the southwest end, a terracotta tiled roof in the Marseilles pattern, horn finials, simple gabled roof endings, and a brick chimney with textured stucco and face brick capping. The windows are related to the postal hall in front, but are double-hung sashes rather than hinged casements. The gable ends have painted horizontally-laid boarding, coming down to just above the window-heads, with simple, deep-chord bargeboards. The roof has exposed rafters and angled eaves. It appears to have a small flat roof and timber bracketing directly onto the house wall.

=== Key areas/elements ===
- Federation characteristics
- Earlier Victorian fabric
- Streetscape presence

=== Condition ===
The post hall has been refurbished in the standard Australia Post retail format, with a suspended ceiling and recessed fluorescent lighting. The offices and service rooms have been refurbished at varying stages. Refurbishment of interiors has occurred at varying times through the twentieth century to around the mid-1990s.

Much of the original fabric of the quarters is extant including panelled timber doors (some with original hardware), timber stairs, architraves, skirtings and fireplaces. Although some partitioning has been added in recent years, the original planning of the quarters is still determinable.

The building is generally in good condition in both the interior and exterior. Overall the level of intactness is comparatively high relative to the 1898 works.

=== Original fabric ===
The original fabric of the building that still exists includes:

- Structural frame: Load-bearing (solid) brick with timber floor and roof framing.
- External walls: face load-bearing brick, with some cement render dressings on walls, chimneys and other elements.
- Internal walls: load-bearing brick with hard plaster finish, others are timber framed partitions clad in plasterboard/lathe and plaster and painted.
- Floor: mixed; concrete (lower, post office) timber frame in upper and part of the lower level. Clad in carpet (retail and rear office areas), vinyl tile (lunchroom, storage areas) ceramic tiles (amenities and wet areas).
- Ceiling: some plasterboard on lower level; some suspended with aluminium grid frame supporting acoustic tiles. On upper level lath and plaster.
- Roof: Marseilles- patterned terracotta tile (quarters); tile and some metal decking (post office, quarters porch). Corrugated galvanised steel sheet roofing on rear single-storey section.

=== Timeline of development ===
1882: initial construction.

1898: a Federation Free style envelope and breakfront postal hall added around the original building under Walter Vernon's aegis as New South Wales Government Architect. George Oakeshott may have been the designer.

1910: addition of the telephone exchange.

== Heritage listing ==
The significant components of Camden Post Office include the evolved main postal building and the two-storey former residence sited behind, which retains original fabric extending to the rear. Elements which are not of heritage significance include the new post box porch, with awning over, and ramp, along the lane on the north-east side of the building.

Camden Post Office was listed on the Australian Commonwealth Heritage List on 22 August 2012 having satisfied the following criteria.

Criterion A: Processes

Camden Post Office, the original component of which dates to 1882, with later works the most substantial of which date from 1898, is located in an historic centre which dates from the earliest years of settlement in New South Wales. Camden is of considerable importance in terms of early Australian developments in wool in particular, following the original land grant to pioneer John Macarthur in 1805, with the first post office operating locally from about 1841. The current post office, while associated with the comparatively later history of the town, is still of nineteenth century origin, with its establishment and subsequent development reflecting the needs of postal services in the town. Although an evolved building physically and architecturally, it remains evidently a historic postal building. Its prominent location in the main town strip of Argyle Street, also enhances this aspect of significance.

Criterion D: Characteristic values

Camden Post Office is an example of:

- a post office and telegraph office with quarters (second generation typology 1870–1929)
- an example of Late Victorian (1880s) and Federation Free Style (1898, 1910) architecture
- the work of the New South Wales Government Architect's Office under direction of James Barnet (1882), Walter Vernon (1898, 1910), and George Oakeshott

Typologically, Camden Post Office is a composite building comprising an initial construction stage of 1882; a Federation Free Style envelope and breakfront postal hall added around the original building under Walter Vernon's aegis as New South Wales Government Architect in 1898; and a 1910 telephone exchange likely to be by George Oakeshott. The 1898 residence largely remains, with much of the original fabric extant and the planning still discernible. The original location of the 1910 telephone exchange inside the building is not known, however. A new post box porch has also been built along the lane on the northeast side of the building. More broadly, as a composite building, the typological intactness has been compromised, despite the relative overall intactness of the 1898 works.

Architecturally and stylistically, the 1898 exterior of the post office can be considered in the Federation context of the post office form, and is a Free style post office in the tradition of a number of other buildings by Walter Vernon and his office. Camden does come comparatively early in this group, which mark Vernon's middle period as Government Architect. As such the post office could be considered a prototype for a large series of Vernon-era buildings, designed by George Oakeshott and others in Vernon's office. The parapeted breakfront post office design, with a porch to one side, also predated the appearance of similar post offices around the country.

Criterion E: Aesthetic characteristics

Camden Post Office, although a composite building comprising a central Victorian building with substantial Federation additions, has a strong streetscape presence, with a handsome façade and detailing to Argyle Street. More broadly, the building also contributes to the historic character of central Camden. The post office additionally features in tourism promotional material which celebrates Camden's diversity of architectural styles.

Criterion H: Significant people

Camden Post Office is significant for its association with architect Walter Vernon and his office, particularly for being a comparatively early design of Vernon's in the Federation Free style post office mode. As such the post office could be considered a prototype for a large series of Vernon-era buildings, designed by George Oakeshott and others in Vernon's office.
