= Silverdale, New South Wales =

Silverdale
- Town
- Silverdale, NSW

- Coordinates: 33°56′32″S 150°34′48″E
- Country: Australia
- State: New South Wales
- LGAs: Wollondilly Shire; City of Liverpool
- Location: 72 km (45 mi) W of Sydney; 29 km (18 mi) SW of Camden; 22 km (14 mi) SSW of Penrith
- Established: 1828 (198 years ago)

Government
  - State electorate: Wollondilly
  - Federal division: Hume
- Elevation: 187 m (614 ft)

Population
  - Total: 4,534 (2021 census)
- Postcode: 2752
- County: Camden
- Parish: Warragamba
- Mean max temp: 24.0 °C (75.2 °F)
- Mean min temp: 10.9 °C (51.6 °F)
- Annual rainfall: 751.5 mm (29.59 in)
Localities around Silverdale
Blue Mountains National Park	Warragamba	Wallacia
Blue Mountains National Park	Silverdale	Greendale
Blue Mountains National Park	Werombi	Cobbitty

Silverdale is a small town in New South Wales, Australia, situated in the local government areas of the Wollondilly Shire, with a minor easterly section in the City of Liverpool. Approximately 30 minutes from the city of Camden, Silverdale is close to the historic township of Warragamba, and the main water supply for Sydney, Warragamba Dam.

The town's development increased with the construction of the dam. Silverdale is remarkably isolated from the increasing urbanisation of the Penrith City area, although the new housing estates are an example of increasing development in the area.

== Education ==
The local primary school is Warragamba Public School and Holy Family Primary school in Luddenham. The feeder high school for the region used to be Elderslie High School near Camden (35 km distance). The feeder high school changed to Glenmore Park High School in 2009 (24 km distance). Private schools in the region include Nepean Christian School (15 km distance), Penrith Christian School (23 km distance) and many children travel to Caroline Chisholm College in Glenmore Park (21 km distance) and St Dominic's College Kingswood (25 km distance), both of which have their respective 4010 and 4110 buses to the area.

== Transport ==
Silverdale is only accessible via Silverdale Road, southbound up Baines Hill from Penrith or northbound from Oakdale. The nearest rail transport is Penrith railway station, Sydney, with Busways bus route 795 operating from this location during the morning and afternoon. Construction of the Second Sydney Airport, which commenced in 2016, is in the nearby town of Badgerys Creek.

== Population ==
In the 2021 census, the population of Silverdale was 4,543. Silverdale is a popular location for families, accounting for more than 85% of households in the township. The weekly median household income in 2021 was $2,654, significantly higher than the NSW median weekly income for households of $1,486.
