= Lakesland, New South Wales =

Lakesland
- Town
- Coordinates: 34°10′S 150°32′E
- Country: Australia
- State: New South Wales
- Region: Macarthur
- LGA: Wollondilly Shire
- Location: 94 km (58 mi) WSW of Sydney CBD; 41 km (25 mi) N of Mittagong

Government
  - State electorate: Wollondilly
  - Federal division: Hume
- Elevation: 350 m (1,150 ft)

Population
  - Total: 499 (SAL 2021)
- Postcode: 2572
Localities around Lakesland
Oakdale	The Oaks	Mowbray Park
Nattai National Park	Lakesland	Picton
	Thirlmere Lakes National Park	Thirlmere

Lakesland is a locality next to the Nattai National Park of New South Wales, Australia, in Wollondilly Shire. At the 2021 census, Lakesland had a population of 499.
