= Razorback, New South Wales =

Razorback
- Town
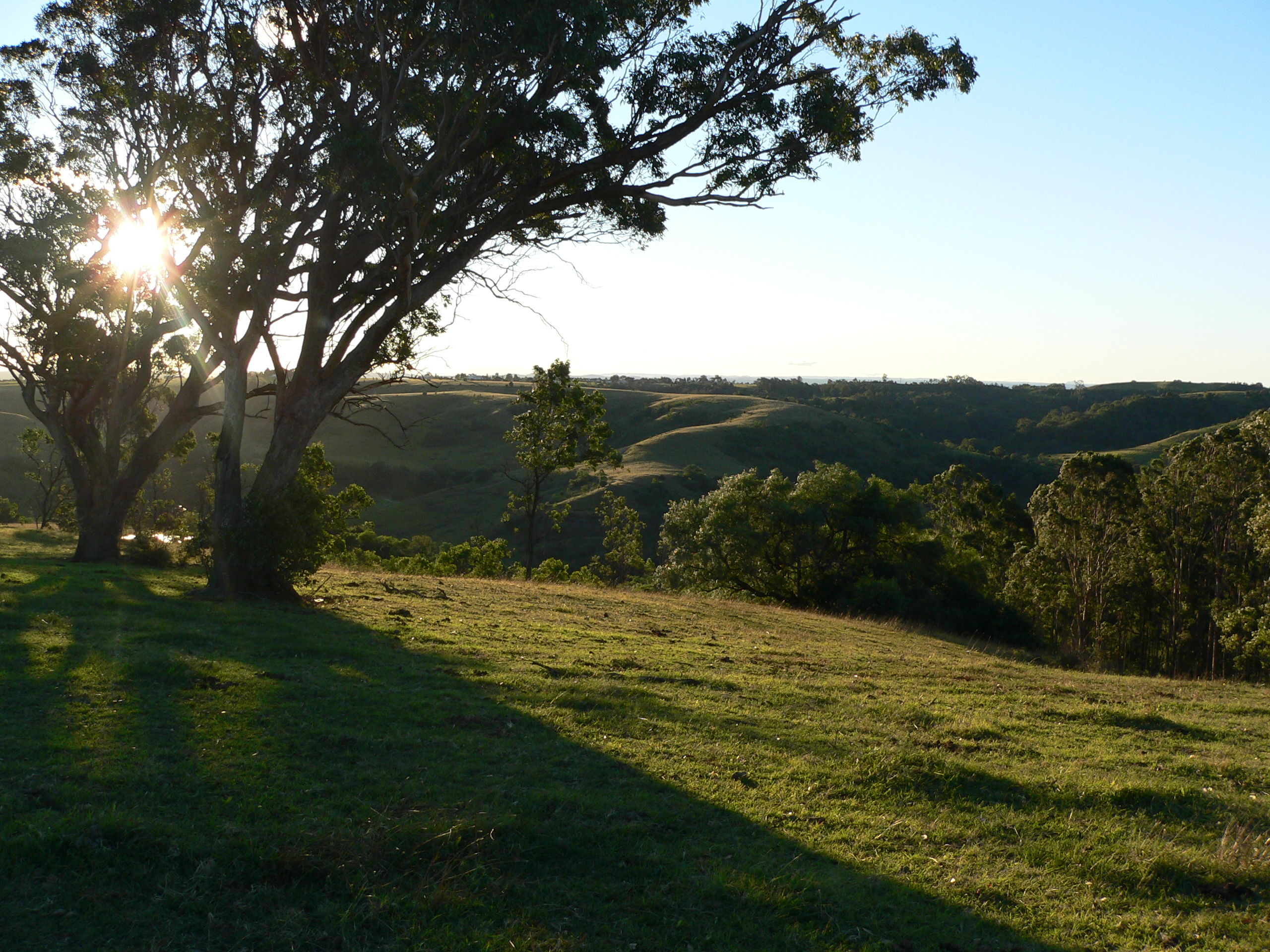
- Hills of the Razorback Range located in between Camden and Picton

- Coordinates: 34°09′03″S 150°40′47″E
- Country: Australia
- State: New South Wales
- Region: Macarthur
- LGA: Wollondilly
- Location: 80 km (50 mi) SW of Sydney; 52 km (32 mi) NE of Mittagong

Government
  - State electorate: Wollondilly
  - Federal division: Hume
- Elevation: 303 m (994 ft)

Population
  - Total: 1,174 (2021 census)
- Postcode: 2571
Localities around Razorback
Mount Hunter	Cawdor	Menangle
Picton	Razorback	Douglas Park
Picton	Maldon	Wilton

Razorback is a locality and scattered village in the Macarthur Region of New South Wales, Australia, in the Wollondilly Shire. At the 2021 census, the locality had a population of 1,174. It is in between the main Macarthur towns of Picton (to the south) and Camden (to the north).

It is commonly referred to as Razorback Range as it is part range of high steep hills that make up the Macarthur Region. Furthermore, like most of the Wollondilly it is part of the hills that are in between the Blue Mountains and Southern Highlands regions.

At the top of Razorback contains a lookout which offers panoramic views of the Campbelltown-Camden urban district as well as the metropolitan Sydney as a whole.

It was the scene of the Razorback Blockade in 1979.
