= Wollondilly Shire =

- Local government area
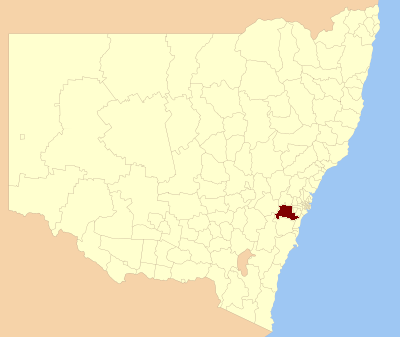
- Location in Outer Metropolitan Sydney

- Interactive map of Wollondilly Shire
- Coordinates: 34°11′S 150°36′E
- Country: Australia
- State: New South Wales
- Region: Macarthur; Blue Mountains; Greater Western Sydney
- Established: 7 March 1906
- Council seat: Picton

Government
  - Mayor: Matt Gould
  - State electorates: Camden; Campbelltown; Heathcote; Wollondilly
  - Federal divisions: Cunningham; Hume; Macquarie

Area
  - Total: 2,560 km^{2} (990 sq mi)

Population
  - Total: 53,961 (LGA 2021)
- Website: Wollondilly Shire
LGAs around Wollondilly Shire
Blue Mountains	Blue Mountains	Liverpool & Penrith
Oberon	Wollondilly Shire	Campbelltown & Camden
Upper Lachlan	Wingecarribee	Wollongong

Wollondilly Shire is a periurban local government area that is located on the far southwest fringe of the Greater Sydney area in New South Wales, Australia. The local government area is part of the Macarthur and Blue Mountains regions. The Wollondilly Shire is seen as the transition between Regional NSW and the Greater Sydney area, as it meets the Sydney urban area to rural areas. Wollondilly Shire was created by proclamation in the NSW Government Gazette on 7 March 1906, following the passing of the Local Government (Shires) Act 1905, and amalgamated with the Municipality of Picton on 1 May 1940.

Wollondilly Shire is named after the Wollondilly River. The area is traversed by the Hume Highway and the Southern Highlands railway line. Wollondilly Shire contains several small towns and villages broken up by farms and sandstone gorges. To its west is wilderness and includes the Nattai Wilderness and the Burragorang Valley. The majority of the Shire is either national park or forms part of the water catchment for Sydney's water supply. The Shire provides 97% of Sydney's water supply with the Warragamba Dam holding 80% of that.

The mayor is Matt Gould. He is the first popularly elected mayor and was elected as an independent candidate.

== Towns, villages and localities in the local government area ==
Towns, villages and localities in the Wollondilly Shire are:

- Appin
- Bargo
- Belimbla Park
- Blue Mountains National Park
- Brownlow Hill
- Buxton
- Camden Park
- Cataract
- Cawdor
- Couridjah
- Darkes Forest
- Douglas Park
- Glenmore
- Lakesland
- Maldon
- Menangle
- Mount Hunter
- Mowbray Park
- Nattai
- Oakdale
- Orangeville
- Pheasants Nest
- Picton
- Razorback
- Silverdale
- Tahmoor
- Theresa Park
- The Oaks
- Thirlmere
- Wallacia
- Warragamba
- Werombi
- Wilton, including the estate of Bingara Gorge
- Yanderra
- Yerranderie

== Council history ==
Wollondilly Shire was constituted by proclamation in the NSW Government Gazette on 7 March 1906, following the passing of the Local Government (Shires) Act 1905 (Shire No. 122 of 134), and included a wide area bounded by the local government areas of Camden, Campbelltown and Picton and Nepean Shire. A temporary council of five members was appointed on 16 May 1906, which comprised: Richard Henry Antill of Jarvisfield, Picton, Thomas Donohue of Burragorang, George Frederick Litchfield of Yerranderie, George Macarthur-Onslow of Camden Park, Menangle, and John Simpson of Macquarie Dale, Appin. The council first met on 15 June 1906, electing Macarthur-Onslow as Chairman of the Temporary Council and C. A. Thompson as secretary and shire clerk. A. P. Minton, was later appointed Shire Clerk in June 1907.

The first elections for the council were held on 24 November 1906 for six councillors in three ridings of two councillors each: A Riding, B Riding and C Riding:

Riding	Councillor	Notes
A Riding	John Edward Moore	Shire President 1907–1908
A Riding	Alfred Leonard Bennett	Shire President 1909–1910
B Riding	James Oswald Moore	Shire President 1908–1909
B Riding	George Frederick Litchfield	Temporary Councillor
C Riding	John Simpson	Temporary Councillor
C Riding	George Macarthur-Onslow	Chairman 1906, Shire President 1906–1907

The final meeting of the Temporary Council and the first meeting of the elected Council was held on 3 December 1906 at The Oaks, at which the chairman of the Temporary Council, George Macarthur-Onslow was elected at the first Shire President of Wollondilly. However, on 11 January 1907, Macarthur-Onslow resigned as president, citing the distance between the shire offices and his home at Camden Park, and John E. Moore was elected Shire President in his place. On 13 February 1908, James O. Moore was elected as Shire President, and re-elected to a second term in February 1909. Following the resignation of James O. Moore in June 1909, Alfred Leonard Bennett was elected Shire President of the on 8 June 1909.

On 31 May 1911 part of the Blue Mountains Shire was transferred to the Wollondilly Shire and part of Wollondilly Shire was transferred to the Nepean Shire from 21 March 1940.

=== Amalgamation with Picton ===
When created in 1906, Wollondilly did not include the township of Picton, which had already been incorporated as the Borough of Picton on 15 March 1895. The Borough of Picton became the Municipality of Picton on 31 December 1906 with the passing of the Local Government Extension Act, 1906.

The Picton Municipal Council held a voluntary poll on 1 April 1939, at the request of residents, on the question of the union of the Picton Municipality and the Wollondilly Shire. The poll was resolved in the affirmative, with 197 for and 178 against. The proposal for a "Picton Shire" was subsequently gazetted on 25 August 1939 and on 20 November 1939 the Department of Works and Local Government held an inquiry in Picton on the various issues relating to amalgamation.

From 1 May 1940 the Municipality of Picton was amalgamated into Wollondilly Shire and the Shire Council was then expanded to consist of eight councillors representing four ridings. The first Provisional Council comprised: George John Adams and Edgar Henry Kirk Downes for A Riding; Eric Moore and Septimus Ernest Prosser for B Riding; James Thomas Carroll and Edward Wonson for C Riding' and John Bradburn Cartwright and Roy Carrington Pearce for D Riding. The council seat was subsequently moved from The Oaks to Picton.

== Demographics ==
At the 2016 census, there were 48,519 people in the Wollondilly local government area, with an equal proportion of males and females. Aboriginal and Torres Strait Islander people made up 2.4% of the population which is on par with the national average. The median age of people in the Wollondilly Shire was 36 years. Children aged 0–14 years made up 23.1% of the population and people aged 65 years and over made up 10.8% of the population. Of people in the area aged 15 years and over, 54.9% were married and 10.4% were either divorced or separated.

Population growth in the Wollondilly Shire between the 2001 Census and the 2006 Census was 9.18%; and in the subsequent five years to the 2011 Census, population growth was 7.23%. This was higher than the population growth for Australia from 2001 to 2006 (5.78%) but less than the national figure for 2006 to 2011 (8.32%). The median weekly income for residents within the Wollondilly Shire was marginally higher than the national average.

At the 2011 Census, the proportion of residents in the Wollondilly local government area who stated their ancestry as Australian or Anglo-Saxon was more than 63% (national average was 65.2%). More than 69% of Wollondilly Shire residents nominated a religious affiliation of Christianity at the 2011 Census, which was well above the national average of 50.2%. Compared to the national average, there was a lower than average proportion of households in the Wollondilly local government area (8.3%) where two or more languages were spoken (national average was 20.4%), and a significantly higher proportion (91.2%) where English only was spoken at home (national average was 76.8%).

Selected historical census data for Wollondilly local government area
Census year		2001	2006	2011	2016	2021
Population	Estimated residents on census night	36,953	40,344	43,259	48,519	53,961
Population	Average population growth p/a		1.84%	▼1.45%	▲2.43%	▼2.23%
Population	LGA rank in terms of size within New South Wales		54th	▲49th	▲47th	▲46th
Population	% of New South Wales population	0.59%	▲0.62%	▲0.63%	▲0.65%	▲0.67%
Population	% of Australian population	0.20%	0.20%	0.20%	▲0.21%	0.21%
Median weekly incomes						
Personal income	Median weekly personal income		A$502	▲ A$617	▲ A$738	▲ A$877
Personal income	% of Australian median income		107.7%	▼106.9%	▲111.5%	▼108.9%
Family income	Median weekly family income		A$1,186	▲ A$1,661	▲ A$2,032	▲ A$2,350
Family income	% of Australian median income		115.5%	▼112.2%	▲117.2%	▼110.8%
Household income	Median weekly household income		A$1,321	▲ A$1,478	▲ A$1,871	▲ A$2,151
Household income	% of Australian median income		112.8%	▲119.8%	▲130.1%	▼123.2%

Selected historical census data for Camden local government area
Ancestry, top responses
2001		2006		2011		2016		2021	
No Data		No Data		Australian	33.9%	Australian	▼33.3%	Australian	▲43.5%
No Data		No Data		English	29.2%	English	▼28.2%	English	▲39.5%
No Data		No Data		Irish	7.9%	Irish	▼7.7%	Irish	▲10.3%
No Data		No Data		Scottish	6.2%	Scottish	▲6.4%	Scottish	▲9.1%
No Data		No Data		Italian	2.9%	Italian	▲3.4%	Italian	▲5.4%
Country of birth, top responses
2001		2006		2011		2016		2021	
Australia	81.1%	Australia	▲81.9%	Australia	▲83.1%	Australia	▼82.1%	Australia	▲84.2%
England	5.2%	England	▼4.5%	England	▼4.3%	England	▼3.8%	England	▼3.3%
New Zealand	0.9%	New Zealand	▲1.0%	New Zealand	1.0%	New Zealand	1.0%	New Zealand	1.0%
Scotland	0.7%	Scotland	▼0.6%	Scotland	0.6%	Scotland	▼0.5%	Scotland	0.5%
Italy	0.6%	Italy	▼0.5%	Italy	0.5%	Italy	▼0.4%	Italy	0.4%
Germany	0.6%	Germany	▼0.5%	Germany	▼0.4%	Germany	0.4%	Malta	▲0.4%
Language, top responses (other than English)
2001		2006		2011		2016		2021	
Italian	0.8%	Italian	0.8%	Italian	0.8%	Italian	▼0.7%	Italian	0.7%
Arabic	0.5%	Arabic	0.5%	Arabic	▼0.4%	Arabic	▲0.6%	Arabic	▲0.7%
Maltese	0.5%	Maltese	▼0.4%	Maltese	0.4%	Spanish	▲0.4%	Spanish	▲0.5%
German	0.4%	Greek	▲0.3%	Greek	0.3%	Maltese	0.4%	Maltese	0.4%
Estonian	0.4%	German	▼0.3%	German	0.3%	Greek	0.3%	Croatian	▲0.3%
Religious affiliation, top responses
2001		2006		2011		2016		2021	
Anglican	33.4%	Anglican	▼32.3%	Anglican	▲32.5%	Catholic	▼30.2%	No Religion	▲31.9%
Catholic	29.3%	Catholic	▲30.1%	Catholic	▲30.9%	Anglican	▼27.5%	Catholic	▼28.8%
No Religion	11.2%	No Religion	▲13.7%	No Religion	▲15.4%	No Religion	▲21.4%	Anglican	▼21.1%
United Church	5.3%	United Church	▼4.2%	United Church	▼3.8%	Uniting Church	▼3.0%	United Church	▼2.0%
Presbyterian and Reformed	3.2%	Presbyterian and Reformed	▼2.8%	Presbyterian and Reformed	▼2.4%	Presbyterian and Reformed	▼2.0%	Christian (Undefined)	▲1.7%

== Council ==
=== Current composition and election method ===
Wollondilly Shire Council is composed of nine councillors elected proportionally as two wards, each electing 4 councillors as well as a popularly elected mayor who is elected at large. All councillors are elected for a fixed four-year term of office.

Party	Councillors
Independents	9
Total	9

The current council was elected in October 2024, with the current Mayor Matt Gould being the first popularly elected mayor in the history of the shire. Prior to this the mayor was elected by the councillors for a period of 2 years. The Mayor and Councillors are also allocated one or more portfolios that they have strategic oversight of. The current members of the council are:

Ward	Councillor	Party	Portfolios	Notes
Mayor	Matt Gould	Independent	Agriculture and Rural Industries, Indigenous	Mayor Dec 2021–present, Deputy Mayor 2018–2020
East Ward	Matthew Deeth	Independent		Deputy Mayor Dec 2021–present, Mayor 2018–2020
East Ward	Suzy Brandstater	Independent	People and Community	
East Ward	Paul Rogers	Independent	Place, Landscape and Environment	
East Ward	Benn Banasik	Independent		
North Ward	Ally Dench	Independent	Tourism & Local Jobs	
North Ward	Hilton Gibbs	Independent		Deputy Mayor 2015–2016
North Ward	Jacqueline Jenson	Independent		
North Ward	Trish Hill	Independent	Arts and Heritage	

== Election results ==
=== 2024 ===
2024 New South Wales local elections: Wollondilly
Party	Votes	%	Swing	Seats	Change
Matt Gould Team	15,270	46.9		4	
Experienced To Lead	6,438	19.8		2	
Team Purple	3,611	11.1		1	
Independent Liberal	1,101	3.4		0	
Bev Spearpoint Team	849	2.6		0	
Independents	5,274	16.2		1	
Formal votes	32,543	88.9			
Informal votes	4,080	11.1			
Total	36,623			8	
Registered voters / turnout					

== Heritage listings ==
The Wollondilly Shire has a number of heritage-listed sites, including:

- Appin, Cataract Road: Cataract Dam
- Appin, Wilton Road: Windmill Hill, Appin
- Bargo, Avon Dam Road: Nepean Dam
- Bargo, Hume Highway: Wirrimbirra Sanctuary
- Bargo, Main Southern railway 96.265 km: Bargo railway viaduct
- Camden Park, Elizabeth Macarthur Avenue: Camden Park Estate
- Cordeaux, Cordeaux River: Cordeaux Dam
- Couridjah, Main Southern railway: Couridjah railway station
- Menangle, Main Southern railway: Menangle railway station
- Menangle, Main Southern railway: Nepean River railway bridge, Menangle
- Orangeville, Brownlow Hill Loop Road: Brownlow Hill Estate
- Picton, Hume Highway Deviation: Jarvisfield
- Picton, Main Southern railway: Picton railway station
- Picton, Main Southern railway: Stonequarry Creek railway viaduct, Picton
- Picton, Oaks Road: Abbotsford
- Picton, Prince Street: Victoria Bridge, Picton
- Tahmoor, Main Southern railway: Tahmoor railway station
- Thirlmere, NSW Rail Transport Museum, Barbour Road: Rail Paybus FP1
- Warragamba, Coxs River Arms: Coxs River track
- Warragamba, Warragamba Dam: Megarritys Bridge
- Warragamba, Warragamba Dam: Warragamba Dam – Haviland Park
- Warragamba, Warragamba Dam: Warragamba Dam Emergency Scheme
- Wilton, Wilton Park Road: Wilton Park

== Local media ==
Wollondilly is home to two local newspapers, the District Reporter and the Wollondilly Express. Other regional media which serve the area are radio stations, 2MCR and C91.3FM, and the "Macarthur Chronicle" a regional newspaper covering the wider Macarthur Region.

== Waste management ==
The Spring Farm Resource Recovery Park at Spring Farm processes household waste from the Campbelltown City Council, Camden Council, Wollondilly Shire Council and Wingecarribee Shire Council areas. The site includes a materials recycling facility (MRF) for sorting kerbside recyclables and recovering reusable materials. General waste and garden organics are temporarily stored before being transferred to landfill and commercial composting facilities, respectively.
