= Rail Paybus FP1 =

Pay Bus FP1
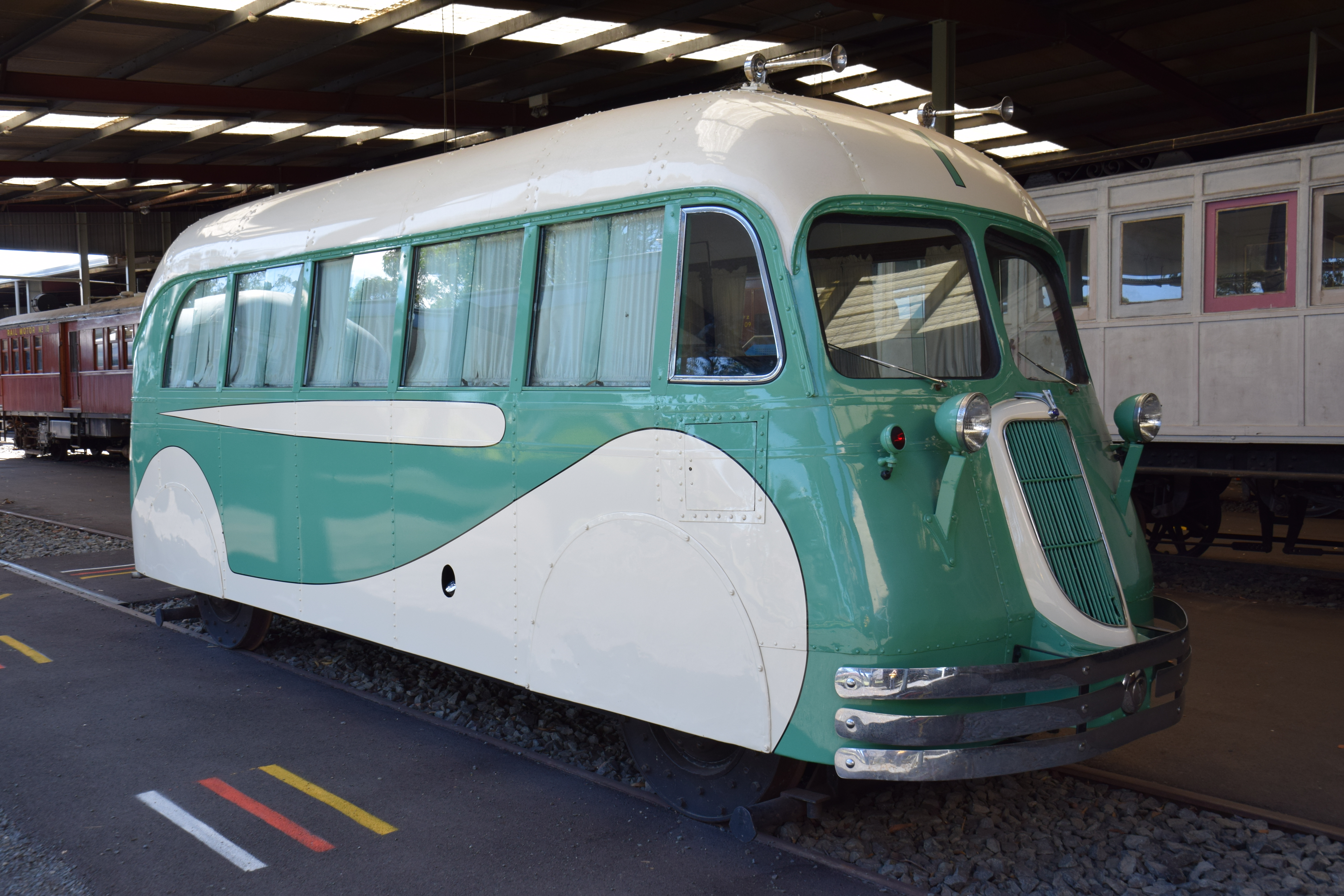
- FP1 at the New South Wales Railway Museum, Thirlmere
Type and origin
- Power type: Diesel mechanical
- Builder: Waddingtons; Commonwealth Engineering
- Build date: 1937
Specifications
- Gauge: 1,435 mm (4 ft 8 1/2 in) standard gauge
- Fuel type: Diesel
Career
- Operators: Department of Railways New South Wales
- Class: FP Paybuses
- Disposition: Static display at the NSW Rail Museum, Thirlmere

Rail Paybus FP1 is a heritage-listed former railbus and now museum exhibit at NSW Rail Transport Museum Barbour Road, in the outer south-western Sydney town of Thirlmere in the Wollondilly Shire local government area of New South Wales, Australia. It was designed by the New South Wales Government Railways Road Motor Section and built in 1937 by Waddingtons Ltd (body), Ford Motor Co. (chassis and mechanical components). It is also known as Rail Bus and Rail Pay Bus FP1. The property is owned by Rail Corporation New South Wales, an agency of the Government of New South Wales. It was added to the New South Wales State Heritage Register on 26 September 2003.

== History ==
=== Origins ===
The first group of rail buses, of which FP1 was the first, were built in 1937 to an overall design of the NSW Railways' Road Motor section, by coach-building firm Waddingtons Pty Ltd, Granville (subsequently to become Commonwealth Engineering).

Although essentially similar, in being constructed on a truck chassis with Ford mechanicals (V8 petrol engine and gearbox), the bodies of this group, numbered FP1 to FP6, differed somewhat. No's 1 and 6 were single ended, and originally had to be turned (using a locomotive turntable or a triangle junction) at each end of a run. Despite their design similarities, FP1 was different in style from FP6, while both the single-ended buses were different from Nos. 2 to 5, which were substantially identical. As well as having driving controls at both ends, buses Nos. 2 to 5 were slightly larger, and had a door on both sides, originally accommodating 18 passengers.

The rail bus concept was intended to provide a passenger service on minor branch lines where the available traffic did not support economic use of a conventional steam-hauled passenger or mixed train, or even a rail-motor service provided by one of the relatively new "42 footer" CPH "tin hare" motors. FP1 entered service on 7 July 1937, and apparently operated in the south-west of the state, with some evidence that it suffered a failure at Grenfell on 29 November. The rest of the fleet entered service in September 1937, Nos. 2, 3 and 4 on the 27th. The others may well have entered service on the same date, but this is not recorded.

It appears that the rail bus concept was less than successful, because all were withdrawn from passenger service, to be used as pay buses, within a year or two of their commissioning. It is not recorded why they were not successful, but it is likely that the depressed economic circumstances of the time impacted on the number of available passengers, while road transport was by that time emerging as a serious threat to rail, particularly for passenger services – the road bus concept being by then quite well established.

Information on when FP1 and its sisters were converted to pay buses is sketchy. FP1 is thought to have been converted in September 1937, so that its career as a passenger vehicle was very brief indeed, but it has also been suggested that the conversion occurred some time after its failure at Grenfell in November, possibly in conjunction with repairs. In any case, it had certainly become a pay bus by 30 June 1938, as it is noted as such in the Railways Department's Annual Report for 1937–38.

It is believed that the other buses of this group entered service variously at Harden and Cowra (still in 1937). Most sources state that they began, as with FP1, as passenger vehicles, but there is also a suggestion that they never entered this service at all, being used as pay buses from the outset. In view of the record in the Annual Report for 1937–38 of only one pay bus, it seems likely that the conversion of Nos. 2 to 6 occurred after June 1938, so that they were all commissioned as passenger buses.

=== In service ===
David Cooke's book Rail Motors and XPT's indicates that the Railways' 1938–39 Annual Report records a general overhaul of FP1 in October 1938, carried out mainly to ascertain the degree of wear, as the vehicle had travelled some 74,000 kilometres (46,000 mi) since it entered service. Apparently the results were pleasing, as cylinder bore wear was negligible.

The most significant event involving a pay bus was the infamous Yanderra pay bus incident of 8 December 1941. At approx. 11.40 a.m. Pay Bus FP5 was heading in the down direction south of Yanderra Station on the Main Southern line, when explosives placed under the line by intending thieves were detonated, de-railing and severely damaging the bus. The crew of three were all killed.

The culprits, believed to be two men, escaped with some (Pounds) 2000 in loose notes and change, but most of the money carried remained in the safe, which was fixed to the bus chassis. The bus was so badly damaged that it was written off (in November 1942). A replacement, again built by Waddingtons, entered service in September 1945 as No. 5 (2nd). This new bus was single-ended, being patterned on No.6.

All the surviving pay buses were transferred to the Mechanical Branch in 1942, presumably as part of a reorganisation – possibly the original Road Motor section being absorbed into the Mechanical Branch. All except No. 2 (and of course also excepting No. 5) were transferred on 23 August that year, with No. 2 apparently following on 5 October.

FP1 received another general overhaul in June 1943, and again in 1949 after it was submerged by floodwaters at Maitland.

=== Modifications in service ===
Apart from the minor changes required to convert them to pay buses, these vehicles received various modifications during their life. Nos.3 and 6 suffered accident damage in 1940 and 1942 respectively, and it is likely that subsequent repairs involved minor modifications. No. 4 was fitted with a canopy or double roof in 1947, while it appears that at least Nos. 1, 5 (2nd) and 6 were similarly fitted at some stage. From photographic evidence, it is certain that at least No. 5 (2nd) was so fitted by 1956 (and of course No.1, which still has this feature). Nos. 4 and 6 are recorded as having chassis fractures repaired in the 1960s, and this may have entailed some degree of modification – e.g. strengthening.

It has been stated that the engines originally fitted were of the Ford Mercury type. However this is unlikely since this model was not introduced until 1939. In all probability the original engines were the 1937 Model 78, with 21-stud cylinder heads. These were to the basic 3.62 litres (221 in^{3}) side-valve V8 design introduced by Ford in 1932.*

All the buses were originally fitted with a pair of headlights at waist level at each end, together with circular marker lights, but by c. 1950, and probably earlier, these had been removed and replaced with a single roof-mounted headlight at each end, and these remained throughout their life. For a brief period, some buses, including FP1, had both the twin lights and the roof mounted light at the same time, as a transitional arrangement. At around the same time, new marker lights with twin lenses were provided. It appears that the single-ended buses did not receive their headlight at the rear until they were modified for reverse running. Although no external horns were fitted originally, photographic evidence suggests that all the buses had twin air horns fitted on the roof from c. 1939–40. Again from photographs and comparison with FP1 in its present configuration, it is evident that the radiator grille was changed at some stage.

Some time after conversion to pay buses, the single-ended buses were modified to allow reverse running. This entailed body modifications (retractable air scoops) to provide engine cooling, and mechanical changes including to the transmission (addition of a supplementary reversing gearbox). The driving position (and location of the instruments) was also altered. All sources are silent on when this modification was made, but it seems likely that it happened fairly early in their life, as turning such a small vehicle using a steam locomotive turntable must surely have seemed like overkill.

During the 1950s, some of the buses were fitted with visors above the windscreens to reduce glare when travelling into the sun, but it is not clear which units had this modification. It is uncertain whether No.1 was one of the buses which received this addition; there are no photos showing it, there is no evidence of such a fitting, and it is not fitted now.

Relatively late in their lives, several of the rail buses were apparently fitted with English Ford Thames engines, probably because the US version was no longer available, having been displaced by an overhead valve design in the early 1950s. FP1 received its new engine in December 1964, FP3 in August 1969, and FP6 in January 1962. The Thames engine was of the same basic Ford side-valve pre-war design, but reverted to 21-stud cylinder heads, the same as the original 1937 version. The engine currently fitted to Pay Bus FP1 is of this type.

=== Livery ===
All the original rail buses were painted green and cream, but the livery design varied. The photo on Page 2 shows the original livery for FP1, with sweeping curves in cream over the wheel spats and a cream flash under the windows, in what would now be called art-deco style.

The double-ended buses were originally painted in a much simpler style, with cream down to the waist-line, sweeping down at the ends to the bottom of the grille.

Later 1939-40, the double-ended buses were painted in a simplified scheme, green, with cream down to the waist without the flaring down at the ends. This change seems to have occurred at about the same time as the roof-mounted headlights and horns were fitted. This is shown in the photo of No. 2 on Page 8.

Another green and yellow scheme was used at least on FP1, and photos exist of it in a darker green all over, with cream or yellow window and windscreen surrounds. It has been suggested that at some stage in the 1940s, FP1 at least was painted in yet another green/yellow scheme, being overall dark green, with yellow lining above and below the windows. This scheme is similar to that shown in the cover photo, applied when restored by the Rail Transport Museum 1970.

The final in-service livery carried by these buses was an all-over Indian Red scheme with Chrome Yellow lining, thought to have first been applied in the mid 1950s, when Indian Red livery became the NSWGR standard for the new main-line diesel-electric locomotives then being introduced, the 42 Class (1955). This scheme is shown in the photo of No. 6 below. (Note: Indian Red is sometimes called Tuscan Red, but the two were different.)

=== Themes ===
Rail Pay Bus FP1 and its sisters obviously fit into the state historical theme of transport. It could also be argued that these buses made a contribution to technological development, as an early attempt to apply road bus technology to rail transport. The first such attempt was Rail Motor No. 1, which in 1919 involved the conversion of a road truck chassis and drive-train for passenger transport by rail, with a classic timber carriage body based on railway practice. However the FP series rail buses were much more strongly based on road buses, both in technology and appearance. Through their role in paying remote Railway personnel, the Pay Buses were also part of an important social institution in rural communities around the state, where the Railways were such an important (and paternalistic) employer and a vital element of country life in particular.

=== Scrapping ===
All members of this first group of rail buses except No. 5 (1st) were withdrawn from service between 1968 and 1970. FP1 was withdrawn on 3 October 1968. All except FP1 were scrapped in December 1970. Pay Bus FP1 was designated for preservation and placed in the care of the NSW Rail Transport Museum on 27 March 1969.

Withdrawal and subsequent scrapping of the original group was enabled by the commissioning of a new group of six pay buses (plus, remarkably enough, one 18-seat passenger bus of the same basic configuration) in 1968. Designated FP7 to 13, this group were built by Commonwealth Engineering Pty Ltd, Granville - the successor to Waddingtons. Although now withdrawn from service and sold, following the introduction of more modern methods of paying staff, several of the later group still exist in preservation, including the RTM's Nos. 7, 10 & 12.

=== Rail Pay Bus FP 1 ===
The Rail Transport Museum having taken custody of it in 1969, FP1 was first moved, under its own power, to the RTM's initial site at Petersham. Then when space was made available for the Museum at Enfield Locomotive Depot, FP1 was moved there, again under its own power. While it was at Enfield, Rail Transport Museum personnel cosmetically restored it by repairing body rust and minor panel damage and re-painting it in the livery seen in the cover photo. FP1 was placed on display when the Museum opened to the public on 22 October 1972.

In 1975 the pay bus was moved to the new Museum site at Thirlmere along with other exhibits, and initially placed on display on a short section of track under a car-port roof. It is said that it may have once ventured onto and run on the Loop Line (now the Thirlmere Heritage Railway). It has not been worked on since, nor has it been on display since it was superficially damaged in a shunting accident c. 1982.

== Description ==
Because of it was designed by the Road Motor Section of the Railways and built by one of Sydney's leading bus body builders of the time, this vehicle demonstrates a considerable number of bus features. This was no doubt a deliberate ploy to emphasise the "bus" concept as opposed to a standard rail vehicle. Its design is typical of the art deco period with rounded body panels and flowing curves favoured by the motor vehicle designers of the time. The style was accentuated by the paint scheme adopted, again similar to road bus styling.

In contrast to four other vehicles which entered service at the same time, this vehicle was single ended (i.e. had only one set of driving controls) and had to be turned at the end of each trip. The other four had driving controls at each end. Seating for passengers was provided in standard bus type seats. As a pay bus the vehicle was fitted with a safe for the wages, tables and chairs for the paymaster, a passengers' seat on the left side of the engine cowling, and the drivers seat about one third of the way along the car.

=== Condition ===
As at 5 June 2003, for a museum exhibit, this vehicle is in extremely poor physical condition. The body shows signs of neglect with panel damage and rust evident. The interior appears never to have had any remedial work carried out. The old linoleum on the floor and the paymaster's table has deteriorated to a stage where it needs to be replaced. The seats are in poor condition, being torn with stuffing hanging out. Parts of the floor have been removed, possibly for repair, but no evidence of any repair is to be seen. Interior paneling is coming adrift and the light fittings have been removed or taken off the vehicle. The front windscreens have been removed and covered with a hessian type material which allows water to leak into the car. At the front left hand side rust is starting to appear on the dashboard.

=== Archaeological potential is high ===
The integrity of this vehicle is high provided it is recovered and correctly restored for display in a suitable museum.

=== Modifications and dates ===
The following modifications have been made to the railbus:

- 1937 Entered service as 17 seat rail bus
- 1938 Converted to rail pay bus
- 1942 Ownership assumed by Mechanical Branch in lieu of Road Motor Section
- 1949 Caught in Maitland Floods and completely submerged
- 1964 Ford Thames V8 petrol engine replaced the original Ford V8 Mercury petrol engine
- 1968 Declared surplus by Railway Department
- 1969 Handed over to Rail Transport Museum at Thirlmere

== Heritage listing ==
As at 29 July 2005, Pay Bus FP 1 is of state significance because it demonstrates the application of the emerging road bus concept to rail transport, in attempting to provide a passenger service on branch lines where more conventional rail transport was uneconomic. When this use was short-lived, FP 1 and its sisters of the first group of rail buses were successfully adapted for service in paying wages all over the state, initiating a system which remained in use for 50 years, and demonstrating considerable social significance in the context of the large number of Railways personnel stationed at remote locations. As well as its social significance, Pay Bus FP 1 is significant historically, aesthetically and technically in the creative adaptation to rail use of road vehicle styling, coach-building and technology.

Rail Paybus FP1 was listed on the New South Wales State Heritage Register on 26 September 2003 having satisfied the following criteria.

The place is important in demonstrating the course, or pattern, of cultural or natural history in New South Wales.

As the leader of the first group of rail buses, FP1 is historically significant because it demonstrates the application of the emerging road bus concept to rail transport, to provide a passenger service on branch lines where the level of patronage did not justify a conventional passenger or mixed train, or a rail motor. When this experiment proved to be less than successful, the adaptation of these units for service as a pay bus, a use which continued for 50 years until overtaken by more modern methods of paying wages to remotely stationed personnel, is also highly significant historically. In this context, FP1 is very much representative, while as the only survivor of the original group, it is also extremely rare.

The place is important in demonstrating aesthetic characteristics and/or a high degree of creative or technical achievement in New South Wales.

FP1 and its sisters display aesthetic and creative significance in the adaptation of the coach-building techniques and appearance of contemporary road buses to rail transport. Although the various members of the class differed slightly in appearance, their design origin was unmistakably rooted in the road bus of the 1930s. FP1 probably displays this characteristic more than any of the others. Certainly they looked nothing like other railway vehicles. Early paint schemes emphasised the road bus origins, with attractive two-tone livery, initially using swooping curves very much in the manner of the period and now generally seen as typical of the art deco style. Road buses even up to the 1950s and 1960s were frequently painted in similar style. Again, FP1 is both representative and rare.

The place has a strong or special association with a particular community or cultural group in New South Wales for social, cultural or spiritual reasons.

The first rail buses also have obvious social significance, in the first instance because of their importance in attempting to provide a passenger service where more conventional rail transport was uneconomic. However given that this use was short-lived, the reallocation of these vehicles as pay buses, allowing substantial and enduring changes and efficiencies in the way Railway staff were paid, is the more significant. The Railways were an important element of life in most parts of rural NSW, with Railway employees and their families representing a significant proportion of the community - indeed the NSW Government Railways were the largest employer in Australia. The periodic arrival of the pay bus at a town where Railway staff were employed was also a significant social event. In this context, and especially as this same method of payment of wages to remote staff continued through a further generation of pay bus, spanning a total period of some 50 years, FP1 can be said to be representative.

The place has potential to yield information that will contribute to an understanding of the cultural or natural history of New South Wales.

There is considerable significance in the adaptation of road bus technology to rail transport, displayed by this first group of rail buses in particular. Both mechanically and as examples of coach-building, these vehicles are pure road bus, with the necessary adaptation to fit them for rail use confined to the mechanical aspects only – virtually only the wheels. Again under this heading, FP1 is both representative and rare.

The place possesses uncommon, rare or endangered aspects of the cultural or natural history of New South Wales.

Extremely rare. This is the only known example of a pre-war rail bus in existence.

The place is important in demonstrating the principal characteristics of a class of cultural or natural places/environments in New South Wales.

This is the only State Rail owned rail bus/pay bus extant. It is a good representation of adaptive use of other technologies applied to a railway situation and a re-use of a vehicle that was not satisfactory in its original role, but was successful in another.

== See also ==
- NSW Rail Museum
- List of transport museums
- NSWGR steam locomotive classification
