= Bickley Vale =

- Suburb
- Interactive map of Bickley Vale
- Country: Australia
- State: New South Wales
- Region: Macarthur
- City: Sydney
- LGA: Camden Council
- Location: 73 km (45 mi) SW of Sydney CBD

Government
  - State electorate: Camden
  - Federal division: Macarthur
- Elevation: 90 m (300 ft)
- Postcode: 2570
Suburbs around Bickley Vale
Brownlow Hill	Grasmere	Camden
Mount Hunter	Bickley Vale	Cawdor
Mount Hunter	Cawdor	Cawdor

Bickley Vale is a suburb of the Macarthur Region of Sydney in the state of New South Wales, Australia in Camden Council.

== History ==
The area now known as Bickley Vale was originally home to the Gandangara people of the Southern Highlands although the Muringong, southernmost of the Darug people, were also known to inhabit the area. In 1805, wool pioneer John Macarthur was granted 5,000 acres (20 km^{2}) at Cowpastures (now Camden). The name was taken from the name of a property located within the suburb. Bickley Vale is still primarily a rural locality.

== Politics ==
Bickley Vale lies in the south ward of Camden Council, currently represented by Mayor Ashleigh Cagney. It sits within the state electorate of Camden, represented by Labor's Geoff Corrigan, the former Mayor of Camden, and the federal electorate of Macarthur, represented by Liberal's Pat Farmer, the former ultra-marathon runner.
