= Werombi, New South Wales =

Werombi New South Wales
- Coordinates: 33°58′54″S 150°35′05″E
- Population: 708 (2016 census)
- Postcode(s): 2570
- Elevation: 260 m (853 ft)
- Location: 80 km (50 mi) WSW of Sydney
- LGA(s): Wollondilly Shire
- Region: Macarthur
- State electorate(s): Wollondilly
- Federal division(s): Hume
Localities around Werombi:
Blue Mountains National Park	Silverdale	Greendale
Blue Mountains National Park	Werombi	Cobbitty
Blue Mountains National Park	Orangeville	Theresa Park

Werombi is a scattered village in the Macarthur Region of New South Wales, Australia, in the Wollondilly Shire. At the 2016 census, Werombi had a population of 930.
