= Burragorang =

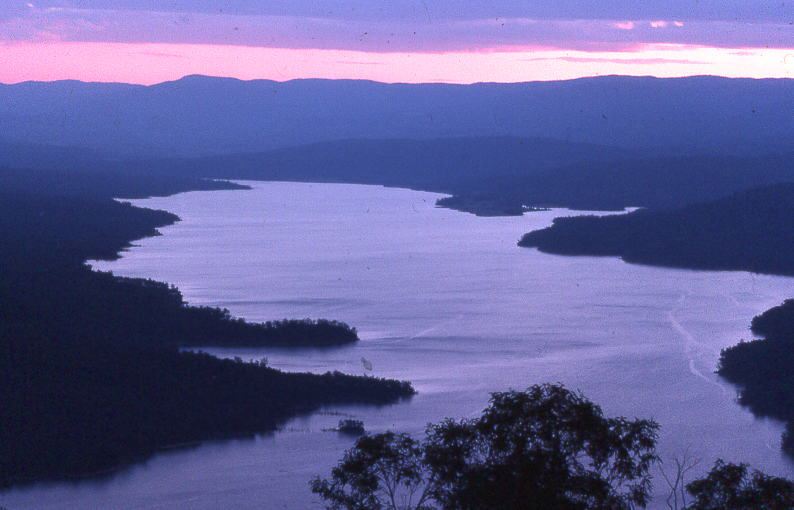
- View of the Burragorang Valley

- Coordinates: 34°0′S 150°26′E
- Country: Australia
- State: New South Wales
- Region: Macarthur
- LGA: Wollondilly Shire

Burragorang or Burragorang Valley is a locality in the Macarthur Region of New South Wales, Australia, in Wollondilly Shire. It is home to Lake Burragorang, which is impounded by Warragamba Dam. It is partially encompassed by Blue Mountains National Park and Nattai National Park.

== History ==
For thousands of years before British colonisation, the Burragorang area was inhabited by the Gandangara (or Gundagurra) people, who lived in the Blue Mountains and Southern Highlands region of New South Wales.

In 1827, European graziers entered Burragorang with John Lacey being one of the first to take up land. Irish Catholic emancipist farmers like Patrick Carlon later settled in the valley during the 19th century. In 1877, a Catholic mission called St Joseph's was established to house and employ the remnant local Gandangara people.

Coal mining commenced in 1878 and, up to the 1960s, the area was a major supplier of coal. Lead and silver were also mined in the valley until about 1927.

With the boom in Sydney's population after World War II, the Warragamba Dam was constructed between 1948 and 1960 on the Warragamba River, inundating the Burragorang Valley, creating Lake Burragorang. Consequently, the town of Burragorang and others like it in the valley were lost under water.

The area around Burragorang and Nattai had been home to numerous collieries from the 1920s to the 1990s, such as the Nattai-Bulli, Oakleigh, Wollondlly, Nattai North and Valley collieries. It is estimated 72 million tonnes of coal was mined in the Burragorang-Nattai region. The area also had deposits of oil shale, and some mining of shale occurred.

The ABC programme, A Drowned Valley, by ABC Open producer, Sean O'Brien, documented former residents' memories of living in the valley before its inundation.

== Attractions ==
The Burragorang Valley has some scenic lookouts over the valley and lake.

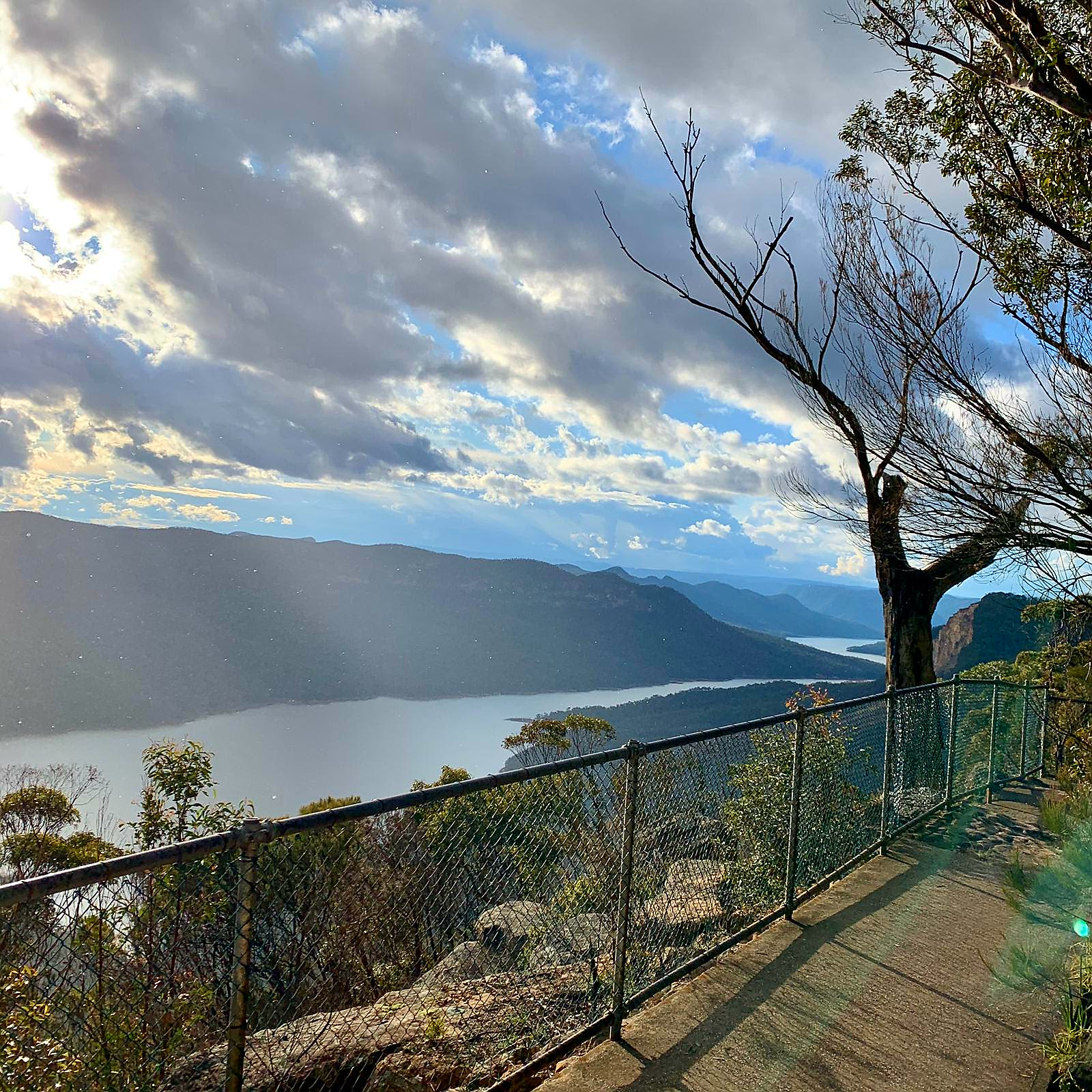
The beauty of Burragorang area is slowly re-emerging after the 2019-20 bushfires. Burragorang Lookout, July 2020

== Etymology ==
The name Burragorang derives from the language of the indigenous Gandangara people, perhaps from the word "burro", which means "kangaroo", or perhaps from "booroon", which means "small animal", and the word "gang", which means to hunt. Therefore, Burragorang is believed to mean "place to hunt kangaroo" or "place to hunt small animals".

However, another reference claims that Burragorang is a Gandangara word which means "home or place of the giant Kangaroo". In a Gandangara creation story, two gods (bulla bulan) pursued a giant kangaroo down the Wollondilly River where it hid in a waterhole creating the Burragorang Valley. The name Burragorang is derived from Burrubug garabang meaning "the great kangaroo's place" (of escape).

According to indigenous academic Cheryl Kickett-Tucker, in Dharawal law, the Burra'gorang is a giant monster which was defeated only with the unity of all the surrounding clans alongside the aid of the powerful Spirit Woman.
