= Warragamba Dam - Haviland Park =

Warragamba Dam – Haviland Park
- Location within New South Wales Location within Australia
- 33°53′13″S 150°35′55″E
- Location: Warragamba Dam, Warragamba, Wollondilly Shire, New South Wales, Australia

Site notes
- Owner: Water NSW

New South Wales Heritage Register
- Official name: Warragamba Dam – Haviland Park
- Type: State heritage (landscape)
- Designated: 18 November 1999
- Reference no.: 1375
- Type: Reserve
- Category: Parks, Gardens and Trees

Warragamba Dam – Haviland Park is a heritage-listed former farm, dam, timber getting, Gundungurra traditional lands and squatter's land and now parkland located at Warragamba Dam in the south-western Sydney settlement of Warragamba in the Wollondilly Shire local government area of New South Wales, Australia. The property is owned by Water NSW, an agency of the Government of New South Wales. It was added to the New South Wales State Heritage Register on 18 November 1999.

== History ==
One of the first places in the Gundungurra traditional homelands that most appealed to the Anglo-Celt settlers were the river flats of the Burragorang Valley (now flooded under Warragamba Dam). Even before the valley was officially surveyed in 1827-8, many early settlers were already squatting on blocks that they planned to officially occupy following the issue of freehold title grants. From the Burragorang Valley and using Aboriginal pathways, other valleys to the west were occupied and developed by the settlers with construction of outstations and stock routes. These cattle entrepreneurs were then followed by cedar-wood extractors and miners.

The Gundungurra traditional owners resisted the taking of their lands, and, relying on various laws of the colony at the time, continually applied for official ownership. Although their individual claims failed, in some kind of recognition of the significance of the designated tracts of land claimed, six Aboriginal reserves (under the control of the NSW Aborigines Protection Board) were formally declared in the Burragorang Valley. Even after these reserves were revoked, many of the traditional owners remained, quietly refusing to leave their traditional homelands.

Finally pushed into the "Gully", a fringe development in West Katoomba from about 1894, the Gully community stayed together for more than 60 years until dispossessed of the Gully by the then Blue Mountains Shire Council so a group of local businessmen could develop a speedway that became known as the Catalina Race Track. The Gully people kept talking about areas of land they had walked in as children - the nearby Megalong and Kanimbla Valleys and the Burragorang Valley. They knew of the profound significance of these valleys for their parents and grandparents.

=== Warragamba Dam ===
Warragamba Dam was constructed from 1947 to 1960, along with adjacent Warragamba township, by the Metropolitan Water Sewerage and Drainage Board; with its own forces with various items being let on contract. Constructed of mass concrete in block sections, a total of two point seven billion tonnes; two point seven billion long tons (three billion short tons) of concrete was used to construct the straight gravity wall which featured a height of 137 metres (449 ft) from foundation to crest.

During the 1960s the public facilities and picnic areas were developed and finalised. Haviland Park was formed out of the original dam construction site and platforms on the eastern bank of the dam, with development, part of the beautification program, essentially undertaken in the early 1960s.

Haviland Park was officially opened by the president of the Metropolitan Water Sewerage and Drainage Board, E. J. Walder, in December 1965. The name commemorates the role of President Haviland, Associate Professor of Architecture at the University of Sydney, who was consulted on the design of the parks at Warragamba. Part of these beautification works involved the removal of much of the dam's construction and plant equipment and establishment of a planned landscape feature for use by the general public. In a design sense, Haviland Park is the most formal of the parks at Warragamba.

Generally, landscaping as part of public facilities was provided at Cataract, Cordeaux and Avon, Nepean and Wornora dams and the Prospect Reservoir. They all contained similar features, e.g., the provision of picnic areas with hot water, barbeques and wood provided, seats and tables, lawns, shade trees, shelters, rubbish disposal points, and toilet facilities. The landscaping tended to mirror the construction phase of the Dam. Haviland Park for instance contains numerous archaeological, architectural and engineering remains, which show evidence of various construction phases. It is believed that several of the exotic species (Japonica, Weeping Wisteria, and Bauhinias) were transplanted from the maintenance area at the main weir because they were highly valued by the workers.

The park area was once again used as a construction site, during the 1998-2004 construction of the auxiliary spillway to reduce the impacts of flooding, the required location and configuration of which has resulted in the reduction of the size of Haviland Park by about a third.

The precinct has been closed since 1997 due to major construction works at the site – construction of the auxiliary spillway.

The provision of picnic areas, hot water, barbecues, seats and tables, lawns, shade trees, rubbish disposal points and toilet facilities was similar to that provided by the board at other dam sites in New South Wales. Some 10-hectare (25-acre) of picnic grounds were landscaped to include visitor facilities such as an oval, running tracks, tennis courts, picnic shelters, electric BBQs, boiling water outlets, group shelters and a kiosk.

On completion the area, located to the south of the dam wall, consisted of a ridge between Lavender Creek and Folly Creek divided by a series of roadways and car parks which provided viewing access to the dam and a recreational park for visitors.

The principal feature of the park was a double avenue of sweet gum (Liquidambar styraciflua) trees along the access of the ridge punctuated by cross roads and featuring a weather shelter and a fountain design by Spooner. Around the perimeter of the park several buildings and facilities original to the dam construction were retained.

In June 2016 the NSW Government announced that it would allocate $58 million to raise the dam wall by 14 metres (46 ft) to prevent flooding disaster to downstream towns.

== Description ==
Wraragamba Dam is located in a narrow gorge within the Warragamba River, approximately 65 kilometres (40 mi) south-west of Sydney and 15 kilometres (9.3 mi) south of Penrith. The south-eastern corner of the site connects to the Warragamba township established as part of the Warragamba Supply Scheme. The northern side of the dam is adjacent to the Blue Mountains National Park. East of the dam is a large entry precinct and picnic grounds, and Haviland Park is between this precinct and the dam itself and spillways.

Haviland Park is to the dam's east and covers 4.0 hectares (10 acres) contains plantings and built features which are substantially intact from the time of establishment in the 1960s. There is remnant evidence of the construction apparatus, including rail tracks, building footings, concrete anchors, former aggregate conveyor tunnel, existing terraced road alignments, 17-tonne; 17-long-ton (19-short-ton) cableway and associated machinery. The existing timber and fibro systems office (former engineers office) and information centre (former staff mess) which constitute the only two remaining buildings from the original construction site.

Haviland Park now comprises two open, relatively level grassed areas bounded by native and introduced trees and shrubs. The most prominent are two rows of sweet gums (Liquidambar styraciflua) planted during the 1960s. The areas are bounded by access roads with newly formed car parking areas and kerbs also provided. The precinct is the major open space recreation area of the dam but has been closed since 1997 due to construction works at the site.

Haviland Park covers an area of 10 acres contains plantings and built features which are substantially intact from the time of establishment. There is remnant evidence of the construction apparatus, including rail tracks, building footings, concrete anchors, former aggregate conveyor tunnel, existing terraced road alignments, 19 ton cableway and associated machinery.

The tree lined avenue of exotic and indigenous plantings includes; coastal redwood (Sequoia sempervirens), Chinese tallow tree (Sapium sabiferum), brush box (Lophostemon confertus), sweet gum (Liquidambar styraciflua), paperbark (Melaleuca sp.), Jacaranda, camphor laurel (Cinnamomum camphora), plus major species of Monterey pine (Pinus radiata), Eucalypt, and she-oak (Casuarina sp.).

The site is surrounded by a dry packed stone retaining wall. A landscaped exotic garden and steps adjacent to the existing picnic shelter to the north. This garden contains significant plantings, in this instance of Cacti, Agave, succulents, and Yuccas. Access is provided to the Folly Creek area.

The facilities available for public use include, parking areas, viewing points, picnic areas with tables and seats, barbeque fireplaces, with wood provided, boiling water installations, children's playgrounds, shelter sheds, public toilets, and drinking fountains. The existing timber and fibro systems office (former engineers office) and information centre (former staff mess) which constitute the only two remaining buildings from the original construction site.

=== Modifications and dates ===
- 1947-60: construction of Warragamba Dam and village, support and work facilities for dam workers.
- 1965: beautification works – Haviland Park was established, including avenue of trees, fountain and weather shelter. Haviland Park (4 ha) is a landscaped area located on the site of much of the dam's original construction plant and equipment. It was developed following the completion of the dam structure to a design, which involved Peter Spooner (Associate Professor of Architecture, University of NSW) and opened in December 1965.
- 1970s: new chlorination plant and pumping station built.
- 1985–90: program of works to upgrade the dam: the wall was raised and the structure strengthened.
- 1999–2004: construction of the auxiliary spillway involved excavation of the northern section (c. a third) of the park including removal of numerous roads, car parks and some of the landscaped area. The park was closed to the public during construction and has since undergone rehabilitation in accordance with the master plan. This has involved re-alignment and replacement of many of the roads at the northern end. At the site of the proposed visitors centre only the landform survives, now with a sheer sandstone cutting overlooking the new spillway. A public platform and lookout was built on the eastern side of the gorge downstream of the dam with access from the Warragamba township.
- 2001: bushfires destroyed several buildings including the weather shelter in Haviland Park, the community relations office, the works depot area and sheds, suspension bridge, theatrette and vegetation throughout the site.
- 2002–present (2008): a master plan for Warragamba Dam's redevelopment was proposed and is being progressively implemented. This involved a new visitors' centre (currently under construction), SCA office and new maintenance buildings. The destroyed community relations office, still extant kiosk and group shelters were demolished.

A survey of the features in the park was carried out for the 2006 Conservation Management Plan (CMP). No features of note were recorded in the area proposed for the new Visitor Centre.

To the west, down the side of the ridge, are the remains of two former roads, now truncated at their northern end.

To the south of the site the principal site features are:

- The road pattern
- Double avenue of sweet gum trees (Liquidambar styraciflua)
- Fountain (not in use, base only survives)

Towards the east side other trees, including Melaleucas and pines are extant.

== Heritage listing ==
Haviland Park has a high level of state heritage significance for several reasons. It represents the pinnacle of quality visitor facilities provided by the Board at Dam sites. It contains numerous archaeological, architectural and engineering remnants from the dam's construction. The Park displays a high degree of formality and planning and is rich in both exotic and native botanical species which contribute to the landscape significance of the park. It commemorates the role of Haviland, without whom the numerous landscaped parks and reserves of the Dams would not have been established, nor executed with such high regard for design and formalism. It is highly valued by the community of New South Wales as a place for passive recreation, leisure activities and sightseeing pursuits. Sydney Water continues the role of maintaining Haviland Park and providing visitor facilities.

Warragamba Dam - Haviland Park was listed on the New South Wales State Heritage Register on 18 November 1999 having satisfied the following criteria.

The place possesses uncommon, rare or endangered aspects of the cultural or natural history of New South Wales.

This item is assessed as aesthetically rare statewide. This item is assessed as historically rare statewide. This item is assessed as scientifically rare statewide. This item is assessed as socially rare statewide.

== See also ==
- Upper Nepean Scheme
