= Mowbray Park, New South Wales =

Mowbray Park
- Town
- Coordinates: 34°9′13″S 150°33′12″E
- Country: Australia
- State: New South Wales
- Region: Macarthur
- LGA: Wollondilly Shire
- Location: 91 km (57 mi) WSW of Sydney CBD; 42 km (26 mi) N of Mittagong

Government
  - State electorate: Wollondilly
  - Federal division: Hume
- Elevation: 355 m (1,165 ft)

Population
  - Total: 94 (SAL 2021)
- Postcode: 2571
Localities around Mowbray Park
Oakdale	The Oaks	Mount Hunter
Nattai	Mowbray Park	Picton
Lakesland	Thirlmere	Thirlmere

Mowbray Park is a small village in the Macarthur Region of New South Wales, Australia, in the Wollondilly Shire.
