= Oakdale, New South Wales =

Oakdale
- Town
- Coordinates: 34°04′54″S 150°30′04″E
- Country: Australia
- State: New South Wales
- LGA: Wollondilly Shire
- Location: 86 km (53 mi) WSW of Sydney CBD; 53 km (33 mi) N of Mittagong

Government
  - State electorate: Wollondilly
  - Federal division: Hume
- Elevation: 430 m (1,410 ft)

Population
  - Total: 2,028 (2021 census)
- Postcode: 2570
Localities around Oakdale
| Blue Mountains National Park | Blue Mountains National Park | Orangeville |
| Nattai | Oakdale | Belimbla Park |
| Nattai | Mowbray Park | Mowbray Park |

Oakdale is a semi-rural suburb or district in Wollondilly Shire in Sydney's southwest in New South Wales, Australia. At the 2021 census, Oakdale had a population of 2,028.

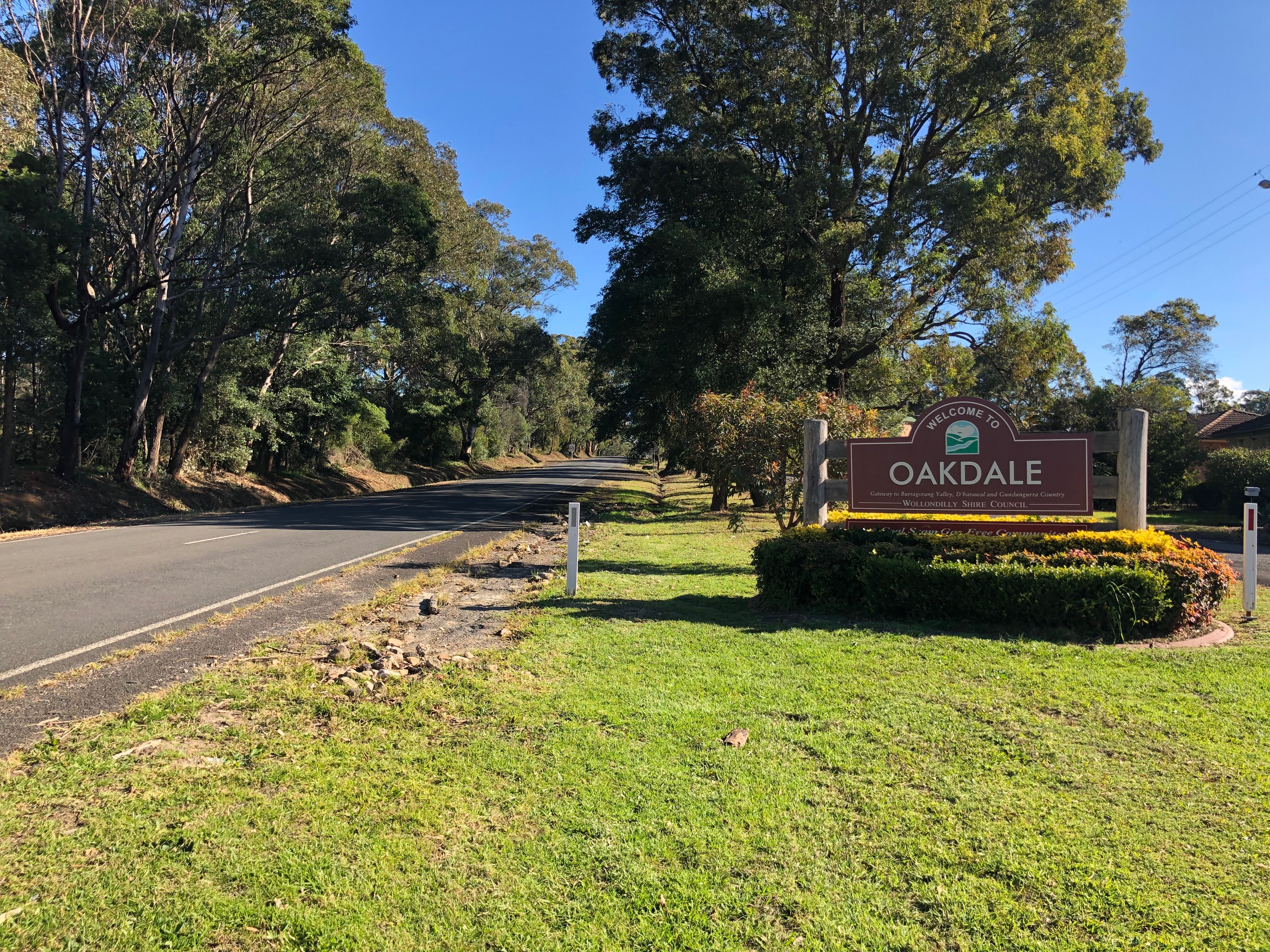
Oakdale
