= Glenmore, New South Wales =

Glenmore New South Wales
- Coordinates: 34°3′41″S 150°35′42″E
- Population: 108 (SAL 2021)
- Postcode(s): 2570
- Elevation: 189 m (620 ft)
- Location: 77 km (48 mi) WSW of Sydney CBD; 66 km (41 mi) N of Mittagong
- LGA(s): Wollondilly Shire
- Region: Macarthur
- State electorate(s): Wollondilly
- Federal division(s): Hume
Localities around Glenmore:
Orangeville	Theresa Park	Brownlow Hill
The Oaks	Glenmore	Bickley Vale
The Oaks	Mount Hunter	Mount Hunter

Glenmore is a small village in the Macarthur Region of New South Wales, Australia, in the Wollondilly Shire.
