= Theresa Park, New South Wales =

Theresa Park
- Suburb
- Coordinates: 33°59′32″S 150°38′13″E
- Country: Australia
- State: New South Wales
- City: Sydney
- LGA: Wollondilly Shire
- Location: 76 km (47 mi) WSW of Sydney CBD

Government
  - State electorate: Wollondilly
  - Federal division: Hume
- Elevation: 78 m (256 ft)

Population
  - Total: 535 (2016 census)
- Postcode: 2570
Suburbs around Theresa Park
Silverdale	Greendale	Bringelly
Werombi	Theresa Park	Cobbitty
Orangeville	Glenmore	Cobbitty

Theresa Park is a suburb of Sydney in the Wollondilly Shire local government area in the state of New South Wales, Australia.

== History ==
Before 1860 the area was spelt Teresa Park. The land was part of a large grant to John Terry Hughes.
