= Nattai, New South Wales =

Nattai
- Town
- Coordinates: 34°4′8″S 150°26′53″E
- Country: Australia
- State: New South Wales
- Region: Macarthur
- LGA: Wollondilly Shire
- Location: 93 km (58 mi) WSW of Sydney CBD; 60 km (37 mi) N of Mittagong

Government
  - State electorate: Wollondilly
  - Federal division: Hume
- Elevation: 556 m (1,824 ft)

Population
  - Total: 77 (SAL 2021)
- Postcode: 2570
Localities around Nattai
Blue Mountains National Park	Blue Mountains National Park	Blue Mountains National Park
Blue Mountains National Park	Nattai	Oakdale
Blue Mountains National Park	Blue Mountains National Park	Mowbray Park

Nattai is a small village in the Macarthur Region of New South Wales, Australia, in the Wollondilly Shire. The area around Burragorang and Nattai was home to numerous collieries from the 1920s to the 1990s, such as the Nattai-Bulli, Oakleigh, Wollondlly, Nattai North and Valley collieries. It is estimated 72 million tonnes of coal was mined in the Burragorang-Nattai region (NSW Mines Department records).

ZEN Energy is proposing to turn degraded coal industry land at Nattai on the escarpment above the Burragorang Lake into a 1,000 megawatts (1GW) Western Sydney Pumped Hydro project capable of supplying up to eight continuous hours of 'firming' energy, essential to stabilise the state's electricity grid.
