= Mount Hunter, New South Wales =

Coordinates: 34°04′S 150°38′E

Mount Hunter
- Town
- Country: Australia
- State: New South Wales
- Region: Macarthur
- LGA: Wollondilly Shire, Camden Council
- Location: 79 km (49 mi) from Sydney CBD; 66 km (41 mi) from Mittagong

Government
  - State electorate: Camden
  - Federal division: Hume
- Elevation: 138 m (453 ft)

Population
  - Total: 732 (2016 census)
- Postcode: 2570
Localities around Mount Hunter
The Oaks	Glenmore	Bickley Vale
The Oaks	Mount Hunter	Cawdor
Mowbray Park	Picton	Razorback

Mount Hunter is a rural town in the Macarthur Region of New South Wales, Australia. A large portion of the area is within the Wollondilly Shire and the rest is located within Camden Council. As of the 2016 census, Mount Hunter had a population of 732.
