= Cawdor, New South Wales =

Cawdor
- Town
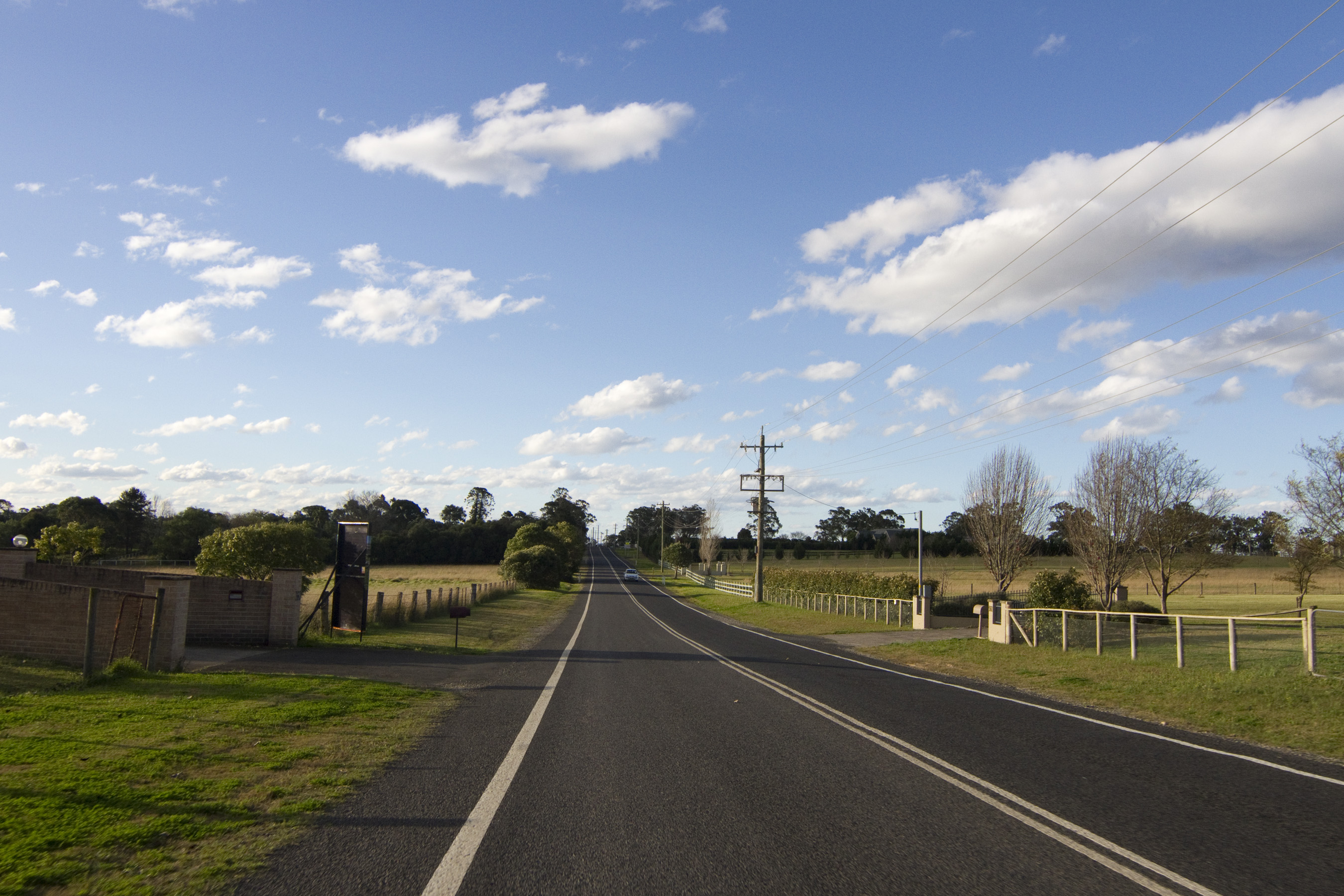
- Cawdor NSW 2570, Australia

- Coordinates: 34°05′S 150°41′E
- Country: Australia
- State: New South Wales
- LGAs: Wollondilly Shire; Camden Council
- Location: 6 km (3.7 mi) from Camden; 12 km (7.5 mi) from Picton; 74 km (46 mi) from Sydney; 58 km (36 mi) from Mittagong

Government
  - State electorates: Wollondilly; Camden
  - Federal divisions: Hume; Macarthur
- Elevation: 98 m (322 ft)

Population
  - Total: 430 (2021 census)
- Postcode: 2570
Localities around Cawdor
| Mount Hunter | Bickley Vale | Camden Park |
| Mount Hunter | Cawdor | Menangle |
| Razorback | Razorback | Douglas Park |

Cawdor is a village of Wollondilly Shire, in the state of New South Wales, Australia. Part of the locality of Cawdor lies within Camden Council.

== Population ==
At the 2021 census, the population of Cawdor was 430. 84.4% were born in Australia and 91.4% spoke only English at home. The most common religious affiliations were Catholic 39.1% and Anglican 22.8%.
