= Cobbitty =

- Suburb
- Interactive map of Cobbitty
- Coordinates: 34°01′S 150°41′E
- Country: Australia
- State: New South Wales
- Region: Macarthur
- City: Sydney
- LGA: Camden Council
- Location: 70 km (43 mi) SW of Sydney CBD

Government
  - State electorates: Camden; Badgerys Creek
  - Federal division: Hume
- Elevation: 102 m (335 ft)

Population
  - Total: 4,206 (2021 census)
- Postcode: 2570
Suburbs around Cobbitty
Greendale	Bringelly	Oran Park
Theresa Park	Cobbitty	Harrington Park
Brownlow Hill	Camden	Kirkham

Cobbitty is a semi-rural town of the Macarthur Region near the town of Camden, southwest of Sydney, in the state of New South Wales, Australia. The area is mostly farmland with a population of just over 4,000.

== Overview ==
The area is mostly farmland and agricultural. At the southern end of the suburb, bordering the Nepean River is Camden Airport, a site for gliding and skydiving. The main road, Cobbitty Road, is home to "Cobbitty Primary School", a general store, a small cafe, and "Teen Ranch". Teen Ranch is a Christian organisation that runs school and holiday programs for teens.

Cobbitty is home to a New South Wales Rural Fire Service brigade. The brigade has two trucks and is often called upon for incidents both within and outside of the district. The brigade has currently 40 members, and is active throughout the year, not just during bushfire season.

The area has views over the township of Camden.

== Education ==
Macarthur Anglican School is in Cobbitty.

== History ==
The area now known as Cobbitty was originally home to the Muringong, southernmost of the Darug people. The wider area became known as Cowpastures by early British settlers following the discovery in 1795 of a herd of cows that had escaped from the main colony grazing there. The discovery encouraged prospective farmers that the land was good grazing land, including John Macarthur at his Camden Park Estate just south of Cobbitty, followed by explorer Gregory Blaxland who named his farm Cubbady Farm, which was based on an aboriginal word. The spelling of the name evolved into Cobbitty.

Cobbitty Post Office opened on 1 May 1869 and closed in 1993.

== Heritage listings ==
Cobbitty has a number of heritage-listed sites, including:

- 421 The Northern Road: Denbigh, Cobbitty

== Demographics ==
At the 2021 census, Cobbitty had a population of 4,206 people. A large proportion (79.3%) of these people were born in Australia, with other common countries of birth being England (3.4%), New Zealand (1.1%), Philippines (0.8%), China (0.6%) and India (0.6%). 83.6% of people only spoke English at home. The most common responses for religion in Cobbitty were Catholic (35.2%), No Religion (25.3%), and Anglican (18.0%).

== Politics ==
Cobbitty is part of the north ward of Camden Council represented by Lara Symkowiak and Usha Dommaraju (both Liberals) and Cindy Cagney of the Labor Party. The suburb is in the federal electorate of Hume, represented by Angus Taylor (Liberal), and the state electorate of Camden, held by Sally Quinnell of the Labor Party.

== Notable people ==
- Eliza Marsden Hassall - philanthropist
