= New South Wales Mounted Brigade =

- Active: 1893–??
- Country: New South Wales
- Allegiance: British Empire
- Type: Mounted infantry
- Engagements: Second Boer War

The New South Wales Mounted Brigade was a mounted infantry brigade of the Colony of New South Wales.

== History ==
The brigade was formed on 1 August 1893, consisting of the New South Wales Cavalry (Lancers) and the New South Wales Mounted Rifles. The brigade expanded in 1897 with the addition of the 1st Australian Horse.

== Structure ==
At formation in 1893, the brigade had the following structure:

New South Wales Cavalry (Lancers)
Commanding Officer: (vacant), Adjutant: Captain George Leonard Lee

- 1st Squadron – Commanding Officer: Captain Alexander James Dodds
  - Sydney
  - Parramatta
- 2nd Squadron – Commanding Officer: Captain John J. Walters
  - Illawarra
  - West Camden
- 3rd Squadron – Commanding Officer: Captain W. Cracknell
  - Hunter River
- 4th Squadron – Commanding Officer: Captain C.E. Taylor
  - Lismore
  - Richmond River

New South Wales Mounted Rifles
Commanding Officer: Major Harry Lassetter – Adjutant: Captain Henry Glendower Bodysham Sparrow

- 1st Company – Commanding Officer: Captain A.F. Lloyd
  - Liverpool
  - Campbelltown
- 2nd Company – Commanding Officer: Captain John Macquarie Antill
  - Picton
  - Camden
- 3rd Company – Commanding Officer: Captain Frederick Bland
  - Bega
  - Queanbeyan
- 4th Company – Commanding Officer: Captain Charles Henry Edward Chauvel
  - Tenterfield
  - Inverell

The structure of the 1st Australian Horse added to the brigade in 1897, was as follows:

1st Australian Horse
Commanding Officer: Captain Kenneth Mackay – Adjutant: Lieutenant R. R. Thompson

- A squadron
  - Murrumburrah
  - Cootamundra
  - Gundagai
- B squadron
  - Goulburn
  - Braidwood-Araluen
  - Michelago-Bredbo
  - Bungendore
- C squadron
  - Mudgee
  - Rylstone
  - Lue
- D squadron
  - Scone
  - Belltrees
  - Muswellbrook
- E squadron
  - Armidale
  - Tamworth
  - Gunnedah
  - Boggabri

== Commanding officer ==
- Macdonald, Malcolm Melville
