= Historic bridges of New South Wales =

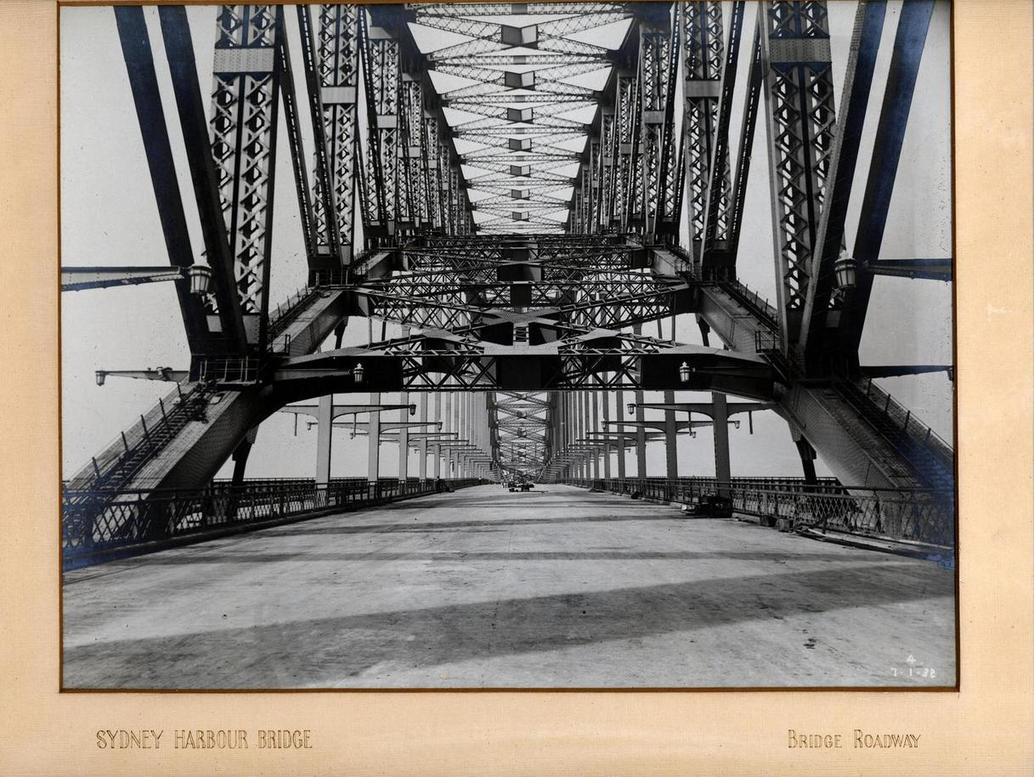
Sydney Harbour Bridge

This list documents historical bridges located in New South Wales, Australia. Road, rail and pedestrian bridges are listed. Generally bridges built before World War II (1939) have been included in this list.

== Historical context ==
Bridge construction in New South Wales started with the needs of the first settlers and continues through to the present day with advanced bridge design. The infant colony had limited expertise and limited materials. As time passed, techniques and materials were developed that allowed greater spans to be crossed and therefore expansion of the colony into otherwise inaccessible areas.

The NSW Public Works Department was under pressure from a cash strapped government to produce as much road and bridge work for as little cost as possible. The cheapest bridge was the timber truss which could be built with local timber.

All bridges are unique in the sense that the bridges were built using various technology, expertise, or materials or how they gained access to an area.

For example, at the time of early settlement, (1788 onwards) NSW was very isolated from the technological advances being developed in Europe and North America. Materials such as cast iron were unavailable to early colonial NSW bridge builders. NSW bridge builders had to rely on their own resourcefulness, bred of isolation, distance and the unique environment to make these bridges.

New South Wales's unusual environment, in general, results in unusual, and extreme river flows. This resulted in almost no water flow for most of the year with some flow each year and extreme floods around once a decade. Inland, the environment causes a low pressure system coming over the continent, due to a large high pressure of the Indian Ocean. This often occurs at summer, at which time it causes cyclone season, although it can occur at any time of year (but not inducing cyclones). At the coast, the cause is the "east coast low", which occurs at similar places at the eastern edge of a number continents, and sees the continent's normal high pressure systems becomes one large and stationary system, perhaps due to doldrums over the west coast's ocean. This phenomenon causes the global trade winds deviate, - inducing the low pressures at polar and tropical latitudes to connect along the east coast - producing a trough situation that mimics a tropical monsoon. An east coast low rain event can occur at any time of the year. Early settlers often replaced washed out bridges with a similarly rudimentary structure, only to see it also washed away in a heavy rain event. The government came to see that this was a major problem holding back economic development in New South Wales.

In solving these problems, colonial NSW embraced the innovations produced by others and adapted them successfully to the unique situations presented. There are examples of some fine 19th-century bridge engineering provided for the railway expansion, conceived mainly by British engineers working in the then isolation of the Australian inland. One examples of many of the newer European techniques that were used was the idea of the cable-stayed bridges.

Australia developed around coastal communities with rudimentary road systems to inland settlements. The early years saw early bridge technology limited very much to the 18th-century European technology of masonry arches and cast iron, the latter still in its infancy and not produced to any great extent in New South Wales.

NSW at the time of early settlement had an abundance of convict labour and had a need for rapid construction. In a country heavily timbered this led to basic timber structure bridges but as the colony gained stability, the government looked towards more permanent structures. Furthermore, as the skills for quarrying and stone dressing became available, masonry bridges began to be designed and built. As all metal materials had to be imported, iron bridges were rarely appropriate and were in any case still too novel for colonial application. Iron bridges were only used for major crossings on important corridors.

Timber truss bridges, and timber bridges generally were so common that NSW was known to travellers as the "timber bridge state".

The following list illustrates the development of New South Wales bridge construction techniques. The list commences from the earlier constructions through to the later developments.

== New South Wales historic bridges ==
Sorted by date

=== 19th century ===
| Built | Name | Location | Image | Construction type (materials) | Length | | Use (carries) | In use | Comments | Refs | Coordinates |
| Built | Name | Location | Image | Construction type (materials) | m | ft | Use (carries) | In use | Comments | Refs | Coordinates |
|---|---|---|---|---|---|---|---|---|---|---|---|
| 1832 | Mitchell's Causeway | Mount Victoria | | Causeway: Sydney sandstone | 150 | 492 | Road: Great Western Highway: Motor vehicles | Temporarily closed | Only known surviving stone causeway from the early Colonial period. | | 33°34′55″S 150°13′52″E |
| 1833 | Lennox Bridge | Glenbrook | | Closed-spandrel deck arch: Sydney sandstone | 6 | 20 | Road: Mitchell's Pass: downhill only: Motor vehicles; Pedestrians; Bicycles | Yes | Lennox Bridge is the oldest stone bridge on the Australian mainland. | | 33°45′15″S 150°37′56″E |
| 1836 | Lansdowne Bridge | Lansvale | | Closed-spandrel deck arch: Sydney sandstone | 33.5 | 110 | Road: Hume Highway: Motor vehicles; Pedestrians | Yes | Largest span stone arch bridge in Australia. | | 33°53′24″S 150°58′01″E |
| 1839 | Lennox Bridge | Parramatta | | Closed-spandrel deck arch: Sydney sandstone | 27 | 89 | Road: Church Street: Pedestrians; Parramatta Light Rail | Yes | | | 33°48′39″S 150°00′16″E |
| 1858 | Pyrmont Bridge | Darling Harbour | | Swing bridge: Ironbark timber; Steel central spans | 369 | 1,211 | Road: Pyrmont Bridge Road: Pedestrians; Bicycles only | Yes | At the time of its construction, one of the largest swing spans in the world and it was one of the first to be powered by electricity. | | 33°52′14″S 151°12′02″E |
| 1861 | Glebe Island Bridge | Rozelle Bay | | Viaduct with a small hand-cranked swing-span: Timber beam deck | 319 | 1,045 | Road: 1861-1862 | No | Replaced by Blackbutts Bridge (1862–1903). | | 33°52′06″S 151°11′09″E |
| 1863 | Menangle railway viaduct | Menangle | | Arch viaduct: Timber; Masonry; Wrought iron | 145 | 476 | Rail: Main Southern railway | Yes | Spanning the Nepean River and designed by John Whitton, it is the first large iron railway bridge erected in New South Wales. | | 34°07′05″S 150°44′37″E |
| 1867 | Picton railway viaduct | Picton | | Arch viaduct: Sydney sandstone; Stone rubble | 84 | 276 | Rail: Main Southern railway | Yes | Spanning Stonequarry Creek and designed by John Whitton, it is the oldest arch stone railway bridge erected in New South Wales and the first one built for two tracks. | | 34°10′40″S 150°36′42″E |
| 1867 | Victoria Bridge | Penrith | | Box plate girder: Wrought iron; Steel with reinforced concrete; Sydney sandstone | 181 | 594 | Initially rail: Main Western railway; Now road: Great Western Highway; Motor vehicles; Pedestrians; Bicycles | Yes | Officially, The Nepean Bridge and designed by John Whitton, it is the oldest surviving crossing of the Hawkesbury–Nepean River. | | 33°44′46″S 150°40′54″E |
| 1867 | Knapsack Viaduct | Lapstone | | Arch viaduct: Sydney sandstone | 118 | 387 | Rail: Main Western railway (1867-1892); Road: Great Western Highway (1910-1993); Recreation: Pedestrians only | Yes | Designed by John Whitton, the viaduct was initially part of the Lapstone Zig Zag, subsequently deviated via the Glenbrook Tunnel. | | 33°46′00″S 150°37′00″E |
| 1867 | Prince Alfred Bridge | Gundagai | | Warren truss: Wrought iron; Timber; Cast iron | 921 | 3,022 | Road: Hume Highway (1867-1977); Local traffic: (1977- present.); Iron spans remain in use. Timber spans closed. | Yes | The first iron truss bridge in NSW. Main spans were used for local traffic only, after Hume Highway bypassed Gundagai. Timber spans subsequently declared unsafe for vehicular and pedestrian traffic. | | 35°04′25″S 148°06′26″E |
| 1869 | The Great Zig Zag | Clarence | | Arch viaducts: Sydney sandstone | 7,000 | 22,966 | Rail: Main Western railway (1869-1910); Rail: Zig Zag Railway (1975-2012) | Yes | Designed by John Whitton, the zig zag was bypassed via the Ten Tunnels Deviation in 1910. Part of the railway line was subsequently used as a narrow gauge tourist railway. | | 33°28′19″S 150°11′43″E |
| 1870 | Bowenfels rail viaduct | Bowenfels | | Arch viaduct: Sydney sandstone; Stone rubble | | | Rail: Main Western railway (1870-1921) | No | The stone viaduct (foreground) was built in 1870; and the brick viaduct (background) completed in 1921 that duplicated the railway line and superseded the 1870 viaduct. | | 33°28′22″S 150°07′38″E |
| 1870 | Marrangaroo railway viaduct | Marrangaroo | | Arch viaduct: Sydney sandstone; Stone rubble | | | Rail: Main Western railway (1870-1921) | No | A single-track stone viaduct was built in 1870; and a double-track brick viaduct completed in 1923 that duplicated the railway line and superseded the 1870 viaduct. | | 33°26′17″S 150°06′44″E |
| 1870 | Denison Bridge | Bathurst | | Steel American Pratt truss | | | Road | Yes | Now pedestrian only | | 33°25′02″S 149°35′31″E |
| 1870 | Mudgee Road Bridge | Wallerawang | | Stone | | | Road | Yes (private) | | | 33°24′47″S 150°05′54″E |
| 1870 | Coxs River Bridge | Wallerawang | | Arch viaduct: Sydney sandstone; Stone rubble | | | Rail: Main Western railway (1870-1923) | No | A single-track stone viaduct was built in 1870; and a double-track brick viaduct completed in 1923 that duplicated the railway line and superseded the 1870 viaduct. | | 33°24′20″S 150°04′59″E |
| 1873 | Hay Bridge | Hay | | Lattice girder swing bridge: Wrought iron; Timber deck; Cast iron | | | Road | No | Demolished when the new road bridge opened in 1973 | | 34°30′59″S 144°50′33″E |
| 1874 | Windsor Bridge | Windsor | | | | | Road | Yes | | | 33°36′11″S 150°49′20″E |
| 1881 | Nowra Bridge | Nowra | | Steel Whipple Truss | 342 | 1,122 | Road | Yes | Closed To Traffic in 2023 Only Walking and Cyclists Only | | 34°51′51″S 150°36′07″E |
| 1881 | Gladesville Bridge (the 1881 bridge) | Drummoyne | | | | | Road | No | Demolished when the new road bridge opened in 1964 | | 33°50′32″S 151°08′35″E |
| 1881 | Dubbo Rail Bridge | Dubbo | | Wrought iron lattice girder bridge | | | Rail | Yes | | | 32°14′38″S 149°35′39″E |
| 1882 | Peel River Bridge | Tamworth | | Iron lattice girder | 3,000 | 914 | Rail | Yes | | | 31°05′06″S 150°55′23″E |
| 1885 | Como Bridge | Como - Oatley spanning the Georges River | | Lattice girder bridge | | | Pedestrian, Viaduct (formerly Rail) | Yes | "The Como Rail Bridge is significant as the longest single track lattice girder bridge in New South Wales and is a rare example of this type Historically, the bridge contributed to the opening up of the southern suburbs of Sydney in the 1880s. While the rail infrastructure has largely been removed from the bridge, it continues to serve an important function, supporting the Woronora to Penshurst Water Supply Pipeline, part of Sydney's fifth water supply system. It also provides an important pedestrian link across the Georges River." | | 33°59′42″S 151°04′15″E |
| 1886 | Three trestles | Main North Line | | Timber Queen post truss viaduct on wooden trestles | | | Rail | No | Three of five bridges built Beardy Waters, Severn River, Bluff River | | 29°38′17″S 151°46′50″E; 29°34′55″S 151°48′09″E; 29°12′01″S 152°01′00″E |
| 1886 | Meadowbank Bridge | Meadowbank | | Truss Bridge | | | Rail | Yes | Now bicycles and pedestrians only. New John Whitton Bridge was built to replace the original bridge in 1980. | | 33°49′19″S 151°05′20″E |
| 1888 | Brewarrina Bridge | Brewarrina | | Wrought iron lift bridge with timber beam approaches | 91 | 299 | Road | Yes | Now pedestrian only | | 29°56′51″S 146°51′48″E |
| 1888 | Mulga Street Bridge | Oatley | | Double stone culvert | | | Road | Yes | Now covered with modern roadwork, the stonework is still visible from Myles Dunphy Reserve. | | 33°58′50″S 151°4′40″E |
| 1888 | Sunnyside | Tenterfield | | Timber Queen post truss viaduct on stone trestles | | | rail | no | Sunnyside rail bridge over Tenterfield Creek | | 28°59′08″S 151°56′58″E |
| 1891 | Murrumbidgee River railway bridge | Wagga Wagga | | Wrought iron lattice truss | | | Rail | No | Removed in 2007 | | 35°6′57″S 147°22′58″E |
| 1892 | Yass Town rail bridge | Yass | | Truss | | | Rail | No | disused | | 34°50′21″S 148°54′22″E |
| 1893 | McKanes Falls Bridge | Lithgow | | McDonald truss | 27 | 89 | Road | Yes | | | 33°32′58″S 150°07′28″E |
| 1895 | Wilcannia Bridge | Wilcannia | | Steel truss bridge | | | Road | No | Accessible to public. Used to carry Barrier Highway and spans over Darling River. | | 31°33′37″S 143°22′47″E |
| 1895 | Tharwa Bridge | Tharwa | | Timber Allan Truss | | | Road | Yes | | | 35°30′31″S 149°04′14″E |
| 1895 | Hampden Bridge | Wagga Wagga | | Timber Allan Truss | 100.5 | 330 | Road | Yes | Closed to public. To be demolished in 2013 | | 35°6′3″S 147°22′7″E |
| 1897 | Victoria Bridge | Picton | | Timber Allan Truss | 80 | 262 | Road | Yes | tallest trestle in NSW | | 34°10′49″S 150°36′38″E |
| 1897 | Wallaby Rocks Bridge (Turon River) | Wallaby Rocks | | Allan timber truss | 106.7 | 350 | Road | Yes | | | 33°04′26″S 149°38′59″E |
| 1898 | Hampden Bridge | Kangaroo Valley | | suspension with sandstone turrets | 80 | 262 | Road | Yes | | | 34°43′40″S 150°31′16″E |
| 1898 | Morpeth Bridge | Morpeth | | Allan truss | 250 | 820 | Road | Yes | | | 32°43′26″S 151°37′36″E |

=== 20th century ===
| Built | Name | Location | Image | Construction type (materials) | Length | | Use (carries) | In use | Comments | Refs | Coordinates |
| Built | Name | Location | Image | Construction type (materials) | m | ft | Use (carries) | In use | Comments | Refs | Coordinates |
|---|---|---|---|---|---|---|---|---|---|---|---|
| 1901 | Hinton Bridge | Hinton | | Allan truss | 178.6 | 586 | Road | Yes | | | 32°42′51″S 151°38′52″E |
| 1901 | De Burghs Bridge (the 1901 bridge) | West Pymble | | | | | Road | No | Replaced by new road bridge in 1967. Old bridge destroyed by bushfires in January 1994 | | 33°46′33″S 151°8′12″E |
| 1902 | Gundagai Rail Bridge | Gundagai | | Timber Howe deck trusses | 819 | 2,687 | Rail | No | over Murrumbidgee River | | 33°04′23″S 148°06′17″E |
| 1902 | Clifford Love Bridge | Lane Cove West | | Steel Arch | 150 | 492 | Great North Walk | yes | over the Lane Cove River | | 33.802902°S 151.143839°E |
| 1903 | St Albans Bridge | St Albans | | DeBurgh timber truss | | | Road | Yes | | | 33°17′39″S 150°58′22″E |
| 1903 | Maldon suspension bridge | Maldon | | | | | Road | No | | | 34°12′08″S 150°37′56″E |
| 1911 | Scabbing Flat Bridge | Dubbo | | Timber Dare-type truss | | | Road | Yes | | | 32°25′50″S 148°48′36″E |
| 1914 | Mungindi Bridge | Mungindi | | Timber Dare-type truss | | | Road | Yes | To be replaced by a new bridge which is under construction | | 28°58′33″S 148°59′05″E |
| 1916 | Rawsonville Bridge | Dubbo | | Timber Dare-type truss | | | Road | Yes | | | 32°11′28″S 148°26′59″E |
| 1918 | Fullers Bridge | Chatswood West | | | | | Road | Yes | | | 33°47′34″S 151°09′25″E |
| 1924 | Mulwala Bridge | Mulwala | | Steel Pratt Truss | | | Road | Yes | | | 36°00′15″S 146°00′15″E |
| 1924 | Roseville Bridge (the 1924 bridge) | Roseville Chase | | | | | Road | No | Replaced by new road bridge in 1966. Used as a pedestrian bridge until it was demolished in 1974. | | 33°46′27″S 151°12′19″E |
| 1927 | Subway Lane bridge | Homebush | | | | | Rail | Yes | | | 33°51′58″S 151°05′03″E |
| 1929 | Tom Uglys Bridge (the 1929 bridge) | Blakehurst | | Truss bridge | 499 | 1,637 | Road | Yes | | | 34°00′12″S 151°06′48″E |
| 1932 | Sydney Harbour Bridge | Sydney | | Steel through arch bridge | | | Road, rail, pedestrian and bicycle | Yes | | | 33°51′29″S 151°12′39″E |
| 1932 | Grafton | Grafton | | Bascule | | | Road (upper deck); Rail (lower deck) | Yes | | | 29°41′53″S 152°56′32″E |
| 1935 | Ryde Bridge (the 1935 bridge) | Ryde | | Lift bridge | | | Road | Yes | | | 33°49′25″S 151°05′42″E |
| 1936 | Kindee Bridge | Kindee | | suspension | 70 | 230 | Road | Yes | Crosses Hastings River near Long Flat | | 31°25′20″S 152°28′13″E |
| 1939 | Long Gully Bridge | Northbridge | | Concrete arch | | | Road | Yes | Rebuilt and replaced the 1892 bridge | | 33°48′59″S 151°12′44″E |

== Allan type truss ==
The Allan truss bridge is named after Percy Allan, a famous Australian engineer who designed this bridge type. His design consisted of vertical and diagonal arrangements comprising a combination of timber and iron elements. The timber elements were designed to be in compression and the iron elements in tension. Allen's design followed extensive testing of Australian hardwoods by Prof. Warren and his early engineering students at Sydney University. The timber used was mostly ironbark because of its high strength. Other features of Allan's truss design included design to minimize later maintenance and/or replacement of elements. For this reason the trusses were built in pairs to facilitate work on a particular element without requiring the whole bridge to be supported, as was the case with previous timber designs. Allan's design was very cost-effective.

The Hampden Bridge in New South Wales Australia was the first of a larger style bridge to be built on Percy Allan’s design with the Tharwa Bridge pre-dating it.

== Dare type truss ==
Harvey Dare was a leading engineer in the Public Works Department, and a prominent figure in early 20th century NSW. He was a designer of bridges and he developed the Dare Truss which was similar to the Allan truss but contained improvements which made them stronger and easier to maintain. This engineering enhancement represents a significant evolution of the design of timber truss bridges, and gives Dare trusses some technical significance. Dare Trusses were the fifth of the five stages of evolution of timber truss road bridges in NSW.

In 1998 there were 27 surviving Dare trusses in NSW of the 40 built, and 82 timber truss road bridges survive from the over 400 built.

== See also ==
- List of bridges in Australia
