= Jarvisfield, Picton =

Jarvisfield
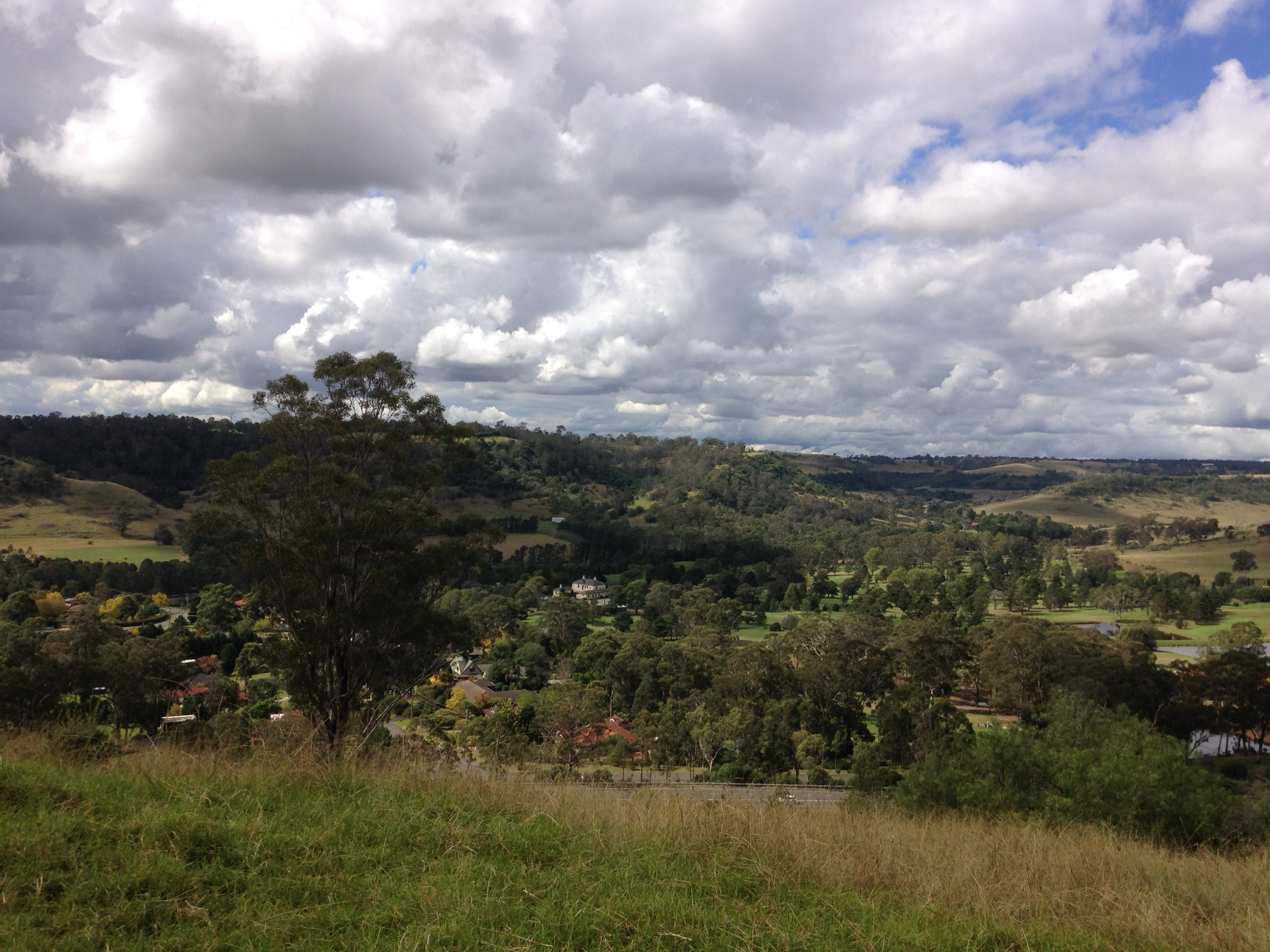

- Location within New South Wales
- 34°09′51″S 150°37′43″E
- Location: Old Hume Highway, Picton, Wollondilly Shire, New South Wales, Australia

History
- Built: 1815–1864
- Built for: Major H C Antill

Site notes
- Architect: William Weaver
- Owner: Wollondilly Shire Council

New South Wales Heritage Register
- Official name: Jarvisfield; Wilton
- Type: State heritage (landscape)
- Designated: 2 April 1999
- Reference no.: 305
- Type: Historic Landscape
- Category: Landscape - Cultural

Jarvisfield is a heritage-listed former pastoral property and now golf course on the Old Hume Highway at Picton, in the Macarthur region of New South Wales, Australia. It was designed by William Weaver, architect-engineer, and built from 1815 to 1864. It is also known as Wilton. The property is owned by the Wollondilly Shire Council. It was added to the New South Wales State Heritage Register on 2 April 1999.

== History ==
Jarvisfield was home of the Antill family from c. 1817 – 1937 (at least). Major H. C. (Henry Colden) Antill was born in New York in 1779, second son of John and Margaret Antill. John was a major of the Second Battalion of the New Jersey Volunteers (Loyalists). Margaret was granddaughter of Cadwallader Colden. Henry enlisted with the British Army as ensign in 1796, served with the 73rd Regiment, was promoted to captain in 1809 and received a medal for bravery following the storming of Seringaptam in India, where he was badly wounded. Along with Governor and Mrs Macquarie he arrived in Sydney on HMS Dromedary in December 1809 with his regiment, and was appointed Aide-de-Camp to Macquarie on 1 January 1810.

Antill retired from the Army in 1821 and in 1822 was the first to receive a grant of 809 hectares (2,000 acres) in the area now known as Picton (previously known as Stonequarry), over the brow of Razorback mountain. Antill named a nearby hill Mount Nebo and built the first slab homestead on this site in the 1810s. He later built a larger family house, c. 1823-4, naming it Wilton for his father's estate in the American colonies, but later changing the name to Jarvisfield, to honour Governor Macquarie's first wife's maiden name, Jarvis. Antill had known Jane Jarvis in India, and was both friend of and Aide-de-Camp to Governor Macquarie. The name Jarvis Field was taken from a property owned by Macquarie on the Isle of Mull in Scotland. From 1831 to 1833 Antill was a director of the Bank of New South Wales and later became Police Magistrate for the County of Camden from 2 October 1829 until his death in 1852.

Major Antill renamed the town of Stonequarry as Picton after General Sir Thomas Picton, a hero of The Battle of Waterloo. Antill retired on half pay and settled on his grant, tending sheep, pigs and cows. He was the squire of the Picton district, a magistrate, pillar of the local church (St. Mark's Anglican, Picton), supporter of the local school. Antill died in 1852, and was buried in the family vault on a hill north of and overlooking the town of Picton.

The Brookside Restaurant (former Razorback Inn), is now at 1580 Hume Highway Deviation and separately LEP-listed. Built on four acres sold by Antill to Oliver Whiting, ex-convict and servant of the Antill family. It appears that the inn was completed in 1850 and a licence issued for that date. Continued to operate until Whitings moved to an inn at Picton when the railway opened. A Mr. Turner who later lived in the building found two English pennies dated 1850 under the foundations of the place when renovating it. Later used as a guest-house and residence named Brookside, also as a restaurant. It is now used in association with the Woolshed complex for functions.

Architect and engineer William Weaver (1828–68) designed (the current house) Jarvisfield for Antill. It was built in 1863. Plans for the house (and of Burrundulla, Mudgee for the Cox family) still exist, and are clear examples of Weaver's capability as an architect and of his apparently consistent preference for a traditional colonial style. Burrundulla, with its wide sides and surrounding verandah, illustrates the versatility of conservative Georgian colonial design in Weaver's hands, whereas Jarvisfield recalls the stronger lines of (Weaver's) Villa Maria (1857) at Gladesville. The features of the back of both buildings are almost identical, with arched landing windows set with coloured glass, elongated sides and courtyard.

Both of these buildings stood below (a few hundred metres to the east of) the present brick/plaster mansion. Part of the second house still stood in 1937. Bricks for the house were made on the property. A new (third) house was made in 1864/5 by John Macquarie Antill, who founded the Jarvisfield Ayrshire Stud in 1875. He was a prominent breeder and agriculturist.

=== The Antill family ===
At least three generations of Antills lived at Jarvisfield until the 1930s: Henry Colden Antill (1779–1852), John Macquarie Antill Senior (1822–1900) and John Macquarie Antill Junior (1866–1937). Henry Colden was born in New York of British stock, his great grandfather Edward having migrated from England to America in 1680. His father John had fought in the war of American Independence. The family migrated first to Canada; Henry was in the British army in India; he migrated to Sydney on 1 January 1810, married Eliza Wills in Sydney in 1818, settled near Liverpool, in 1825 settling on his estate near Picton, Jarvisfield and, in 1844 subdivided part of his estate on the north of Stonequarry Creek, as the result he made possible the founding of the town of Picton. Henry died and was buried in the family vault at Jarvisfield, in August 1852, survived by six sons and two daughters.

John Macquarie Antill Sr. was born in Liverpool on 30 May 1822 and at age 18 went to manage the Primrose Valley estate, Molonglo, NSW, concentrating on sheep breeding. At 24 he was appointed a Police Magistrate in Picton, holding this position until his death in 1900. His wife Jessie Hassall Campbell was born on 28 March 1834, married J. M. Antill Sr. in 1851 and continued to live in Jarvisfield with a daughter and their grandchildren, after her husband's death in 1900. She died in Picton in 1917. J. M. Antill Sr. was appointed receiving officer for the Camden electorate in1877, which included Picton. He inherited Jarvisfield in 1858, building a new homestead there for his family in 1864. Wheat growing was ruined by rust, and sheep-raising on account of fluke, both apparently because it was too close to the coast. In 1875 from imported stock, John Sr. established the Ayrshire Study which made Jarvisfield famous. Jessie and John Sr. had 11 children, two of whom did not reach adult life.

Antill's grandson Major-General John Macquarie Antill CB, CMG was born at Jarvisfield on 26 January 1866, second surviving son of John and Jessie. John Jr. was educated at Sydney Grammar School and became a surveyor. He joined the local militia in 1887 and in 1889, raised a squadron of mounted infantry in Picton, of which he was given command. This became part of the NSW Mounted Rifles, in which he was commissioned as a captain on 19 January 1889. He had a tour of duty with the British Army in India in 1893. On return to Australia in 1894, he was commissioned into the state's permanent forces as a captain. He was promoted to major in 1899 and given command of "A" Squadron of the NSW Mounted Rifles. This squadron participated in the cavalry sweep to relieve Kimberley (Sth. Africa) and was involved in operations in Transvaal and Orange River Colony. Antill was mentioned twice in dispatches, appointed Companion of Bath (CB), returning to Australia a war hero. From 1904 to 1906 he emulated his grandfather by becoming Aide-de-Camp to the governor-general, Lord Northcote. After this he retired from the army and returned to Picton. In World War I in October 1914 he was appointed to the AIF as brigade major of the 3rd Light Horse Brigade in Turkey. He retired from the army in 1924 with the honorary rank of major-general, spending several years at Jarvisfield and later living at Manly and Dee Why. Major-General Antill died in 1937, leaving his older brother Robert Henry (Harry) in charge. R. H. Antill was a prominent pastoralist and a noted breeder of Ayrshire cattle. He was chairman of the Picton Pastures Protection Board in 1901–28 and served as district coroner for forty-two years.

In 1967 the Antill Park Golf Club was established on the site, with the homestead forming the club house. 2012 was believed to be the 50th anniversary of formation of the Antill Park Golf Club, lease of the present site and club house. The original club occupied part of a private property on both sides of the present Henry Street.

== Description ==
=== Estate ===
The core of a once large (2000 acre) grant remains, today managed as a golf course estate near the town of Picton.

The golf course is an 18 Hole course with a challenging Par 70 layout, including many picturesque holes flanked by water hazards. At the centre of the Antill Park Country Golf Club is the clubhouse overlooking the 9th Hole and the 10th Tee.

=== Garden and early plantings ===
The house is surrounded by still extensive grounds, formerly gardens and farmland, now the Antill Park Country Golf Club (since 1967). Little evidence of the homestead garden has survived. There are some mature specimens of native pines (Araucaria spp. - hoop (A.cunninghamii) and bunya (A.bidwillii) pines) in the front of the house which are important plantings and survive in 2012 (Kabaila).

Considerable numbers of mature exotic and native trees planted by the Antills remain, along with more recent Golf Club era plantings. Early tree plantings remaining near the house give a representative selection of common exotic and some locally native tree species often used on the Cumberland Plain's early farms. These also include some now very rare plants in NSW, and particularly locally rare in the Sydney Basin, such as Chinese funeral cypress (Cupressus funebris) and the American Osage orange.

Early tree plantings include bunya pines (Araucaria bidwillii), hoop pines (Araucaria cunninghamii), English elms (Ulmus procera) which have suckered into thickets in places, kurrajongs (Brachychiton populneus), white cedars (Melia azederach var.australasica), English oaks (Quercus robur), shelter belts/former farm hedges of American Osage orange (Maclura pomifera). Osage oranges are now extremely rare in the Sydney basin - only two other examples are known, at Hambledon Cottage, Parramatta and Muogamarra Nature Reserve, Hornsby. The Osage orange hedges north and south of the house on its eastern side date to the time the house was first occupied. They have historical significance as part of the early fabric of the place and their association with the Antill family, and are an integral component of the landscaping.

Other early plantings include false acacia (Robinia pseudoacacia, again probably originally shelter belt plantings), again suckering into thickets.

=== Homestead ===
The (now Golf Club-) house was built in 1863 by John Macquarie Antill, hence the name of the club, Antill Park Country Golf Club. It was first named Jarvisfield, commemorating Governor Macquarie's first wife Jane Jarvis' name and the fact that an Antill had been long-serving aide-de-camp to and a friend of Governor Macquarie. The homestead's verandah overlooks the course and is frequented by locals and visitors who wish to analyse their round, the treachery of the greens or simply enjoy the serene views throughout the course.

A two-storey, rendered brick, Georgian Revival country villa with flanking single storey wings which form the sides of the rear courtyard. The hipped roofs of main house and wings are slated and have rendered brickwork chimneys with simple neck mouldings. The single storey verandah lining the front and part of the two side elevations retain their original flat timber columns (but has a new roof following the removal of an Edwardian double storeyed verandah). The new roof line follows the original which was retained in the side return roofs. The front door is flanked by French doors with 2 x 6 paned sash windows to the first floor. On the side elevations blank window recesses maintain facade symmetry at first floor level. The rear elevation is dominated by a large round-headed stair window.

=== Barn ===
The site also contains a mid-19th century stone barn. The barn is a simple gable-roofed structure of coursed sparrow-pecked sandstone with exposed timber beams and rafters. Following the site's conversion to a golf course the barn was reused as a Pro-Golf Shop and has undergone extensive internal change as a result.

A stable outbuilding, two storied and made of sandstone blocks, remains to the south-west of the main house (AHC).

The group listed by the Australian Heritage Commission consists of:

- the former Homestead, Jarvisfield (WO0148)
- the Jarvisfield Stone Barn (WO0149)
- the Brookside Restaurant (Razorback Inn) (WO0150).

When the listing was made, these were rural buildings which retained their original relationship to the main road, to each other and to the rural landscape. The group is now part of a golf course with modern residential subdivision in close proximity to the house and barn. A new access road through the new subdivision has been provided.

=== Razorback Inn (former, 1850) ===
The Brookside Restaurant (former Razorback Inn), is now at 1580 Hume Highway Deviation, and separately LEP-listed. Built on two hectares (four acres) sold by H. C. Antill to Oliver Whiting ex-convict and servant of the Antill family. It appears that the inn was completed in 1850 and a licence issued for that date. Continued to operate until Whitings moved to an inn at Picton when the railway opened. A Mr. Turner who later lived in the building found two English pennies dated 1850 under the foundations of the place when renovating it. Later used as a guest-house and residence named "Brookside", also as a restaurant. It is now used in association with the Woolshed complex for functions.

=== Third House (1864/5) ===
The third house built on the grant in 1864/5 remains, a large two-storey brick mansion/house plastered over, with verandah facing east, and two wings single storeyed wings to rear (west).

Jarvisfield Store (now 470 Menangle Street, Picton and separately LEP-listed) (1863): Built on a 46-hectare (114-acre) lot in 1863 (date in plaster plaque), the land forming part of Jarvisfield where H. C. Antill developed the town of Picton in response to the coming of the railway line and station. One of many small shops catering for the general public until closure of the Picton railway depot. Later known as "The Bailiff's" because retired police sergeant, McRae, lived there and was town bailiff after retiring from the force. In recent years it was used as a residence and it has now been refurbished for use as an antiques shop.

=== Condition ===
As at 13 May 2003, the 1810s first slab homestead built on this site. In c. 1824-5 Major H. C. Antill built a larger family house. Both of these buildings stood below (a few hundred metres to the east of) the present house/mansion. Part of the second house still stood in 1937. In 1864/5, the third house was built of bricks made on the property. In 1967 the estate became the Antill Park Country Golf Club, and the third house its clubhouse.

=== Modifications and dates ===
- c. 1910 – upper storey homestead verandah added, ground floor verandah modified, upper floor French doors added
- 1964 – conversion of homestead to Golf Club house, by Howard Morton, architect
- c. 1985 – restoration works including drainage, ground floor verandah, removal of upper verandah doors undertaken by Howard Tanner, architect.
- 2012 – ground floor verandah restoration and roof repair by NSW Public Works.

=== Further information ===
Date of current mansion unknown.

== Heritage listing ==
As at 17 August 2007, Jarvisfield's remaining estate is a rural cultural landscape containing the core of the original farm grant, the third Antill house constructed on it, a sandstone stable outbuilding and extensive grounds containing considerable numbers of mature exotic and native trees planted by the Antills.

These early plantings give a representative selection of common exotic and some locally native tree species often used on the Cumberland Plain's early farms. These also include some now very rare plants in NSW, and particularly locally rare in the Sydney Basin, such as Chinese funeral cypress (Cupressus funebris) and American osage orange (Maclura pomifera).

Osage oranges are now extremely rare in the Sydney basin - only two other examples are known, at Hambledon Cottage, Parramatta and Muogamarra Nature Reserve, Hornsby.

Jarvisfield was listed on the New South Wales State Heritage Register on 2 April 1999 having satisfied the following criteria.

The place is important in demonstrating the course, or pattern, of cultural or natural history in New South Wales.

The Osage orange hedges north and south of the house on its eastern side date to the time the house was first occupied. They have historical significance as part of the early fabric of the place and their association with the Antill family, and are an integral component of the landscaping.

The place has a strong or special association with a person, or group of persons, of importance of cultural or natural history of New South Wales's history.

The Osage orange hedges north and south of the house on its eastern side date to the time the house was first occupied. They have historical significance as part of the early fabric of the place and their association with the Antill family, and are an integral component of the landscaping.

== See also ==
- Australian residential architectural styles
