= The Picton Post =

Australian newspaper

The Picton Argus was an English language newspaper published in Picton, New South Wales, Australia. It was also named The Picton Advocate, The Picton Post and Advocate and finally The Picton Post in 1907.

== History ==
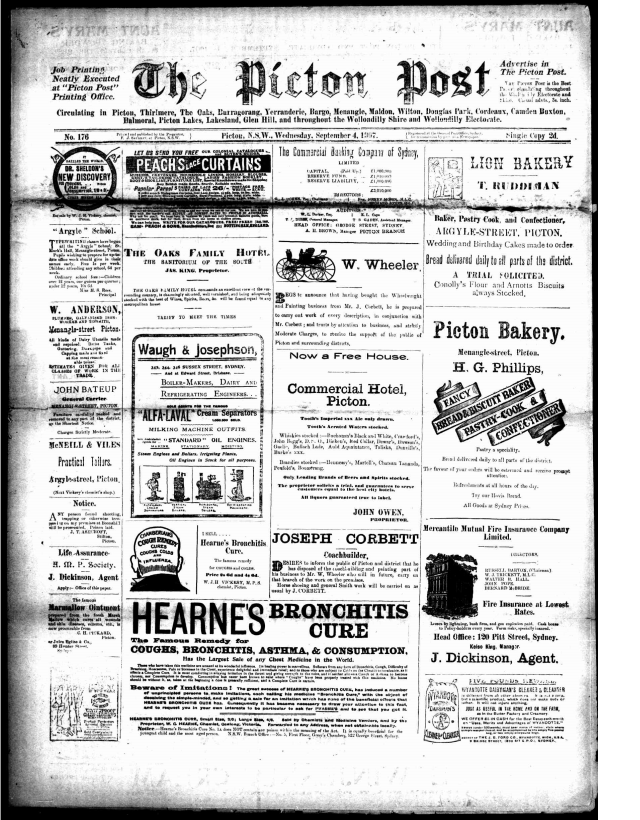
Picton Post, 4 Sept. 1907

The Picton Argus started around 1885 and was published by Edward Frederick Webb. It ceased in 1896 and was continued by The Picton Advocate, published by Alfred Stanley-Turner which continued until around 1898 when it became The Picton Post and Advocate, published by W.A. Laverty. This publication continued until August 1907 when it became simply The Picton Post, published by A.L. Burgess which ceased in June 1982 when it was absorbed by The Macarthur Advertiser.

== Digitisation ==
The various versions of the paper have been digitised as part of the Australian Newspapers Digitisation Program project hosted by the National Library of Australia.

== See also ==
- List of newspapers in New South Wales
- List of newspapers in Australia

== Bibliography ==
- Country conscience : a history of the New South Wales provincial press, 1841-1995 / by Rod Kirkpatrick, Canberra City, A.C.T. : Infinite Harvest Publishing, 2000
- Looking good : the changing appearance of Australian newspapers / by Victor Isaacs, for the Australian Newspapers History Group, Middle Park, Qld. : Australian Newspaper History Group, 2007.
- Press timeline : Select chronology of significant Australian press events to 2011 / Compiled by Rod Kirkpatrick for the Australian Newspaper History Group
- Australian Newspaper History : A Bibliography / Compiled by Victor Isaacs, Rod Kirkpatrick and John Russell, Middle Park, Qld. : Australian Newspaper History Group, 2004.
- Newspapers in Australian libraries : a union list. 4th ed.
