= Mitchell's Causeway =

Causeway in New South Wales, Australia

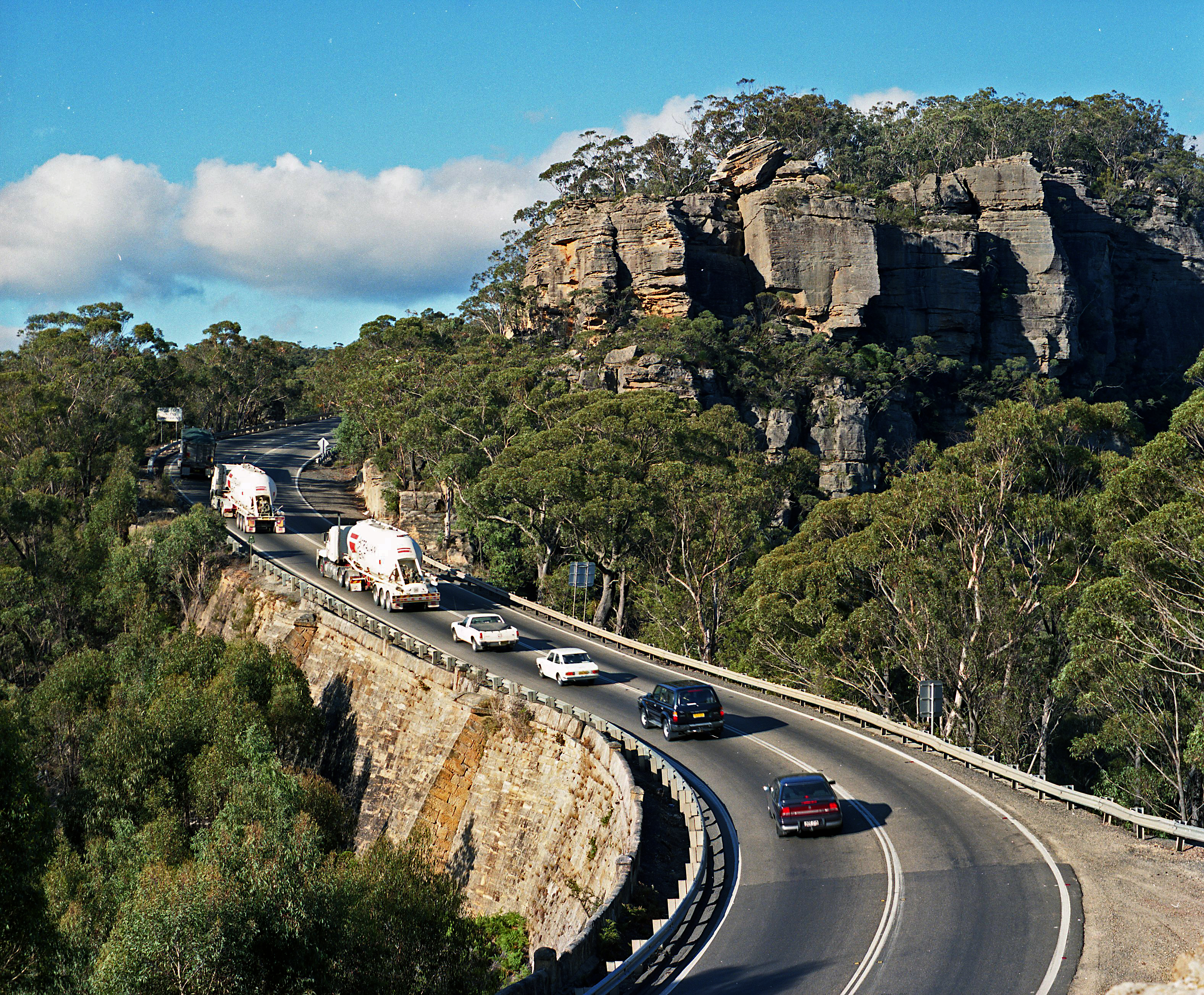
- Traffic heading east on the causeway in 1994
- Coordinates: 33°34′55″S 150°13′52″E
- Carries: Great Western Highway
- Locale: Blue Mountains
- Begins: Mount Victoria (west bound)
- Ends: Hartley (west bound)
- Other names: Convict Bridge; Victoria Pass Causeway; Mitchell's Bridge
- Named for: Major Thomas Mitchell
- Owner: Transport for NSW
- Maintained by: Transport for NSW

Characteristics
- Design: Causeway; road bridge
- Material: Sydney sandstone
- Total length: 150 m (490 ft)
- Height: 4 to 11 m (13 to 36 ft)
- No. of lanes: 2

History
- Designer: Major Thomas Mitchell
- Constructed by: Convict labour
- Built: 1829 - 1832
- Opened: 1832
- Closed: March 2026 (temporary)

Statistics
- Daily traffic: 12,000

New South Wales Heritage Register
- Official name: Victoria Pass and Berghofers Pass
- Type: Built
- Criteria: a, b, c, e, f
- Designated: 8 March 2024
- Reference no.: 2084

Location
- Interactive map of Mitchell's Causeway

Mitchell's Causeway, also known as the Convict Bridge, is a historic sandstone causeway in the Blue Mountains of New South Wales, Australia. It is located on the Great Western Highway and forms the central section of Victoria Pass, the length of the highway connecting the plateau of the Blue Mountains to the Hartley Valley, immediately to the west of the town of Mount Victoria. The causeway spans a 150m wide depression between two large outcrops. it was built primarily by convict labour under the supervision of Surveyor General of the Colony of New South Wales, Thomas Mitchell, and was opened in 1832. The causeway is a large reverse-curve stone-walled embankment supported by buttresses with internal rubble fill.

In March 2026, major geotechnical failures were discovered within the structure of the causeway, resulting in its temporary closure. Prior to its closure, the causeway, initially built for safe passage of horse-drawn vehicles, carried approximately 12,000 vehicles per day, including heavy vehicles such as semi-trailer trucks.

== Construction ==
Victoria Pass was designed by Major Thomas Mitchell as a solution to the problem of the steepness and geometry of previous routes of the Great Western Road down Mount York. The pass was created by cutting a bench for the roadway along the escarpment, creating a cutting on one side of the roadway and building up a retaining wall with large sandstone blocks on the lower side. The pass climbs a height of 110 m in a distance of 2.5 km.

The causeway section, needed to connect the upper and lower bench sections of the pass, was constructed by erecting a pair of buttressed sandstone retaining walls, with the space between them being filled with earth and rubble to create a level platform upon which the road could be built.

The pass was hand-built by gangs of convicts, some of whom left engravings in the sandstone blocks of the causeway. At the time of its 2007 listing on the NSW Heritage Register, it was the only known substantial stone causeway structure from the early Colonial period of NSW.

Whilst the sections of Victoria Pass above and below the causeway were substantially upgraded in 1934, and widened from two to four lanes in the late 1960s, the difficulty and expense of upgrading the causeway have meant that until now, little has been expended on the causeway other than for routine maintenance. However safety upgrades along the causeway included installation of steel guardrails along the insides of retaining wall parapets, and an improved road surface, though the structure's heritage listing now prevents major modifications.

== Usage ==
Originally the causeway carried horse and wagon traffic. The first generation of motor cars introduced in Australia in the early 20th century were not powerful enough to climb the steep slope of the causeway, so an alternate route, Berghofer's Pass, was built to the north of Mitchell's Causeway climbing the same hillside but at a lower height, and on a longer route, resulting in a lesser gradient.

While involving many more sharp turns, this route formed part of the Great Western Road between 1912 and 1920, while Victoria Pass was effectively abandoned. In 1920 motor cars had evolved sufficiently to be able to traverse the gradient of Victoria Pass, and it was used concurrently with Berghofer's Pass until the latter was closed in 1934 (though it was used unofficially until the 1950s). Berghofer's Pass is now a walking track.

Mitchell's Causeway forms part of the Great Western Highway, carrying loads of heavy traffic in excess of 12,000 vehicles per day between Central Western New South Wales and the Blue Mountains, including many semi-trailer trucks. This level of traffic is far beyond the original intended purpose of the causeway, and its heritage-listed status prevents it from being significantly altered.

== 2026 closure ==
On 5 March 2026, Transport for NSW discovered a small hole in the road surface of the causeway. The eastbound lane was closed and constant monitoring began alongside geotechnical investigations. On 8 March, large stress fractures formed on the road surface and the causeway was closed to all traffic, including emergency services. The causeway was initially closed for a projected period of at least three months, as further investigations continued.

Traffic was diverted at Mount Victoria via the Darling Causeway and The Chifley Road, rejoining the Great Western Highway at Bowenfels. Sydney Trains increased services from Mount Victoria to Lithgow while a shuttle train service was introduced between Lithgow and Bathurst using an Endeavour railcar. Additional coach services from Katoomba to Bathurst were also introduced. The Government of New South Wales announced additional funding for the upgrade of detours, whilst the causeway was closed.

The government subsequently announced that Mitchell's Causeway would be closed for at least three months. In May 2026, two consortia, one led by led by Gamuda and one led by Seymour Whyte, were invited to submit tenders to rebuild the causeway.

As of June 2026, the state government has projected that this part of the Great Western Highway will reopen between April and June 2027 following its construction by Seymour Whyte, the government also provided an extra $20 million package to assist small businesses during the closure.

== Gallery ==
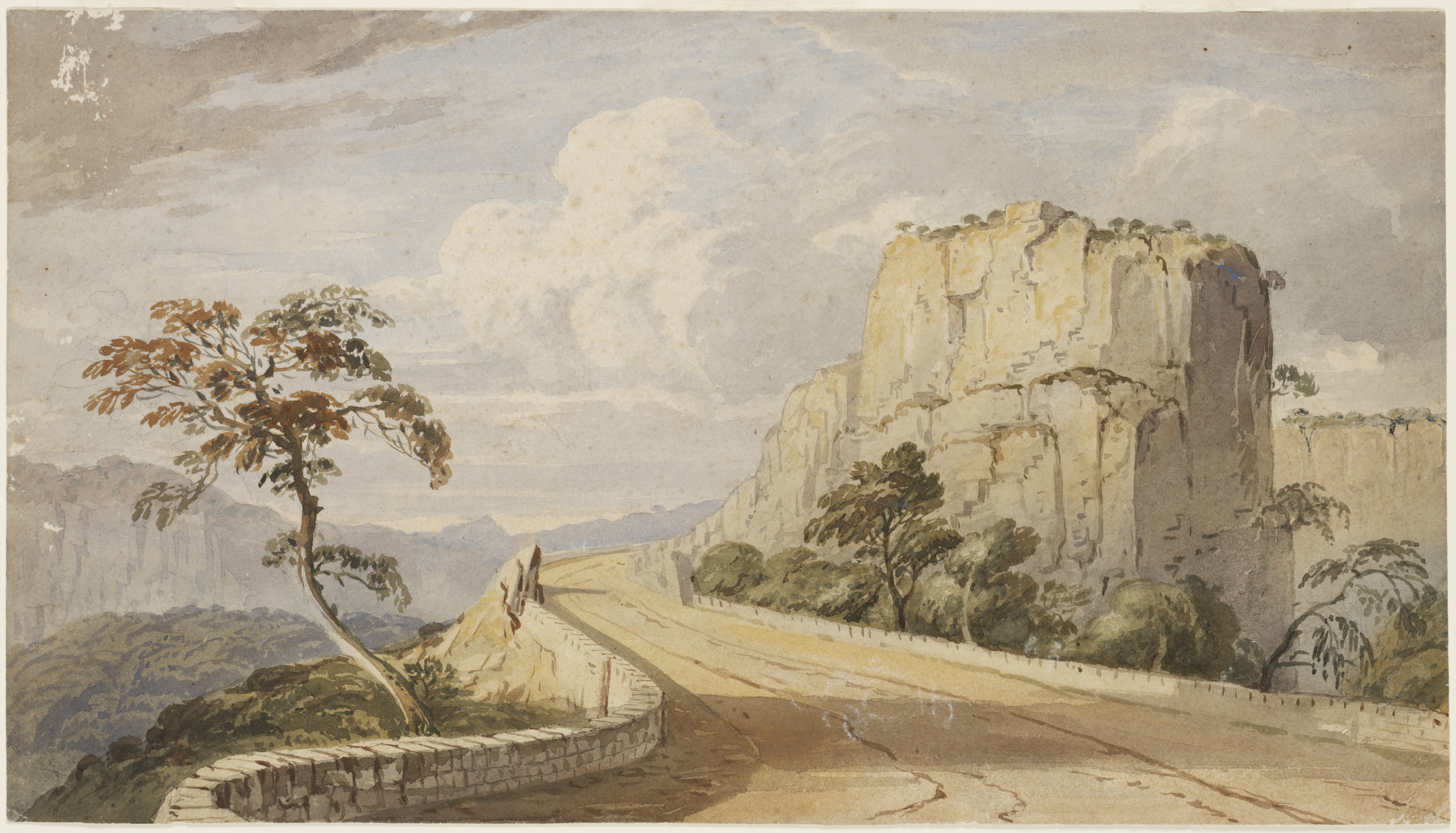
Watercolour by Mitchell of the completed causeway

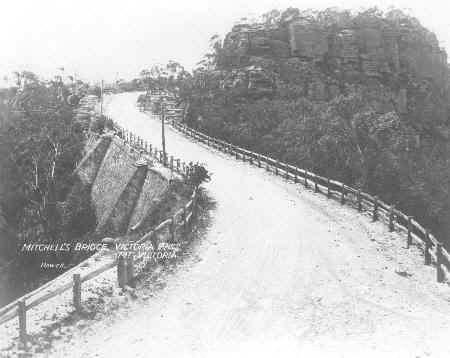
Mitchell's Causeway, undated

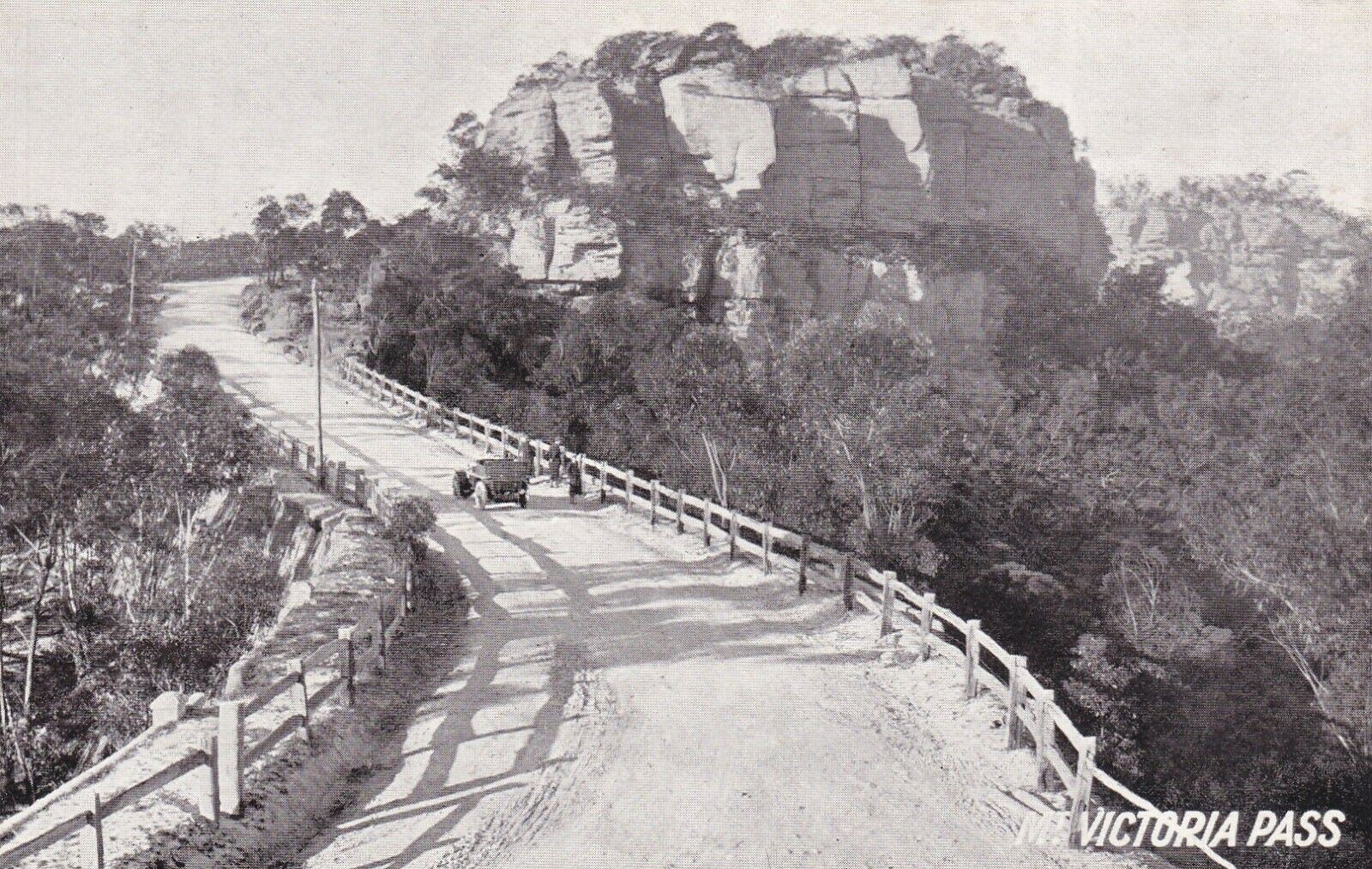
Mitchell's Causeway, early 1900s

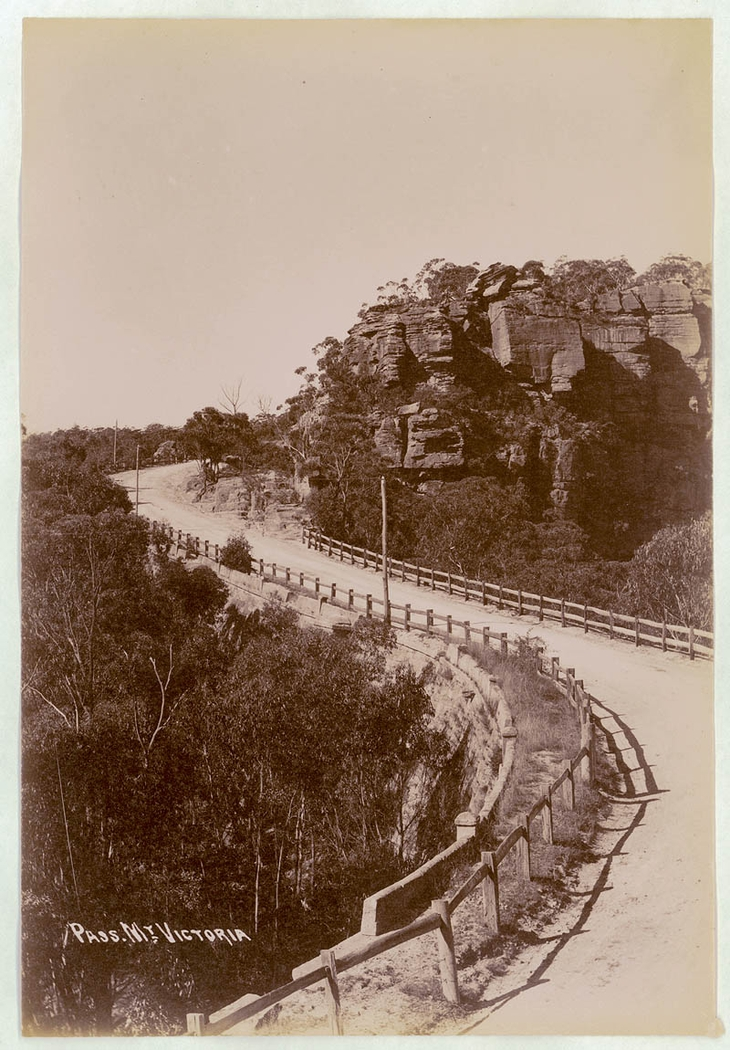
Mitchell's Causeway, 1900–1910

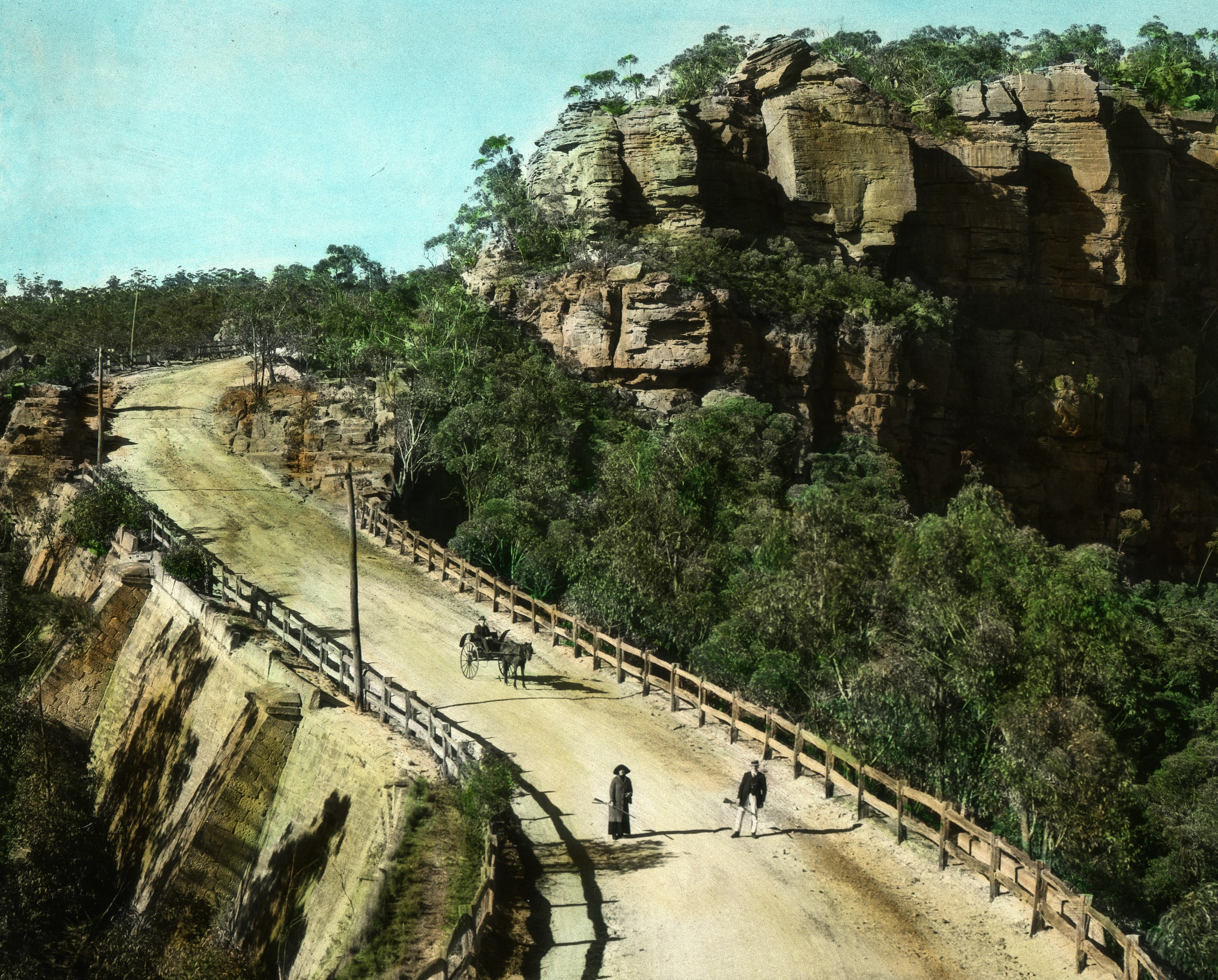
Mitchell's Causeway, 1910

== See also ==
- Historic bridges of New South Wales
- Lennox Bridge, Glenbrook
- List of bridges in Australia
