= Victoria Bridge, Picton =

- Coordinates: 34°10′49″S 150°36′38″E
- Carries: Prince Street: Motor vehicles; Pedestrians
- Crosses: Stonequarry Creek
- Locale: Picton, Wollondilly Shire, New South Wales, Australia
- Official name: Victoria Bridge over Stonequarry Creek
- Named for: Queen Victoria
- Owner: Transport for NSW

Characteristics
- Design: Allan truss
- Material: Ironbark timber
- Total length: 83.4 m (274 ft)
- Width: 3.7 m (12 ft)
- Longest span: 27 m (90 ft)
- No. of spans: 3
- Clearance above: 2.4 m (7 ft 10 in)
- Clearance below: 28 m (92 ft)
- No. of lanes: 1

History
- Engineering design by: Percy Allan
- Constructed by: C. J. Foord
- Construction start: 1895
- Construction end: 1897
- Construction cost: A£3,700
- Opened: 7 October 1897

New South Wales Heritage Register
- Official name: Victoria Bridge over Stonequarry Creek
- Type: State heritage (built)
- Designated: 20 June 2000
- Reference no.: 1484
- Type: Road Bridge
- Category: Transport – Land

The Victoria Bridge is a heritage-listed timber trestle truss road bridge across the Stonequarry Creek, located at Prince Street in the south-western Sydney town of Picton in the Wollondilly Shire local government area of New South Wales, Australia. The bridge is owned by Transport for NSW, an agency of the Government of New South Wales. The bridge is also known as the Victoria Bridge over Stonequarry Creek. It was added to the New South Wales State Heritage Register on 20 June 2000. Designed by Percy Allan and opened on 7 October 1897, Victoria Bridge employs Allan trusses and was built by C. J. Ford of Sydney.

It features the tallest trestles in New South Wales, and is one of the oldest surviving bridges of its type. It is named after Queen Victoria, and is classified by the National Trust. Victoria Bridge is wide enough for a pedestrian walkway and one lane of traffic and is 83.4 m (274 ft) long. The bridge has a height limit of 2.4 m (7 ft 10 in). The bridge is listed by the Engineers Institute as historically significant.

== History ==
=== Picton ===
The town of Picton was named by Major Antill after Sir Thomas Picton in 1841. The location was previously known as "Stonequarry". The Duke of Wellington described Picton as a "rough foul-mouthed devil as ever lived" but very capable. He was "respected for his courage and feared for his irrascible temperament". He was chiefly remembered for his exploits under Wellington in the Iberinan Peninsular War displaying great bravery and persistence. He was killed at the Battle of Waterloo and was the most senior officer to die there. He was buried in the family vault at St. George's, Hanover Square in London. In 1859 Picton was re-interred in St. Paul's Cathedral, London, lying close to the body of the Duke of Wellington.

=== Victoria Bridge ===
Timber truss road bridges have played a significant role in the expansion and improvement of the NSW road network. Prior to the bridges being built, river crossings were often dangerous in times of rain, which caused bulk freight movement to be prohibitively expensive for most agricultural and mining produce. Only the high priced wool clip of the time was able to carry the costs and inconvenience imposed by the generally inadequate river crossings that often existed prior to the trusses construction. Timber truss bridges were preferred by the NSW Public Works Department from the mid 19th to the early 20th century because they were relatively cheap to construct, and used mostly local materials. The financially troubled governments of the day applied pressure to the Public Works Department to produce as much road and bridge work for as little cost as possible, using local materials. This condition effectively prohibited the use of iron and steel, as these, prior to the construction of the steel works at Newcastle in the early 20th century, had to be imported from England.

Timber Allan trusses were the first truly scientifically engineered timber truss bridges, and incorporate American design ideas for the first time. This is a reflection of the changing mindset of the NSW people, who were slowly accepting that American ideas could be as good as or better than European ones. The high quality and low cost of the Allan truss design entrenched the dominance of timber truss bridges for NSW roads for the next thirty years.

Percy Allan, the designer of Allan truss and other bridges, was a senior engineer of the NSW Public Works Department, and a prominent figure in late 19th century NSW. Timber truss bridges, and timber bridges generally were so common that NSW was known to travellers as the "timber bridge state".

== Description ==
The Victoria Bridge is an Allan-type timber truss road bridge. It has three timber truss spans, each of 27.4 m (90 ft). There are no approach spans. The overall length of the bridge is 83.4 m (274 ft). The super structure is supported by timber trestles which carry a single-lane carriageway with a minimum width of 3.7 m (12 ft) and a footpath. A timber post and rail guard rail extends the full length of the bridge and an Armco barrier protects pedestrians from vehicular traffic.

=== Condition ===
As of 10 July 2023, fair and intact.

== Heritage listing ==
As at 15 June 2005, completed in 1897, the Victoria bridge is an early example of an Allan type timber truss road bridge, and in 1998 was in fair condition. As a timber truss road bridge, it has many associational links with important historical events, trends, and people, including the expansion of the road network and economic activity throughout NSW, and Percy Allan, the designer of this type of truss. Allan trusses were third in the five-stage design evolution of NSW timber truss bridges, and were a major improvement over the McDonald trusses which preceded them. Allan trusses were twenty per cent cheaper to build than McDonald trusses, could carry 50 per cent more load, and were easier to maintain. Having the tallest timber trestle supporting piers of any timber truss bridge, the Victoria bridge has an imposing appearance, and is both technically and aesthetically significant as a result.

In 1998 there were 38 surviving Allan trusses in NSW of the 105 built, and 82 timber truss road bridges survive from the over 400 built.

The Victoria bridge is a representative example of Allan timber truss road bridges, and is assessed as being State significant, primarily on the basis of its technical and historical significance.

Victoria Bridge over Stonequarry Creek was listed on the New South Wales State Heritage Register on 20 June 2000 having satisfied the following criteria.

The place is important in demonstrating the course, or pattern, of cultural or natural history in New South Wales.

Through the bridge's association with the expansion of the NSW road network, its ability to demonstrate historically important concepts such as the gradual acceptance of NSW people of American design ideas, and its association with Percy Allan, it has historical significance.

The place is important in demonstrating aesthetic characteristics and/or a high degree of creative or technical achievement in New South Wales.

The bridge exhibits the technical excellence of its design, as all of the structural detail is clearly visible. In the context of its landscape it is visually attractive. As such, the bridge has substantial aesthetic significance. Having the tallest timber trestle supporting piers of any timber truss bridge, the Victoria bridge has an imposing appearance, and is both technically and aesthetically significant as a result.

The place has a strong or special association with a particular community or cultural group in New South Wales for social, cultural or spiritual reasons.

Timber truss bridges are prominent to road travellers, and NSW has in the past been referred to as the "timber truss bridge state". Through this, the complete set of bridges gain some social significance, as they could be said to be held in reasonable esteem by many travellers in NSW. The Victoria bridge is valued by the people of the Picton district.

The place possesses uncommon, rare or endangered aspects of the cultural or natural history of New South Wales.

Rare – In 1998 there were 38 surviving Allan trusses in NSW of the 105 built, and 82 timber truss road bridges survive from the over 400 built.

The place is important in demonstrating the principal characteristics of a class of cultural or natural places/environments in New South Wales.

Representative of Allan truss bridges.

== See also ==
- Historic bridges of New South Wales
- List of bridges in Australia
