= John Antill (general) =

Australian Army officer

Major General John Macquarie Antill CB CMG
- Colonel Antill on Rhododendron Spur during the Gallipoli Campaign.
- Born: 26 January 1866; Jarvisfield, Picton, New South Wales
- Died: 1 March 1937 (aged 71); Sydney, New South Wales
- Military career
- Allegiance: New South Wales Military Forces; Australian Military Forces
- Service years: 1887–1906; 1911–1924
- Rank: Major General
- Nicknames: "Bull", "Bullant"
- Commands: 5th Military District (1918–20); 16th Infantry Brigade (1917); 2nd Infantry Brigade (1916); 3rd Light Horse Brigade (1915–16)
- Conflicts: Second Boer War; First World War; Battle of the Nek; Battle of Romani; Battle of the Somme
- Awards: Companion of the Order of the Bath; Companion of the Order of St Michael and St George; Mentioned in Despatches (6)
- Other work: Co-authored play The Emancipist

Major General John Macquarie Antill, CB, CMG (26 January 1866 – 1 March 1937) was a senior Australian Army officer. He served as an officer in the New South Wales Mounted Rifles during in the Second Boer War and was a general in the Australian Imperial Force in the First World War.

Antill is best known for not stopping the futile charges on the Turkish lines at The Nek in the Gallipoli Campaign in August 1915, during which four waves of attackers barely got "over the top" before being cut down by Turkish fire. The ANZAC forces suffered a 60% casualty rate, most having been cut down en masse just feet from their own trenches. He later command the 3rd Light Horse Brigade in the final months of the Gallipoli Campaign, and then during the early part of the Sinai and Palestine campaign. In August 1916, he was offered command of the 2nd Infantry Brigade and commanded the brigade briefly on the Western Front, until his health deteriorated and he was evacuated to England in November 1916. In early 1917, Antill took over command of the embryonic 16th Infantry Brigade, but this formation was disbanded before it was fully formed and Antill ultimately did not see action again. He returned to Australia in late 1917.

He retired from the military in 1924 with the rank of honorary major general. In retirement, he co-wrote a play about William Redfern, called The Emancipist. He died in 1937 from cancer.

== Early life and career ==
Antill was born on 26 January 1866 at the family estate of Jarvisfield, in Picton, New South Wales. His parents were John Macquarie Antill (1822–1900) and Jessie Hassall Campbell (1834–1917); he was the second of their surviving sons. Antill attended Sydney Grammar where he was a member of the school's cadet unit, and after completing his education he became a surveyor. His older brother Robert Henry Antill (1859–1938) became a pastoralist and coroner. His sister was Elisabeth Ann Antill (1871–1927) who married Brigadier General Harry Lassetter in 1891, and survived the sinking of the RMS Lusitania in 1915. He was a keen sportsman in his youth, and was an accomplished fencer and boxer.

In 1887, Antill became a member of the local militia. Two years later, he took command of a squadron of the New South Wales Mounted Rifles that he helped to raise in Picton, and from 19 January 1889 he served in this unit with the rank of captain. Under orders from Major General Edward Hutton, the commander of the New South Wales Military Forces, Antill undertook a temporary detachment to the British Army, serving with them in India in 1893, where he was attached firstly to the 1st Battalion, Devonshire Regiment and then to the 2nd Dragoon Guards. He completed this in 1894, and was given a permanent commission as a captain in the New South Wales military.

== Military career ==
=== Boer War ===
In late 1899, Antill was promoted to the rank of major. As part of New South Wales' contribution to the Boer War, he was placed in command of 'A' Squadron, New South Wales Mounted Rifles, and sent overseas. Antill was present during the Battle of Paardeberg, which took place on 18 February 1900. He also took part in securing Pretoria and other operations unil he returned to Australia in January 1901. Two months later, he returned to South Africa, this time serving as the second-in-command of the 2nd New South Wales Mounted Rifles. With this force, he took part in the capture of a Boer convoy under the command of Fedinandus Potgier at the River Vaal. For service in South Africa, Antill was Mentioned in Despatches twice, was appointed a Companion of the Order of the Bath (CB) in 1901, and achieved the brevetted rank of lieutenant colonel.

After returning to Australia, Antill married Marion Wills-Allen in Sydney, on 24 October 1901; the couple had two children. Remaining in the regular forces, he then undertook an instructional role between 1902 and 1904, and then served as Governor General, Henry Northcote's aide de camp between 1904 and 1906. He returned to civilian life in Picton until 1911 when he took up the role of Commandant of the Instructional Staff Schools, based in Albury, New South Wales. In 1913, his marriage broke down. His wife had moved to England, and he applied for a divorce, which was finalised the following year. By April, he had been promoted to the rank of permanent lieutenant colonel.

=== First World War ===
In October 1914, Antill volunteered for overseas service with the Australian Imperial Force. As a regular officer, he was assigned to the 3rd Light Horse Brigade as brigade major, under the command of Colonel Frederic Hughes. He departed for the Middle East on 25 February 1915 on the Transport A16 Star of Victoria, reaching Egypt where the brigade undertook further training. In May, the light horsemen were sent to Anzac Cove as dismounted reinforcements; initially, Antill's brigade undertook mainly defensive duties. However, in an effort to break the deadlock they were committed to the August Offensive. During the fierce fighting at The Nek, Antill, now in temporary command of the brigade, refused a request from the commander of the 10th Light Horse, Lieutenant Colonel Noel Brazier, to cancel the third wave. Hughes had gone forward to observe the attack, leaving Antill in charge. Due to a communications breakdown, Antill believed Hughes had gone forward to lead the brigade forward and therefore ordered the attack to continue. Part of the fourth wave also went over the top, before Brazier and some officers from the 8th Light Horse Regiment reached Hughes in time to call off any further waves. Out of around 500 men committed to the attack, more than half became casualties, with 234 being killed and 138 wounded. Most of those that were killed, died within only a few metres of the Australian trench line having come under heavy, unsuppressed fire.

Antill took over temporary command of the brigade in September 1915 when Hughes became sick and had to be evacuated. Antill remained in command of the brigade until December 1915, when the decision was made by the British high command to evacuate the peninsula. The 3rd Light Horse Brigade were among last troops to withdraw from the position on 20 December 1915.

On 1 January 1916, after the light horse units had returned to Egypt, Antill was promoted to the permanent rank of colonel, and temporary rank of brigadier general. He was also confirmed in his position as commander of 3rd Light Horse. The brigade was placed in the rear and for a time undertook defensive duties along the Suez Canal, occupying No. 2 Section of the defences. On 5 August, after an Ottoman force attacked at Romani, Antill's brigade joined the rest of the ANZAC Mounted Division east of the canal. They arrived too late to take part in the initial fighting although they were later committed to following up the withdrawing Turkish troops. During the Battle of Bir el Ard, Antill's brigade penetrated the Turkish flank and overran the defensive position at Hamisah, taking some 425 prisoners. While reforming after the engagement his regiments began receiving shell fire, and Antill ordered a withdrawal to Nagid, remaining overnight. Antlll's actions removed his brigade from action, and delayed his divisional commander, Major General Harry Chauvel, by several hours that proved costly in terms of consolidating the initial gains.

Only days after Romani, General William Birdwood sent a message requesting Antill take command of an infantry brigade on the Western Front. Antill accepted the offer, and relinquished command of the 3rd Light Horse Brigade to Brigadier General John Royston on 9 August. On arrival in Europe, Antill was given command over the 2nd Infantry Brigade, taking over in September and overseeing operations around Ypres and on the Somme. However, Antill became ill and had to be evacuated to England in November 1916. He returned to duty on 20 March 1917 at which time he assumed command of the 16th Infantry Brigade, which was being raised within the new 6th Division. The brigade was ultimately disbanded without seeing action, and Antill's health deteriorated. As a result, the medical review board refused to clear him for active duty. After failing his final medical examination he ceased his command on 20 September 1917. He returned to Australia shortly afterwards.

For his service during the First World War, Antill was created a Companion of the Order of St Michael and St George in 1916.

== Post-war and later life ==
On his return to Australia, Antill's appointment to the AIF was terminated in December 1917 and he returned to the permanent forces. He subsequently assumed the role of Assistant Adjutant General in 1918. Later that year, he took over as Commandant of the 5th Military District, in South Australia. He held this position until 1921, when he took up the role of Chief Instructor at the Training Depot, based in Liverpool, New South Wales. On 26 January 1924, Antill retired from the military, with the honorary rank of major general. In retirement, he lived in Jarvisfield, Manly and then Dee Why, and undertook a variety of hobbies including gardening, and sports. In 1936, he co-authored a play called The Emancipist with Rose Antill de Warren, about William Redfern.

The final years of his life were spent in ill health, as he was diagnosed with cancer. Antill died on 1 March 1937 at the age of 71. He was cremated. In summarising Antill's character, his biographer Rex Clark in the Australian Dictionary of Biography describes Antill as:

Tall, spare and wiry, brusque in manner and speech, Antill was recognized throughout his career as a courageous soldier, an able leader, a stern disciplinarian and a shrewd judge of men, with a flair for moulding those under his command to his ideal of what a soldier should be. This ideal was in the traditional British pattern.

Ross Mallett's "General Officers of the First AIF" describes him in the following terms:

Brusque of manner and speech, Antill was a courageous soldier, an able leader and above all a stern disciplinarian. Many British officers considered him the very model of what a soldier should be. But in Australia he never escaped his role in those terrible hours at the Nek that became a byword for senseless self-sacrifice and probably never will.
