= Abbotsford, Picton =

Abbotsford
- Location within New South Wales Location within Australia
- 34°09′43″S 150°35′57″E
- Location: Oaks Road, Picton, Wollondilly Shire, New South Wales, Australia

History
- Built: 1822–1908

New South Wales Heritage Register
- Official name: Abbotsford
- Type: State heritage (complex / group)
- Designated: 2 April 1999
- Reference no.: 73
- Type: Homestead Complex
- Category: Farming and Grazing

Abbotsford is a heritage-listed former farm and residence and now vacant building located at Oaks Road in the town of Picton, in the Macarthur region of New South Wales, Australia. It was built from 1822 to 1908. It was added to the New South Wales State Heritage Register on 2 April 1999.

== History ==
=== Picton ===
The town of Picton was named by Major Antill after Sir Thomas Picton in 1841. The location was previously known as "Stonequarry". The Duke of Wellington described Picton as a "rough foul-mouthed devil as ever lived" but very capable. He was "respected for his courage and feared for his irrascible temperament". He was chiefly remembered for his exploits under Wellington in the Iberinan Peninsular War displaying great bravery and persistence. He was killed at the Battle of Waterloo and was the most senior officer to die there. He was buried in the family vault at St. George's, Hanover Square in London. In 1859 Picton was re-interred in St. Paul's Cathedral, London, lying close to the body of the Duke of Wellington.

=== Abbotsford ===
The 162-hectare (400-acre) property was taken up in 1822 by George Harper, natural history collector, settler, noted Scottish government official and surveyor. The main block of the house may have been built before Harper made his trip to England in 1827. The ornamental plantings include relatively rare species of horticultural interest and are thought to have been planted by George Harper. The rest of the house was built before his death at Abbotsford in 1841.

Purchased by William Redfern Antill, local Magistrate and prominent early settler in 1865. Abbotsford House was built c. 1908.

The original access road to Abbotsford House extended in a straight line from the Abbotsford crossing of Race Course Creek. The timber truss Abbotsford Bridge was built c. 1908. It was handed over to the Wollondilly Shire Council by the NSW Public Works Department. New works in commenced in 1985 and the original bridge was demolished in 1986.It was replaced with present concrete road bridge c. 1986.

The property remained with the Antill family until 1952. The house was considered to be a remarkable survival of a farmhouse from an early period of Australia's settlement.

In the late 1970s it was reported as being virtually unchanged since the middle years of the last century except for the loss of the original ceilings. Neglect, and two separate fires over the following decade, led to its state of dereliction.

== Description ==
=== Site/grounds/garden ===
The main components of the group are:

- House (now ruins) (WO0108)
- Trees, Gardens & Grounds (WO0109)
- Underground Water Storage Tank (WO110)
- Cottage & Brick Outhouse (now ruins) (WO0111).

==== Site/grounds ====
The original access or carriageway probably started at the Chinese funeral cypress (Cupressus funebris) south of the present entrance gate and continued in a line parallel to the present drive. This old line is marked by a regular linear depression in the grass and a double line of European trees, two Lombardy poplars (Populus nigra 'Italica'), a hoop pine (Araucaria cunninghamii ), a kurrajong (Brachychiton populneus), another cypress and bunya pine (Araucaria bidwillii). Other European trees mark sites such as a possible former croquet lawn and orchards. The ornamental plantings include relatively rare species of horticultural interest and are thought to have been planted by George Harper. A line some 600 metres (2,000 ft) long remains, containing a number of exotic species: a discontinuous series of fairly random plantings, including a Chinese funeral cypress, bunya pine, field elm (Ulmus campestris), kurrajong, cypress and a hoop pine. A solitary specimen of Photinia x serrulata (a Chinese hedging shrub) also remains.

==== Abbotsford Bridge site ====
It is the site of the original timber trestle bridge over Racecourse Creek, at the site of Abbotsford crossing. The timber bridge was replaced with the present concrete road bridge c. 1986. The location of the earlier Abbotsford bridge and crossing is significant because knowledge of its position contributes to the understanding of the siting of Abbotsford House and its driveway avenue plantings in relation to the Oaks Rd and Abbotsford Road.

==== Grounds/garden ====
The mature trees and remnants of the gardens and grounds of the Abbotsford property have scientific significance as a collection of rare species of horticultural interest and their association with George Harper who was a noted natural history collector. Together with the other components of the Abbotsford group, the plantings provide evidence of the structure and layout of the farm estate. In a wider context, the surviving plantings also illustrate the horticultural practice of plant collecting which was to remain an important influence in the development of gardens of the colony for a substantial period of time. Today, the trees are a landmark and contribute to the character of the rural landscape north-west of Picton.

The listing includes all trees and buildings on the land from road to hill top.

==== Buildings ====
===== House (now ruins) (WO0108) =====
A colonial Georgian brick house with front verandah, the main block being flanked by slightly later ones which at the rear form a U-shaped verandah court with the centre block. The whole is raised on a terrace at the front which is unusual. The main block is double pile plan and the elevation is five bays wide under a hip roof of shingles covered with corrugated galvanised iron. Internal detailing is intact.

Originally a Colonial Georgian, one storey house flanked by later gabled pavilions forming a U-shaped verandahed courtyard with the whole raised on a high terrace at the front. Face brick on rubble foundation for main block. Two brick outbuildings are associated with house; one containing a kitchen and servants' quarters, the other a smokehouse. Twice destroyed by fire in last decade and main building now derelict.

The ruins of the main Abbotsford farmhouse are significant for their associations with the settlement of the area and the links with the Harper and Antill families. The architectural value and intactness of the house as an early homestead has been lost. The ruins, together with the other components of the property, provide an opportunity to interpret an early pastoral property through archaeological investigation. The ruins are also an evocative part of the Abbotsford group which is a landmark in the rural surrounds of Picton.

===== Cottage & Brick Outhouse (WO0111) =====
The cottage was used as servants' quarters and the brick outhouse as a smokehouse. These domestic buildings are thought to date to the mid 19th century.

===== Convict Barracks/Old Gaol (demolished) =====
Together with the main residence these two buildings and the jail (now demolished) were positioned around a central court with a deliberate axial relationship to the hill, the driveway and selected trees.

===== Underground Water Storage Tank (WO110) =====
A large brick tank about 3 metres (9.8 ft) in diameter.

==== Archaeological and other elements ====
As well as the water storage tank there are other sites considered to be of archaeological interest. They are the site of the "Old Gaol" or Convict Barracks, a line of stones adjacent to the existing timber barns and the remains of a floor surface (LEP). The ruins, together with the other components of the property, provide an opportunity to interpret an early pastoral property through archaeological investigation. The ruins are also an evocative part of the Abbotsford group which is a landmark in the rural surrounds of Picton.

=== Condition ===
As of 27 March 2012, a large brick tank about 3 metres (9.8 ft) in diameter, internally rendered and capped with a brick dome, still holds water. As well as the underground water storage tank there are other sites considered to be of archaeological interest. They are the site of the "Old Gaol" or Convict Barracks, a line of stones adjacent to the existing timber barns and the remains of a floor surface.

=== Modifications and dates ===
- 1985 – the original access road to Abbotsford House extended in a straight line from the Abbotsford crossing of Race Course Creek. New works commenced in 1985.
- 1986 – the 1908 L timber trestle bridge was demolished. It was the site of original bridge over Racecourse Creek, at the site of Abbotsford crossing.

== Heritage listing ==
As at 27 March 2012, the Abbotsford property is significant because of its associations with the early settlement of the Picton area and its links with prominent colonial figure, George Harper and later, the Antill family. In addition to its historical significance the site has the potential to yield further evidence of the working of this important pastoral estate through archaeological investigation. The Abbotsford cottage and brick outbuilding are significant for their contribution to the understanding of the function and layout of the group as a whole.

The architectural value and intactness of the house as an early homestead has been lost. The ruins, together with the other components of the property, provide an opportunity to interpret an early pastoral property through archaeological investigation. The ruins are also an evocative part of the Abbotsford group which is a landmark in the rural surrounds of Picton.

The mature trees and remnants of the gardens and grounds of the Abbotsford property have scientific significance as a collection of rare species of horticultural interest and their association with George Harper who was a noted natural history collector. Together with the other components of the Abbotsford group, the plantings provide evidence of the structure and layout of the farm estate. In a wider context, the surviving plantings also illustrate the horticultural practice of plant collecting which was to remain an important influence in the development of gardens of the colony for a substantial period of time. Today, the trees are a landmark and contribute to the character of the rural landscape north-west of Picton.

The mid-19th century cottage and brick outbuilding are significant from their contribution to the understanding of the function and layout of the homestead group.

The underground water tank at Abbotsford is significant through its contribution to our understanding of the group as a whole. It is considered to be a potential source for archaeological research into the occupation phases of the site as domestic artefacts are often dropped into wells. Other sites are also considered to have archaeological significance, particularly into the earliest phases of the development of the property and the role of convicts.

The location of the earlier Abbotsford bridge and crossing is significant because knowledge of its position contributes to the understanding of the siting of Abbotsford House and its driveway avenue plantings in relation to the Oaks Rd and Abbotsford Road.

Abbotsford was listed on the New South Wales State Heritage Register on 2 April 1999.
