= Stonequarry Creek railway viaduct, Picton =

Stonequarry Creek railway viaduct
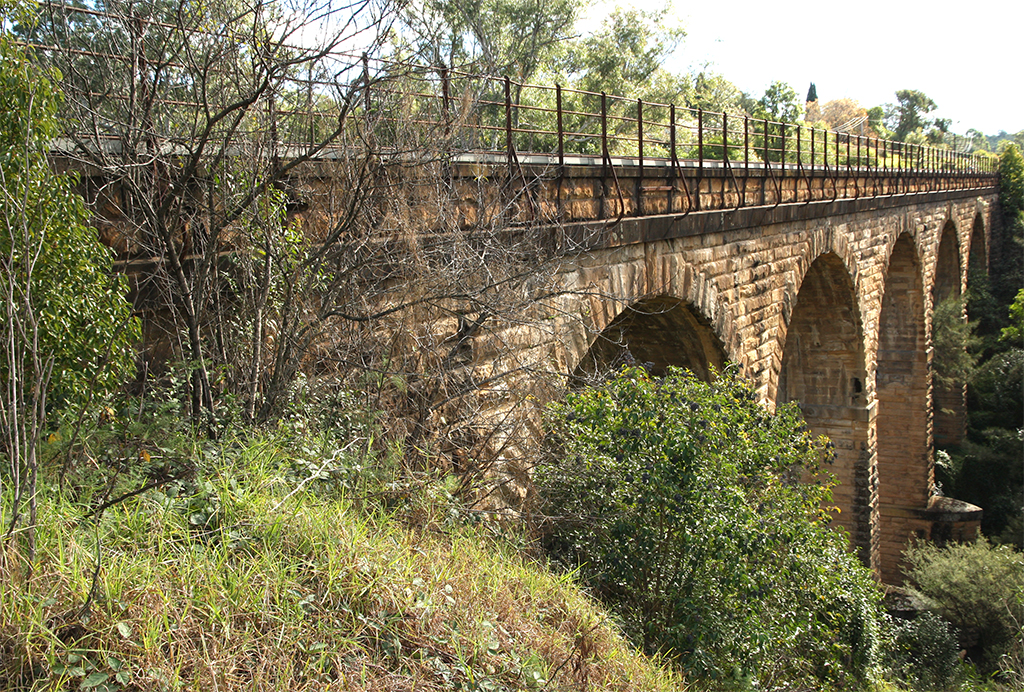
- The viaduct, pictured in 2010
- Coordinates: 34°10′40″S 150°36′42″E
- Carries: Main Southern line
- Crosses: Stonequarry Creek
- Locale: Picton, Wollondilly Shire, New South Wales, Australia
- Official name: Stonequarry Creek Railway Viaduct; Picton railway viaduct over Stonequarry Creek
- Owner: Transport Asset Manager of New South Wales

Characteristics
- Design: Arch viaduct
- Material: Sandstone
- Pier construction: Other stone and quarry fill
- Total length: 84 metres (276 ft)
- Longest span: 12 metres (39 ft)
- No. of spans: 5
- Clearance below: 24 metres (79 ft)
- No. of lanes: 2

History
- Engineering design by: John Whitton
- Constructed by: Murnin and Brown
- Construction start: 1863
- Construction end: 1867
- Construction cost: A£10,437

New South Wales Heritage Register
- Official name: Picton railway viaduct over Stonequarry Creek; Stonequarry Creek Railway Viaduct; Picton Viaduct
- Type: State heritage (built)
- Designated: 2 April 1999
- Reference no.: 1051
- Type: Railway Bridge/Viaduct
- Category: Transport – Rail
- Builders: Murnin and Brown

Location
- Interactive map of Stonequarry Creek railway viaduct

Stonequarry Creek railway viaduct is a heritage-listed railway viaduct over the Stonequarry Creek located on the Main Southern railway in the South Western Sydney town of Picton in the Wollondilly Shire local government area of New South Wales, Australia. It was designed by John Whitton as the Engineer-in-Chief for Railways and was built from 1863 to 1867 by Murnin and Brown. It is also known as Stonequarry Creek Railway Viaduct and Picton railway viaduct over Stonequarry Creek. The property is owned by the Transport Asset Manager of New South Wales, an agency of the Government of New South Wales. It was added to the New South Wales State Heritage Register on 2 April 1999.

== History ==
=== Picton ===
The town of Picton was named by Major Henry Colden Antill after Sir Thomas Picton in 1841. The location was previously known as "Stonequarry". The Duke of Wellington described Picton as a "rough foul-mouthed devil as ever lived" but very capable. He was "respected for his courage and feared for his irrascible temperament". He was chiefly remembered for his exploits under Wellington in the Iberian Peninsula War displaying great bravery and persistence. He was killed at the Battle of Waterloo and was the most senior officer to die there. He was buried in the family vault at St. George's, Hanover Square in London. In 1859 Picton was re-interred in St. Paul's Cathedral, London, lying close to the body of the Duke of Wellington.

=== Railway viaduct ===
The Stonequarry Creek railway viaduct was built for the Picton to Goulburn railway extension, constructed from 1862–1869.

John Whitton signed the plans in July 1862 but the first contractor failed so Murnin and Brown took over the contract in December 1863. The work was supervised by George Cowdery (a future Engineer-in-Chief for Existing Lines) and was opened for traffic on 28 February 1867 for the first section of extension to Mittagong. It cost A£10,437.

It is the oldest railway arch bridge in New South Wales and the first one built for two tracks, the second is over James Street, Lithgow. Economic constraints forced Whitton to build the others for single track. They were progressively bypassed by double track brick arch bridges whereas Stonequarry Creek viaduct continues its original function.

The viaduct is accessible from Menangle Street via Webster Street.

== Description ==
A sandstone viaduct carrying the double track Main South Railway (also known as the Great Southern Railway) over Stonequarry Creek just south of Picton railway station. It is south of the station in terms of the general direction of the line, although it is actually north of the station because the line runs north at this point.

There are five arches of 12 metres (40 ft) clear span which together with pier widths and abutments gives the viaduct a total length of 84 metres (276 ft). The middle arch is the highest above the creek bed at 24 metres (78 ft).

The piers are solid stone, founded at shollw depth into rock, tapering to the springing levels of the arches which are solid semi-circular, 6 metres (20 ft) radius and 1 metre (2 ft 6 in) thick.

At the piers, the internal "V" formed by the adjoining arches is filled by stone rubble to about 5 metres (15 ft) and dished to form a drain. There is a pipe drain down the middle which dishcharges at the springing level. By this arrangement the ballastered tracks are drained and do not get water logged.

There is a low stone parapet wall on each side of the viaduct supplemented by a timber fence for the safety of train shunters.

The abutments are U-shaped in plan with three internal buttresses.

=== Condition ===
As at 15 March 2006, the viaduct is in excellent condition and carries rail traffic that is considerably heavier and faster than when built. No strengthening works or modification have been necessary. The viaduct retains its original fabric and function.

=== Modifications and dates ===
There have been only minor railway attachments to suit changing operations over the years, but those that remain do not detract from the significance of the bridge.

== Heritage listing ==
As at 15 March 2006, this 1867 viaduct is significant because it is the oldest stone arch railway bridge in New South Wales. It is associated with John Whitton the "father of new South Railways", it is an imposing sandstone structure, a landmark for the historic town of Picton, its construction contributed significantly to the subsequent railway extension to Albury in 1883 to link with the Victorian line and to the development of Southern Western New South Wales and when John Whitton was denied funds to continue with the expensive wrought iron girder bridges he chose the stone arch viaduct for his major bridge works. It has proved to be a most cost-effective structure. It is unique being the first double track stone arch viaduct and retains its original fabric and function. It represents a major technological achievement in the construction of the Great Southern Railway line by John Whitton.

Picton railway viaduct over Stonequarry Creek was listed on the New South Wales State Heritage Register on 2 April 1999 having satisfied the following criteria.

The place is important in demonstrating the course, or pattern, of cultural or natural history in New South Wales.

This viaduct is the oldest stone arch railway bridge in New South Wales. It is still in use without any restriction on railway operations.

The place has a strong or special association with a person, or group of persons, of importance of cultural or natural history of New South Wales's history.

It is associated with John Whitton the "father of New South Wales railways".

The place is important in demonstrating aesthetic characteristics and/or a high degree of creative or technical achievement in New South Wales.

The viaduct is an imposing sandstone structure, a landmark for the historic town of Picton and a photo stop for tourist.

The place has a strong or special association with a particular community or cultural group in New South Wales for social, cultural or spiritual reasons.

Its construction contributed significantly to the railway extension to Albury to link with the Victorian line and to the development of South Western New South Wales. It continues as a major item of railway infrastructure for the commercial and social wellbeing of that region and for land transport to Melbourne.

The place has potential to yield information that will contribute to an understanding of the cultural or natural history of New South Wales.

When John Whitton was denied funds to continue with the expensive wrought iron girder bridges he chose the stone arch viaduct for his major bridge works. The former at Menangle cost £94,562 whereas the Stonequarry Creek viaduct cost £10,437. It has proved to be a most cost-effective structure.

This viaduct was a prelude to his extensive use of stone arch viaducts across the Blue Mountains to Lithgow.

The place possesses uncommon, rare or endangered aspects of the cultural or natural history of New South Wales.

The only double track stone arch viaduct.

The place is important in demonstrating the principal characteristics of a class of cultural or natural places/environments in New South Wales.

It is a representative example of a railway bridge built during 1862-69.

== See also ==
- List of railway bridges in New South Wales
- Historic bridges of New South Wales
