= Lennox Bridge, Glenbrook =

Historic road bridge in the Blue Mountains, New South Wales, Australia

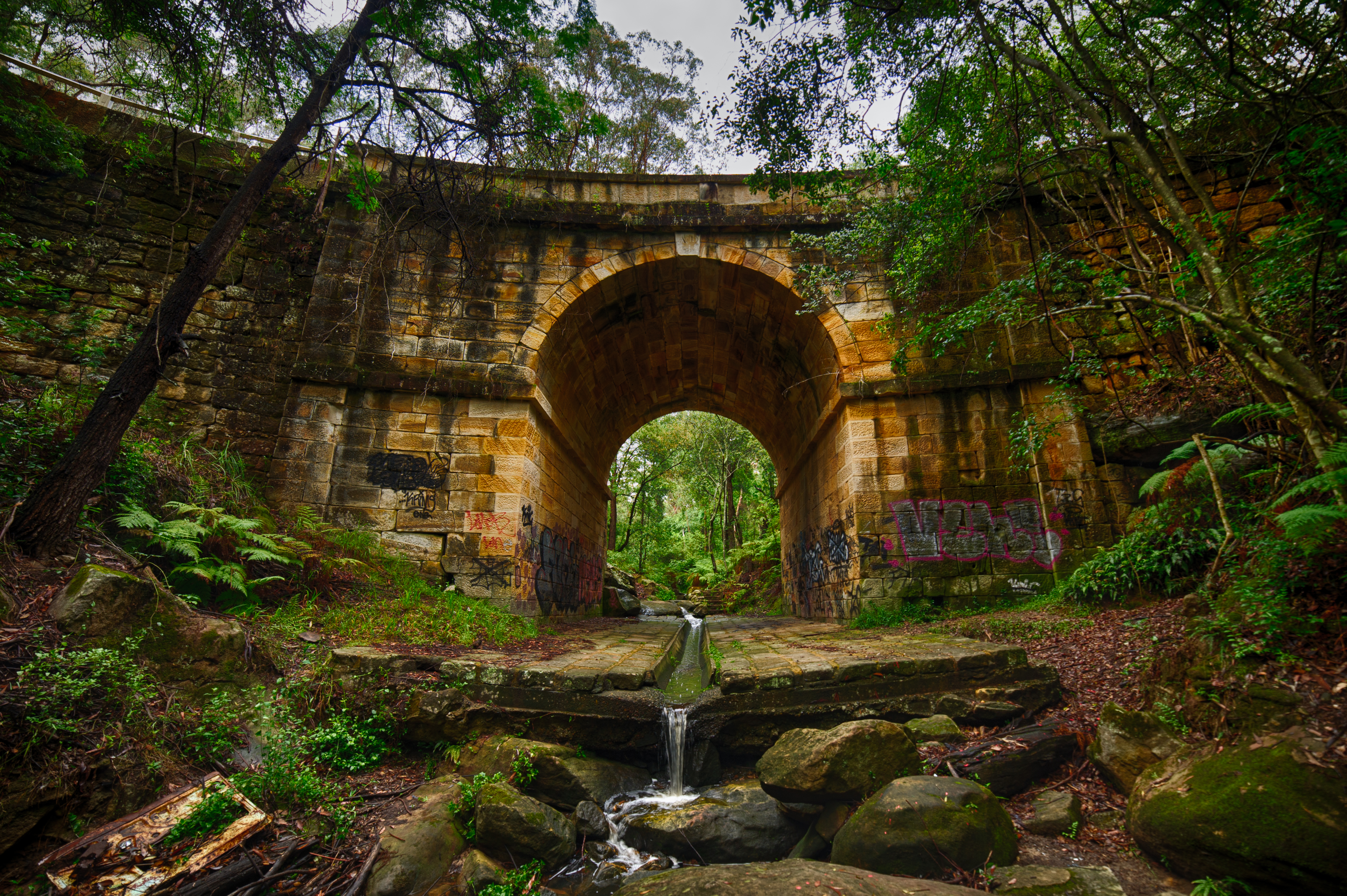
- The oldest surviving stone arch bridge on the Australian mainland
- Coordinates: 33°45′15″S 150°37′56″E
- Carries: Light motor vehicles; Pedestrians; Bicycles
- Crosses: Brookside Creek; Lapstone Creek
- Locale: Glenbrook, Blue Mountains, New South Wales, Australia
- Begins: Glenbrook (west bound)
- Ends: Lapstone (west bound)
- Other names: Lennox Bridge; The Horseshoe Bridge
- Named for: David Lennox
- Maintained by: Blue Mountains City Council

Characteristics
- Design: Arch bridge
- Material: Stone
- Width: 9 m (30 ft)
- Height: 9 m (30 ft) (at highest point)
- Longest span: 6 m (20 ft)
- No. of spans: 1
- Load limit: 2 t (2.2 short tons; 2.0 long tons)

History
- Architect: Thomas Mitchell
- Construction start: 1832
- Construction end: 1833
- Opened: 1833; 193 years ago
- Closed: 1967-1982

New South Wales Heritage Register
- Official name: Lennox Bridge
- Type: State heritage (built)
- Criteria: a., b., c., f., g.
- Designated: 2 April 1999
- Reference no.: 24
- Type: Road Bridge
- Category: Transport - Land
- Builders: James Randall and other convicts

Location
- Interactive map of Lennox Bridge, Glenbrook

The Lennox Bridge, Glenbrook is a heritage-listed road bridge that carries the Mitchell's Pass across Brookside Creek (also known as Lapstone Creek), located at Glenbrook, in the City of Blue Mountains local government area of New South Wales, Australia. The bridge was designed by David Lennox and built from 1832 to 1833 by James Randall and other convicts. It is also known as Lennox Bridge or The Horseshoe Bridge. The property is owned by Blue Mountains City Council. It was added to the New South Wales State Heritage Register on 2 April 1999. The stone arch bridge is a single arch of 6 metres (20 ft) span and is 9 metres (30 ft) above water level, with a road width of 9 metres (30 ft).

== History ==
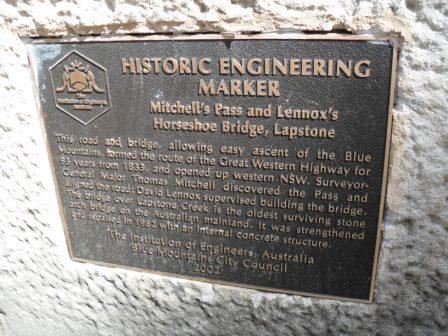
Lennox Bridge plaque

The first road up the eastern slopes of the Blue Mountains, built by William Cox (1814–15), was in Governor Macquarie's words "pretty steep and sharp" and was found to be subject to serious washways. This road was superseded in 1824 by what was known as the Bathurst Road (now Old Bathurst Road). It avoided watercourses, but its grade was very steep and this rendered it hazardous to travellers. When Major Thomas Mitchell was appointed as Surveyor General in 1828, one of the first matters to which he turned his attention was the improvement of the Great Western Road. Mitchell's attention was focussed on providing a more direct and easily graded route for the Great Western Road. Mitchell surveyed and recommended the construction of a road along this route midway between the other two in preference to the Governor's suggestion of stationing a permanent repair gang on the Old Bathurst Road.

'Mr David Lennox, who left his stone wall at my request, and with his sleeves still tucked up, came with me to my office, and undertook to plan the stone bridges required, make the centring arches and to carry on such works by directing and instructing the common labourers then at the disposal of the NSW Government.'

— Surveyor General Thomas Mitchell, Letter to Perry, 22 March 1833.

And on 1 October 1832, only seven weeks after his arrival in the colony, Lennox was appointed (subject to London's confirmation) Sub-Inspector of Bridges in New South Wales. His first task was to plan and organise the spanning of Lapstone Creek on Mitchell's Pass. By early November 1832, he and his selected twenty convicts; with suitable experience had opened a quarry near the creek, had cut a number of stone blocks and were ready to start building operations. The design called for a horseshoe shape to give optimum strength.

By March 1833, the experimental bridge was so far advanced that Mitchell had to decide what should be carved on the keystones. He agreed that on the upstream side (the south side), the inscription should commemorate the man he had chosen so percipiently, so the masons carved "DAVID LENNOX", while on the north side they carved "AD 1833". There has been weathering on the south side but the AD1833 stone is still in very good condition.

Lennox Bridge, opened in 1833, is the oldest surviving stone arch bridge on the Australian mainland. It crosses Brookside Creek (also known as Lapstone Creek) on the road known as Mitchell's Pass. It replaced an earlier crossing of the creek 600 metres (2,000 ft) further south, which today survives as a walking track. A nearby quarry is thought to have been created for the purpose of providing stone for the bridge.

A small crack appeared beside the arch but Lennox advised against taking any remedial action. The bridge remained very robust and carried increasingly heavy traffic as the Great Road to the west became busier. The success of the railway after 1867 diverted much transport business away from the road until the twentieth century and advent of the motor vehicle. Mitchell's Pass began to bear more traffic than was comfortable for Lenox Bridge, although the conversion of Knapsack Viaduct from a trail line to a road bridge in 1926 opened a new road route up the Monocline and at last diverted much of the traffic from Mitchell's Pass.

Mitchell's Pass continued to be used, however, and by 1975 it was plain that substantial works were necessary to secure the safety of Lennox Bridge. Restoration works took place in 1976. The bridge served the main route to the Blue Mountains for 93 years until 1926, when the Great Western Highway was re-routed via the Knapsack Viaduct. It was closed in 1967 but later strengthened and repaired with an internal concrete structure and it re-opened in 1982.

== Description ==
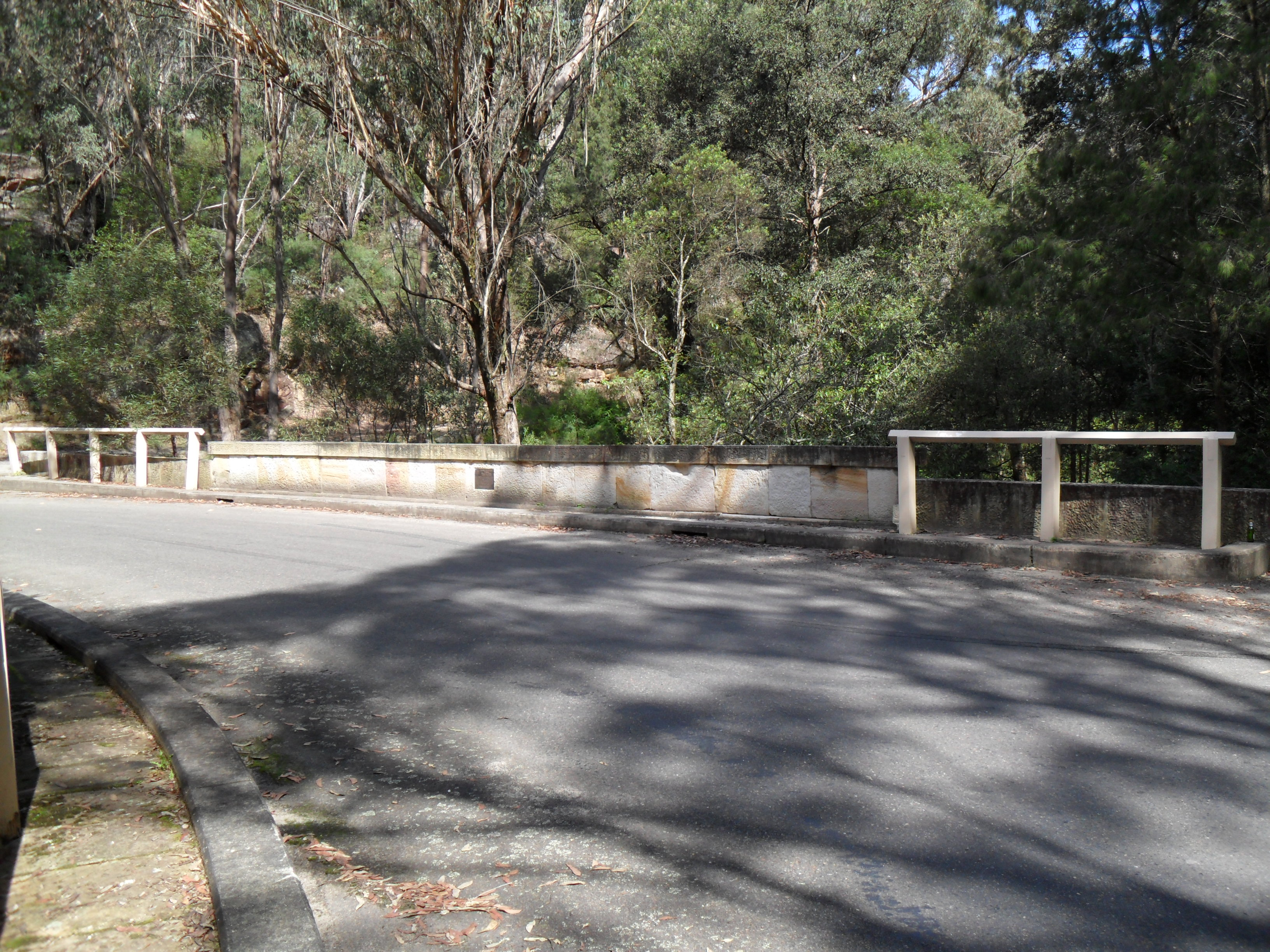
Roadway surface of the Lennox Bridge, viewed from the west end

Lennox Bridge spans the deep gully of Lapstone Creek at the head of the steepest part of Mitchell's Pass. The foundations are on bedrock, with the water running through a channel cut by Lennox's convicts in the bed of the creek. The bridge is quite small, with a span of only 6 metres (20 ft). The single arch is built of ashlared stone blocks mortared together. The arch on the south side has a keystone bearing the inscription "DAVID LENNOX", on the north side, "AD 1833", the packing of the bridge to either hand of the main ashlared section is of coursed rubble revetments, making the total length of the bridge carriageway of almost 14 metres (47 ft). The stone parapets are laid above a projecting plinth which begins just above the keystones. The area between the curve of the arch and the horizontal carriageway was packed with small rubble stone.

There was originally a damp-proof lime-mortar course above the vaulting, but this, together with most of the packing, was removed when the bridge was stripped back to the arch in 1976. During these repairs new concrete supports were inserted to bear the weight of a new carriageway utilising steel girders to take the traffic then still using Mitchell's Pass. These changes are not visible, but the insertion of new blocks of stone and repairs to existing blocks on the main arch are legible. The original stone-cut channel for the creek still exists but is obscured by a concrete channel poured within Lennox's work during the 1976 repairs. Since Mitchell's Pass ceased to take the heavy traffic over the Blue Mountains, via the former Knapsack Railway Viaduct, the road is now one-way only downhill from Lennox Bridge and the traffic is largely for tourist purposes. There is a small amount of car-parking space beside the bridge and a concrete stairwell and path down to the creek on the west side. The visitor can safely walk under the bridge obtain the most attractive views.

=== Condition ===
As at 28 November 2013, the physical condition was good. The bridge retains a high degree of original fabric. 1976 restorations do not detract from the significance of the built heritage item.

=== Modifications and dates ===
The road was closed, the carriageway removed and the bridge stripped down to its bare stone arch in 1976. The Department of Main Roads decided that the stress had to be removed from the original arch and reconstructed the carriageway so that it was supported on two new concrete walls and borne on horizontal steel girders. With other repairs to the stonework and to the channel for the creek under the bridge, the road was reopened in 1976 with the new work largely concealed from view. With much reduced traffic flow and the road to the plains from the bridge made one-way only (downhill), the Lennox Bridge continues to serve as the oldest stone bridge on the Australian Mainland.

== Heritage listing ==
As at 28 November 2013, Lennox Bridge was the oldest stone bridge on the Australian mainland. It commands significance respect as the design of a newly arrived Scottish stone-mason, David Lennox, handpicked by the percipient Surveyor General Thomas Mitchell and as the work of some twenty diligent, efficient, tightly supervised and technically able convicts. It was a necessary part of the road communications between Sydney and the West for over a century and proved remarkably durable. Its historical significance is augmented by its aesthetic and technical values. The original bridge, on a horseshoe curve, was daring, experimental and remarkably attractive; despite significant restoration work in 1976 the structure has retained a high degree of its original fabric and is in good condition. The work did not detracted from the aesthetic and technical values inherit in the design and fabric of the bridge. It has State Significance as the oldest bridge permitting vehicle transport on a route essential to the state's development.

Lennox Bridge, Blaxland was listed on the New South Wales State Heritage Register on 2 April 1999 having satisfied the following criteria.

The place is important in demonstrating the course, or pattern, of cultural or natural history in New South Wales.

Lennox Bridge is the oldest stone bridge on the Australian mainland. It commands respect as the design of a newly arrived Scottish stone-mason handpicked by the Surveyor General Thomas Mitchell and as the work of some twenty diligent, efficient, tightly supervised and technically able convicts. It was necessary part of the road communications between Sydney and the West for over a century and proved remarkably durable. It has State significance as the oldest bridge permitting vehicle transport on a route essential to the state's development.

The place has a strong or special association with a person, or group of persons, of importance of cultural or natural history of New South Wales's history.

David Lennox was born at Ayr, in Scotland in 1788. At forty-five years of age Lennox began service under Major Mitchell. Prior to arriving in the Colony he had spent seventeen years on public works executed at the expense of the British Government. During this time he constructed a number of wooden bridges associated with the Gloucester-Berkeley Canal and a stone bridge near Gloucester. In 1832, two years after the death of his wife, Lennox arrived on the Colony on the Florentia. Not long after his arrival, he was discovered by Major Mitchell. On 1 October 1832, following the review of his credentials, Lennox was appointed to the Roads Department as the Sub-Inspector of Bridges. Within six weeks of his appointment Lennox and his men had cut most of the stone and procured lime for mortar. By July 1833, the bridge was complete. The success of Lennox's design is demonstrated through its on-going stability and continued use. Major restoration and safety improvement work was not required until the 1950s.

Lennox Bridge is also associated with at least twenty convicts, an overseer, a constable and an armed sentry that worked on the site between October 1832 and July 1833, the construction gang worked from 7am to 4pm, when they returned to their stockade at Emu Plains. The work involved stone cutting and setting, carpentry and masonry required to construct the bridge. Following completion of the bridge Lennox requested to retain the: services of eight convicts: William Brady, John Carsons, Robert Hyams, John Johnson, Patrick Malowney (Maloney), Thomas Nelson, James Randall and Daniel Williams. The sentences of six of the eight convicts were remitted. The remaining two were reduced after a further six months of work.

The place is important in demonstrating aesthetic characteristics and/or a high degree of creative or technical achievement in New South Wales.

The original bridge, on a horse-shoe curve, was experimental. The stonework has been restored and some infelicities have been allowed on the revetment. Changes made in 1976 introduced concrete to the stone-cut water channel beneath the bridge.

The place has potential to yield information that will contribute to an understanding of the cultural or natural history of New South Wales.

The bridge was carried on a single semi-circular stone arch of ten feet radius. The roadway was thirty feet wide at the crown of the arch and the same height above the bed or the gully. After bearing over one hundred and seventy years of traffic and one major restoration still stands stable. The bridge is a very fine example of the work of David Lennox and represents the first scientifically constructed stone arched bridge of its magnitude In Australia.

The place possesses uncommon, rare or endangered aspects of the cultural or natural history of New South Wales.

Lennox Bridge is exceptionally rare. No other bridges of similar age or design have survived on the Australian mainland.

The place is important in demonstrating the principal characteristics of a class of cultural or natural places/environments in New South Wales.

Lennox Bridge is the oldest scientifically constructed stone arch bridge on the Australian mainland. Having gained his bridge construction experience before arriving in the colony it is highly representative of the techniques used to construct stone bridges at the time in England.

== Engineering heritage award ==
The bridge received a Historic Engineering Marker from Engineers Australia as part of its Engineering Heritage Recognition Program.

== See also ==
- Mitchell's Causeway
- Historic bridges of New South Wales
- List of bridges in Australia
