= Clifford Love Bridge =

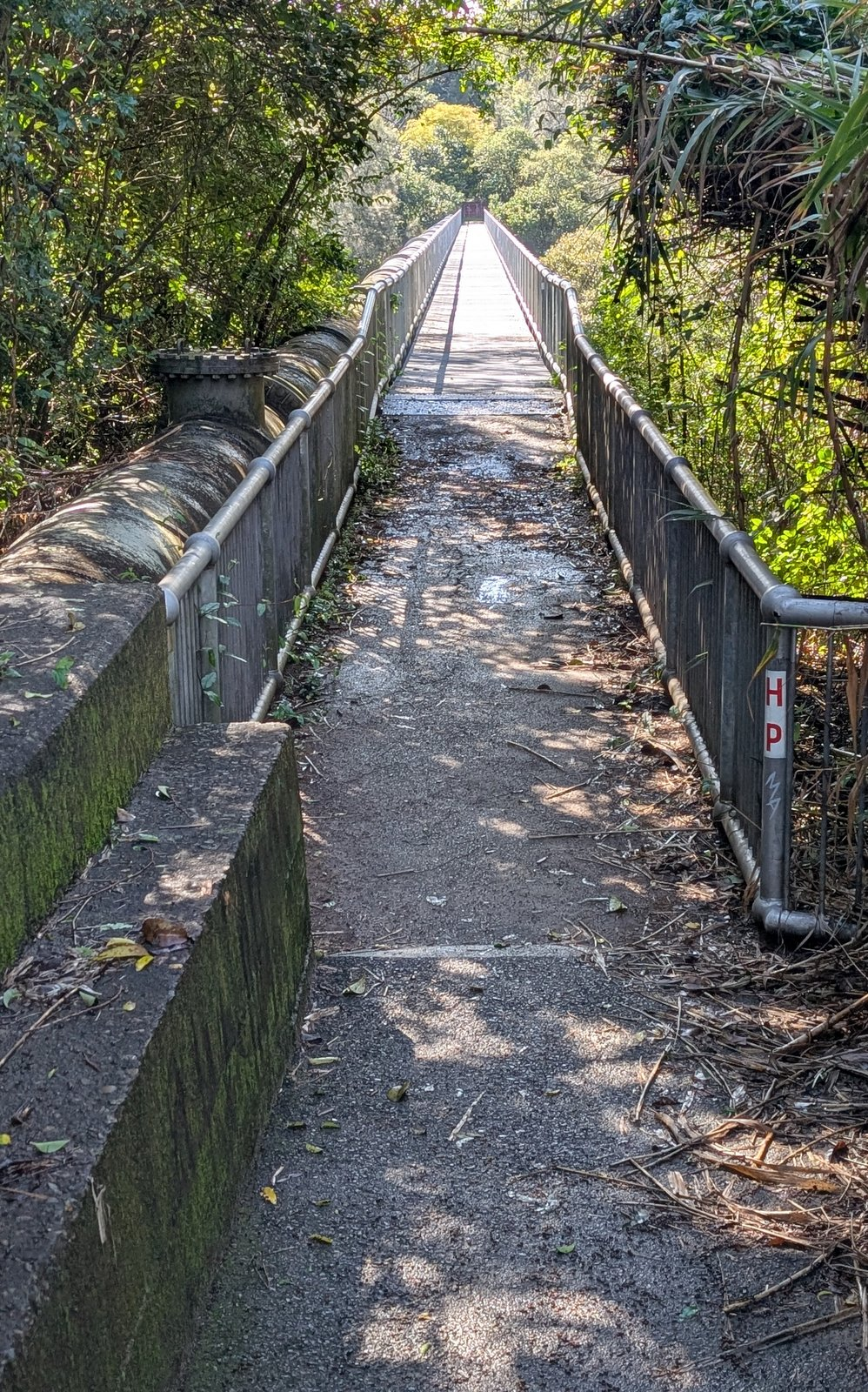
- Coordinates: 33°48′10″S 151°08′38″E
- Crosses: Lane Cove River
- Locale: Lane Cove West & North Ryde, Sydney, Australia

Characteristics
- Total length: 150 metres

History
- Opened: 1902

Location
- Interactive map of Clifford Love Bridge

The Clifford Love Bridge is a foot bridge that carries the Great North Walk and a water pipe across the Lane Cove River in Lane Cove West, Sydney, Australia. The bridge was completed in 1902 and has two steel arch spans of 57.9 metres.

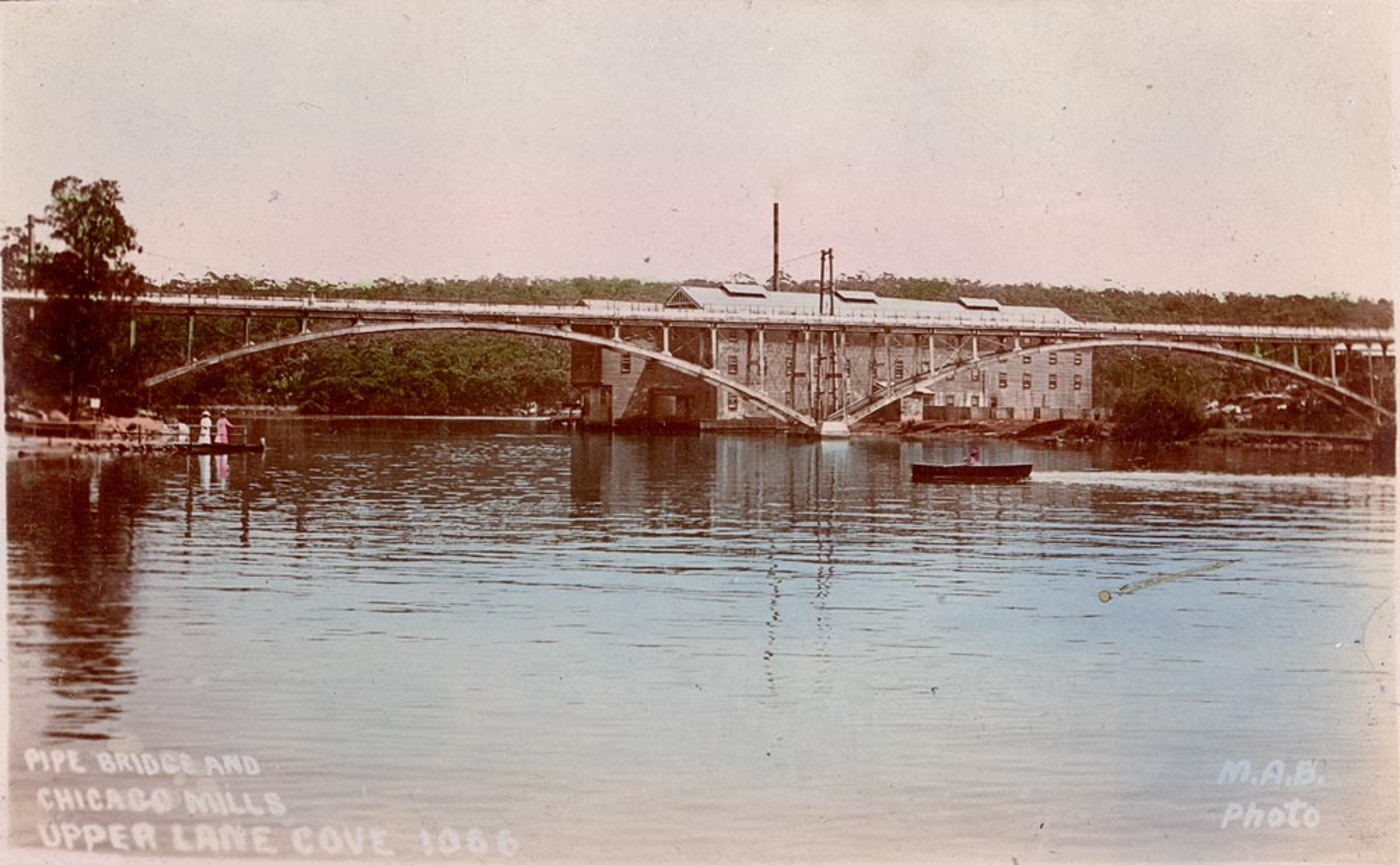
historical image

== See also ==
- List of bridges in Sydney
