= Harry Lassetter =

Australian Army general (1860–1926)

Brigadier-General Henry Lassetter CB CMG
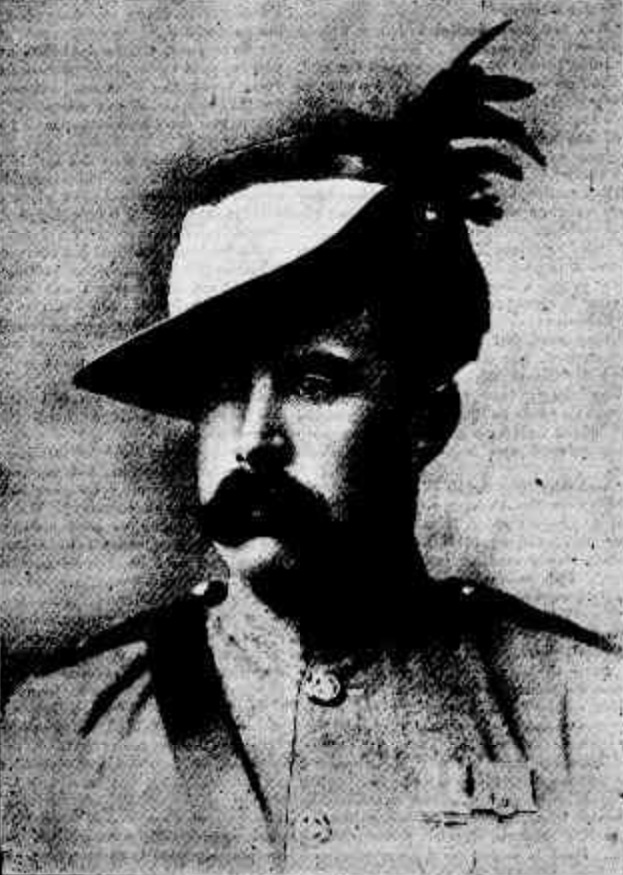
- Lassetter as officer commanding New South Wales Mounted Infantry, 1890
- Born: 19 March 1860; Edgecliff, New South Wales
- Died: 17 February 1926 (aged 65); Potts Point, New South Wales
- Military career
- Allegiance: United Kingdom; Australia
- Branch: British Army; Australian Army
- Service years: 1880–1919
- Rank: Brigadier-General
- Commands: 2nd Light Horse Brigade (1904–06); 6th Light Horse Brigade (1903–04); 2nd New South Wales Mounted Rifles (1901–02); New South Wales Mounted Rifles (1892–98); Permanent Mounted Infantry Company (1888–92)
- Conflicts: Nile Expedition; Second Boer War; First World War
- Awards: Companion of the Order of the Bath; Companion of the Order of St Michael and St George; Mentioned in Despatches

Brigadier-General Henry Beauchamp Lassetter, CB, CMG (19 March 1860 – 17 February 1926) was an Australian military officer and businessman.

== Early life ==
Lassetter, the son of Frederic Lassetter, a prominent merchant, was born at Edgecliff, a suburb of Sydney. Educated in England, he attended Cheltenham College, Eton, and the Royal Military College, Sandhurst.

== Military career ==
In 1880 Lassetter was commissioned a second lieutenant in the 38th Regiment, becoming lieutenant in the 80th Regiment in 1881. He was involved in an expedition to the Nile in 1884 and was promoted captain in 1887 and major in 1888, when he trained the New South Wales Mounted Rifle Brigade. He commanded the Permanent New South Wales Mounted Infantry Company from 1888 until 1892, when it was disbanded. He then raised the New South Wales Mounted Infantry as a part-time unit spread across New South Wales and commanded it until 1896. It was retitled the New South Wales Mounted Rifles in 1893. Lassetter was promoted to lieutenant colonel in 1895, and led the Australian detachment at Queen Victoria's Diamond Jubilee. He was on the Reserve of Officers in New South Wales in 1898 and 1899, reactivating at the time of the Second Boer War. He was involved in training of the early New South Wales contingents to South Africa and was offered command of the New South Wales Citizens Bushmen in 1900 but declined due to business commitments. He later commanded the 2nd New South Wales Mounted Rifles in the Boer War (1901–02). For his service in the war, he was mentioned in despatches and created a Companion of the Order of the Bath in the October 1902 South African Honours list. Following the regiment's return to Sydney in July 1902, he received a sword of honour from the troopers of his regiment in recognition of his services, presented in a ceremony by the Premier Sir John See.

In 1911 he became managing director of his father's firm, but he remained primarily involved in the military and took command of a territorial brigade in England in 1915, where he was promoted brigadier general and created Companion of the Order of St Michael and St George in 1917.

== Family ==
He married Elisabeth Anne Antill (1871–1927), a sister of Brigadier General John M. Antill, on 19 August 1891. They had a son, Frederic Macquarie Antill Lassetter (1892–1940). Both Elisabeth and Frederic were first class passengers on the final voyage of the British ocean liner RMS Lusitania when the ship was sunk by a German submarine off the Southern coast of Ireland in May 1915. Together mother and son jumped about 90 feet from the listing boat deck into the ocean, held on to floating debris for several hours and were ultimately rescued.

In 1924 Lassetter returned to Sydney where he died two years later. His widow died the following year. His only son married Nancy Kilgour and had children. He died on 24 February 1940 in Whitchurch, England, at 47 years of age. His family believes that he died young due to the fuel oil he may have ingested while in the water during the sinking of the Lusitania.
