= Henry Colden Antill =

Australian soldier and official (1779-1852)

- Born: 1 May 1779; New York, New York, United States of America
- Died: 14 August 1852 (aged 73); Picton, New South Wales, Australia
- Burial place: Family vault on own property
- Occupations: British Defence Forces Personnel, Magistrate, Police Officer, and Grazier
- Organization: Bank of New South Wales
- Spouse: Eliza Wills
- Children: 6 sons, 3 daughters

Henry Colden Antill (1 May 1779 - 14 August 1852), born in New York was a soldier in the British Army, a settler in Australia, the director of the Bank of New South Wales, and the superintendent of police in his district. He was of English ancestry, because of his great-grandfather Edward Antill who migrated from England to America in 1680.

== Life ==
After John Antill's father's properties were seized due to his involvement in the fight for American independence as a major in the New Jersey Volunteers, he and his family moved to Canada, where Henry Colden spent his youth. He enlisted in the British army in 1796 as an ensign and joined the 73rd Regiment, serving in India and Seringapatam. During this time, he succumbed to a severe shoulder injury. In 1799, he was promoted to a lieutenant and formed a friendship with Captain Lachlan Macquarie.

He and his regiment returned to England on 11 January 1809, where he was promoted to captain. Later that year, Antill and the 73rd regiment sailed to Australia under the command of Macquarie. Antill was appointed aide-de-camp to the Governor General Nightingall, after a recommendation by Macquarie. He was also promoted to the major of the brigade in 1811. The governor, under the companionship of Antill, toured the settled areas and visited Van Diemen's Land in 1811.

He was a close friend and ally of William Redfern, and a firm supporter of the emancipist cause. Antill was also the director of the Bank of New South Wales between 1819 and 1821.

He married Eliza Wills on the 9th October 1818 at St Philip's Church in Sydney. In 1821, he retired from the military, and they settled at Moorebank near Liverpool, and then moved to his estate near Picton in 1825. Antill became a justice of the peace in 1821 and later served as resident magistrate and superintendent of the district police force.

On 14 August 1852, Antill died at Jarvisfield. Wills died on 30 September 1858. Together, they had nine children, six sons and three daughters.
