= Picton, New South Wales =

Picton
- Town
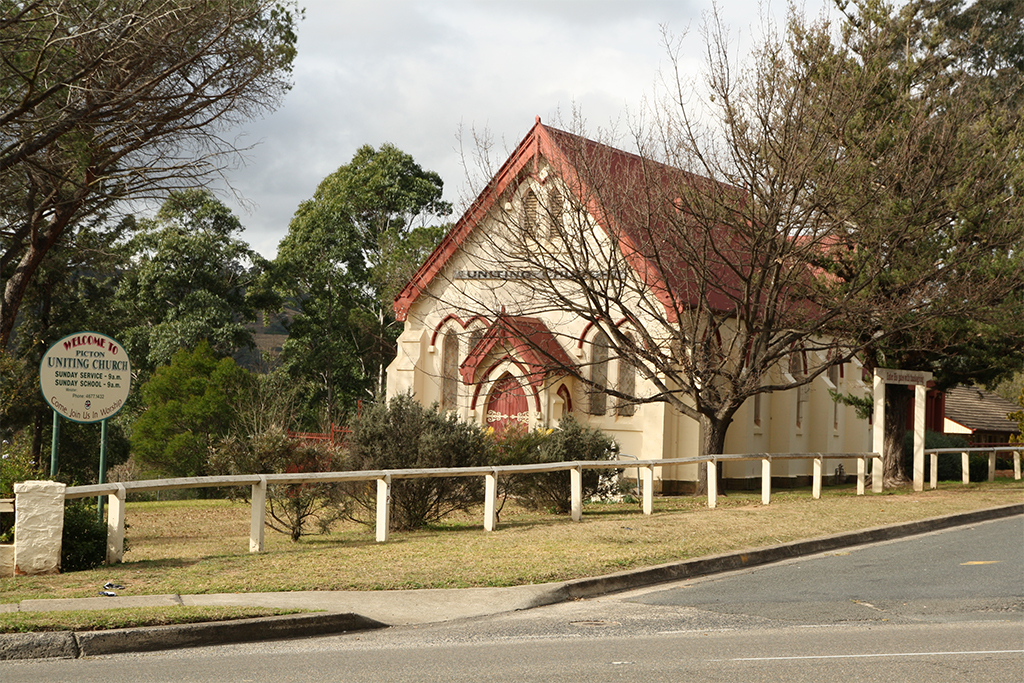
- Picton Uniting Church

- Coordinates: 34°11′S 150°36′E
- Country: Australia
- State: New South Wales
- Region: Macarthur
- City: Sydney
- LGA: Wollondilly Shire
- Location: 81 km (50 mi) from Sydney CBD; 20 km (12 mi) from Camden; 30 km (19 mi) from Campbelltown; 42 km (26 mi) from Mittagong
- Established: 1841

Government
  - State electorate: Wollondilly
  - Federal division: Hume
- Elevation: 165 m (541 ft)

Population
  - Total: 5,282 (SAL 2021)
- Postcode: 2571
- Mean max temp: 23.5 °C (74.3 °F)
- Mean min temp: 8.8 °C (47.8 °F)
- Annual rainfall: 803.6 mm (31.64 in)
Localities around Picton
The Oaks	Razorback	Douglas Park
Mowbray Park	Picton	Menangle
Lakesland	Thirlmere	Maldon

Picton is a small town in the Macarthur region of Greater Sydney in New South Wales, Australia. The town is the administrative centre of the Wollondilly Shire local government area. Picton is located 81 kilometres (50 mi) southwest of the Sydney CBD.

The town is part of the far southwest fringe of Greater Sydney and is located relatively close to other major suburbs, such as Camden and Campbelltown.

== History ==
Picton was first explored by Europeans in 1798 and remained beyond the limits of legal settlement until 1821. Following the discovery of good land in the interior and the settlement of Bong Bong and the Goulburn areas, Governor Macquarie authorised the building of the new Great South Road between Sydney and the Southern Highlands in 1819. This opened up the Picton area to settlers, including Henry Colden Antill, who established a 2,000-acre (810 ha) property in 1822.

Picton developed when a new line of the Great South Road was cut over the Razorback Range from Camden, and especially after the railway arrived in 1863. Picton is the only town in the Southern Hemisphere that one can pass through twice (see Picton railway station) when travelling by train. It was established as Stonequarry in 1841 and was renamed Picton in 1845. It was named for Sir Thomas Picton, a British army officer (described by historian Alessandro Barbero as "respected for his courage and feared for his irascible temperament") who died at the Battle of Waterloo. It remained a stopping point on the Great South Road, later renamed the Hume Highway, until it was bypassed in December 1980.

One house was destroyed by bushfire in the Nangarin Estate located on the western outskirts of Picton, from a fire front originating from Lakesland in September 2006.

== Heritage listings ==
Picton has a number of heritage-listed sites, including:

- Hume Highway Deviation: Jarvisfield
- Main Southern railway: Picton railway station
- Main Southern railway: Stonequarry Creek railway viaduct, Picton
- Oaks Road: Abbotsford
- Prince Street: Victoria Bridge, Picton

== Landmarks ==
Picton is home to many historic buildings, including two types of bridges not found easily anymore elsewhere in the state - Victoria Bridge a timber trestle bridge that crosses Stonequarry Creek, opened in 1897, and the 'Picton Railway Viaduct' a stone viaduct opened in 1863 to also cross Stonequarry Creek.

The viaduct is still in use by the railways. Ghost tours are conducted in some of the historic buildings and inside the disused railway tunnel on Redbank Range, where residents and visitors claim to have experienced paranormal activity. The abandoned tunnel was used to store mustard gas spray tanks during World War II.

The George IV Inn, reputedly constructed in 1839, is considered to be one of the oldest hotel buildings in Australia. The cellar contains remnants of convict shackles as prisoners being transported from Sydney to Berrima prison would often be held in Picton overnight. The barn behind the hotel may date back to 1810 and is possibly the oldest building in Picton - it is used for functions such as birthday and engagement parties. The hotel is also the location of Scharer's Little Brewery, one of the first microbreweries in Australia and winner of numerous awards for its Burragorang Bock and Scharer's Lager beers.

=== Nangarin Estate ===
Nangarin Vineyard Estate or simply Nangarin Estate is a modern village to the west and part of Picton. The estate is one of New South Wales' first residential vineyard projects. The village community manages and maintains the vineyards, residential construction and community facilities. The village is protected by legal covenants to ensure the community manages the village.

== Population ==
According to the 2021 census, there were 5,282 people in Picton.

- Aboriginal and Torres Strait Islander people made up 3.9% of the population.
- 84.4% of people were born in Australia. The next most common countries of birth were England with 4.3%, New Zealand with 1.2%, Scotland with 0.6%, South Africa with 0.5% and Ireland with 0.4%.
- 92.0% of people only spoke English at home.
- The most common responses for religion were No Religion with 35.7%, Catholic with 25.1%, Anglican with 22.0%, and Uniting Church with 2.2%.

Historical population
Year	Pop.	±%
1921	1,044	—
1933	1,037	−0.7%
1947		—
1954	1,234	—
1961	1,314	+6.5%
1966	1,327	+1.0%
1971	1,513	+14.0%
1976	1,715	+13.4%
1981	1,817	+5.9%
1986	1,975	+8.7%
1991	2,116	+7.1%
1996	2,668	+26.1%
2001	2,924	+9.6%
2006	3,027	+3.5%
2011	3,146	+3.9%
2016	3,454	+9.8%
2021	3,847	+11.4%
Source: Australian Bureau of Statistics data.

== Transport ==
Picton railway station is on the Main Southern railway line with a relatively infrequent service with trains running every 30 minutes (peak) – 2 hours (off peak).

The town is located on the Old Hume Highway.

== Sport and recreation ==
Picton also has both senior and junior rugby league and soccer teams. And Picton Netball Club has teams for all age groups. Meanwhile, the Picton Photography Club, called Depictin' Picton, meets every other Saturday to share photos of the local area taken by residents.

The Picton Botanical Gardens were established in 1986.

== Climate ==
Picton has a humid subtropical climate (Cfa) with hot summers and cool to mild winters that are often warm by day. Owing to its inland location in a valley, it has a relatively high diurnal range throughout the year.

Climate data for Picton Council Depot (1907 to 1975 averages, extremes 1965 to 1975, rainfall 1880 to 2020)
Month	Jan	Feb	Mar	Apr	May	Jun	Jul	Aug	Sep	Oct	Nov	Dec	Year
Record high °C (°F)	40.6 (105.1)	42.8 (109.0)	39.4 (102.9)	33.1 (91.6)	27.2 (81.0)	23.8 (74.8)	25.3 (77.5)	26.9 (80.4)	34.4 (93.9)	35.6 (96.1)	38.9 (102.0)	39.6 (103.3)	42.8 (109.0)
Mean daily maximum °C (°F)	29.3 (84.7)	28.6 (83.5)	27.0 (80.6)	23.7 (74.7)	20.2 (68.4)	17.3 (63.1)	16.8 (62.2)	18.2 (64.8)	21.4 (70.5)	24.0 (75.2)	26.3 (79.3)	28.5 (83.3)	23.4 (74.2)
Daily mean °C (°F)	22.3 (72.1)	22.0 (71.6)	20.1 (68.2)	16.5 (61.7)	13.0 (55.4)	10.3 (50.5)	9.3 (48.7)	10.6 (51.1)	13.3 (55.9)	16.4 (61.5)	18.9 (66.0)	21.3 (70.3)	16.2 (61.1)
Mean daily minimum °C (°F)	15.2 (59.4)	15.4 (59.7)	13.1 (55.6)	9.2 (48.6)	5.7 (42.3)	3.2 (37.8)	1.7 (35.1)	2.9 (37.2)	5.2 (41.4)	8.8 (47.8)	11.5 (52.7)	14.0 (57.2)	8.8 (47.9)
Record low °C (°F)	3.3 (37.9)	7.2 (45.0)	1.7 (35.1)	−2.2 (28.0)	−3.3 (26.1)	−4.9 (23.2)	−10.0 (14.0)	−4.4 (24.1)	−2.8 (27.0)	−0.6 (30.9)	2.2 (36.0)	4.7 (40.5)	−10.0 (14.0)
Average precipitation mm (inches)	87.3 (3.44)	91.2 (3.59)	88.2 (3.47)	69.7 (2.74)	57.0 (2.24)	66.3 (2.61)	50.2 (1.98)	43.7 (1.72)	44.4 (1.75)	64.3 (2.53)	72.2 (2.84)	69.8 (2.75)	804.3 (31.66)
Average precipitation days (≥ 0.2 mm)	9.4	9.5	9.6	7.8	7.0	7.5	6.6	6.8	7.2	8.5	8.7	8.6	97.2
Source: Bureau of Meteorology

== See also ==
- Jarvisfield, Picton
