= New South Wales Mounted Rifles =

New South Wales Mounted Infantry (1888–1893) New South Wales Mounted Rifles (1893–1903)
- Active: 1888–1903
- Country: New South Wales
- Allegiance: British Empire
- Type: Mounted infantry
- Engagements: Second Boer War

The New South Wales Mounted Rifles was a mounted infantry regiment of the Colony of New South Wales.

== History ==
The regiment was formed at the Victoria Barracks, Sydney on 17 September 1888, as the New South Wales Mounted Infantry. The regiment was renamed on 1 August 1893, as the New South Wales Mounted Rifles. This retitling was to clearly show that their role was that of mounted rifles not mounted infantry.

A company of the regiment served in the Second Boer War in 1899, before they were amalgamated into the 1st New South Wales Mounted Rifles, as "A" Squadron. This regiment consisted eventually of five squadrons. In 1901, two more regiments of NSW Mounted Rifles, the 2nd and 3rd were sent to the war. The original NSW Mounted Rifles remained in existence for the duration of the war on home service with the additional responsibility for recruiting soldiers for regiments going to South Africa. In 1902 it was responsible for directly recruiting a squadron of 5th Australian Commonwealth Horse.

Following the war, the regiment was retitled as 2nd Light Horse Regiment (New South Wales Mounted Rifles) in 1903, renumbered 9th Light Horse in 1908 and served in this capacity including home service in World War One until the 1920s. After the re-organisation of Australia's part-time military forces at the end of World War 1, the regiment was used to re-raise the 6th Light Horse Regiment. and therefore was entitled to carry the 6th Australian Light Horse battle honours from World War 1 on its guidon.

In 1941 it was mobilized as the 6th Motor Regiment (New South Wales Mounted Rifles) and in 1942 it was retitled the 6th Australian Armoured Car Regiment. It saw only home service before being disbanded in 1943. It was reraised in 1948 as the 6th Motor Regiment (NSW Mounted Rifles) and retitled 1949 as the 6th NSW Mounted Rifles. Reorganised as an Infantry battalion in 1956 it was disbanded and merged into the newly formed Royal New South Regiment in 1960.

== Commanding officers ==
- John Macquarie Antill - 1899-1901
- Lassetter, Harry Beauchamp
