= List of Western Sydney University people =

This is a list of University of Western Sydney people, including alumni and staff.

== Alumni ==
=== Academia ===
- Mireille Astore, artist/lecturer, Sydney College of the Arts (University of Sydney)
- Silma Ihram, political academic
- Nada Kakabadse, professor, University of Northampton
- Christopher Kelen, author, lecturer in creative writing and literature at the University of Macau
- Syed Ziaur Rahman, secretary and chair of the Advisory Council, International Association of Medical Colleges; professor, Jawaharlal Nehru Medical College, Aligarh
- Hollis Taylor, zoomusicologist
- Dinesh Wadiwel, senior lecturer in Human Rights and Socio-Legal Studies at the University of Sydney
- O. K. Harsh, International Academic & Research Advisor of Brit College, BCET, London. Ex Pro-Chancellor (addl), Vice-Chancellor of Glocal University, and Ex Vice-Chancellor of Tantia University

=== Business ===
- Matt Granfield, Head of Marketing, Heritage Bank

=== Politicians ===
==== Federal politicians ====
- Ed Husic, MP, Minister for Industry and Science and member of the Australian House of Representatives representing Chifley

==== State politicians ====
- David Elliott, MP, member of the New South Wales Legislative Assembly representing Baulkham Hills
- Geoff Lee, MP, member of the New South Wales Legislative Assembly representing Parramatta
- Karyn Paluzzano, former member of the New South Wales Legislative Assembly
- Jai Rowell, MP, member of the New South Wales Legislative Assembly representing Wollondilly
- Ron Wells, former member of the Victorian Legislative Assembly and the Victorian Legislative Assembly
- Steve Whan, MLC, member of New South Wales Legislative Council

==== Other politicians ====
- Azis Syamsuddin, Indonesian politician
- Yaw Shin Leong, former Singaporean politician

=== Humanities ===
==== Arts ====
- Craig Anderson, television actor
- Celeste Barber, actor and comedian (Theatre Nepean, 2002)
- Alfio Bonanno, musician
- Jonathan Boulet, musician
- Serhat Caradee (Theatre Nepean), theatre and film director
- Melissa Chiu, museum director, curator and author, Hirshhorn Museum and Sculpture Garden
- Chua Ek Kay, artist
- Dagmar Evelyn Cyrulla, artist
- Timothy Daly, playwright (Theatre Nepean, 1992)
- Nicole da Silva, actress
- Kieran Darcy-Smith, actor and director
- Alexandra Davies, actress
- Anne Deveson, writer
- Joel Edgerton, actor
- Matt Granfield, author
- Joelle Hadjia, musician
- Don Hany, actor
- Anita Heiss, writer
- Steve Le Marquand, actor
- Damian McDonald, author
- Granaz Moussavi, poet and director
- Ben Peek, author
- Ben Quilty, artist, 2011 Archibald Prize winner
- Margaret Roc, author
- Rosie Scott, author
- Yvonne Strahovski, actress
- Travis S. Taylor, science fiction author
- Maria Tran, actress, director
- Jared Turner, actor
- The Umbilical Brothers, David Collins and Shane Dundas, comedy duo
- Tony Walters, director and creator of Double the Fist
- David Wenham, actor (Theatre Nepean, 1987)
- Darren Yap (Theatre Nepean), actor and director

==== Education ====
- Lance Mitchell, educator
- William Wallace, educator

==== History ====
- Matthew Glozier, historian

==== Journalism and media ====
- Whitney Fitzsimmons, television presenter, ABC International
- Paul Murray, radio presenter

=== Sciences ===
==== Medicine ====
- Syed Ziaur Rahman, pharmacologist

=== Military ===
- Garnet Malley, Wing Commander, graduate of the Hawkesbury Agricultural College

=== Sport ===
- Shannon Cole, Western Sydney Wanderers defender (degree on hold)
- Casey Dunning, rugby union player
- Benny Elias, rugby league player with Balmain Tigers
- Morgan Endicott-Davies, Judo
- Frank Puletua, New Zealand rugby league footballer
- Aziz "Zyzz" Shavershian, bodybuilder and internet celebrity
- Francis Vaiotu, NRL player for the Sydney Roosters

=== Other ===
- John Ondawame, activist
- Astrid Perry-Indermaur, activist
- Lancelot Eric Richdale, amateur ornithologist, graduate of the Hawkesbury Agricultural College
- Warwick Watkins, disgraced senior New South Wales public servant and former member of the Australia national rugby union team (the Wallabies)
- Tracey Vivien Steinrucken, Rhodes Scholar, ecologist, molecular biologist

== Administration ==
=== Chancellor ===
Order	Chancellor	Years	Notes
1	Sir Ian Turbott, AO, CMG, CVO	1989–2000	
2	John Phillips, AO	2000–2010	
3	Peter Shergold, AC	2011–2022	
4	Jennifer Westacott, AO	2023–present	

- Gabrielle Harrison, Deputy Chancellor
- Kim Yeadon, Deputy Chancellor

=== Vice-Chancellor ===
Order	Vice-Chancellor	Years	Notes
1	Brian Smith, AO	October 1989–1994	
2	Deryck Schreuder	1994–1998	
3	Janice Reid, AC	1998 – 31 December 2013	
4	Barney Glover, AO	1 January 2014 – 2024	
5	George Williams, AO	22 July 2024 – present	

== Faculty ==
Notable past and current faculty members include:

- Ien Ang, cultural studies, academic and author
- Jack Barbalet, sociologist
- Ragbir Bhathal, astronomer and author
- David Burchell, journalist
- Jane Caro, social commentator and writer
- Roger Dean, musician, biochemist and cognitive scientist
- Jim Falk, physicist
- Jane R. Goodall, author
- Robert Hayes, legal academic
- Bob Hodge, linguist
- Niv Horesh, historian
- Ivor Indyk, literary academic, editor and publisher
- Paul James, writer on globalization, sustainability, and social theory
- Gail Jones, novelist
- Colm Kearney, political economist
- Steve Keen, economist
- Caleb Kelly, curator and author
- Nikolas Kompridis, philosopher and political theorist
- Geoff Lee, former business academic
- Herbert W. Marsh, educational psychologist
- Willard McCarty, digital humanities academic
- Andrew Moore, historian
- Gerald Muench, medical scientist
- Adam Possamai, sociologist
- Juan Francisco Salazar, anthropologist
- Ariel Salleh, philosopher and sociologist
- Brian Sully AM, QC, legal academic
- Bryan Turner, sociologist
