= Macarthur Institute of Higher Education =

Macarthur Institute of Higher Education was an Australian tertiary education institution (College of Advanced Education) from 1974 to 1989. It was known as the Milperra College of Advanced Education until 1983.

== Milperra College of Advanced Education (1974–1983) ==
It was established as the Milperra College of Advanced Education on 15 November 1974. It was a new campus rather than a pre-existing institution, assuming the former site of the Milperra Public School and adjacent market gardens. Construction commenced that year, with the first student intake beginning in second semester 1975; however, with administration occupying the former school building, classes operated out of demountables and other temporary facilities until the purpose-built Building 1 was completed in 1976. The college was formally opened by Premier of New South Wales Neville Wran on 20 March 1978, although it had already been open to students for more than three years. Initially focused on education courses, it soon expanded into liberal arts and social welfare due to changes in demand for places. The school of social work commenced operation in 1976 and the school of liberal and scientific studies in January 1978.

The surrounding suburbs were rapidly developing and largely working-class with low retention in the Higher School Certificate, and even in its final years, more than half of its students were the first member of their family to study at tertiary level, and more than 60 percent from traditionally working-class suburbs of Sydney. It also had a large population of students from non-English-speaking backgrounds, and provided tertiary education that was geographically accessible, with the long commute to the centrally located University of Sydney and University of New South Wales a deterrent for some students in the area.

In 1982, it became the first institution in New South Wales to introduce a support program for indigenous students. The new Aboriginal Education Unit also provided a bridging course for indigenous students, but was assigned facilities at Milperra campus which were so dilapidated students reportedly nicknamed them "the Mission".

== Macarthur Institute of Higher Education (1983–1989) ==
In 1981, the college faced a strong push from a "razor gang" set up by the Fraser federal government to amalgamate with either the Sydney College of Advanced Education or the Nepean College of Advanced Education. It opposed the merger proposal, and was supported in wanting to retain its independence by the state government and its education minister, Ron Mulock. An alternative proposal, whereby it would instead open a second campus at rapidly growing Campbelltown, was accepted by the federal government. As a result, it was renamed the Macarthur Institute of Higher Education from 1 July 1983, and operations in Campbelltown commenced that year. A temporary campus (initially a "Business Studies Centre") opened in the "Maryfields" monastery, which was leased from the Franciscan friars. Construction on a permanent campus, designed by Philip Cox and Associates, commenced in 1984. The new campus was expected to cost at least $16 million; the $9 million first stage, to be completed by 1986, involved a library, lecture rooms, a 300-seat lecture theatre, specialist science, computing and nursing facilities, lecturer offices and a student area with a cafeteria. The second stage, to be completed by 1987, included extra lecture rooms, further specialist and computing facilities, and performing arts facilities.

By 1984, its academic structure contained five schools: Arts and General Studies, Community and Welfare Studies, Education and Language Studies, Nursing and Health Studies, and Business and Technology. In 1985, it began offering a Bachelor of Arts degree, the first of its kind in south-western Sydney. In the same year, it introduced the Associate Diploma in Community Studies (Youth Work) - one of the earlier youth work qualifications in Australia. A School of Nursing opened in February 1985 with 200 students at the Milperra campus, with another 100 students added at Campbelltown in 1986 once additional facilities there were completed. It was the only nursing school in south-western Sydney, and reports noted that it was expected to be one of the biggest in New South Wales once the Campbelltown intake began.

In 1985, the college introduced an alternative entry scheme for undergraduate students from the Fairfield, Liverpool, Bankstown and Campelltown-Camden to assist more people from traditionally underprivileged south-western Sydney into higher education. This allowed students who had not attained the requisite marks in the Higher School Certificate to sit a Regional Entry Test. The college recorded a 35 percent increase in preferences among college and university applicants in 1985, largely for nursing, engineering, science and education courses.

The first students began at the Campbelltown campus in 1986, with about 550 students in the initial intake. Student administration relocated from Milperra in the same year. The new campus offered courses in nursing, business and technology, arts and general studies. It formally opened on 27 November 1987.

A Bachelor of Business (Economics and Finance) degree began in 1987, but faced a setback when the Australian Society of Accountants initially refused accreditation to the course that June, despite it having the approval of the Higher Education Board. By September 1987, the college was reported to have a student population of 3,000, rising to 4,300 in 1989. The college began offering its first master's degree (Education) in 1988.

== Amalgamation ==
In September 1988, amidst a national push for amalgamations in tertiary education, the college was one of four Colleges of Advanced Education targeted by the state Office of Higher Education for a proposed merger with the University of New South Wales. The college council unanimously rejected the proposal, instead pushing for individual university status.

It did not join the initial merger of the Hawkesbury Agricultural College and Nepean College of Advanced Education to form the University of Western Sydney at its commencement on 1 January 1989, but in June 1989 the college council resolved to support joining the university as its third network member. It formally amalgamated with the University of Western Sydney on 1 November 1989. The former campuses of the Macarthur Institute continue to operate as the Bankstown and Campbelltown campuses of the renamed Western Sydney University.
