= Gerald Muench =

Gerald Muench is a senior faculty in the discipline of Pharmacology and has been working as Founder Chair, Pharmacology Department, UWS School of Medicine, University of Western Sydney.

== Biography ==
Gerald Muench (born on 24 March 1961) is an Australian-German medical scientist; who started his career in 1995 from the University of Würzburg, Germany. He was then appointed a teaching post in the Department of Child and Adolescent Psychiatry in 1999. In 2000, he joined the Interdisciplinary Centre for Clinical Research at the University of Leipzig, which he left in 2004 to take up a position as senior lecturer at James Cook University in Townsville. In May 2008, he was appointed as associate professor of pharmacology in the UWS School of Medicine, University of Western Sydney (now Western Sydney University).

He has worked on various projects such as of Western Sydney University, National Health and Medical Research Council, Commonwealth Scientific and Industrial Research Organisation, J.O. & J.R. Wicking Foundation, Alzheimer's Australia, GeroNova Research, Inc, Palo Alto (USA), Alteon Inc., Parsippany (USA), Eurochem Feinchemie, (Munich, Germany).

== Family ==
He belongs to family lineage of Münch

== Awards and recognition ==
- Rene Schubert Prize of the "German Society for Aging Research" (Dt. Gesellschaft für Alternsforschung), 2003
- Best Biomedical Project in the Business Plan Competition of the Bavarian State Government (Landtag of Bavaria) & McKinsey for Northern Bavaria, 1999
- Senior Scientist Visiting Fellowship (Australian Academy of Science / DFG), Host: Prof. Robin Holliday, Division of Biomolecular Engineering, CSIRO; North Ryde, NSW, 1998
- Prize for Brain Research in Gerontology, University of Witten-Herdecke, Germany, 1997
- University Prize of the "Jubilumsstiftung der Universität", University of Würzburg, Germany, 1996
- Stifterverband der dt. Wissenschaft (German Association of Private Foundations) Research Associate Fellowship, 1995
- DFG (German Research Council/Deutsche Forschungsgemeinschaft) Postdoctoral Fellowship (Garvan Institute, Sydney: Host: Professor J. Shine), 1993
- University prize for the best PhD thesis of the faculty, 1991
- J. Lind Award for Most Outstanding Lecturer (University of Western Sydney), 2013

== Scientific contributions ==
- He focuses in researching various aspects of Alzheimer's disease with a special emphasis on carbonyl stress in age-related and neurodegenerative processes, and also looking at brain inflammation as a major progression factor in Alzheimer's disease, now widely accepted.
- He puts on view the role of Advanced glycation end product in Alzheimer's Disease, which is now widely accepted fact.
- He is also looking to discover and identify novel anti-inflammatory and neuroprotective compounds from marine macroorganisms and tropical rainforest plants, a project started through James Cook University's "Enhancing life in the tropics".

=== Affiliations ===
He has served on the editorial boards of many international scientific journals and has been a consultant with Aventis, Roche Diagnostics, Merz, ASTA Medica/Degussa and Geronova. At present, he is a member of editorial board for the Journal of Neural Transmission.

== See also ==
- Advanced glycation end product
- Syed Ziaur Rahman (PhD student)
