= Tracey Vivien Steinrucken =

Australian plant ecologist

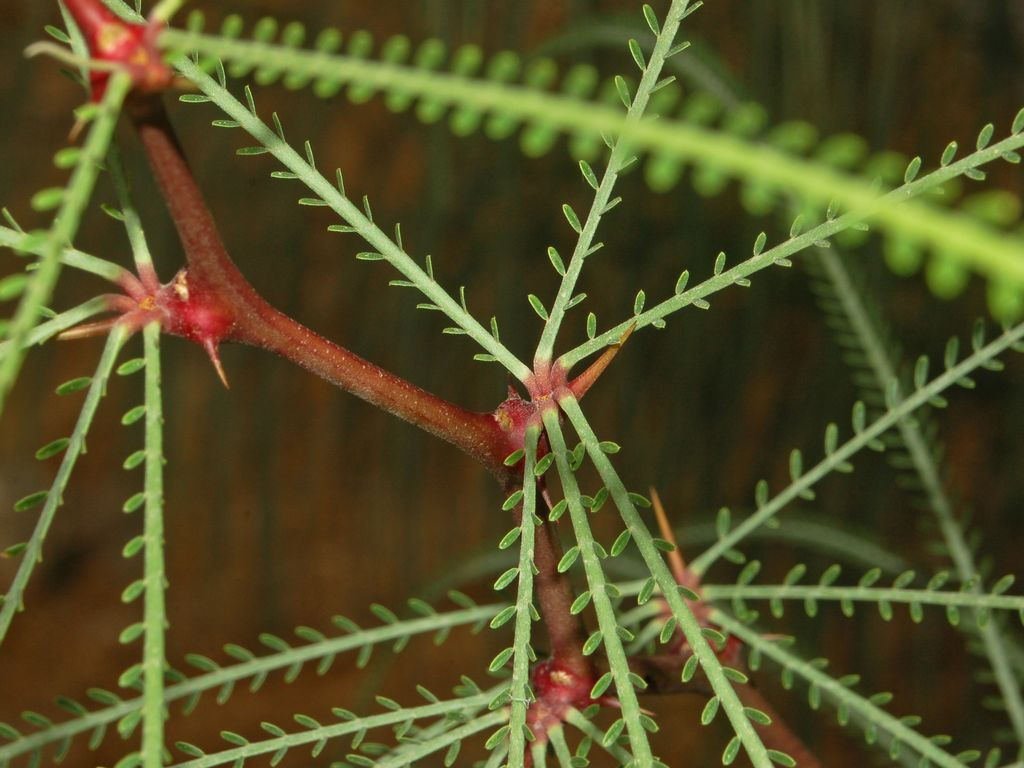
Thorns on the invasive weed Parkinsonia aculeata, which can grow from 2 to 8 meters high.

Tracey Vivien Steinrucken is an Australian plant ecologist who specializes in invasive plant species. She is a Fulbright Scholar and combines the study of the pathology of these plants with molecular biology, specifically looking for methods to use fungal controls against the invasive woody weed, Parkinsonia, which spreads unchecked over large areas of Australia, and many other parts of the world.

== Biography ==
Steinrucken is sister to Olympic diver Grant Nel and grew up in South Africa before migrating to Australia. After enrolling at Deakin University in Melbourne, she earned her Bachelor of Commerce and Bachelor of Science degrees in 2010. In Sweden, at Lund University, she finished her Master’s in Science in 2011. At the Royal Melbourne Institute of Technology, she completed an Honors program in Applied Science, which was made possible with a scholarship from the Victoria Department of Environment and Primary Industries. In 2017, she finished her PhD studies at the Hawkesbury Institute for the Environment at Western Sydney University. She was named a Fulbright Scholar in 2015, which allowed her to spend nine months at the Forest Pathology and Mycology Lab at University of California, Berkeley. As of 2025, she is employed in Australia at the Commonwealth Scientific and Industrial Research Organisation (CSIRO) as a research scientist.

=== Research ===
When she asked advisors about potential PhD projects that concerned plant pathology and biological control, she was steered to Parkinsonia aculeata, sometimes known as Jerusalem thorn, an invasive species that looks like a spiny shrub or small tree, that it can be found across Western Australia, the Northern Territory and Queensland. The thorny trees form dense thickets and can harm natural biodiversity by crowding out native plants and denying humans and animals access to water resources and pastures. It spreads via seasonal floods and can be found growing along waterways in dense monocultures.

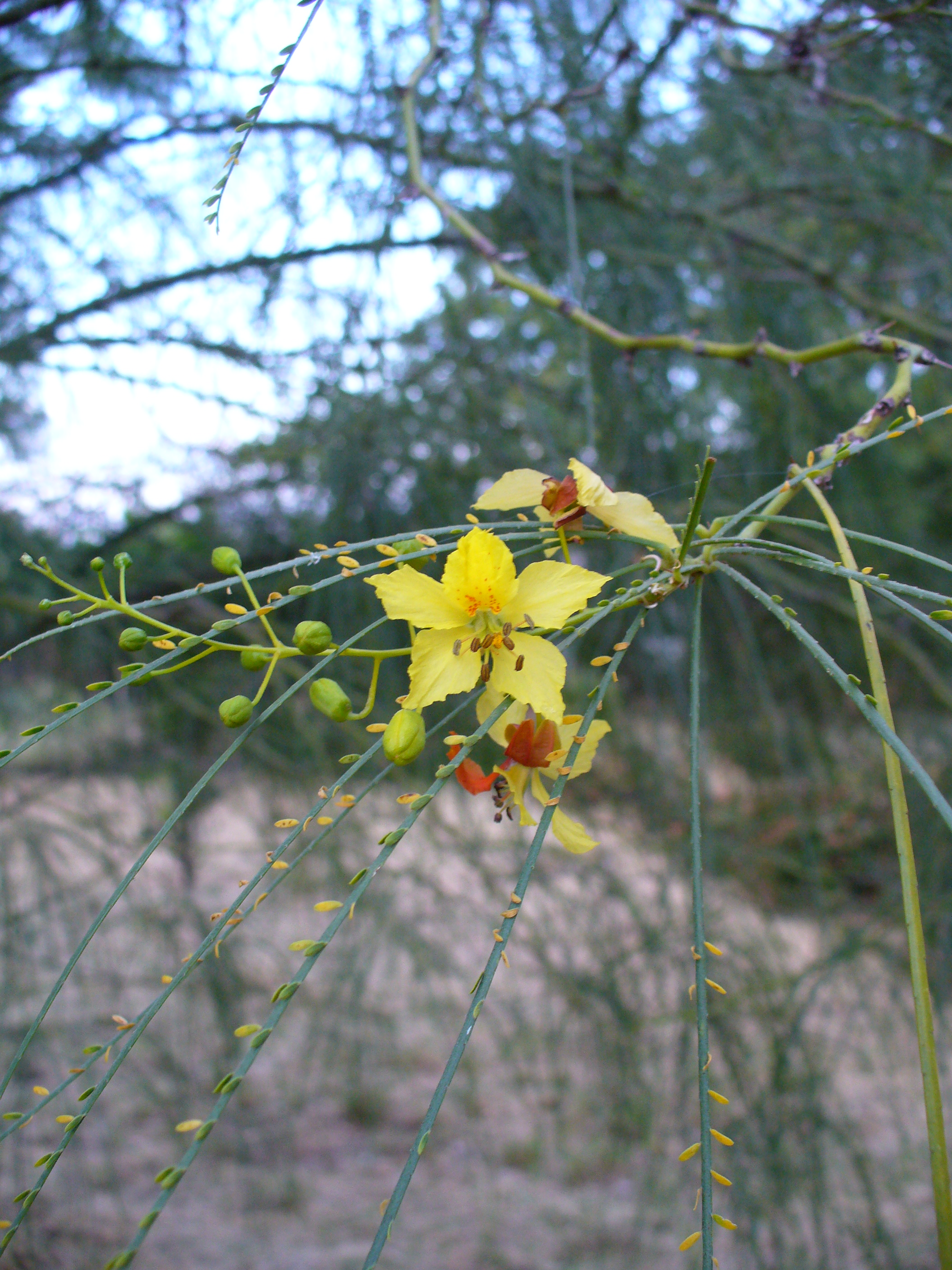
Parkinsonia is considered the worst of Australia's invasive weeds.

The plant is native to Central America but was introduced to Australia around 1900 as an ornamental hedge with bright yellow flowers. It is now considered the worst of Australia's Weeds of National Significance.

Farmers and scientists have observed a naturally occurring inhibition process called "dieback," which effectively reduce the populations of Parkinsonia in the wild. Steinrucken set out to study the dieback phenomenon and evaluate it as a potential biocontrol agent.

Through her own field studies, combined with molecular and microbial techniques, she is learning about one cause of Parkinsonia dieback. She found a significant difference between the microbial communities in dieback-affected Parkinsonia compared to healthy plants in the same area and has proposed a potential biological tool that may allow the use of a fungus to control the invasive weed.

== Selected works ==
- Steinrucken TV, Bissett A, Powell JR, Raghavendra AKH, van Klinken RD, (2016) 'Endophyte community composition is associated with dieback occurrence in an invasive tree', Plant and Soil, vol.405, no.s 1-2, pp 311–323
- Steinrucken TV, Aghighi S, Hardy GES, Bissett A, Powell JR, van Klinken RD, (2017) 'First report of oomycetes associated with the invasive tree Parkinsonia aculeata (Family: Fabaceae)', Australasian Plant Pathology, vol.46, no.4, pp 313–321
- Steinrucken TV, Raghavendra AKH, Powell JR, Bissett A, Van Klinken RD, (2017) 'Triggering dieback in an invasive plant: endophyte diversity and pathogenicity', Australasian Plant Pathology, vol.46, no.2, pp 157–170

== Distinctions ==
- Fulbright Scholar, 2015

== See also ==
- Invasive species in Australia
- Weeds of National Significance
- Environmental issues in Australia
