= College of Advanced Education =

Class of Australian tertiary education institution

The College of Advanced Education (CAE) was a class of Australian tertiary education institution that existed from 1967 until the early 1990s. They ranked below universities, but above Colleges of Technical and Further Education (TAFE) which offer trade qualification. CAEs were designed to provide formal post-secondary qualifications of a more vocational nature than those available from universities, chiefly in such areas as teaching, nursing, accountancy, fine art and information technology.

CAEs were intended to greatly expand the capacity of Australian higher education and produce more graduates needed as Australia's economy was becoming more complex and diversified in the post World War 2 era. Stronger demand for places resulted from a broadening appeal of higher education beyond the traditionally elite education provided by the universities.

== Description ==
Colleges of Advanced Education were similar in ideals and physical facilities to Australian universities of the period, but were state owned and controlled instead of federally funded and independent. CAEs offered shorter courses, such as certificates and diplomas, and were initially excluded from awarding degrees, which were the purview of the universities. Through the mid-1980s onwards, many CAEs offered bachelor degree courses. Additionally, their staff, who were not required to undertake research, were generally on lower pay scales than their university counterparts.

CAEs were designed to complement universities, forming a binary system modelled on that of the United Kingdom. This system was created by the Menzies government on the advice of the Committee on the Future of Tertiary Education in Australia, chaired by Sir Leslie H. Martin, who was Chairman of the Australian Universities Commission from 1959 to 1966.

While the initial intention was for CAEs not to issue degrees, in the first year of the sector's establishment, the Victorian College of Pharmacy was permitted to issue a degree by the Victorian government, and its Commonwealth funding was not cut off for breaking the rules. Many other degree courses followed, and the policy was reviewed.

Until 1974, the sector mainly comprised technical, agricultural and specialist paramedical colleges. In that year, the state government controlled teacher colleges became CAEs, leading to teaching students comprising half of all students in the sector.

The colleges were known by a number of different titles:

- "Colleges of Advanced Education" were generally former Teachers Colleges that slowly diversified their course offerings after their name (and often concurrent structural) changes. These changes happened at a time when there were more teachers being trained than the local market could support.
- "Institutes of Technology" were oriented toward vocational education, and offered a range of courses up to higher education level.
- Other names, often with the title "College" or "Institute" of Higher or Advanced Education, were also used.

This sector ceased to exist when, between 1989 and 1992, the Hawke-Keating government implemented the sweeping reforms of Education Minister John Dawkins. The states, eager for increased education funding, merged CAEs either with existing universities or with each other to form new universities. The AVCC produced a report in 2004 comprehensively setting out results of the various amalgamations and integrations.

== Former Colleges of Advanced Education ==
- Adelaide CAE (merged into the University of Adelaide in 1991, which then became Adelaide University)
- Armidale CAE (from 1994 part of The University of New England)
- Bendigo CAE (from 1991, part of La Trobe University)
- Brisbane CAE (in 1990, divided between Griffith University and Queensland University of Technology (QUT))
- Canberra CAE (from 1990, the University of Canberra)
- Cumberland College of Health Sciences (now a faculty within the University of Sydney)
- Gold Coast CAE (from 1990, part of Griffith University)
- Goulburn CAE (1975 – 1 January 1982, formerly Goulburn Teachers College from 1970 to 1975, was a campus of Riverina CAE in 1982 and 1983, then became the location of the New South Wales Police Force Academy in 1984)
- Hawkesbury Agricultural CAE (from 1989 part of University of Western Sydney)
- Kuring-gai CAE (from 1990, part of the University of Technology, Sydney (UTS))
- Lincoln Institute of Health Sciences (from 1988 part of La Trobe University)
- Magill CAE (merged with other CAEs and the South Australian Institute of Technology to become the University of South Australia.)
- Melbourne CAE (from 1989, part of the University of Melbourne)
- Mitchell CAE (from 1989, Charles Sturt University)
- Nepean CAE (from 1989, the University of Western Sydney)
- Newcastle CAE (renamed in 1988 to Hunter Institute of Higher Education and from 1989 part of University of Newcastle)
- Northern Rivers CAE (from 1989–93, the University of New England - Northern Rivers and from 1994 Southern Cross University)
- New South Wales College of Para-medical Studies (from 1975, Cumberland College of Health Sciences)
- Prahran CAE (from 1981, Victoria College and in 1992 divided between Deakin University, Swinburne University of Technology and the Victorian College of the Arts)
- Riverina CAE (established 1972 on the site of the Wagga Wagga Teachers College, which was founded in 1947; from 1985, it was Riverina–Murray Institute of Higher Education and from 1989 part of Charles Sturt University
- Salisbury CAE (finishing in 1991, and later sold off to become a private school campus, also having some land allocated to a state school in this land carve up.)
- South Australian CAE (spread across multiple campuses but in 1991, divided between the University of Adelaide, Flinders University and the University of South Australia)
- Sturt CAE (in 1991, sold off to Flinders University.)
- Sydney CAE (in 1990, divided between the University of Sydney, Macquarie University, University of New South Wales and the University of Technology, Sydney (UTS))
- Tasmanian CAE (now part of University of Tasmania (UTAS))
- Townsville CAE (from 1 Jan 1982, part of James Cook University of North Queensland; renamed James Cook University (JCU) on 1 Jan 1988)
- Underdale CAE (also known as Torrens CAE, partly sold off as part of a land redevelopment, but also merged with other CAEs to become the University of South Australia
- Western Australian CAE (from 1991, Edith Cowan University)

== Former Institutes of Technology ==
- Chisholm Institute of Technology (from 1990 part of Monash University)
- Darwin Institute of Technology (from 1989 Northern Territory University, now Charles Darwin University)
- Footscray Institute of Technology (from 1990 Victoria University of Technology, now Victoria University)
- New South Wales Institute of Technology (from 1989 the University of Technology, Sydney (UTS))
- Phillip Institute of Technology (from 1992 part of Royal Melbourne Institute of Technology (RMIT))
- Queensland Institute of Technology (from 1989 Queensland University of Technology (QUT))
- Royal Melbourne Institute of Technology, now RMIT University
- South Australian Institute of Technology (from 1991 the University of South Australia)
- Swinburne Institute of Technology (from 1992 Swinburne University of Technology)
- Tasmanian State Institute of Technology (from 1991 part of the University of Tasmania)
- Western Australia Institute of Technology (from 1987 Curtin University of Technology)

In each state, the most prestigious university created from an Institute of Technology became a founding member of the Australian Technology Network.

== Former Institutes of Advanced/Higher/Tertiary Education ==
- Darling Downs Institute of Advanced Education (from 1990-92 University College of Southern Queensland and from 1992 University of Southern Queensland)
- Gippsland Institute of Advance Education (from 1990 part of Monash University)
- Hunter Institute of Higher Education (from 1989 part of University of Newcastle)
- Macarthur Institute of Higher Education (from 1989 University of Western Sydney)
- Riverina-Murray Institute of Higher Education (from 1989 Charles Sturt University)
- Warrnambool Institute of Advanced Education (from 1990 part of Deakin University)
- Wodonga Institute of Tertiary Education (from 1994 part of La Trobe University)

== See also ==
- Category:Universities in Australia
- Institute of technology
- Technical and Further Education
