= Cristina Rocha =

Australian anthropologist of religion

Cristina Rocha FAHA
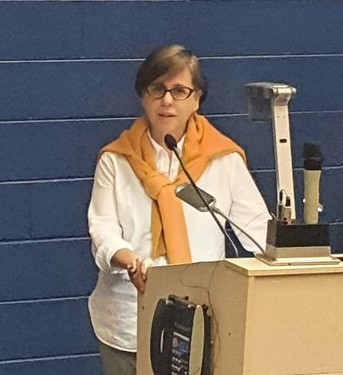
- Occupation: Anthropologist

Cristina Rocha FAHA is a Brazilian-Australian Professor of anthropology at Western Sydney University. She works at the intersection between globalisation, migration and religion. She has written on Buddhism, New Age spirituality and most recently on pentecostalism.

== Education ==
In 1986, Rocha graduated from the University of São Paulo with a Bachelor of Social Sciences.

In 1996, she graduated from the same institution with a Masters in Anthropology. Her Masters thesis focused on the ways in which migrants practiced tea ceremony as a way to perform their ethnic identity in Brazil. For this work she conducted fieldwork in Japan in 1992–3, funded by a fellowship from the Urasenke Foundation.

Rocha began her PhD studies at the Department of Anthropology at the University of São Paulo, but on moving to Australia she was awarded a scholarship at the Centre of Cultural Research (now known Institute for Culture and Society) at Western Sydney University.

During her candidature, she conducted fieldwork in Japan supported by a Japan Foundation Doctoral Fellowship. In 2004 she received her PhD from the Centre of Cultural Research at Western Sydney University. Her thesis analysed the inception of Zen Buddhism in Brazil and argued that Brazilian intellectual elites adopted Zen driven by a desire to acquire and accumulate cultural capital both locally and overseas.

It was published as a book titled Zen in Brazil by Hawaii University Press in 2006.

== Career ==
In 2006, Rocha received an ARC Postdoctoral Fellowship based at the Institute for Culture and Society. Her project on the transnational religious field between Brazil and Australia resulted in the book John of God: The Globalization of Brazilian Faith Healing published by Oxford University Press in 2017. For this work Rocha placed third in the Geertz Prize for the Society for the Anthropology of Religion for her book John of God.

In 2008, Rocha taught for a short period at Macquarie University, before being appointed as on a permanent basis at Western Sydney University, where she is currently a staff member.

Rocha has held research fellow positions in several world-class universities. In 2011, Rocha was a visiting research fellow at the Max Planck Institute for Religious and Ethnic Diversity. She has also held research fellow positions at the University of Utrecht, Netherlands (2019), Kings College (2017) and Queen Mary College (2012), UK, CUNY Graduate Centre, USA (2012). More recently, she was awarded a senior fellowship at the Paris Institute for Advanced Study.

In 2014 Rocha was awarded an ARC Future Fellowship to research trans-national flows of Pentecostalism between Australia and Brazil. In particular, the project focussed on the Australian megachurches Hillsong and C3 have expanded to Brazil. She is presently writing a book drawing on this research.

Between 2018 and 2019, Rocha was the president of the Australian Association for the Study of Religion. With Martin Baumann, Jovan Maud and Ann Glieg, she is co-editor for the Journal of Global Buddhism. Rocha is also one of the editors for the Religion in the Americas book series.

Rocha is the author of 2 monographs, 3 edited books and over 60 articles and book chapters. her publications have been translated into Japanese, Spanish French and Portuguese and are used for teaching in universities across the world.

Rocha writes occasional pieces for The Conversation connected to her research. She wrote an entry titled "Brazilians" for the Dictionary of Sydney. She has also written for Religious Matters, a blog edited by Professor Birgit Meyer at Utrecht University and Sapiens, an online anthropology magazine published in partnership with the University of Chicago Press.

As an expert on Brazil and religion, she frequently gives interviews to the media. Notably, she was recently asked to comment on a television segment deemed by the federal court to be both "inaccurate and racist."

== Honours ==
- Elected Fellow of the Australian Academy of the Humanities (2023).
- Senior fellow at the Paris Institute for Advanced Study (2021–2022).
- President of the Australian Association for the Study of Religion (2018–2019).
- 3rd Place in Geertz Prize awarded to her book John of God (OUP) by the Society for the Anthropology of Religion at the American Anthropological Association (2019).
- ARC Postdoctoral Fellowship, Future Fellowship and Discovery grants.
- Japan Foundation and Urasenke Foundation Fellowships

== Books ==
- Rocha, C., M. Hutchinson, K. Openshaw, eds. (2020) Australian Pentecostal and Charismatic Movements: Arguments from the Margins. Leiden: Brill
- Rocha, C. (2017) John of God: The Globalization of Brazilian Faith Healing. New York: Oxford University Press
- Rocha, C. (2016) O Zen no Brasil: Em Busca da Modernidade Cosmopolita. Campinas: Editora Pontes.
- Rocha, C. & M. Vásquez (2016) A Diáspora das Religiões Brasileiras. São Paulo: Ideias e Letras.
- Rocha, C. and Manuel Vasquez (2013), The Diaspora of Brazilian Religions, Leiden: Brill.
- Rocha, C. and M. Barker (2010), Buddhism in Australia: Traditions in Change, London: Routledge Critical Studies in Buddhism series.
- Rocha, C. (2006), Zen in Brazil: The Quest for Cosmopolitan Modernity, Honolulu: University of Hawaii Press.
