= Matthew Glozier =

Australian historian

Matthew Robert Glozier (born 1972) is an Australian-based historian and history teacher.

== Early life and education ==
Glozier was born in Sydney, Australia, in 1972. He attended the University of Sydney and obtained a BA (Hons) degree (1990–93) and an MPhil in History (1997). He was awarded a Commonwealth Research Scholarship to complete a PhD at the University of Western Sydney, entitled Scottish Soldiers in France and The Netherlands, 1660–1692 (conferred 2002).

== Academic career ==
Glozier has written works on expatriate soldier groups of French Huguenot and Scottish extraction. As Official Historian of the Australian Air Force Cadets he is currently preparing for publication a history of Australian Air Force cadets, 1941-2016, for the 75th anniversary diamond jubilee of the AAFC. He is also slowly compiling a volume of biographical reference relating to French refugee soldiers serving in armies across Europe circa 1685–1713. The project grew out of his earlier prosopographical research into the Huguenot military support lent to William of Orange during the Glorious Revolution of 1688. This is the subject of his monograph, published by Sussex Academic Press in 2002. A second book, Scottish Soldiers in France in the Reign of the Sun King: Nursery for Men of Honour History of Warfare: 24 (Brill Academic Publishers), based on his doctoral thesis, appeared in 2004.

He has written and revised nine articles for the Oxford Dictionary of National Biography and his most recent biography is the first scholarly long study of Friedrich Hermann von Schomberg to be written in English based on new research: Marshal Schomberg, 1615–1690: ‘the ablest soldier of his age’: International soldiering and the formation of state armies in seventeenth–century Europe (Sussex Academic Press, 2005). The book has been called an "accessible study" that should "do much to rescue its subject's life and career from undeserved neglect".

Glozier’s most recent work is a book on Huguenot soldiers in armies across Europe, co-edited with Dr David Onnekink (Utrecht University) – War, religion and service: Huguenot soldiering, 1685–1713 (Ashgate Academic Publishers, 2007). A foreword to the book was contributed by Peter de la Billière who claimed ‘it is the first study of its kind to treat consistently the military contribution made by the Huguenots to armies outside France at the high point of their historical importance as a historical group.’. The collection deals with areas of Huguenot studies often neglected by Anglophone research.

Glozier is widely published as a military historian, interested in military, social and religious aspects; he analyses migration streams and the social and religious stratification of soldier refugee groups, in volumes that appeal to academic and to interested general readers and whose international scope is useful for those seeking to explore the nexus of British and European military and political history. He explores the rise of nationalism, the transition from contract-based military service to the reliance on standing forces, and religion as a chief motivation for many soldiers.

Matthew is a co–founder of the Huguenot Society of Australia (begun in 2002) and a Fellow of the Huguenot Society of Great Britain and Ireland. He was made a Fellow of the Royal Historical Society in 2009. He was appointed Official Historian of the Australian Air Force Cadets organization in 2013. Matthew is an Honorary Associate of the Medieval and Early Modern Studies Centre (University of Sydney), President of the Sydney Society for Scottish History, and a History Master at Sydney Grammar School.

== Personal life ==
Matthew is married to Francesca and they have two children, Max and Charlotte. He coaches and writes about fencing, a sport he has enjoyed since he was at school. He is currently researching Classical Fencing. He is a volunteer Officer of Cadets in the Australian Air Force Cadets and an enthusiastic owner of German Shorthaired Pointer dogs.

== Publications ==
=== Books ===
- Sydney Grammar School and the South African War, 1899-1902. Raleigh, NC: M. R. Glozier, Pending. Pp. xvi, 286. ISBN, 978-1-326-53370-0
- 75 Years Aloft: Australian Air Force Cadets (Royal Australian Air Force Air Training Corps), 1941-2016. Canberra: Defence Printing Service, 2016. Pp. xx, 428. ISBN 978-1-326-14299-5
- Marshal Schomberg, 1615–1690: the ablest soldier of his age: international soldiering and the formation of state armies in seventeenth–century Europe. Brighton, Portland: Sussex Academic Press, 2005. Pp. xiv, 249. ISBN 1-903900-60-3
- Scottish soldiers in France in the reign of the Sun King: nursery for men of honour. History of Warfare Series: 24. Leiden, Boston, Köln: E. J. Brill, 2004. Pp. xvi, 290. ISBN 90-04-13865-X
- The Huguenot soldiers of William of Orange and the Glorious Revolution of 1688: the lions of Judah. Brighton, Portland: Sussex Academic Press, 2002. Pp. xi, 240. ISBN 1-902210-82-4
- with David Onnekink (eds), War, religion and service: Huguenot soldiering, 1685–1713. Politics and Culture in North-West Europe 1650-1720. Aldershot: Ashgate Academic Publishers, 2007. Pp. xvi, 316. ISBN 0-7546-5444-3
