= Nepean College of Advanced Education =

Former Australian higher education institution

Nepean College of Advanced Education was an Australian higher education institution (College of Advanced Education) from 1973 to 1989.

It was formed on 5 November 1973 by the amalgamation of the Westmead Teachers' College, which had opened in 1969, and the under-construction Kingswood College of Advanced Education, which had only been incorporated that March. It had two campuses: one at Kingswood and one at Westmead, the latter divided into two sites 500 metres apart. It initially operated from the Westmead campus while construction continued on the Kingswood campus, which eventually opened in February 1977. It expanded beyond its original teaching offerings, introducing a School of Business in 1976, and offering its first degree qualification, a Bachelor of Business, in 1977; a diploma of visual and performing arts was also introduced by 1980. A co-operative program in applied science, conducted in partnership with the New South Wales Institute of Technology, was established in the 1980s.

By 1984, it had four divisions: the School of Business, School of Teacher Education, School of the Arts and Centre for Applied Science, and a student population of about 2,100, rising to 2,900 in 1986. A School of Nursing opened in 1984. The college acquired the former St Vincent's Boys' Home at Westmead in 1985; thereafter the previous Westmead campus became "Westmead South" and the new buildings "Westmead North". In 1986, the college purchased additional land at Westmead from the Marist Brothers, after which it sold the original ("Westmead South") campus, which was now in a deteriorating state, to the Department of Education. In the years prior to its amalgamation, it faced conflict over various merger proposals and problems caused by rapidly rising demand in Western Sydney for its courses met with inadequate funding. A shortage of campus space had forced it to lease commercial premises to accommodate 100 visual arts students. By its final year, 1988, it was being threatened with losing its Australian Society of Accountants accreditation due to severe staff shortages.

In 1985, Premier Neville Wran initiated a Higher Education Board inquiry into higher education in Western Sydney, headed by Ron Parry. The report recommended the amalgamation of the Nepean College of Advanced Education and the Hawkesbury Agricultural College to form a new university. The state government gave effect to the report's recommendations in the University of Western Sydney Act 1988, and the college formally amalgamated into the new University of Western Sydney from 1 January 1989. It thereafter became the university's Nepean campus in UWS' federal structure.
