= Barney Glover =

Australian academic and politician (born 1958)

Professor Barney Glover AO, FTSE, FRSN
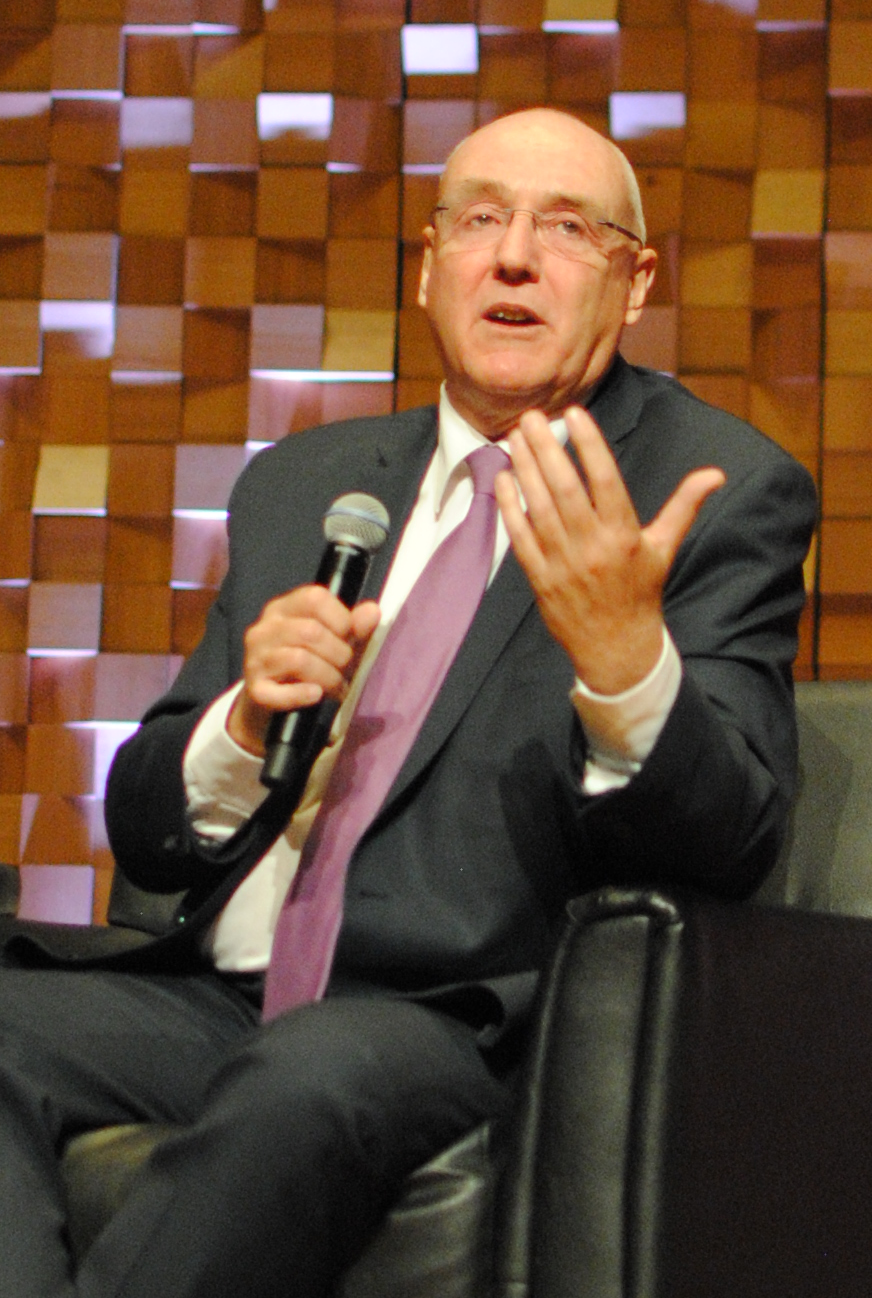
- Glover in 2018
- Born: Bevil Milton Glover; 5 September 1958 (age 68); Geelong, Victoria, Australia
- Education: Newcomb Secondary College; University of Melbourne
- Occupation: Academic
- Employer: Australian Government
- Organization(s): Jobs and Skills Australia
- Awards: Officer of the Order of Australia; Fellow of the Royal Society of New South Wales
- Website: www.westernsydney.edu.au/chancellery/barney_glover

Professor Bevil Milton "Barney" Glover AO FTSE FRSN was previously the Vice-Chancellor and President of Western Sydney University. He is currently the Commissioner of Jobs and Skills Australia.

== Personal life ==
Glover was educated at Newcomb High School, Victoria, Australia. He later studied mathematics at the University of Melbourne, receiving a PhD in 1993.

== Career ==
Glover began his executive career at the University of Ballarat, where he was appointed the Director, Research and Graduate Studies in 1990. In 1997 he moved to Curtin University as the Director, Research and Development, before being appointed Pro-Vice Chancellor Research and Development. In 2006 Professor Glover became the Deputy Vice-Chancellor of Research at the University of Newcastle.

In 2009, Glover became the Vice-Chancellor of Charles Darwin University. He began his term as Vice-Chancellor of Western Sydney University in January 2014.

In 2015, Glover was elected unopposed as the Chair of Universities Australia, the peak body representing the Australian university sector nationally and internationally.

Glover is the Australian Government representative on the University of the South Pacific University Grants Committee.

Glover is a board member of the Museum of Applied Arts and Science Trust, and Education Services Australia.

Glover was the Chair of Innovative Research Universities. He is currently the Chair of Rare Voices Australia, a not-for profit organisation established to advocate for Australians living with a rare disease.

In 2016, Glover was nominated for the Bent Spoon award. An unsuccessful attempt was made by a colleague to remove this nomination.

Elected a Fellow of the Royal Society of New South Wales in 2017 and gazetted as such in the NSW Government Gazette by the then governor David Hurley in February 2018.

In December 2024, he was appointed as a Trustee of the Museum of Applied Arts and Sciences.
