= Western Sydney University School of Medicine =

Coordinates: 34.069754°S 150.793412°E

- Type: Public
- Established: 2007
- Dean: Rod McClure
- Location: Campbelltown, New South Wales, Australia
- Campus: Urban & Rural
- Affiliations: Western Sydney University
- Website: https://www.westernsydney.edu.au/medicine

The Western Sydney University School of Medicine is a constituent body of the College of Health and Science at Western Sydney University, Australia.

On average, it accepts 120-150 students for admission each year starting in January. Domestic students seeking entry into the school are required to sit the University Clinical Aptitude Test (UCAT ANZ) and to meet the required threshold for each section. Following this, prospective students who receive the required UCAT score are invited to a Multi-Mini-Station Interview, and assessed against various academic thresholds.

It became the third medical school offering degrees for medical practice in Sydney after The University of Sydney and The University of New South Wales. In 2007, the Bachelor of Medicine/Bachelor of Surgery (MBBS) degree was offered for the first time and in 2019, the Doctor of Medicine (MD) program was introduced to replace it.

== Affiliated Hospitals ==
Clinical teaching of the School of Medicine is imparted at following medical hospitals:

- Campbelltown Hospital
  - Macarthur Clinical School
- Blacktown Hospital
  - Blacktown/Mt Druitt Clinical School
- Bathurst Base Hospital
  - Bathurst Clinical School
- Lismore Base Hospital
  - Lismore Clinical School
- Liverpool Hospital
- Bankstown-Lidcombe Hospital
- Fairfield Hospital

== Program ==
The School of Medicine offers a 5 year Bachelor of Clinical Science / Doctor of Medicine degree that allows students to seek registration as a doctor in New South Wales.

Students undertake 2 years of pre-clinical study at the Campbelltown Campus before being allocated to one of the clinical schools at Campbelltown, Blacktown, Bathurst or Lismore for 3 years of clinical rotations and research. During their degree, students are exposed to a variety of learning styles including small group tutorials, problem based learning, lectures, clinical tutorials as well as clinical placements.

== Student Life ==
There are various student organisations at the School of Medicine representing various specialties and interests.

=== Western Sydney Medical Society (WSMS) ===
The Western Sydney Medical Society is the peak representative body for all medical students studying at Western Sydney University, and is officially affiliated with the School of Medicine. It supports students in matters of advocacy, and also runs various social and academic events throughout the year at WSU. It is led by the WSMS Executive, which are elected on an annual basis, and supported by various representatives from different cohorts, clinical schools, advocacy groups, amongst others.

WSMS also hosts various Special Interest Groups for students who are particularly interested in a specialty. These include Physicians, Surgery, Critical Care, Obstetrics & Gynaecology, Global Health Awareness and more.
