= Jerusalem thorn =

Jerusalem thorn is a common name for several plants and may refer to:

- Paliurus spina-christi, a shrub native to the Eastern Hemisphere
- Parkinsonia aculeata, a shrub native to the Western Hemisphere
