= Western Sydney University =

University in Sydney, Australia

Coordinates: 33.6092°S 150.7540°E

- Former name: University of Western Sydney (1989–2015)
- Motto: Unlimited
- Type: Public research university
- Established: 1 January 1989; 37 years ago
- Accreditation: TEQSA
- Academic affiliations: Utrecht Network (AEN); Innovative Research Universities (IRU)
- Budget: A$1.12 billion (2023)
- Visitor: Governor of New South Wales (ex officio)
- Chancellor: Jennifer Westacott
- Vice-Chancellor: George Williams
- Total staff: 3,278 (2023)
- Students: 47,197 (2023)
- Undergraduates: 36,279 (2023)
- Postgraduates: 7,067 coursework (2023); 1,366 research (2023)
- Other students: 2,485 (2023)
- Location: Greater Western Sydney, New South Wales, Australia
- Campus: Metropolitan multi-campus
Colours
Crimson, white and black
- Sporting affiliations: UniSport; EAEN
- Mascot: Doug the Duck
- Website: westernsydney.edu.au

Western Sydney University, formerly the University of Western Sydney, is an Australian multi-campus public research university in the Greater Western region of Sydney, New South Wales, Australia.

The university in its current form was founded in 1989 as a federated network university with an amalgamation between the Nepean College of Advanced Education and the Hawkesbury Agricultural College. The Macarthur Institute of Higher Education was incorporated in the university in 1989. In 2001, the University of Western Sydney was restructured as a single multi-campus university rather than as a federation. In 2015, the university underwent a rebranding which resulted in a change in name from the University of Western Sydney to Western Sydney University. It is a provider of undergraduate, postgraduate, and higher research degrees with campuses in Bankstown, Blacktown, Campbelltown, Hawkesbury, Liverpool, Parramatta, Penrith, and Surabaya.

== History ==
=== Foundation and early years (1988–1990s) ===
The university consists of an amalgamation of campuses, each with their own unique and individual history. In 1891, the Hawkesbury campus was established as an agricultural college by the NSW Agricultural Society. At Parramatta, Western Sydney University owns and has renovated the Female Orphan School building, the foundation stone of which was laid by Governor Lachlan Macquarie in 1813.

In 1987, the New South Wales Labor government planned to name the university Chifley University, after the former Labor prime minister, Ben Chifley. However, in 1989, a new Liberal government reversed this decision and controversially named it the University of Western Sydney.

In 1989, teachers' colleges and Colleges of Advanced Education in Sydney's western suburbs were given university status under the University of Western Sydney Act 1988. The 1990s saw the federation of three education providers: UWS Nepean, UWS Hawkesbury, and UWS Macarthur. The university has a legislative basis in NSW state legislation with the passing of the University of Western Sydney Act 1997, which also empowers the university to make by-laws affecting the operation of the university.

A performing arts school had been established at UWS's predecessor, the Nepean College of Advanced Education, in 1980. There was a School of Visual and Performing Arts in the 1990s at UWS Nepean at Kingswood. The early incarnation of the school comprised three specialisations, acting, dance, and theatremaking. The drama school at UWS became known as Theatre Nepean. In 1997, a student-led organisation, CentreStage, was created by second-year performance students as a fund-raising body to cover the costs of staging and promoting Theatre Nepean's graduation productions not only at the Playhouse at the Kingswood campus and the Centre for Contemporary Performance at the Werrington South campus. Ruth Cracknell was its founding patron (and patron of Theatre Nepean until her death in 2002), with John Bell patron, and 1987 graduate of Theatre Nepean, David Wenham, its ambassador in 2002. At some point, due to lack of funding, the school amalgamated its three-discipline program into a single course.

=== Restructuring (2000s) ===
Previous logo of the University of Western Sydney

Federal government funding of Australia's universities as a percentage of Australia's GDP was in decline during the years of the Howard government. Federal funding policy was very influential at UWS. In 2000, after internal restructuring and cost-cutting, UWS Hawkesbury, UWS Macarthur, and UWS Nepean ceased to exist as autonomous components of the now defunct University of Western Sydney federation and became the new multi-campus University of Western Sydney.

In the 2000s, UWS consolidated its schools of fine art, social science, humanities, and psychology. In this decade the university introduced its first nanotechnology and biotechnology undergraduate degrees.

In 2003, UWS sponsored a Samuel Beckett symposium as part of the Sydney Festival. In 2004, UWS joined with Metro Screen and SLICE TV to successfully bid for Sydney's first permanent community television licence. Television Sydney, broadcasting as TVS, launched in February 2006 from a broadcast operations centre located on the Werrington South Campus. In 2006, the UWS news site reported: "Demand to study at the University of Western Sydney is on the rise, with UWS receiving the third-biggest jump in first preferences among NSW and ACT universities for 2007".

In 2007, Theatre Nepean was suspended indefinitely, and the Australian Academy of Dramatic Art (AADA; now Australian Institute of Music - Dramatic Arts, or AIMDA) began a similar training program the following year, aiming at producing graduates who are all-round theatre-makers. Also in 2007, UWS had its first intake for Bachelor of Medicine / Bachelor of Surgery degree courses. In the same year, UWS was part of a consortium with Griffith University and the University of Melbourne to win funding for a National Centre of Excellence for Islamic Studies.

In 2008, UWS announced new water and energy saving strategies, its Indigenous Advisory Board (announced on in August 2008) and endorsed prime minister Kevin Rudd's Apology to Australia's Indigenous peoples.

In 2011 and 2012, Professors Roy Tasker and James Arvanitakis respectively, were announced as the Prime Minister's Australian University Teacher of the Year.

=== Renaming (2015) ===
On 30 August 2015, the University of Western Sydney underwent a rebranding which resulted in a change in name to Western Sydney University. Many students criticised the re-branding, calling it a waste of money that stripped the university community of its established identity.

== Campuses and buildings ==
Western Sydney University is a multi-campus institution. Each campus hosts an array of courses and different units can be completed across multiple campuses.

=== Parramatta ===
The Parramatta Campus was first established on the site of the Female Orphan School, which was founded in 1813. The site was formerly home to Rydalmere Psychiatric hospital and is located at the eastern end of Parramatta, near the border with the suburb of Rydalmere. It now houses the Whitlam Institute.

The Rydalmere campus was established as a campus of UWS in 1998. It is the nearest campus to the Sydney CBD.

Parramatta campus courses include occupation fields like Science, Business, and Law. It also hosts their Science courses in modern buildings near to the Rydalmere campus at a site formerly used by quarantine authorities, CSIRO, Amdel Sugar, and the Biological and Chemical Research Institute laboratories.

The university announced the establishment of a new campus in the Parramatta CBD as an extension of its existing Parramatta Campus in 2014.

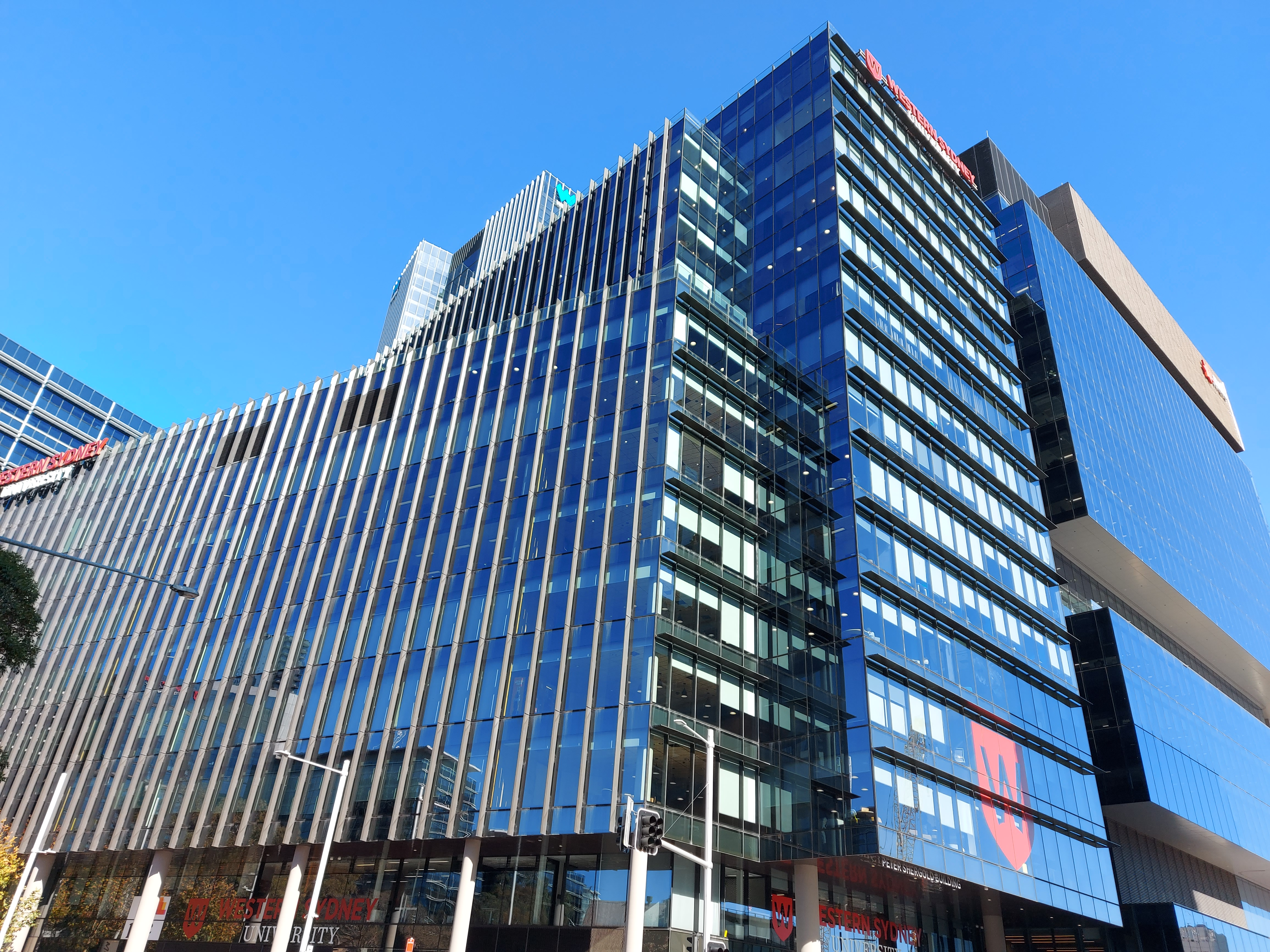
Parramatta City campus

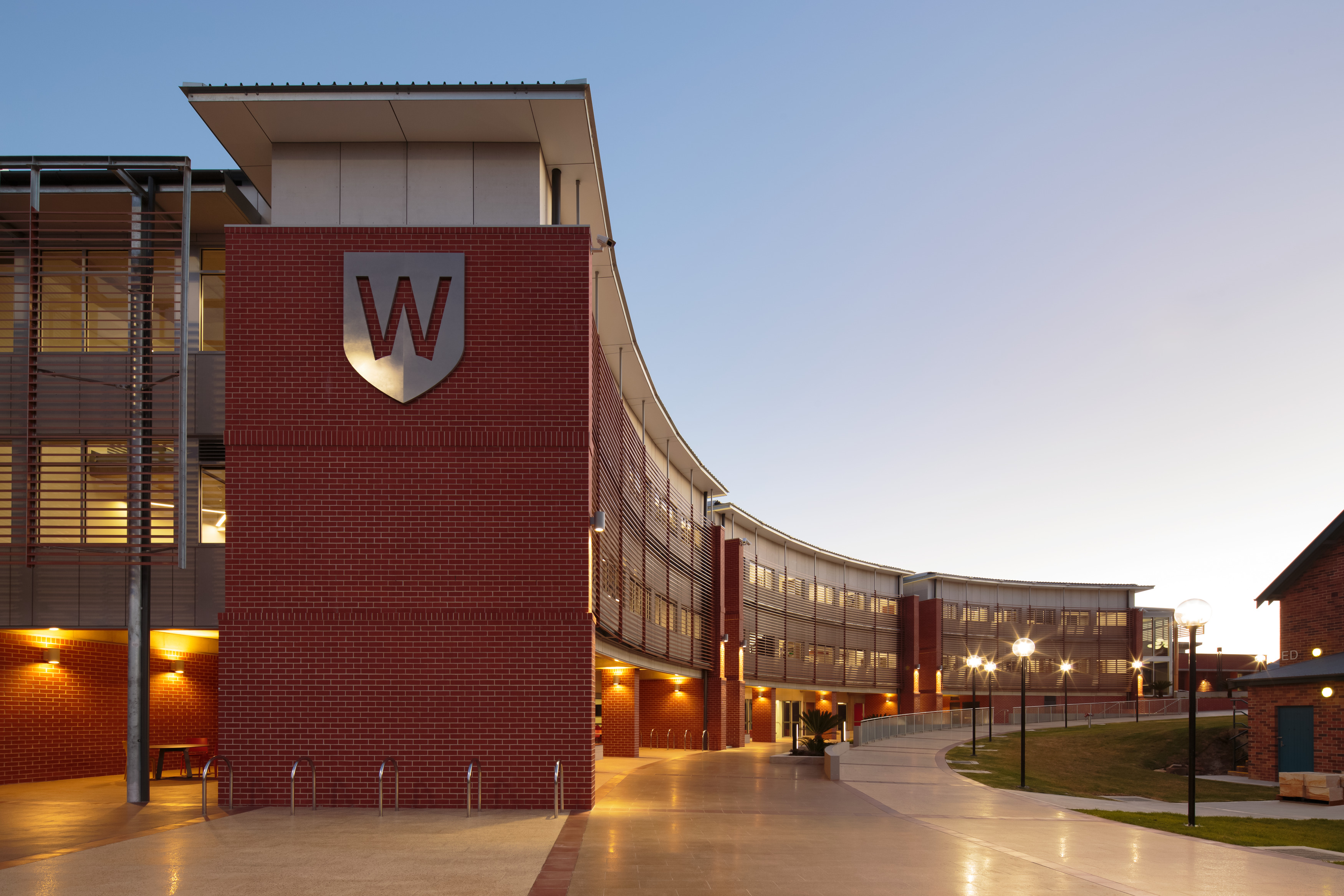
Science Building, Parramatta South campus

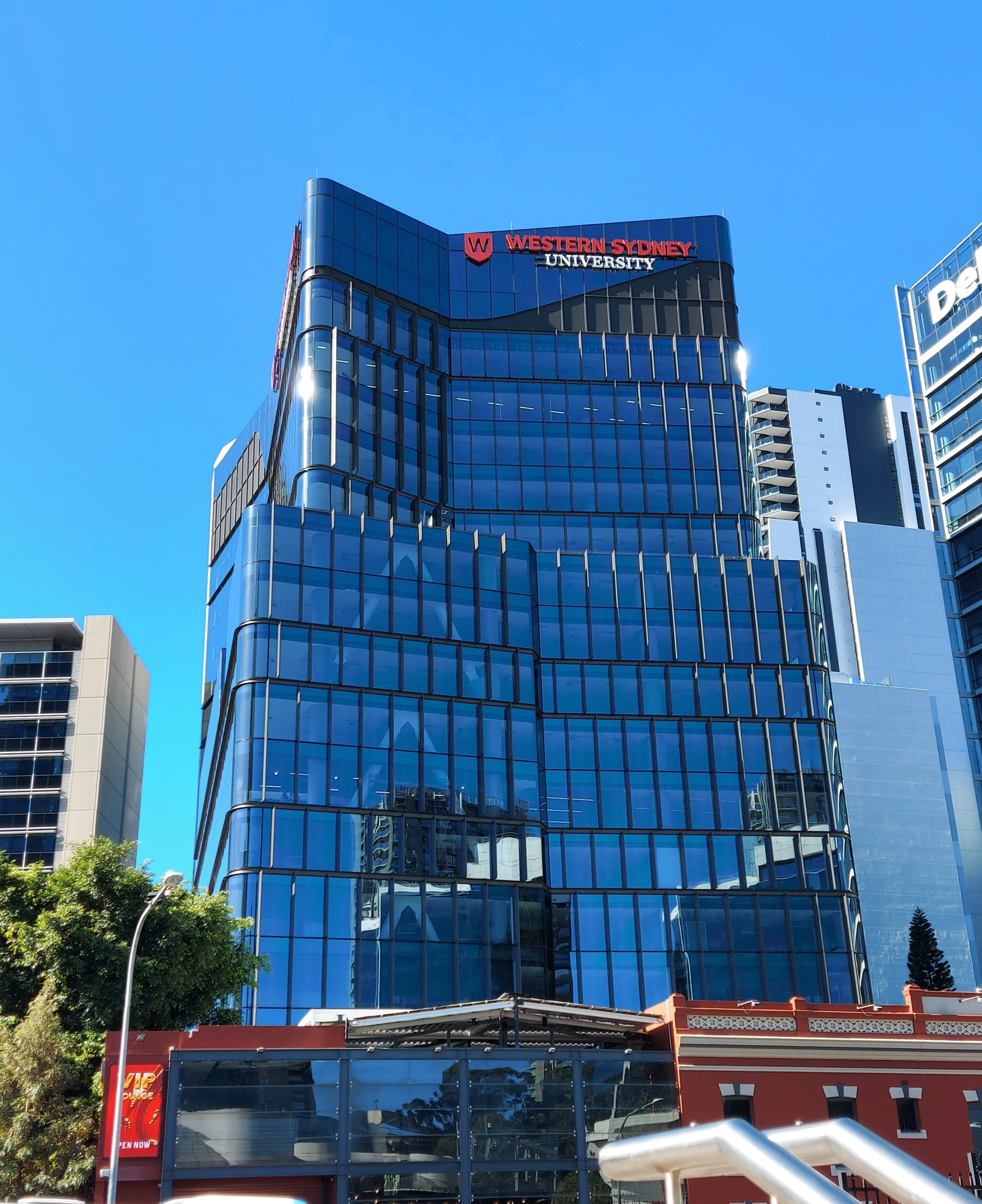
Engineering Innovation Hub, Parramatta City campus

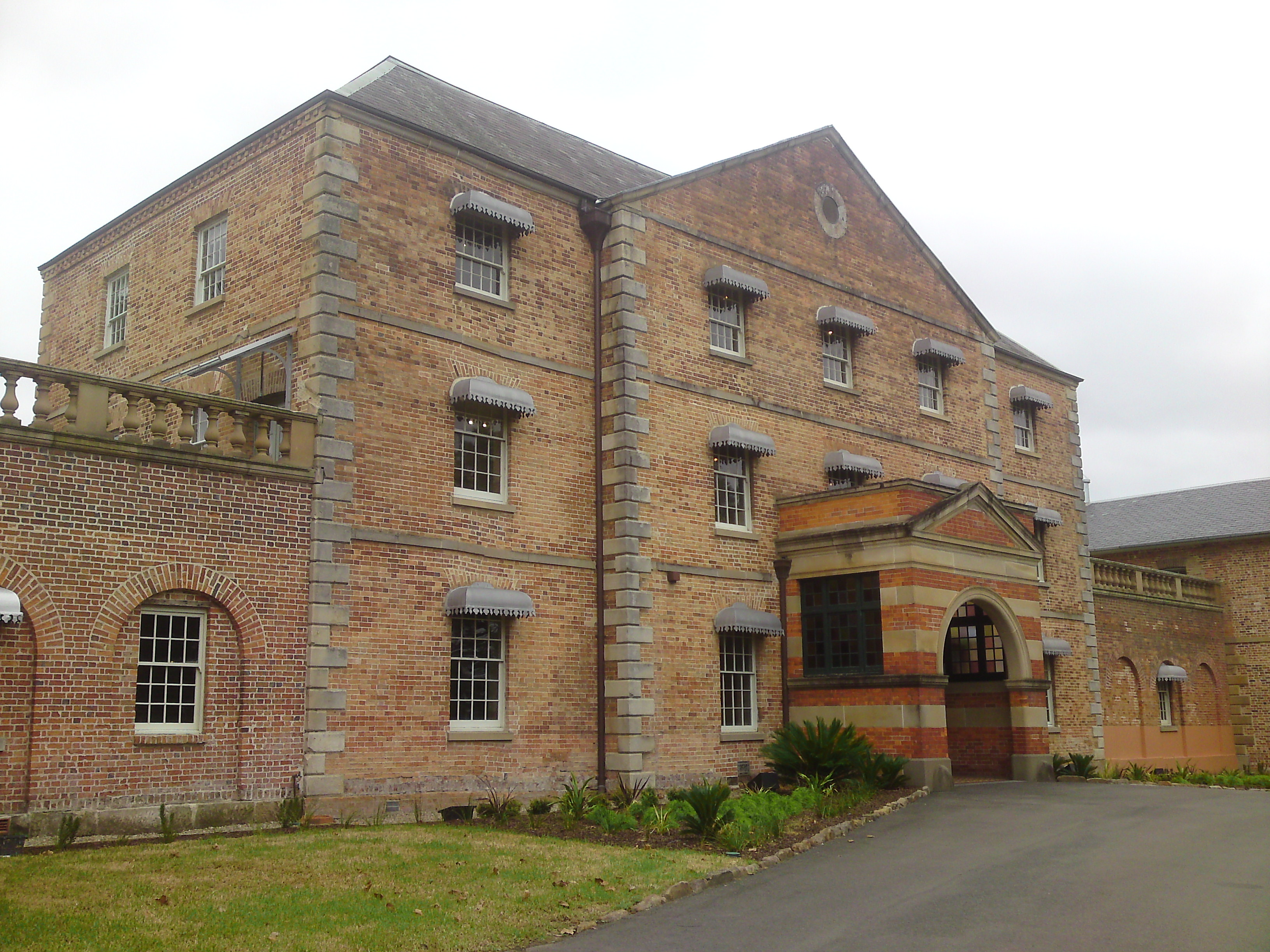
The former Female Orphan School, now located on the present day site of the Parramatta South Campus

=== Bankstown ===
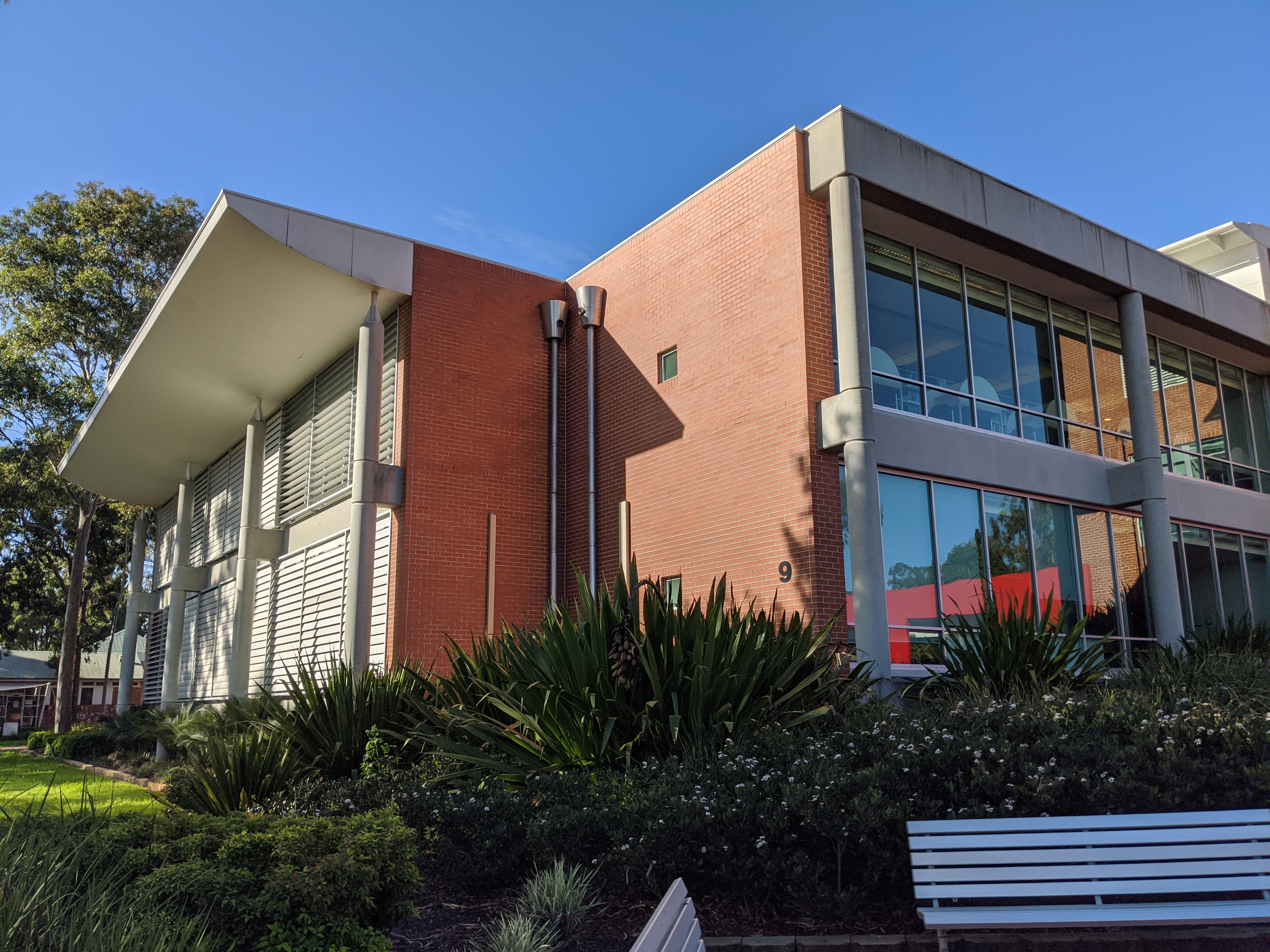
The former Bankstown Campus Library at Milperra

The Bankstown Campus which opened in 1989, was located at Milperra, about 5 kilometres (3.1 mi) from the Bankstown CBD. Specialising in the social sciences, most of the students on campus are psychology, sociology, arts, linguistics, and education students. The campus also hosts the Bachelor of Policing degree and much of The MARCS Institute. UWS's most well-known interpreting and translation course is taught at Bankstown campus. UWS trains and produces many NAATI accredited interpreters and translators. The campus also included a modern cafeteria/eatery area as well as Oliver Brown.

It was the original campus of the Macarthur Institute of Higher Education, which merged into the then-new university in 1989; however, as a result of widespread rebuilding by WSU, the oldest building on campus was opened in 1989. The building contains a plaque indicating that it was opened by the then treasurer and later Prime Minister Paul Keating.

Western Sydney University has built a new vertical campus in the Bankstown CBD which opened in March 2023. The campus caters to 10,000 students and 700 staff with courses in education, psychology, business and IT. In December 2019, Western Sydney University announced a partnership with the University of Technology Sydney which will see the two universities collaborate on postgraduate teaching and research. The two universities will also co-locate their business incubator programs at the new Bankstown City Campus. The new Bankstown City campus was officially opened in December 2022, and commenced teaching in early 2023.

=== Blacktown ===
In 2009, Western Sydney University opened The College at the old Blacktown campus of the university after protest about the divesting of property and resources from the site.

The university's Nirimba campus is built on the site of HMAS Nirimba, a former naval aviation base, and is also known as the Nirimba Education Precinct, located in Nirimba Fields, about a 10-minute drive from Blacktown. The nearest railway station is Quakers Hill station in the neighbouring suburb of Quakers Hill. The campus has many historical buildings and two crossed air runways that ceased operation 1994. The Nirimba campus has student accommodation, air-conditioned lecture theatres and rooms built in the 1990s. The campus has views of the now closed Schofields Aerodrome. Campus numbers have dwindled since the university reduced the range of courses available. The campus is primarily a single-discipline campus, offering business courses which are also taught at other Western Sydney University campuses. Nirimba campus is not far from Norwest Business Park.

Located in the Nirimba Education Precinct in Nirimba Fields, the campus is the home of the Western Sydney University-owned UWSCollege. Western Sydney University shares the precinct with TAFE NSW-Western Sydney Institute, Nirimba College, St John Paul II Catholic College and Wyndham College.

In recent times there has been much controversy over the status of this campus, at one point Western Sydney University was depicted in the media as abandoning the campus and the local area it served. There was even a council run protest at the closure called Save UWS Nirimba, where politicians and the university were petitioned to save the campus from closure, later it was decided rather than divesting they would set up The College. Western Sydney University has recently announced for its Blacktown campus a brand new Medical facility called the Blacktown-Mount Druitt Clinical school which would be based at Blacktown Hospital, making it the second clinical school associated with the School of Medicine; the first school being the Macarthur Clinical School at Campbelltown Hospital which opened in March 2007. In 2017 the university announced plans to sell off land held on the Nirimba site, previously set aside for student accommodation.

The library located in C21 was originally a dual purpose library, though run and staffed by Western Sydney University it was also used as the TAFE library. In 2023, TAFE NSW established its own separate library service in a nearby building, serving TAFE students, TAFE alumni and community borrowers.

The University library also caters to the students of The College.

=== Campbelltown ===
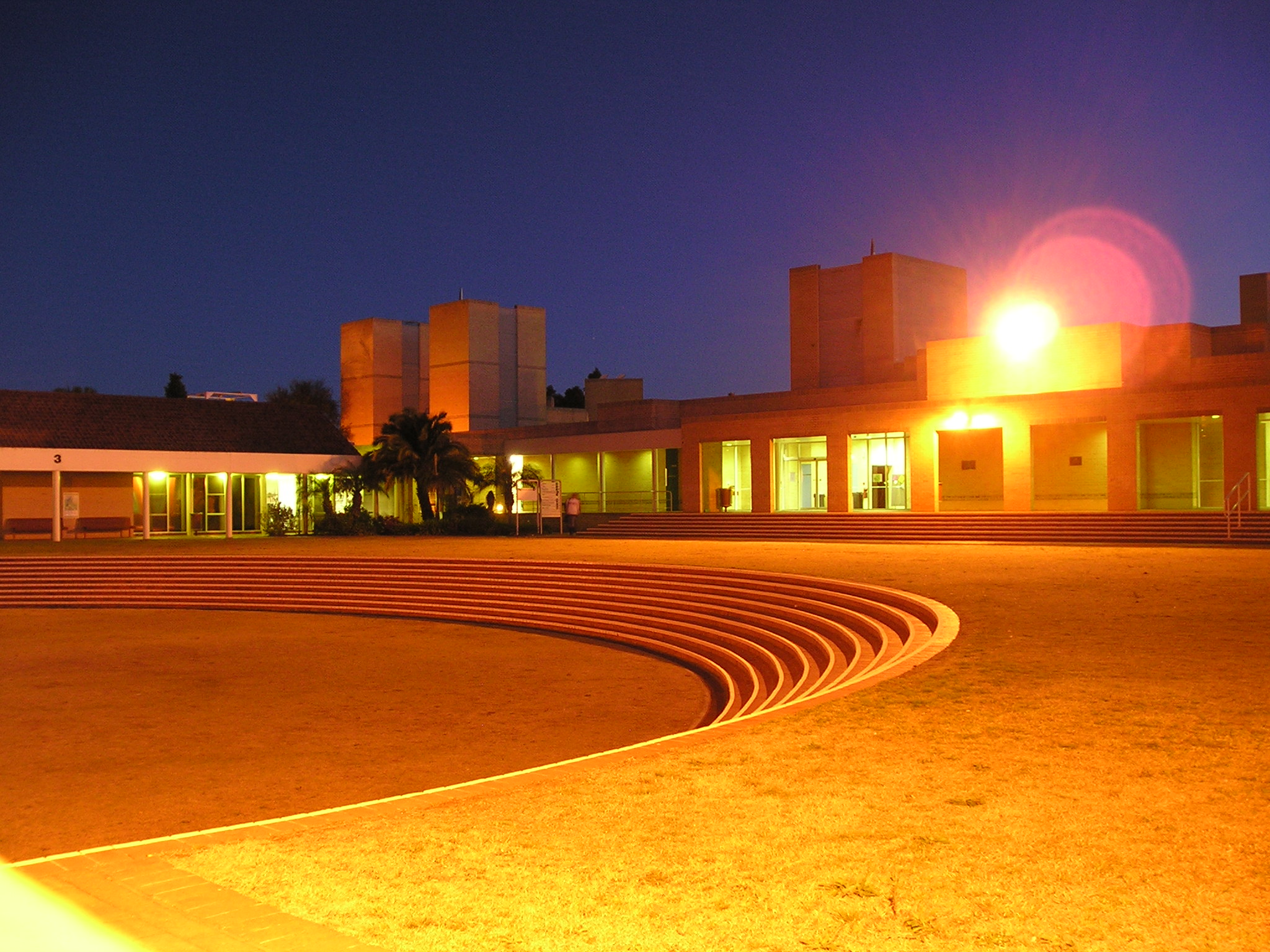
WSU (Campbelltown Campus) at night – 2006

The Campbelltown Campus is located in the semi-rural Macarthur region in South Western Sydney. Together with the Bankstown campus, the Campbelltown campus was originally part of the Macarthur Institute of Higher Education, founded in 1984. The campus offers degrees (among many others) in medicine, health, sciences, nursing, law and business. Research centres are also located in the campus.

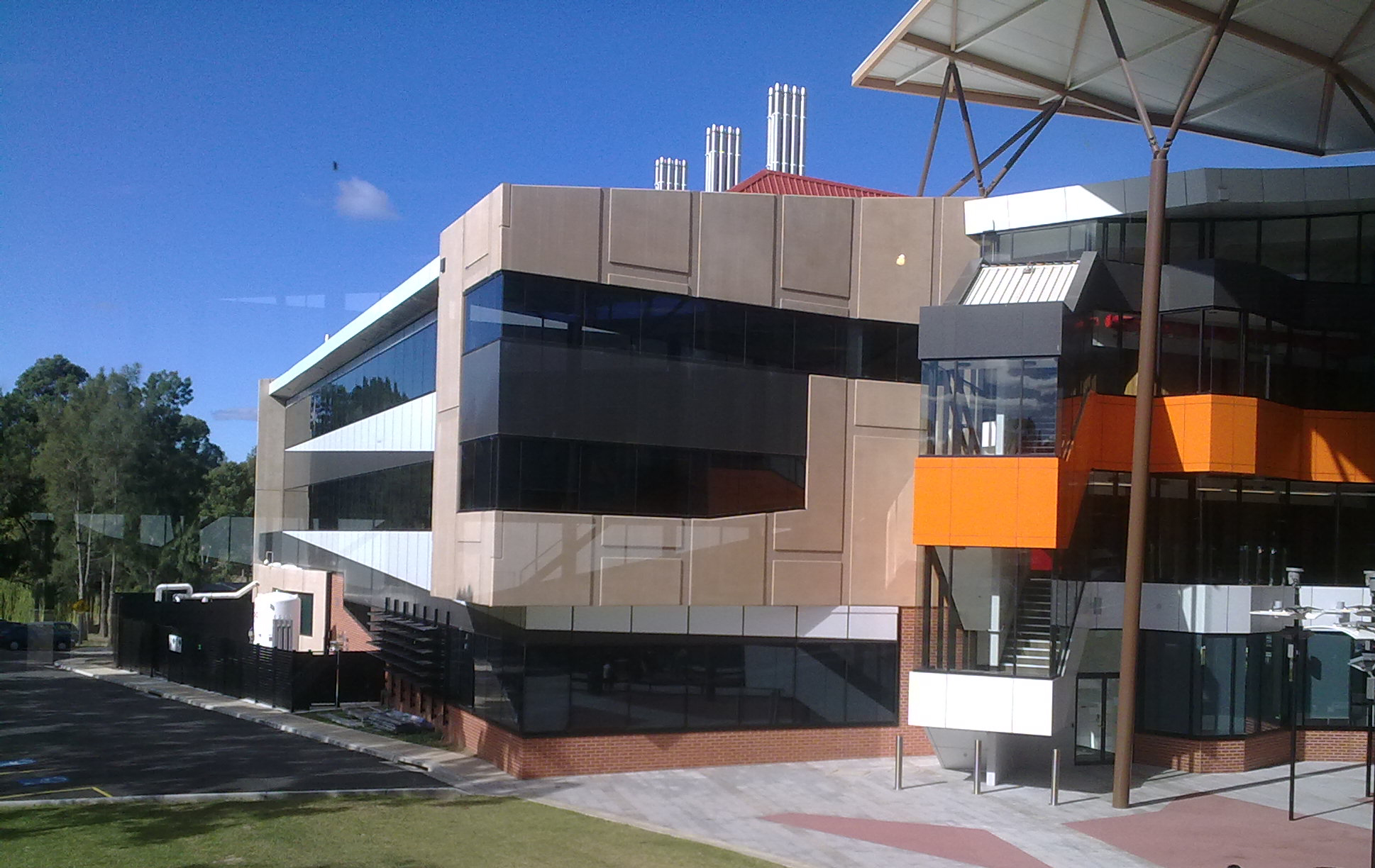
School of Medicine

In 2007, the School of Medicine was established and began offering the Bachelor of Medicine/Bachelor of Surgery (MBBS) degree for the first time in the university's history. It is hoped that many of the School's graduates will practice in the Western Sydney region, in order to redress the shortage of healthcare professionals in the area.

The on-campus student accommodation (called 'Gunydji') was upgraded in 2010 with a maximum occupancy of 205. It is a complex of self-contained units that accommodate one to five tenants each.

The campus is home to the UWS Rotary Observatory, designed by Dr. Ragbir Bhathal, consisting of two observing domes of 4.5m and 2.9m diameter respectively, opened on 15 July 2000. The observatory is principally utilised for Optical S.E.T.I. research but also hosts community astronomy nights, in collaboration with Macarthur Astronomical Society. In 2013 the observatory was relocated to make way for a new residential housing estate to the south of the campus. It was reopened in a new location on 2 October 2014. The campus also provides the venue for the Macarthur Astronomy Forum.

=== Hawkesbury ===
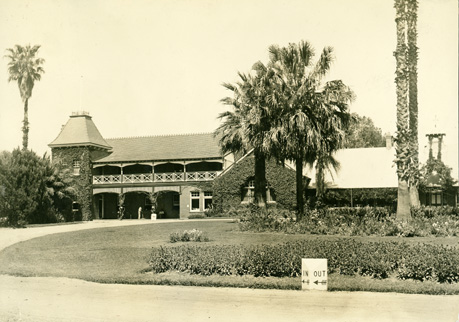
The Hawkesbury campus comprises the former Hawkesbury Agricultural College

The Hawkesbury campus, also known as the Richmond campus, is located on a 1,300-hectare (5.0 sq mi) site in the Hawkesbury Valley in north-western Sydney, next to the town of Richmond. Courses are offered in environmental health, forensic science, nursing, medical science, natural science (environmental, agricultural, horticultural), secondary school science teaching. Hawkesbury campus facilities include research labs, farmland, aquacultural (not operational) and equine facilities, residential halls and cottages, a conference centre, religious centres, a campus social hub called Stable Square, featuring cafeterias, a bar (not operational), a music room and a large collection of Hawkesbury Agricultural College memorabilia.

The campus was originally the Hawkesbury Agricultural College, established by the New South Wales Department of Agriculture in 1891. It later became a College of Advanced Education until 1989, then UWS Hawkesbury (as a member institution of UWS with campuses and Richmond and Quaker's Hill) until 2000. The School of Agriculture operated a commercial dairy until it closed in 2004.

The Hawkesbury campus houses the Hawkesbury Forest Experiment. The experiment consists of twelve giant chambers with individual, living trees in controlled environments which will help predict what will happen to the Australian bush over the next century.

This campus is also home to the forensic science degree and holds a crime scene house, various forensic lab equipment. The Centre for Plant and Food Science is also located at this campus.

Hawkesbury Earthcare Centre, an organic farming organisation with a seedbank is located at Hawkesbury Campus. The centre is affiliated with Henry Doubleday Research and the Alternative Technology Association.

The Hawkesbury campus is next to Richmond TAFE. The nearest railway station is East Richmond

=== Penrith ===
The Penrith Campuses are made up of three areas in two Sydney suburbs; Kingswood, Werrington South and Werrington North.

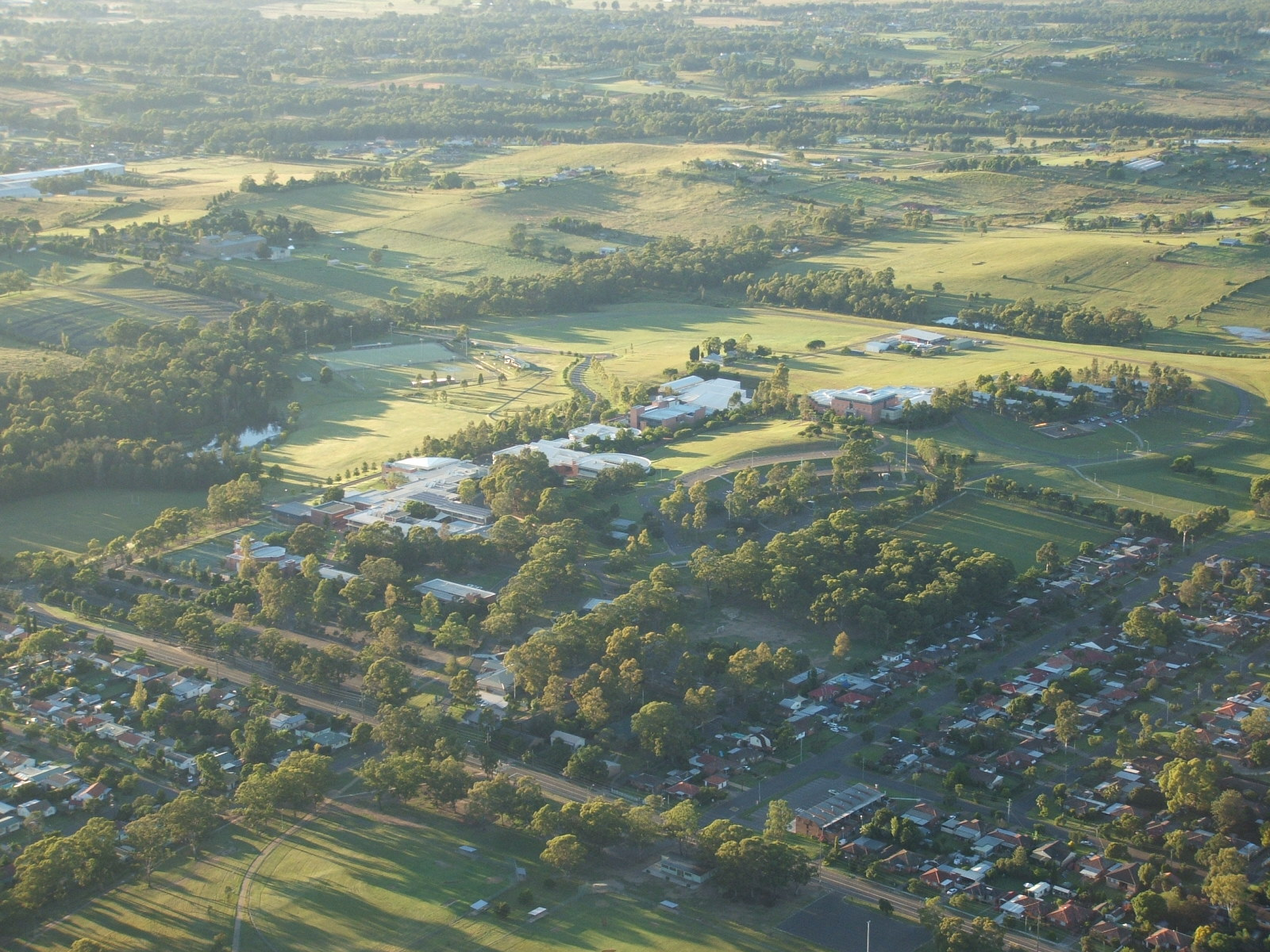
Aerial photograph of the Kingswood campus site

Kingswood has most of the campus's student services and facilities, computer rooms, classrooms and lecture theatres. It also has tennis courts, a gym, a bar (the Swamp Bar) and student accommodation. The Allen Library and Ward Library have now merged and are housed in a new building on the Kingswood campus. The new building (John Phillips Library) has been shortlisted for the 2015 World Architecture Festival (WAF) Awards.

Werrington South has fewer classrooms and lecture theatres. Werrington South also contains the faculty of communications, design and media. This is the campus for the Bachelor of Design (Visual Communications) degree. As of the end of 2016, these classes were no longer offered on this campus, can saw both the Design and Media arts subjects be relocated to Parramatta and the remaining classes be transferred to Kingswood. Majority of this site is now used for staff purposes.

Werrington North used to be a teaching campus but is now administration only, and houses the Chancellor and Vice Chancellor's offices. It also has the Nepean Observatory built by Dr Graeme White (no longer with UWS) and members of the UWS Centre for Astronomy.

Focus areas are split between Werrington South and Kingswood, with most engineering, computing, music and humanities subjects having classes in Kingswood and design having classes at Werrington South.

Western Sydney University also hosts the broadcast centre of Sydney's community television station TVS on Werrington South located in Building BD. As of 2015 TVS no longer broadcasts from this location due to the change of community licensing for stations ending in 2015. This change was made by then communications minister Malcolm Turnbull.

=== Liverpool ===
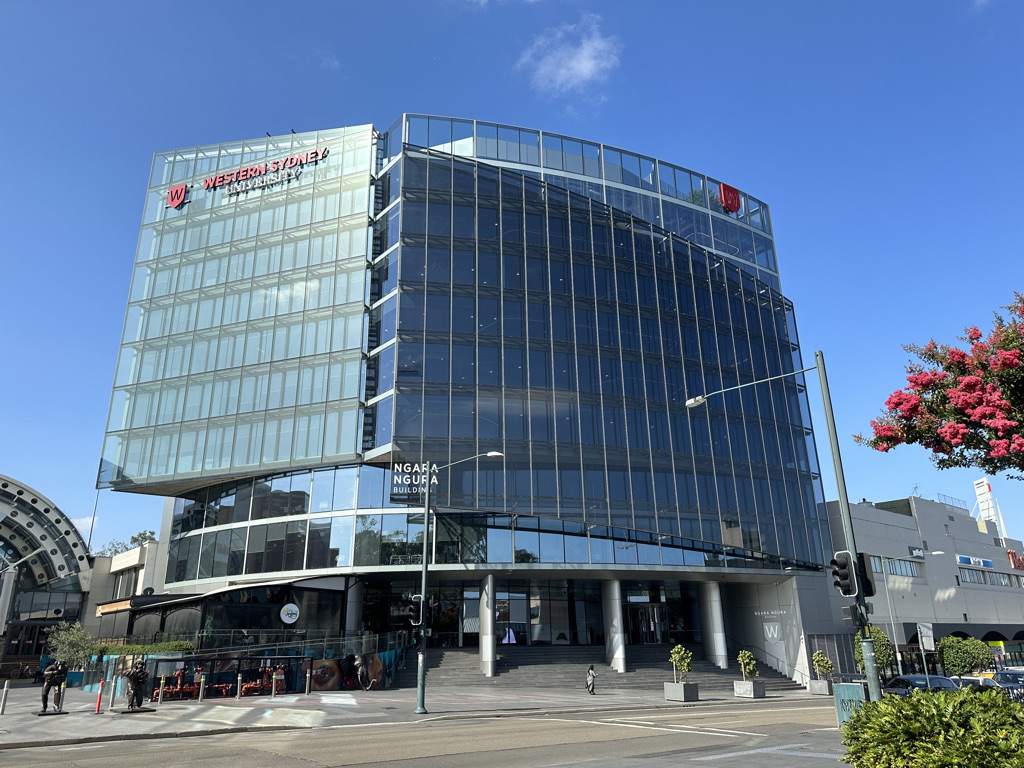
Liverpool campus

WSU opened its vertical campus in Liverpool in 2020. The campus was designed for technologically enhanced learning principally for the disciplines of nursing, social work, anthropology, criminology, and policing. The building won education building of the year in 2018.

=== Sydney City ===
WSU opened the Sydney City campus in 2017. The campus is located opposite of Hyde Park. The campus offers courses in business, arts, communication, engineering, IT, and health.

The campus offers the latest technology such as interactive whiteboards, recording facilities, and fast WIFI. The campus also has the Navitas Library.

=== Surabaya, Indonesia ===
The opening of WSU Surabaya on 9 November 2023, was attended by Indonesian Minister of Education, Culture, Research and Technology Nadiem Makarim, Australian Minister of Education Jason Clare, East Java Governor Khofifah Indar Parawansa, Western Sydney University Chancellor Jennifer Westacott, and Vice-Chancellor and President Barney Glover.

== Governance and structure ==
=== Board of trustees ===
The board of trustees is the peak jurisdiction for the university and has members consisting from Ministerial appointments, academic appointments, and an undergraduate and post-graduate student representative.

==== Chancellor and Vice-Chancellor ====
The fourth Chancellor of the university, appointed in January 2023 is Jennifer Westacott, AO a former senior public servant and partner at KPMG. Westacott followed Professor Peter Shergold, AC who served as Chancellor from 2014–2022.

In July 2024, Distinguished Professor George Williams, AO became the fifth Vice-Chancellor and President of the University. The previous Vice-Chancellor who served from 2014 was Barney Glover, AO.

=== Constituent schools ===
Western Sydney University's academic activity is organised into "schools" of various academic faculties.

The university formerly had nine schools:

- School of Business
- School of Computing, Engineering and Mathematics
- School of Education
- School of Humanities and Communication Arts
- School of Law
- School of Medicine
- School of Nursing and Midwifery
- School of Social Sciences and Psychology
- School of Science and Health

In 2019, the Board of Trustees approved the establishment of the following Schools from January 2020:

- School of Health
- School of Science
- School of Social Sciences
- School of Psychology
- School of the Built Environment, Architecture and Industrial Design
- School of Computer, Data and Mathematical Sciences
- School of Engineering

And the concurrent disestablishment of the following existing Schools:

- School of Science and Health
- School of Social Sciences and Psychology
- School of Computing, Engineering and Mathematics

In addition to the schools of specific academic disciplines, the University has a central Graduate Research School.

==== Badanami Centre for Indigenous Education ====
The Badanami Centre for Indigenous Education provides support to Aboriginal and Torres Strait Islander students. It has a centre on each campus, staffed by people who share their knowledge and experience of life for Indigenous students.

== Academic profile ==
=== Research and publications ===
In 2013 Western Sydney University was successful in obtaining over $5.8 million in grants from the prestigious Australian Research Council for 18 Discovery Projects, placing it 11th out of 40 universities in Australia.

The university publishes the Australian Edition of the Global Media Journal (GMJ/AU), an online journal that publishes "essays and research reports that focus on any aspects in the field of Communication, Media and Journalism". Its first edition was published in 2007.

The university has been publishing Translation & Interpreting. The International Journal of Translation and Interpreting Research, a peer-reviewed academic journal covering all aspects of translation and language interpretation to create a cross-fertilization between research, training and professional practice. The online, open access journal publishes two issues a year. It was established in 2009.

=== Tuition, loans and financial aid ===
For international students starting in 2025, tuition fees range from A$24,840 to A$40,440 per academic year for award programs lasting at least one year. Domestic students (Note: According to the Higher Education Support Act 2003, domestic students include permanent residents and New Zealand citizens in addition to Australian citizens.) may be offered a federally-subsidised Commonwealth Supported Place (CSP) which substantially decreases the student contribution amount billed to the student. The maximum student contribution amount limits that can be applied to CSP students are dependent on the field of study.

Since 2021, Commonwealth Supported Places have also been limited to 7 years of equivalent full-time study load (EFTSL), calculated in the form of Student Learning Entitlement (SLE). Students may accrue additional SLE under some circumstances (e.g. starting a separate one-year honours program) or every 10 years. Domestic students are also able to access the HECS-HELP student loans scheme offered by the federal government. These are indexed to the Consumer or Wage Price Index, whichever is lower, and repayments are voluntary unless the recipient passes an income threshold.

The university also offers several scholarships, which come in the form of bursaries or tuition fee remission.

=== Academic reputation ===
University rankings

Global – Overall
- ARWU World: 301–400 (2025)
- CWTS World: 519 (Note: The CWTS Leiden Ranking is based on P (top 10%).) (2024)
- QS World: 400 (2026)
- QS Employability: 301–500 (2022)
- THE World: 301–350 (2026)
- USNWR Global: =265 (25/26)

National – Overall
- ARWU National: 14–20 (2025)
- CWTS National: 21 (2024)
- ERA National: 19 (2018)
- QS National: 22 (2026)
- THE National: 21–22 (2026)
- USNWR National: 18 (25/26)
- AFR National: =29 (2025)

In the 2024 Aggregate Ranking of Top Universities, which measures aggregate performance across the QS, THE and ARWU rankings, the university attained a position of #302 (21st nationally).

National publications

In the Australian Financial Review Best Universities Ranking 2025, the university was tied #29 amongst Australian universities.

Global publications

In the 2026 Quacquarelli Symonds World University Rankings (published 2025), the university attained a position of #400 (22nd nationally).

In the Times Higher Education World University Rankings 2026 (published 2025), the university attained a position of #301–350 (tied 21–22nd nationally).

In the 2025 Times Higher Education Impact Rankings, the university attained a position of #1 globally for the fourth consecutive year. The rankings assess universities' contributions towards achieving the United Nations Sustainable Development Goals (SDGs).

In the 2025 Academic Ranking of World Universities, the university attained a position of #301–400 (tied 14–20th nationally).

In the 2025–2026 U.S. News & World Report Best Global Universities, the university attained a tied position of #265 (18th nationally).

In the CWTS Leiden Ranking 2024, the university attained a position of #519 (21st nationally).

=== Student outcomes ===
The Australian Government's QILT (Note: Abbreviation for Quality Indicators for Learning and Teaching.) conducts national surveys documenting the student life cycle from enrolment through to employment. These surveys place more emphasis on criteria such as student experience, graduate outcomes and employer satisfaction than perceived reputation, research output and citation counts.

In the 2023 Employer Satisfaction Survey, graduates of the university had an overall employer satisfaction rate of 81%.

In the 2023 Graduate Outcomes Survey, graduates of the university had a full-time employment rate of 74.7% for undergraduates and 87.4% for postgraduates. The initial full-time salary was A$69,400 for undergraduates and A$85,000 for postgraduates.

In the 2023 Student Experience Survey, undergraduates at the university rated the quality of their entire educational experience at 73.7% meanwhile postgraduates rated their overall education experience at 75.8%.

=== Research divisions ===
The Hawkesbury Institute for the Environment was officially opened in 2012, funded by a $40 million grant from the Australian Government Education Investment Fund. It houses some of the largest and most complex facilities in the world for researching the effects of climate change.

The Religion and Society Research Cluster grew out of the Centre for the Study of Contemporary Muslim Studies. It maintains a particular focus on religion, multiculturalism and post-secularism. Cristina Rocha has been director of the centre since 2014.

Western Sydney University has 11 Research Institutes and Centres.

== Student life ==
=== Student unions ===
Prior to 2009, Western Sydney University had two student organisations, each with its own focus and areas of responsibility. These organisations voluntarily shut down operations in 2009. These organisations were responsible for the bulk of extracurricular activities and services provided by the university.

Each organisation previously sourced their funds from Compulsory Student Unionism fees. With the passage of Voluntary Student Unionism legislation, UWS agreed to fund the organisations, but at a substantially reduced level. UWSSA also asked students to pay a voluntary $60 fee.

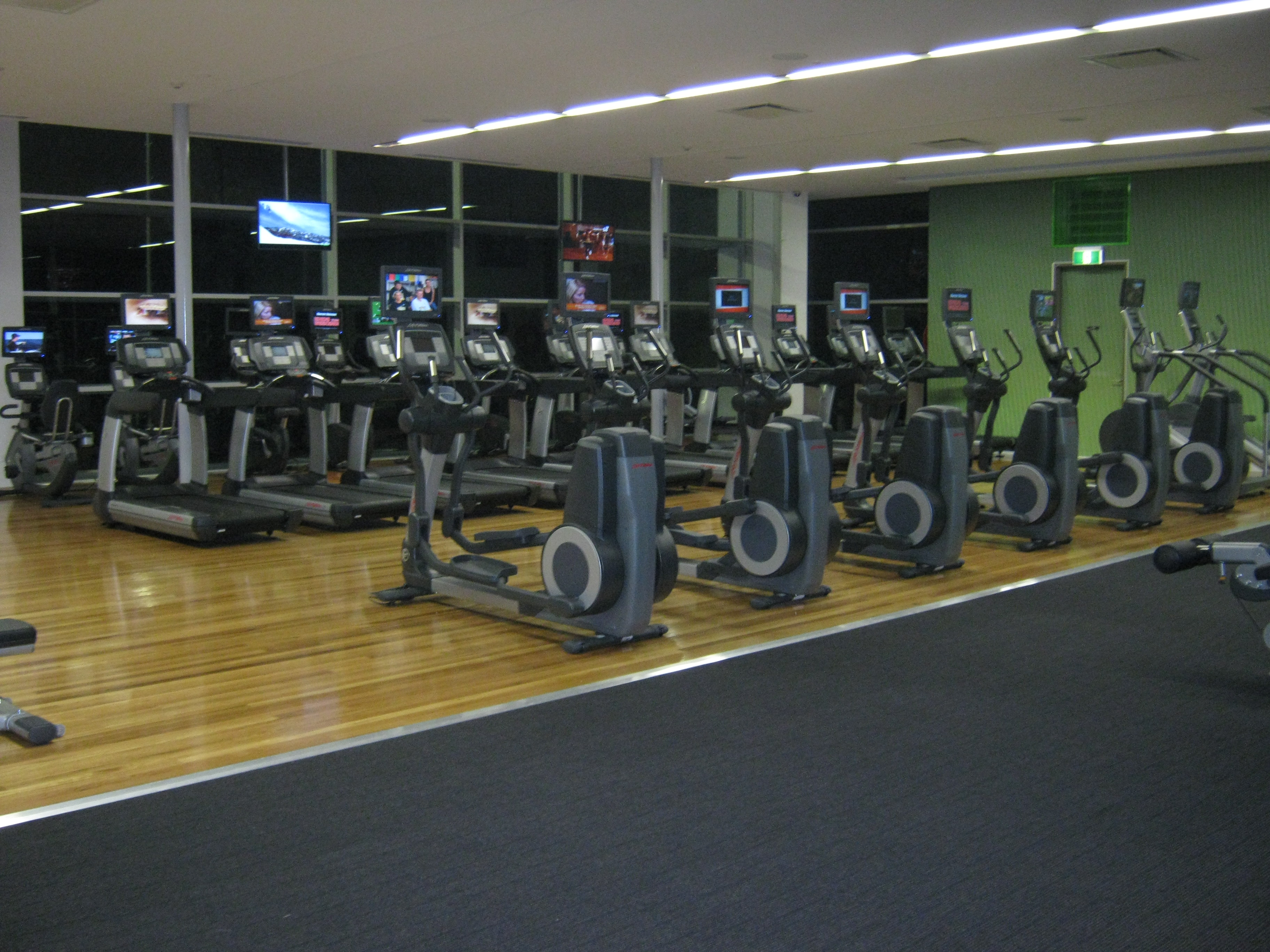
Connect Fitness centre

UWSSA and PAUWS were independent of the university, while UWSConnect is wholly owned by UWS.

- UWSSA Inc. — UWS Students' Association. Its motto was "Bringing life to knowledge " – a twist on the university's motto. It aimed to improve student life at the university by providing welfare and support services, and ran campaigns on issues affecting the student population.
- PAUWS Inc. — The Postgraduate Association of UWS was a student's association for the postgraduate student population at the university.
- UWSConnect Ltd. — UWSConnect is a not-for-profitcompany owned by the university which aims to improve university life by providing bars, cafés, sporting events, recreational activities, etc. It is responsible for organising commercial ties with the university and its students, such as advertising space within the university, vending machines and student discounts and special offers. Connect Fitness — Connect Fitness is a not-for-profit organisation located on the grounds of Western Sydney University with four gyms now in operation over the Kingswood, Hawkesbury, Bankstown and Campbelltown campuses.
- SPORT. — In 1989 the first football club of the university was formed at the Kingswood campus competing against other universities in intervarsity competitions including in Canberra, Armidale and Melbourne.

In 2019 the university restructured student representation, with the Western Sydney University Student Representative Council (SRC) becoming the peak representative body for all enrolled students at Western Sydney University. The Council consists of 22 Representatives elected to represent the various campuses of Western Sydney University, Consisting of campus representative, collective officers, and the executive.

=== Student newspapers ===
WSUPnews is the student newspaper of the Western Sydney University. W'SUP was previously known as cruWsible which was established in 2013.

=== Student accommodation ===
Western Sydney University has on-campus accommodation in the form of the UWS Village located adjacent to its Parramatta Campus. The village was opened in February 2009, providing apartments from one to eight bedrooms. At the time of opening, the village was the third Campus Living Villages property to be established in Sydney after the Macquarie University Village and the Sydney University Village.

== Notable people ==
=== Academics and staff ===
The winner of the 2007 Miles Franklin Literary Award, Alexis Wright, was a UWS Postdoctoral Research Fellow in 2010.

In 2011, author Anita Heiss was Adjunct Associate Professor at the university, attached to the Badanami Centre for Indigenous Education (see below).

Award-winning Australian author Gail Jones was a professor in the university's Writing and Society Research Centre as of 2019.

== Controversies ==
=== Reports of on-campus sexual assault and harassment ===
Between 2011 and 2016, there were 28 officially reported cases of sexual abuse and harassment on campus, resulting in no expulsions, no suspensions, and 7 warnings. The 2017 Australian Human Rights Commission report on sexual assault and harassment gave figures substantially higher than this.

=== Complementary medicine ===
Early in 2016, some controversy surrounding the university's full support of complementary medicine and the university's alleged spying on employees who lodge complaints in good faith emerged in the press. An employee, as well as eminent scientists, criticised the support of the university for complementary medicines such as homeopathy, acupuncture, TCM, and energy healing. The main controversial aspect was the continued support of these pseudo-scientific fields in exchange for continued funding from the naturopathic Jacka Foundation of Natural Therapies.

The National Institute of Complementary Medicine (NICM), a part of Western Sydney University, won the Bent Spoon Award in November 2017. This award is bestowed by the Australian Skeptics to 'the perpetrator of the most preposterous piece of paranormal or pseudo-scientific piffle'. In early 2017, the university unsuccessfully attempted to block their Bent Spoon nomination. This led to a number of articles appearing in the media taking an in-depth look at the National Institute of Complementary Medicine. The university was found to have accepted an untied gift of $10 million from the controversial supplement company, Blackmores. These funds would partly be used to establish a traditional Chinese medicine 'hospital' in Sydney's health precinct, Westmead.

=== Student arrests ===
In 2024, during a pro-Palestine protest in Paramatta South campus, police arrested two students after they had allegedly assaulted two security guards and two police officers. The two students were later granted bail.

== Gallery ==
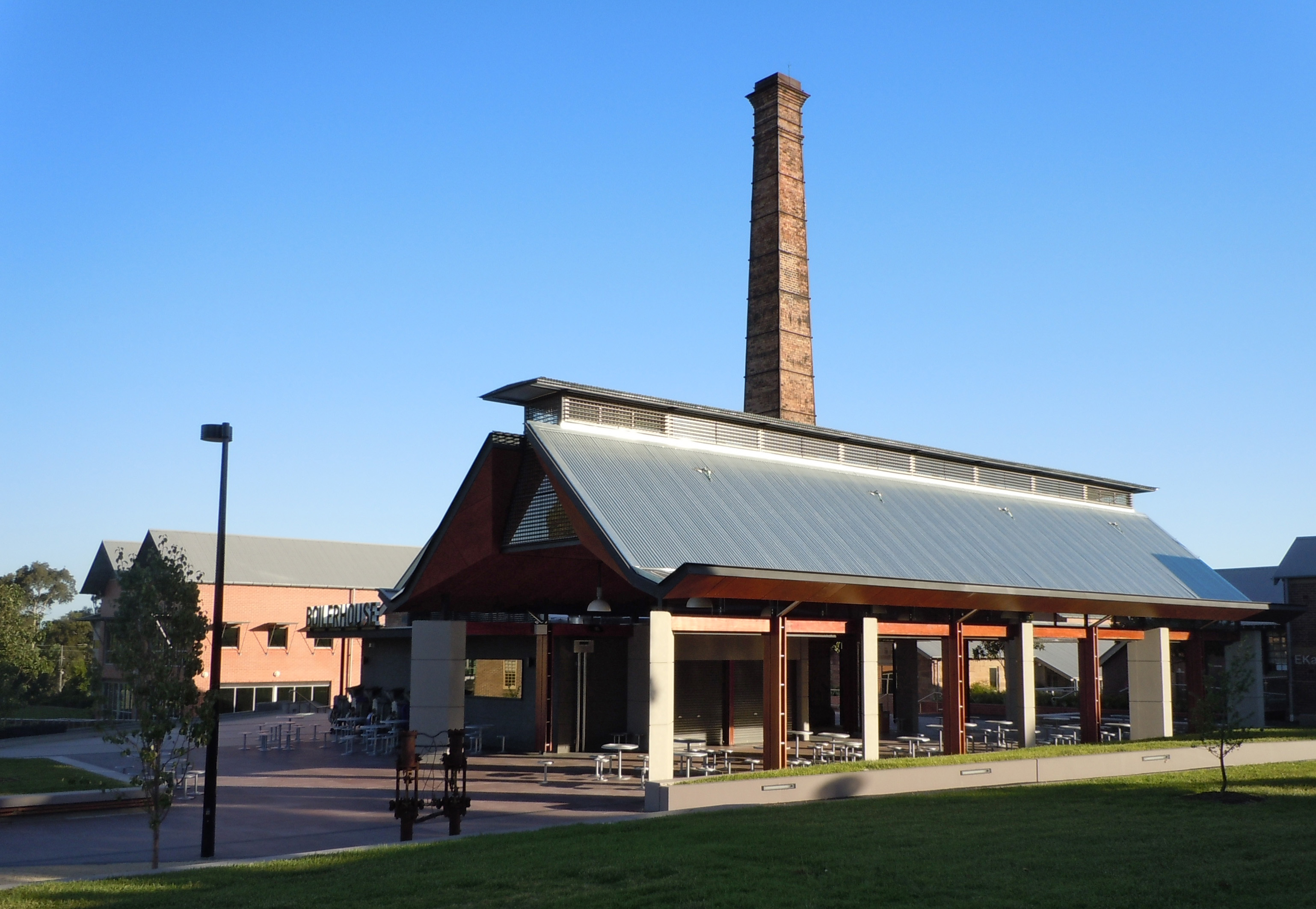
Boilerhouse Restaurant on Parramatta Campus

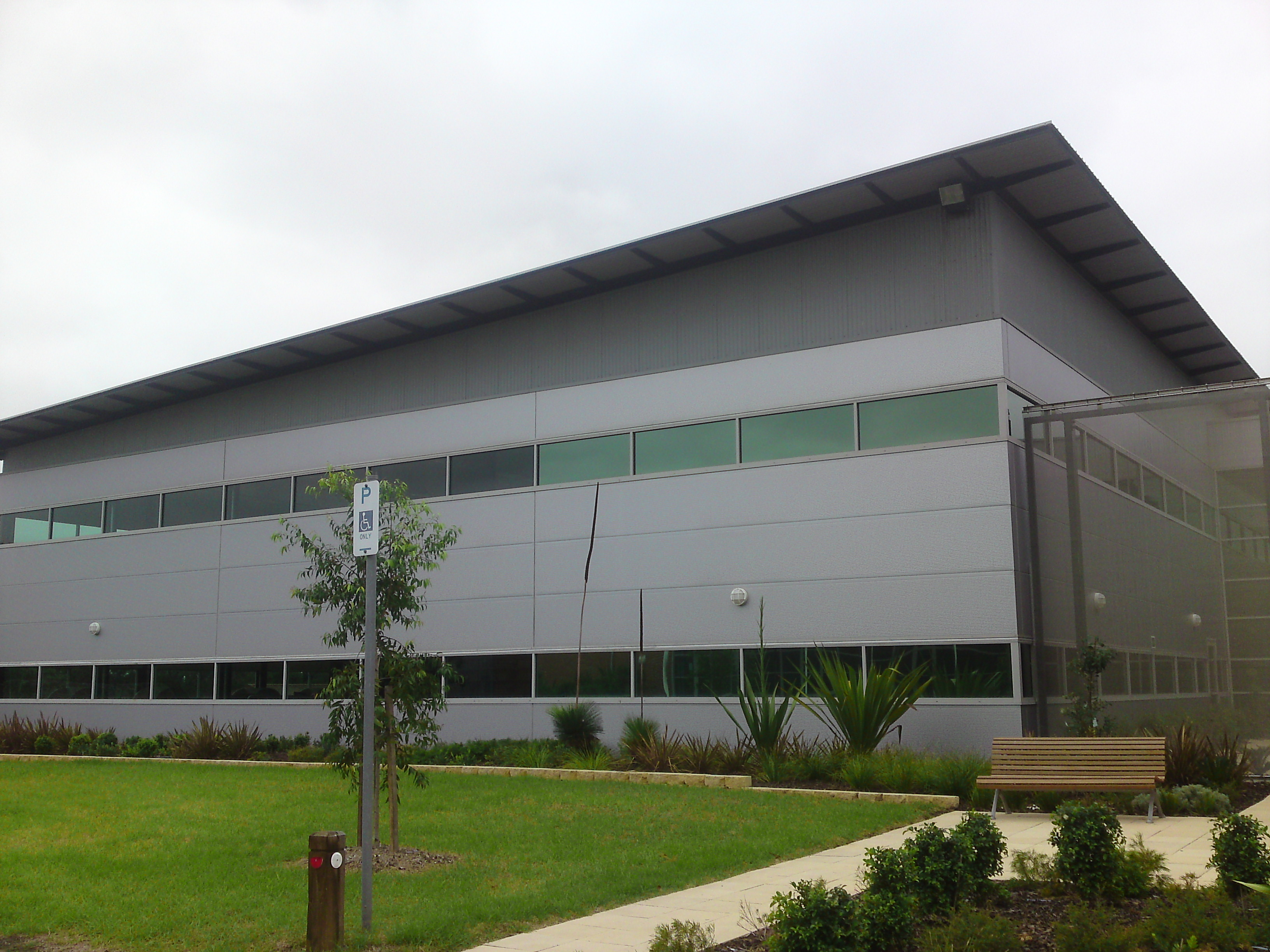
Parramatta Campus Library

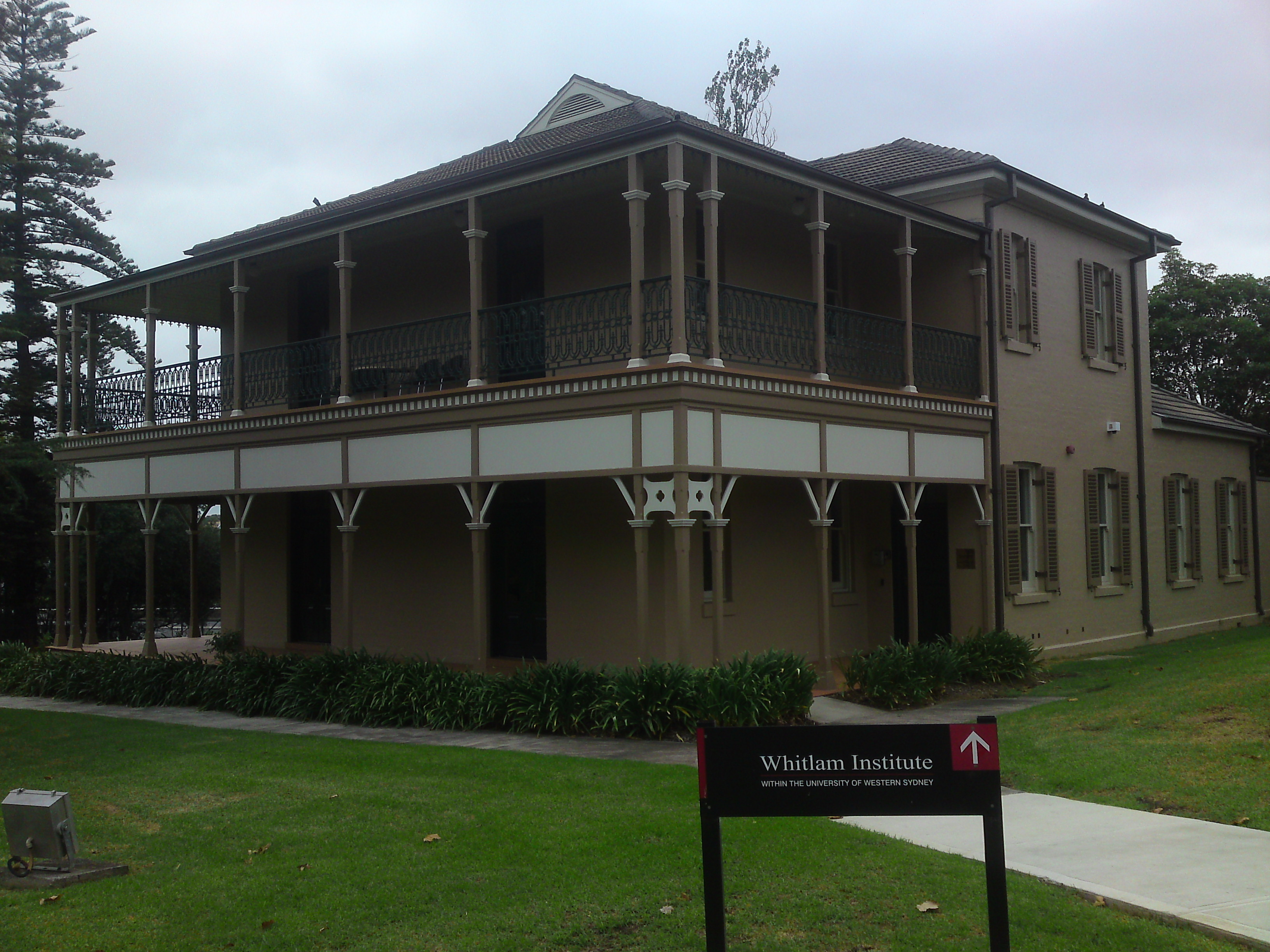
Office of Advancement and Alumni

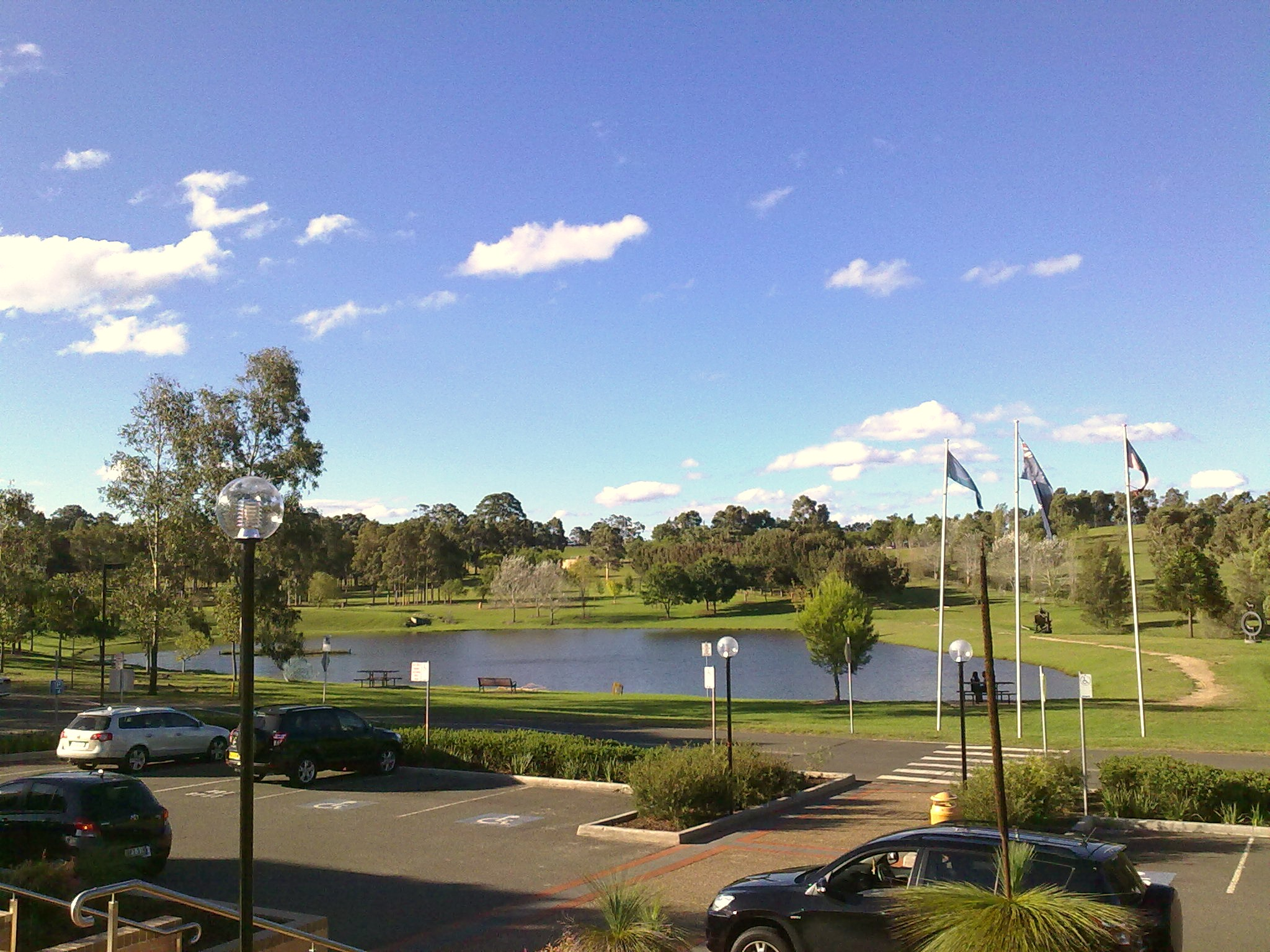
UWS Campbelltown Campus

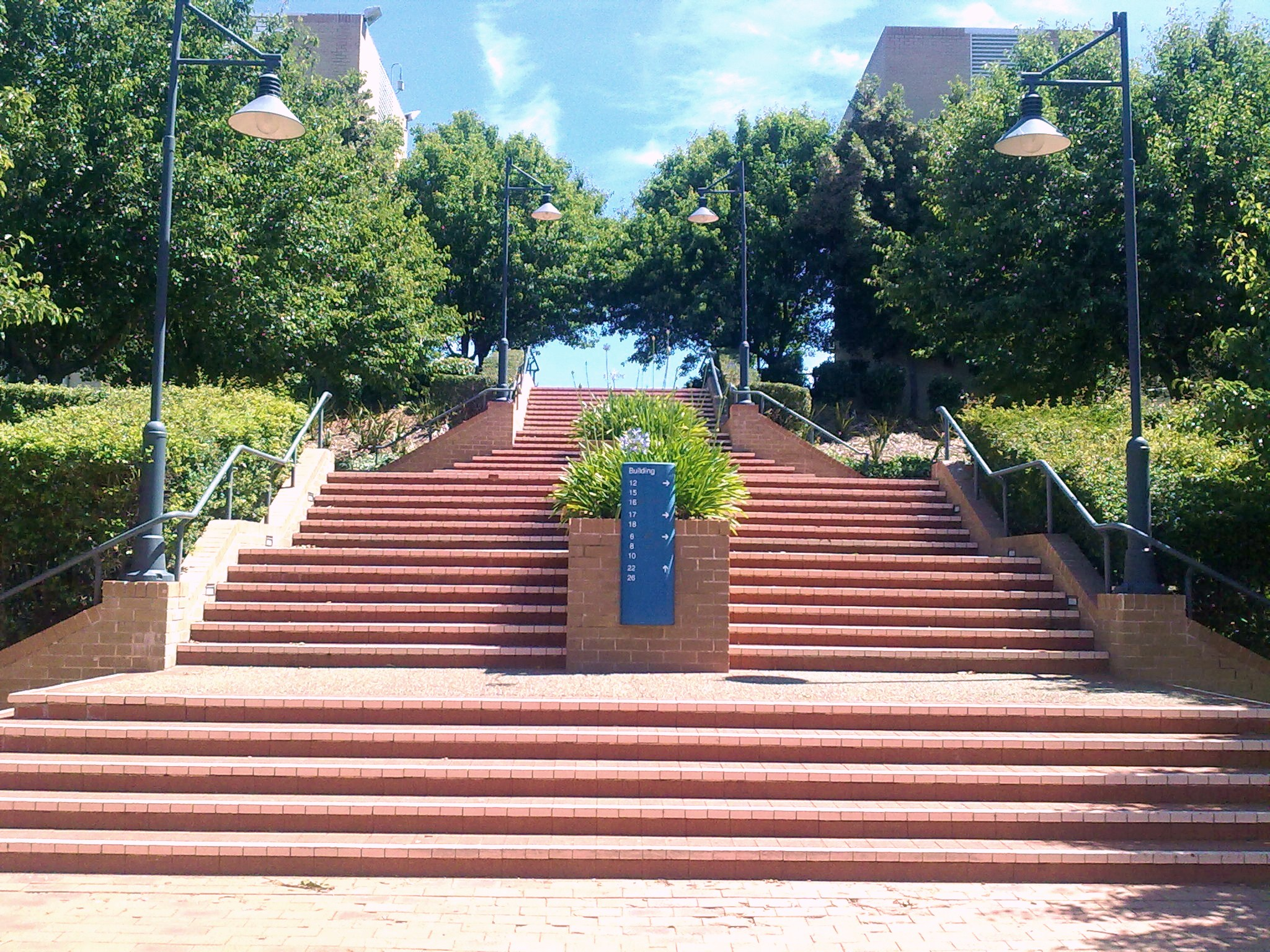
The Stairway to the top, Campbelltown

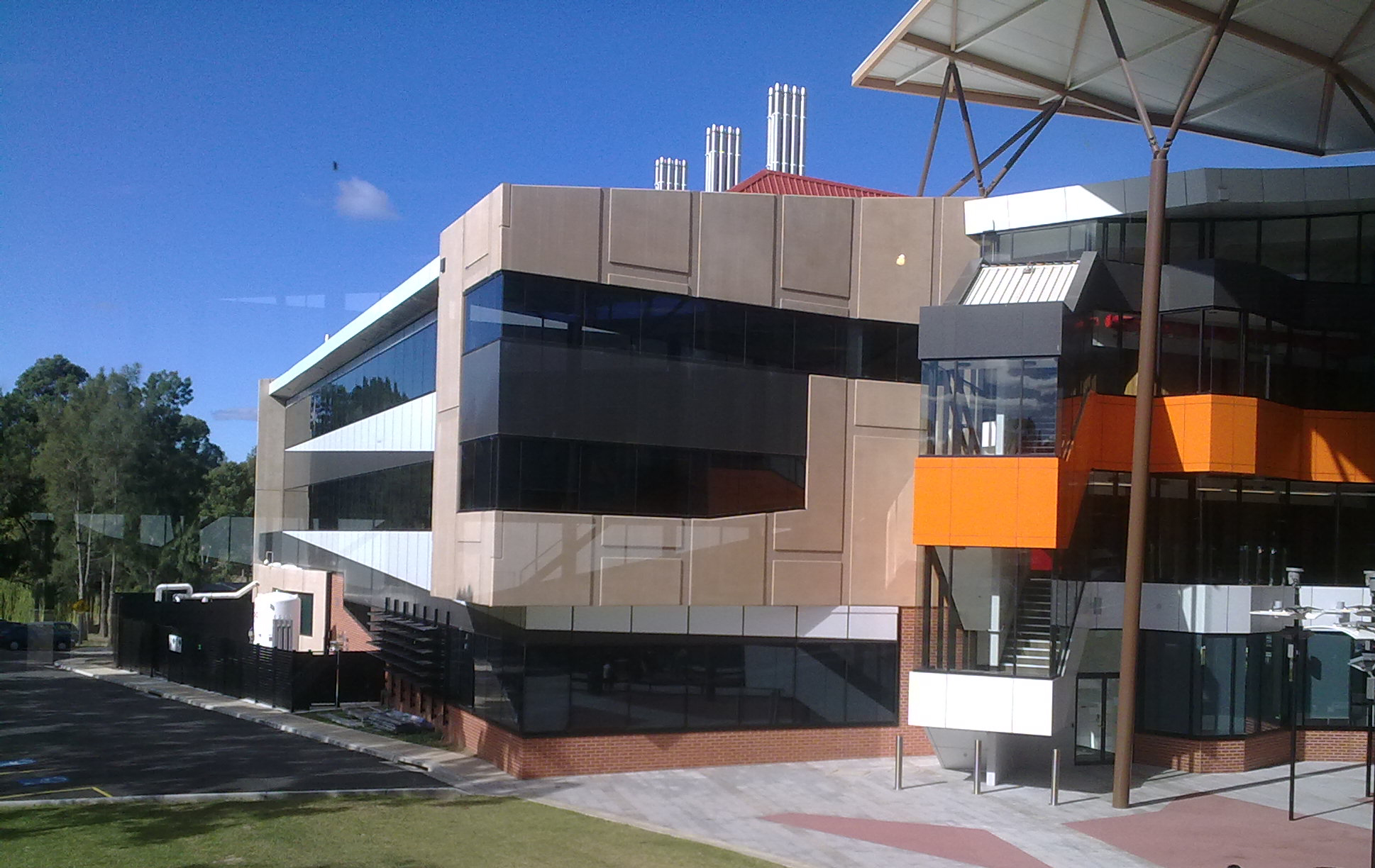
The School of Medicine, Campbelltown

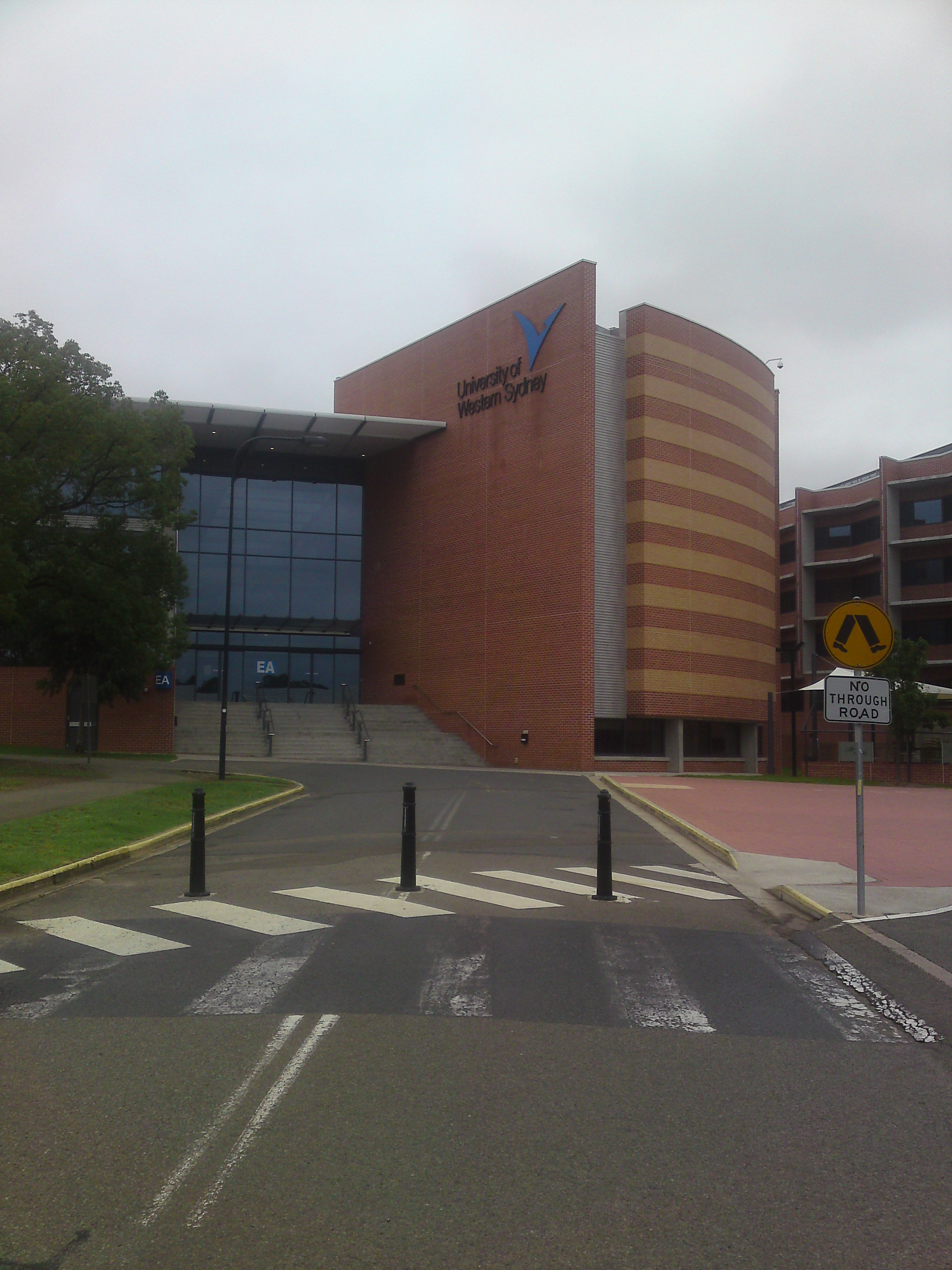
Building EA on Parramatta Campus

== See also ==
- List of universities in Australia
- Television Sydney (TVS)
