= Nepean Dam =

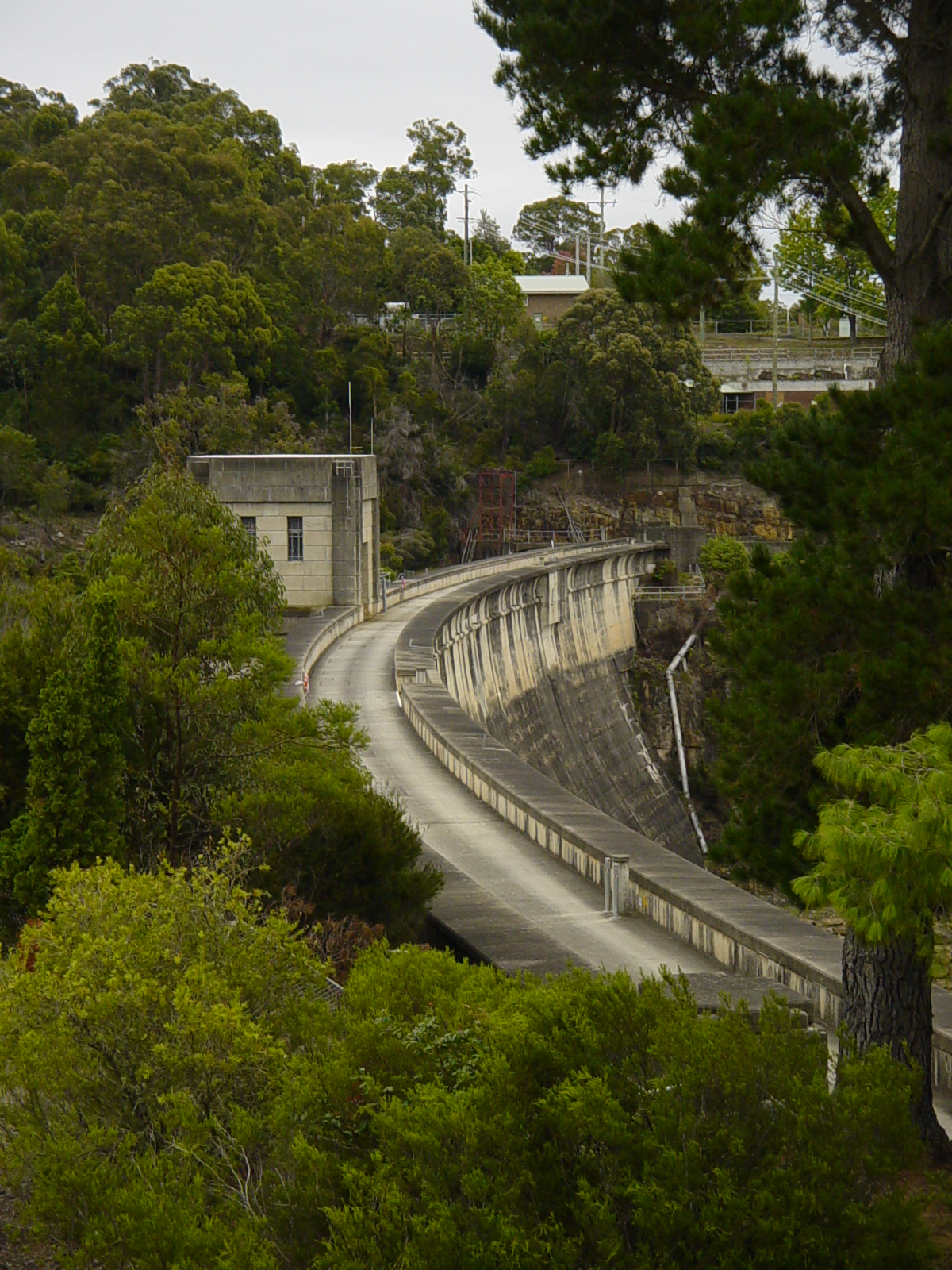
- The curved arch dam wall

- Location within New South Wales
- Location: Avon Dam Road, Bargo, New South Wales
- Coordinates: 34°20′07″S 150°37′01″E
- Purpose: Potable water supply
- Status: Operational
- Construction began: 1926
- Opening date: 1935
- Construction cost: A£2,062,000
- Built by: Ernest Macartney de Burgh
- Operator: WaterNSW

Dam and spillways
- Type of dam: Arch dam
- Impounds: Nepean River
- Height (foundation): 82 metres (269 ft)
- Length: 216 metres (709 ft)
- Elevation at crest: 325 metres (1,066 ft) AHD
- Width (crest): 6.1 metres (20 ft)
- Width (base): 68.6 metres (225 ft)

Reservoir
- Creates: Nepean Reservoir
- Total capacity: 81,400 ML (17,900×10^{6} imp gal; 2.15×10^{10} US gal)
- Catchment area: 319 square kilometres (123 sq mi)
- Surface area: 356.5 hectares (881 acres)

New South Wales Heritage Register
- Official name: Nepean Dam
- Type: Built
- Criteria: a., b., c., d., e., f., g.
- Designated: 18 November 1999
- Part of: Utilities – Water group
- Reference no.: 01368

The Nepean Dam is a heritage-listed dam split across Avon in the Wingecarribee Shire and Bargo in the Wollondilly Shire, both in New South Wales, Australia. The reservoir created by the dam spreads across Avon, Bargo and also Yerrinbool in Wingecarribee Shire. The Nepean Dam is one of four dams and weirs in the catchment of the Upper Nepean Scheme, in New South Wales, Australia, and provides water to the Macarthur and Illawarra regions, the Wollondilly Shire, and metropolitan Sydney. Completed in 1935 under the supervision of Ernest Macartney de Burgh, the dam is currently managed by the WaterNSW and is listed on the New South Wales State Heritage Register.

== History ==
The Upper Nepean Scheme was commenced in 1880 after it was realised that the Botany Swamps scheme was insufficient to meet Sydney's water supply needs. The Nepean project consisted of the construction of a weir across the Nepean River to divert of the rivers Cataract, Cordeaux, Avon and Nepean, to the Prospect Reservoir.

By 1902, however, the water supply was found to be inadequate and a Royal Commission was held which recommended impounding the waters of the Cataract River by means of a major storage dam. The Cataract Dam was completed in 1907. In November 1918, a Board of Experts was appointed by the Government to draw up recommendations for the amplification of the Sydney water supply. It was upon the recommendations of this body, as approved by the Public Works Committee of the NSW Parliament, that not only Cordeaux, but also Avon and Nepean Dams were built. The Cordeaux Dam was completed in 1926 and the Avon Dam in 1927, on the Cordeaux and Avon Rivers respectively. As Cordeaux and Avon Dams were approaching completion, a fourth dam, Nepean Dam, was commenced in 1925.

The site chosen was on the Nepean River, about 7 miles (11.3 km) above the point where the Cordeaux River joins the main stream at Pheasants Nest Pass and about 4 miles (6.4 km) by road southeast of Bargo railway station. The dam was designed by engineers of the Public Works Department under the direction of the Chief Engineer for Water Supply and Sewerage, EM de Burgh.

Construction of the dam was undertaken by the Public Works Department until 1 September 1928, at which time the department was re-organised and the majority of the staff associated with water supply were transferred to the Board of Water Supply and Sewerage, who continued the work on the dam. At that date, excavation for the foundations of the wall was complete and placing of concrete about to begin. Most of the plant and equipment used for the construction of Avon Dam was dismantled and re-erected at the Nepean Dam site, including the cableways and timber towers. A suspension bridge was constructed across the Nepean River which was later used at Warragamba Dam.

Railway sidings were established on the Main Southern railway line at a point between Bargo and Yerrinbool. Transport to the dam site was again by light railway, on this occasion of standard gauge. This avoided transhipment from the Government vehicles bringing materials from large commercial quarries, effectively making the line an extended privately owned siding. The line was 4 km (2.5 mi) long through gentle countryside. Trains were worked by a variety of locomotives, including a former Sydney Steam Tram Motor. Additionally, there was a system of narrow (610 mm / 2 ft) gauge lines in use at the dam construction site.

A township for workers was constructed of timber obtained from the clearing of the catchment for the Avon Dam. This township provided four and five-roomed cottages for the married men and had metalled roads with concrete kerbing. A typical working man's accommodation consisted of a simple timber hut with a galvanised roof. Later, a barracks was constructed for single men. A Public School and recreation halls were also provided, as were full-time medical staff and facilities.

Shortly after construction of the dam was transferred from the Public Works Department to the Water Board, it was decided upon the recommendation of the Chief Engineer of the Board, Gerald Haskins, that the height of the dam wall be increased by 25 ft (7.6 m). This added nearly 50% to the storage capacity of the dam.

Work on the dam continued until March 1930, when the depression compelled the Board first to curtail and then suspend work completely. The work recommenced on 12 June 1933 and continued without interruption until completion of the dam in 1935. Although the dam was ready to store water by September, 1935, there was little rainfall on its catchment during the ensuing three years; however, by October 1938 the dam was overflowing. At this time it was realised that scouring at the toe of the foundations of the dam required an alteration to the direction of the flow of floodwaters discharged over the spillway weir. This was done by constructing a concrete channel approximately 2,000 feet (610 m) long, 120 feet (37 m) wide, widening to 432 feet (132 m) at the discharge weir. Construction of the channel commenced in July 1943, and was completed in November 1947.

In the late 1960s, as part of a plan to interconnect the various water supply systems for Sydney Wollongong and Sutherland, a tunnel was constructed between the Nepean Dam and the Avon Dam (which now supplies the Wollongong area). This allows water to be transferred in either direction, as required.

In the 1980s, work was undertaken on Nepean Dam to alleviate uplift pressure on, and leakage through, the foundations of the dam wall, in accordance with modern design criteria. The downstream face of the wall was supported with an embankment of quarried sandstone blocks and sandstone fill, the latter being compacted by grid and vibratory rollers. It was similar to the work undertaken at the same time for Avon Dam.

== Description ==
The Nepean Dam is a large cyclopean masonry dam. This consists of large blocks of sandstone quarried at the site, embedded in and surrounded by sandstone concrete. To ensure water-tightness, all construction joints are grouted. The upstream face consists of blue metal concrete 5 feet (1.5 m) thick while the downstream face is of similar material 3 feet (0.91 m) thick. Both of the facing concrete sections are merged progressively into the central sandstone masonry concrete. All the latest improvements in dam design and construction of the day were embodied in the work, building upon the experience gained from the construction of the previous three Upper Nepean Scheme dams. Inspection galleries are provided, with pressure and drainage pipes from the foundations, and rubble drains lead into them. Provision is made for any leakage of water past the copper seals in the contraction joints to be conducted into the galleries and thence drained away. To facilitate the work of maintenance staff, an electric lift was provided in the wall. The water is discharged through two 36 inches (91 cm) diameter outlet pipes controlled by Ring Falkner gate valves and FCD valves.

After construction was complete and the dam had filled, the spillway weir was altered by the construction on the western side of the stream of a concrete channel approximately 2,000 feet (610 m) long and 120 feet (37 m) wide, widening to 432 feet (132 m) at the discharge weir.

The Nepean Reservoir has a small storage capacity in relation to its large catchment area. While its capacity is much the same as that of Cataract and Cordeaux Reservoirs, its catchment basin is two and a half times as extensive as Cataract and three and a half times as extensive as Cordeaux. The Nepean Reservoir therefore fills more rapidly and, under normal conditions, is drawn upon more freely than the other reservoirs.

Specifications of Nepean Dam:

- Total capacity: 17,898 million gallons (81,400 million litres).
- Years of construction: 1926–1935.
- Cost: £2,062,000 ($4,124,000).
- Crest level above sea level: 1,066 feet (325 m).
- Amount of concrete in the wall: 300,218 cu yards (229,600 cu metres).
- Length of crest including pylons: 710 feet (220 m).
- Length of spillway weir: 436 feet (133 m).
- Width at crest: 20 feet (6.1 m).
- Width at base: 225 feet (69 m).
- Full supply level above sea level: 1,051 feet (320 m).
- Greatest depth of water: 225 feet (69 m).
- Area of lake: 881 acres (357 hectares).
- Area of catchment: 123 sq miles (319km2).
- Average annual rainfall: 42.3 inches (1,070 mm).
- Average annual yield: 23,515 million gallons (106,993 million litres).
- Average annual evaporation: 38.5 inches (980 mm).

The Nepean Dam continues to supply Sydney with water. It is discharged as required into the river bed below the dam and flows to Pheasant's Nest where it is diverted by a weir to the Nepean Tunnel, 4 1/2 miles (7.2 km) long, discharging into the Cataract Tunnel, 2 miles (3.2 km) long, emerging into the Upper Canal, by which it is conveyed to Prospect Reservoir. The Nepean Dam is now also cross-connected to the Avon Dam, which supplies the Wollongong area, to provide additional water supply to that district. If necessary, it can also receive additional water from the Shoalhaven Scheme. Water is supplied to the Picton and Bargo districts from Nepean Dam, with this water treated and filtered in the Nepean Water Filtration Plant, a treatment facility added to the dam to improve the water quality to this district, which is now supplied directly from Nepean Dam.

The Nepean Dam includes within its area three brick residential staff cottages, two apparently dating from the 1960s and one from the 1980s, and two older weatherboard cottages, one of which, utilised by the Filtration Plant staff, is the original Resident Engineer's Cottage. Just north of the entrance to the Dam picnic area are the former Catchment workshops, a series of small corrugated iron and weatherboard utilitarian buildings which were formerly the central maintenance facility for the Upper Nepean Catchment area. They remain in use at a low scale by the Sydney Catchment Authority and include a weatherboard residential cottage similar to the second of the weatherboard residences at the Dam. The area of the former construction village for the Dam remains undeveloped and heavily overgrown, with remnant road borders and evidence of buildings visible on the ground.

The public area has been maintained by the Water Board and its successors, with picnic grounds, landscaped gardens and a children's playground. Remnants of the interwar period landscape at the Nepean Dam site are mainly concentrated in two areas - around a small park, with cement faux rockwork bedding edges, to the east of the dam wall, including a long line of Roman Cypress (Cupressus sempervirens) along the spillway alignment; and in a park-like picnic area along a terrace above the dam. Features of the latter area include pleasant plantings of mixed deciduous and evergreen exotic trees and Australian trees enclosing a long raised shelf, which is the remnant railway platform from the temporary construction railway, with a series of small timber picnic shelters with a somewhat log cabin-style character. Nearby a considerable line of dry-packed sandstone walling has been used and drystone walling is used generally to control access. The main entry road includes the remains of an old Cypress avenue and an ornamental gum avenue.

== Heritage listing ==
Nepean Dam was the fourth of the four water supply dams built as part of the development of the Upper Nepean Water Supply Scheme, one of the most important engineering works and items of public infrastructure in Australia, and had the highest wall of all the NSW water supply dams at the time of its construction. It was designed by the NSW Public Works Department under the direction of one of Australia's leading water supply engineers, E.M. de Burgh.

The completion of the Nepean Dam was a significant step in the continuing process of providing a reliable water supply for Sydney and surrounding areas as part of the Upper Nepean Scheme. Even by the international standards of the time, Nepean was a large dam and was a significant work of engineering in its day. It continues to play an important role as a major source of water supply for the Sydney region. Additionally, the Nepean Dam is a handsome, well proportioned structure with strong Stripped Classical style architectural character which complements the monumental nature of the structure and its attractive natural surroundings.

Nepean Dam includes a range of ancillary structures which form components of the overall site, including residential cottages of various ages for operational staff and are representative of their age and type. The former Resident Engineer's cottage is an attractive example of a vernacular cottage of the early twentieth century. The public picnic grounds include a former construction railway platform now housing picnic shelters, and the site of the original construction village remains undeveloped and is now an overgrown archaeological site. The Nepean Dam picnic areas and gardens contain a cultural landscape resource - including remnants of its interwar period plantings, layout and detailing, and extensive areas of bushland - of regional value. The finely detailed dam structures of large-scaled concrete in Art Deco-style sit within a broader landscape setting of outstanding scenic quality.

Nepean Dam was listed on the New South Wales State Heritage Register on 18 November 1999 having satisfied the following criteria.

The place is important in demonstrating the course, or pattern, of cultural or natural history in New South Wales.

Nepean Dam is located within the Upper Nepean Catchment Area which was developed with the completion of the Cataract and Nepean Tunnels in 1888, as the fourth source of water supply for Sydney. The potential of the Upper Nepean Catchment Area to supply water was fully developed through the construction of four major dams between 1903 and 1936. Nepean Dam is the last of these dams to have been completed. The Upper Nepean Catchment Area continues to supply the regions of Sydney and Illawarra, with the Nepean Dam providing a supply to Sydney, Macarthur, Bargo and Illawarra (through the Avon/Nepean Tunnel) regions.

Nepean Dam was the fifth of the major water supply/irrigation dams constructed in NSW during the first half of the twentieth century. Whilst the dam was designed by the Public Works Department of NSW, the technologies used in the dam are representative of methods developed by that authority, the planning and scale of the construction techniques are more representative of the Water Board.

In conjunction with other Metropolitan Dams and Woronora Dam built in 1941, the impounded water of Nepean Dam provided one of the major sources of water for domestic and industrial consumption in metropolitan Sydney, the largest city in NSW. In providing water for metropolitan Sydney during this era the dam, in ensuring security of supply, contributed to the extensive residential, commercial and industrial development of Sydney during the 1930s and 1950s. Nepean Dam was constructed over a period of ten years between 1926 and 1936, a protracted construction period which is directly related to the Great Depression and a period of Government financial stringency. The completion of the dam during this period was one of the major public works projects undertaken in the State.

The place has a strong or special association with a person, or group of persons, of importance of cultural or natural history of New South Wales's history.

The design and construction of Nepean Dam was initially undertaken by the Water Supply and Sewerage Branch of the NSW Public Works Department, and later developed by the Construction Branch of the Water Board. The construction of the dam drew upon the knowledge and experience of a number of engineers employed in the branches including E.M. de Burgh (Chief Engineer), and Gerald Haskins (the first engineer-in-chief of the former Water Board).

The place is important in demonstrating aesthetic characteristics and/or a high degree of creative or technical achievement in New South Wales.

The wall of Nepean Dam is an engineering work imbued with a sense of high aesthetic value expressed through the short curved high wall set with the steeply sided valley of the Nepean River.

The design and finishes of the crest house and lower valve house in the Inter War Stripped Classical style were prepared by the engineers of the Water Board. The architectural detailing evokes a sense of monumentalism that is ideally suited to the context of the dam.

The dam is set within the valley of the Nepean River. Upstream of the dam wall this setting is characterised by the broad expanse of the pool of water bordered by the crests of the valley sides. Downstream of the dam wall the setting is characterised by the steeper inclines that graduate into the gorge created by the river's flow over time. Collectively this topography at time of high water level imparts a picturesque scene when viewed from select vantage points above and on the dam wall.

The former resident officer's cottage erected at the time of the dam's construction to house the resident engineer is an intact example of the high standard of accommodation provided for resident Public Works Department Senior staff.

The place has strong or special association with a particular community or cultural group in New South Wales for social, cultural or spiritual reasons.

The dam and grounds are recognised by the National Trust of Australia (NSW) as being a place which is part of the cultural environment of Australia, which has aesthetic, historical, architectural, archaeological, scientific and social significance for future generations, as well as for the present community of NSW.

The dam and grounds are recognised by the Heritage Council of NSW as a place which is of significance to NSW in relation to its historical, scientific, cultural, social, archeological, natural and aesthetic values.

The place has potential to yield information that will contribute to an understanding of the cultural or natural history of New South Wales.

The cyclopean masonry of the dam is an excellent late example of this type of gravity dam construction in the Inter War era incorporating inspection galleries, contraction joints, and ground surface drainage system which demonstrate the principal characteristics of this technology at this time.

Terraces and platforms adjoining the dam abutments demarcate the location of plant and equipment used in the construction of the dam, in particular the location of the cableway headtowers, the railway terraces and concrete mixing plant platform.

The hillside near the upper picnic area was the site of the original construction township and retains an intact road formation, kerbing and guttering and tennis courts from that era. The integrity is such that collectively these features may potentially provide further insight into the lifestyles of the employees that constructed the dam.

The place possesses uncommon, rare or endangered aspects of the cultural or natural history of New South Wales.

The wall of the Nepean Dam is the highest of all the dams constructed in the Upper Nepean Catchment Area. Nepean Dam is one of three dams in NSW which incorporate extensive Inter War Stripped Classical architectural detailing. The crest and valve houses and inlet works retain original ironwork which represent a substantial repository of water supply delivery technology of the era. The use of an electronic lift in the wall (albeit now decommissioned) is a first for NSW. The completion of the dam necessitated the construction of a standard gauge (1835mm) railway line from Bargo which is unique in context of dam construction in NSW.

The extent of foresight in planning the execution and design of the construction township is likely to be a first ion NSW in regard to dam construction, setting a practice which was further developed at Woronora Dam, and came to be exemplified at Warragamba Dam.

The remnant platforms and terraces of the construction area are the largest in scale and most intact in regard to finishes and planning of all four of the Metropolitan Dams. The means of delivering stores and raw material through the network of railway lines and raised platforms, and the system of suspension footbridge and aerial stone ropeway to provide access and material over the gorge were particularly sophisticated for the time and foretells later developments at Warragamba Dam. The reservoir of the Nepean Dam is the second largest source of water in the whole of the network administered by SCA for the supply of metropolitan Sydney.

The place is important in demonstrating the principal characteristics of a class of cultural or natural places/environments in New South Wales.

Nepean Dam is representative of a type of dam (cyclopean masonry gravity dam) constructed in NSW by the Water Supply and Sewerage Branch of the Public Works Department during the first half of the twentieth century. Key representative e attributes of the dam's design and construction include the use of cyclopean masonry bedded in sandstone concrete, use of blue metal concrete in the wall facings, use of a spillway set away from the gravity wall, valve and crest houses attractively designed and finished to a high standard, the use of an array of upstream intakes to regulate the quality of water supply, the internal inspection gallery, the foundation drainage system, the contraction joints, and the internal drainage system.

The upgrading works to the spillway and dam wall in the 1980s, with the rock embankment to make the dam meet modern safety requirements are representative of modern-day safe operating practice.

The construction technologies used at Nepean Dam are representative of dams constructed in NSW through the first half of the twentieth century. Key representative attributes include the use of cableways, the building of temporary camps to house labourers and tradesman, building of semi-permanent cottages to house salaried staff, the construction of terraced platforms for plant and machinery, mechanisation of concrete production, the construction of a purpose-built road of access and tramway to transport men, supplies and materials from the nearest railhead to the construction site, the building of permanent infrastructure such as water supply for plant and men and horses, and the use of electricity to power plant and equipment.

The rehabilitation of tracts of land scarred in the construction process employed at Nepean Dam through beautification works is representative of practices undertaken at other dams throughout NSW. Key representative attributes of this practice include utilising the former terraced construction platforms as picnic areas and lookouts, and utilising the former construction roads and tramway for vehicular access to the dam site and dam wall.

The practice of ongoing maintenance of the Nepean Dam wall after completion through the surveillance of resident staff and workshop facilities is representative of procedures undertaken at other dams and weirs constructed in NSW.

The provision of public amenity at the dam site is representative of the use of large water supply and irrigation dams in NSW as places for recreation by the greater community.

== See also ==
- List of reservoirs and dams in New South Wales
- Sydney Water
- Shoalhaven Scheme
- Upper Canal System
