= Avon Dam =

Dam in Avon, New South Wales, Australia

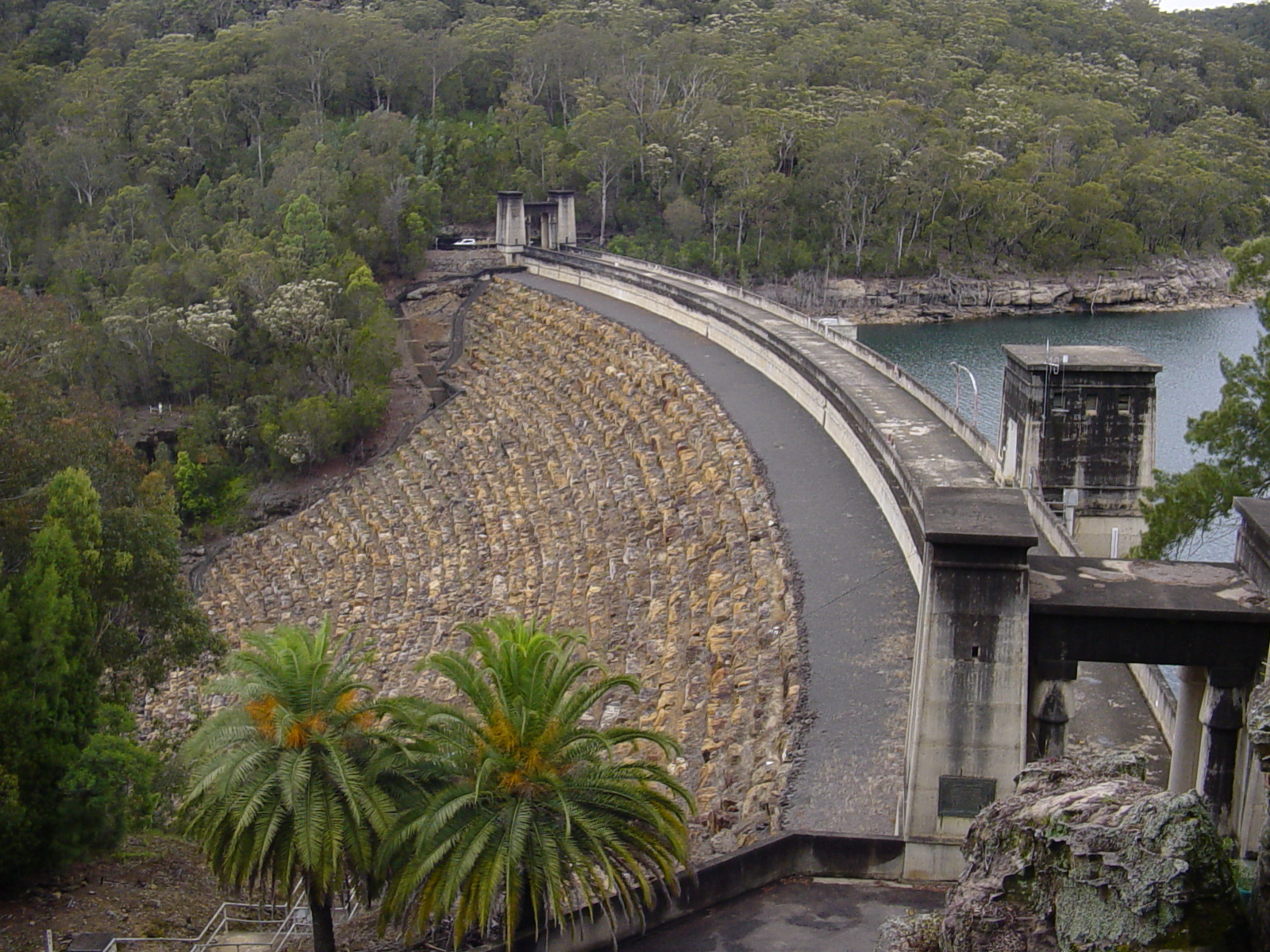
- The curved dam wall

- Location within New South Wales
- Location: Avon Dam Road, Avon Dam, New South Wales
- Coordinates: 34°21′09″S 150°38′30″E
- Purpose: Water supply
- Status: Operational
- Construction began: 1921
- Opening date: 20 January 1928
- Construction cost: A£1,047,000
- Built by: Ernest Macartney de Burgh
- Operator: Sydney Catchment Authority

Dam and spillways
- Type of dam: Gravity dam
- Impounds: Avon River
- Height (foundation): 22 m (72 ft)
- Length: 223 m (732 ft)
- Width (crest): 6 m (20 ft)
- Width (base): 61 m (200 ft)

Reservoir
- Creates: Avon Reservoir
- Total capacity: 146,700 ML (118,900 acre⋅ft)
- Catchment area: 142 km^{2} (55 sq mi)
- Surface area: 1,057 ha (2,610 acres)
- Maximum water depth: 64 m (210 ft)
- Website waternsw.com.au

New South Wales Heritage Register
- Official name: Avon Dam
- Type: Built
- Criteria: a., b., c., d., e., f., g.
- Designated: 18 November 1999
- Part of: Utilities – Water group
- Reference no.: 01358

The Avon Dam is a gravity dam across the Avon River, located at Avon, in the New South Wales Southern Highlands, Australia. It is one of four dams and weirs in the catchment of the Upper Nepean Scheme, providing water to the Macarthur and Illawarra regions, the Wollondilly Shire, and metropolitan Sydney. The dam was completed in 1927 under the supervision of Ernest Macartney de Burgh, and is currently managed by WaterNSW. The dam was added to the New South Wales State Heritage Register in 1999.

== History ==
The Upper Nepean Scheme was commenced in 1880 after it was realised that the Botany Swamps scheme was insufficient to meet Sydney's water supply needs. The Nepean project consisted of the construction of a weir across the Nepean River to divert the rivers Cataract, Cordeaux, Avon and Nepean, to the Prospect Reservoir.

By 1902 the original Nepean scheme was found also to be inadequate, after a severe drought had again depleted the water supply. A Royal Commission was appointed in 1902 to report on the water supply situation and in that same year, it recommended the construction of the Cataract Dam, to impound the waters of the Cataract River at a site upstream of Broughton's Pass. Construction of the dam was completed about the end of 1907.

From 1907, rainfall on the catchment area was very low and it was not until January 1911 that Cataract Dam first filled to capacity. This, together with the greatly increased rate of consumption of water, stressed the need for additional water storage.

The Nepean River watershed, from a topographical standpoint, was found to be very favourable for the construction of large water storage works at moderate cost. Rivers such as the Cordeaux, Avon and Nepean, located in narrow gorges, provided very suitable dam sites, with solid rock foundations at a shallow depth. Sandstone could easily be quarried into rough rectangular blocks and used for the construction. These features led to the recommendation that more dams be built.

A site for a second storage dam, Cordeaux, to be built on the Cordeaux River, was selected by the Water Board in the latter part of the 1911 and a gauging weir was constructed. Preliminary plans and estimates were prepared and the foundations tested. Following this, further investigations were carried out by the Public Works Department.

Good rainfall occurred throughout the succeeding years (except for a dry period in 1915–1916) and, because of this and the intervention of World War I, construction on the Cordeaux Dam was not commenced until 1918. In November of that year a Special Board of Experts consisting of engineers from the Public Authorities was appointed by the Government to draw up recommendations for the amplification of the Sydney water supply. This body not only endorsed the construction of the Cordeaux Dam but recommended the construction of the Avon and Nepean Dams as well.

In 1921, three years after the Cordeaux Dam was commenced and five years before it was completed, the Public Works Department commenced work on a third and much higher dam at a site selected on the Avon River, a tributary of the upper Nepean. The Avon Dam was also designed and constructed by the Public Works engineers under the direction of the Chief Engineer for Water Supply and Sewerage, E.M. De Burgh. The resident engineer, during its construction, was Gerald Haskins.

As with the previous dams, Cataract and Cordeaux, Avon Dam was built using cyclopean masonry. This consisted of sandstone blocks, quarried from the site, which were fitted into an irregular pattern and packed with sandstone concrete. However, in this case the rock was quarried to make a deep cut through a ridge to a neighbouring creek to provide the spillway for the dam. Like its predecessors, Avon also had the upstream face of the dam sheathed with a layer of basaltic concrete that is 0.61 metres (2 ft) thick for watertightness and to resist wave and other erosion forces.

The concrete was all manufactured on the site in special metal-crushing, concrete mixing plants. These included Jacques roll-jaw crushers, pulverising mills and Mullimix drum-type batchmixers. From the mixers, the concrete was discharged into concrete skips especially designed to facilitate the distribution of the concrete on the dam wall. All the plant was electrically operated and the current obtained from the State Power Station at Port Kembla by transmission lines 19 miles (31 km) in length.

A road 9.7 kilometres (6 mi) long was constructed from Bargo railway station to transport all the materials. Other plant used on the site included two Lidgerwood cableways, three locomotive cranes and four stiff-leg type derrick cranes. All of these were designed and constructed in Australia.

The water storage area for the dam was cleared of all timber and brush except for stumps 3 feet (0.91 m) high. Any hardwood timber of commercial value was cut into sleepers, fencing posts and rails and used in the construction of the works railway to the Nepean Dam then under construction. An extensive area of coachwood timber (Ceratopetalum apetalum) was found in the storage basin. This was cut at a special sawmill erected at the Dam and a fleet of punts and launches transported the logs down the river to the mill. About 1 million superficial feet (3,540 m^{3}) of sawn and dressed timber was produced. It was used in the construction of buildings in the Nepean Dam township, for wall forms for both the Avon and Nepean Dams and the remainder was sold.

Accommodation for workmen was provided near the construction site in a single-storey barracks for single men. Land was placed at the disposal of the married men who were assisted in constructing temporary houses for themselves and their families.

Avon Dam was completed in 1927 and handed over to the Sydney Water Board on 20 January 1928. It was built at the cost of A£1,047,000.

The dam served the Sydney area until the completion of Warragamba Dam in 1960, after which, in 1963, its storage was reserved to meet the increased water supply needs of the Wollongong area. An electrical pumping station located in Flying Fox Creek, at the end of the stored water remote from the wall, pumps water over the Divide to Wollongong and Port Kembla.

In 1973, as part of a plan to interconnect the various water supply systems for Sydney, Wollongong and Sutherland, a tunnel was constructed between the Nepean Dam and the Avon Dam. This allows water to be transferred in either direction, as required.

== Description ==
The Avon Dam was the third and largest of the four dams constructed to develop the Upper Nepean catchment area, in order to meet Sydney's ever increasing demand for water. It was built using cyclopean masonry. This consisted of sandstone blocks, quarried from the site, which were fitted into an irregular pattern and packed with sandstone concrete. However, in this case the rock was quarried to make a deep cut through a ridge to a neighbouring creek to provide the spillway for the dam. Like its predecessors, Avon also had the upstream face of the dam sheathed with a layer of basaltic concrete for watertightness and to resist wave and other erosion forces.

The dam wall is curved in plan and has a spillway channel constructed as an open cut through a ridge between the reservoir and a watercourse, which discharges into the Avon River one-half mile (0.80 km) below the dam. Each end of the dam wall is flanked by massive Egyptian style pylons complete with decorative lotus columns. It is fitted with outlet valves on two levels. The upper level water draw-off consists of two 0.91-metre (3 ft) diameter pipes each fitted with needle valves 30 inches (76 cm) in diameter, situated 24 metres (80 ft) below full supply level. The lower draw-offs, which were used for passing the stream flow during construction work, consist of two 1.2-metre (4 ft) diameter pipes fitted with 36 inches (0.91 m) diameter needle valves at the level of the river bed.

The dam has a well-developed picnic area on its eastern side, approximately in the area formerly occupied by the construction village. This picnic area features landscaped gardens within retaining walls, large areas of lawn and modern amenities and shelter facilities. There is a large rivetted steel (possibly cast-iron) elevated water tank within the picnic area, carried on rivetted plate-web girders and cast steel (or iron) posts. There is only one early residential building remaining, believed to be the former Resident Engineers residence. It is a single-storey weatherboard building with terracotta tiled hipped roof which also has a breakfront gabled wing. It is simply detailed with carved timber brackets to a projecting rectangular window frame and roughcast render to the chimney. One other house dates from the 1960s and two from the 1970s/80s and are all single-storey brick cottages. The earlier cottage is of red brick and has terracotta tiles to a hipped and gabled roof. The two later cottages appear to have been built to the same design and feature concrete tiled, gable roofs and utilise large-dimension mottled bricks. The works office and the picnic area amenities buildings are single storey brick buildings, recent in origin, with either profiled steel skillion roofs or gable roofs clad in concrete tiles.

== Heritage listing ==
The Avon Dam was the third and the largest of the four water supply dams built as part of the development of the Upper Nepean Water Supply Scheme, one of the most important engineering works and items of public infrastructure in Australia, and is still the second largest of all the NSW water supply dams in terms of storage capacity. It was designed by the NSW Public Works Department under the direction of one of Australia's leading water supply engineers, E.M. De Burgh. The completion of the Avon Dam was a significant step in the continuing process of providing a reliable water supply for Sydney and surrounding areas as part of the Upper Nepean Scheme. Even by the international standards of the time, Avon was a high dam with a large impoundment of water and was a significant work of engineering in its day. It continues to play an important role as the major source of supply for the Wollongong, Port Kembla and surrounding towns and areas.

The roadway was constructed prior to the Dam between 1918 and 1921, and was used to transport all materials, stores and labour and significantly provided the sole route of transportation, other dam sites relying on a combination of road, tram or ropeway, and continues to be used as the main access to the present time.

Avon Dam was listed on the New South Wales State Heritage Register on 18 November 1999 having satisfied the following criteria.

- "The place is important in demonstrating the course, or pattern, of cultural or natural history in New South Wales."
- "The place has a strong or special association with a person, or group of persons, of importance of cultural or natural history of New South Wales's history."
- "The place is important in demonstrating aesthetic characteristics and/or a high degree of creative or technical achievement in New South Wales."
- "The place has a strong or special association with a particular community or cultural group in New South Wales for social, cultural or spiritual reasons."
- "The place has potential to yield information that will contribute to an understanding of the cultural or natural history of New South Wales."
- "The place possesses uncommon, rare or endangered aspects of the cultural or natural history of New South Wales."
- "The place is important in demonstrating the principal characteristics of a class of cultural or natural places/environments in New South Wales."

== See also ==
- List of reservoirs and dams in New South Wales
- Sydney Water
- Shoalhaven Scheme
- Upper Canal System
- Gerald Haskins
