= Cordeaux =

Cordeaux may refer to:

== Settlements ==
- Cordeaux, New South Wales, a suburb of Wollongong, Australia
- Cordeaux Heights, a suburb of Wollongong, Australia

== Places ==
- Cordeaux Academy, Louth, Lincolnshire, England
- Cordeaux Dam, Wollongong, Australia
- Cordeaux River, New South Wales, Australia
- Mount Cordeaux, Brisbane, Australia

== People ==
- Harry Cordeaux (1870–1943), British Indian Army officer and colonial administrator
- Jeremy Cordeaux (born 1945), Australian radio and television presenter
- John Cordeaux (1902–1982), British MP for Nottingham Central 1955–1964
- John Cordeaux (ornithologist) (1831–1899), English ornithologist

== See also ==
- Bordeaux (disambiguation)
- Cordeauxia, a plant in the family Fabaceae
- Fabien Cordeau (1923–2007), Canadian politician
