= Cordeaux Dam =

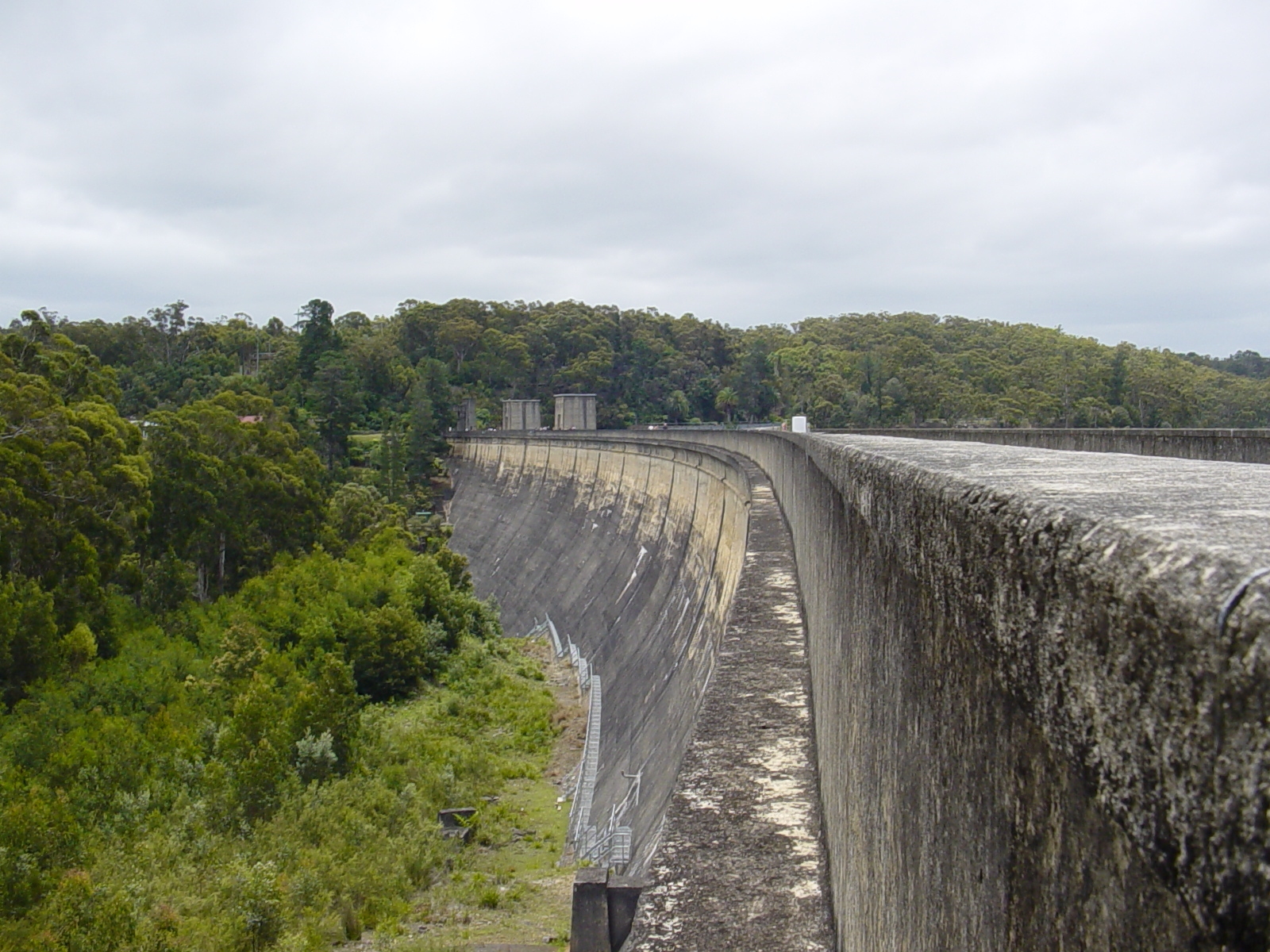
- The curved dam wall

- Location of the dam in New South Wales
- Country: Australia
- Location: Southern Highlands, New South Wales
- Coordinates: 34°20′07″S 150°45′00″E
- Purpose: Water supply
- Status: Operational
- Construction began: 1918
- Opening date: 1926
- Construction cost: A£945,000
- Designed by: Ernest Macartney de Burgh
- Operator: Water NSW

Dam and spillways
- Type of dam: Gravity dam
- Impounds: Cordeaux River
- Height (foundation): 58.2 m (191 ft)
- Length: 709 m (2,326 ft)
- Elevation at crest: 303.6 m (996 ft) AHD
- Width (crest): 5 m (16 ft)
- Width (base): 45.7 m (150 ft)

Reservoir
- Creates: Cordeaux Reservoir
- Total capacity: 93,716 ML (75,977 acre⋅ft)
- Surface area: 782 ha (1,930 acres)
- Maximum water depth: 51.8 m (170 ft)

New South Wales Heritage Register
- Official name: Cordeaux Dam
- Type: State heritage (built)
- Criteria: a., b., c., d., e., f., g.
- Designated: 18 November 1999
- Reference no.: 1360
- Type: Water Supply Reservoir/ Dam
- Category: Utilities – Water
- Builders: Department of Public Works

The Cordeaux Dam is a gravity dam across the Cordeaux River, located in Cordeaux, in the Southern Highlands of New South Wales, Australia. Completed in 1926 under the supervision of Ernest Macartney de Burgh, the resultant reservoir was established to supply potable water to the Macarthur and Illawarra regions, the Wollondilly Shire, and metropolitan Sydney.

It is one of four dams and weirs in the catchment of the Upper Nepean Scheme, owned by Water NSW, a NSW Government agency.

The dam was added to the New South Wales State Heritage Register in 1999.

== Structural details ==
The heritage-listed gravity dam is s 58 metres (191 ft) high and 404 metres (1,327 ft) long. Construction began in 1918 and was completed in 1926 at a cost of A£945,000. When full, the resultant reservoir has capacity of 93,640 megalitres (75,920 acre⋅ft). The dam wall consists of large sandstone blocks, quarried onsite and cemented together, faced with a combination of bluestone and sandstone concrete. The dam featured a number of improvements in design and construction on the earlier-completed Cataract Dam. These included contraction joints between units of construction placed at intervals of 27 metres (90 ft); inspection galleries at upper and lower levels, together with piping for registering any ground water pressure. The blue metal used in the construction of the dam was supplied from the Government Quarries at Kiama and brought by rail to Douglas Park. From here it was conveyed by aerial ropeway across the Nepean Gorge to an interchange on the eastern side where the material was transferred to a 2 ft (610 mm) gauge steam tramway to a point adjacent to the dam site. The spillway has an unlined side on the left abutment.

== History ==
The Upper Nepean Scheme was commenced in 1880 after it was realised that the Botany Swamps scheme was insufficient to meet Sydney's water supply needs. The Nepean project consisted of the construction of a weir across the Nepean River to divert of the rivers Cataract, Cordeaux, Avon and Nepean, to the Prospect Reservoir.

The design and construction of Cordeaux Dam was undertaken by the Water Supply and Sewerage Branch and Harbour and Rivers Branch of the New South Wales Public Works Department. The construction of the dam necessitated the knowledge and experience of a number of engineers employed in the branches at the time including Cecil Darley (NSW Inspecting Engineer in London), Leslie Wade (Principal Engineer, Water Supply and Sewerage Branch), Henry Dare and Ernest M. de Burgh (Supervising Engineers). The successful completion of the dam and its continuation of use as a water supply dam are a lasting testament to the professional capabilities of the late Victorian/Edwardian era generation of engineers of the Public Works Department.

== Description ==
Cordeaux Dam is a cyclopean masonry dam composed of sandstone blocks, weighing from two to four and a half tons, quarried at the site and bedded in a cement mortar. The roughly rectangular blocks were bedded on and packed with sandstone concrete, with cement mortar only being used where considered necessary. The concrete is made with crushed Hawkesbury sandstone. Concrete made of hard basaltic stone (instead of the softer sandstone) is used for the upstream face, 1 metre (2 ft) thick, which merges into sandstone concrete 2 metres (6 ft) thick at lower levels and 1 metre (4 ft) thick at higher levels. The dam wall is curved in plan and has a bywash spillway as a continuation of its southern end. Each end of the dam wall is flanked by massive Egyptian style pylons complete with decorative lotus columns. These pylons differ from those at Avon Dam by having heavy fluting to the lotus columns. Two valve houses along the dam wall are square, flat-roofed concrete buildings with strong Egyptian stylisation in the tapered wall profiles, circular beading to corners and overhanging eaves. These contain discharge outlets, with the Upper Outlet consisting of two 122-centimetre (48 in) pipes with FCD valves and Ring Faulkner gate valves. The two lower valve houses at the downstream foot of the dam wall are very similar in appearance and which contain 91-centimetre (36 in) discharge pipes with Ring Faulkner gate valves and scour valves as outlets.

The dam featured a number of improvements in design and construction on the earlier-completed Cataract Dam. These included contraction joints between units of construction placed at intervals of 27 metres (90 ft); inspection galleries at upper and lower levels, together with piping for registering any ground water pressure.

The Cordeaux Dam storage is discharged to the Cordeaux River downstream, flowing to Pheasants Nest Weir on the Nepean River where it is diverted through a tunnel 7.2-kilometre (4.5 mi) long to the Cataract River at Broughton's Pass. From here it is diverted by another weir to the Cataract Tunnel, three-point-two-kilometre (two-mile) long, emerging into the Upper Canal by which it is conveyed to Prospect Reservoir.

There are three cottages associated with the Dam, two of brick and one of weatherboard. The brick cottages are both very similar single-storey brick bungalows with terracotta-tiled hipped-gable roofs, dating from the 1960s. The weatherboard cottage appears to date from the construction of the Dam and is reputed to have been the Resident Engineers residence. It is a single-storey, weatherboard clad building on sandstone piers with a hipped and gabled roof clad in corrugated-iron. The building features little decoration but has a front verandah which wraps around the building for half the length of the sides. This has chamfered square timber posts, a slatted timber balustrade and sandstone steps with sandstone masonry balustrades.

The Cordeaux Dam site is a popular tourist attraction. The public area is maintained with picnic grounds, landscaped gardens, shelter sheds and pathways. The grounds associated with the main public areas of the dam contain many intact landscape elements from the c. 1930s (and possibly late 1920s). Remnant landscape features include stone retaining walls; gardens (layout and plantings); a robust and imaginative cement-sculpted grotto/picnic shelter sited between a large Monterey pine and a very large Eucalypt; a broad stone flagged surface drain in the upper picnic area; a lower picnic area with a series of grassed terraces accessible by a narrow crazy-paved path in stone; and a Monterey pine (Pinus radiata) avenue to the lower dam road with gums beyond. The upper park area is characterised by mature pines while an interwar cottage and nearby propagating structure include older plantings of Magnolia grandiflora and Lagerstroemia indica which are probably contemporary with the cottage. A distinctive feature of the site is stands of autochthonous Cypress Pine (Callitris sp.).

The Conservation Management Plan outlines the key elements and their individual significance assessments.

=== Condition ===
As at 21 January 2009, the condition of the dam was good. The fabric of Cordeaux Dam retains a high level of integrity.

=== Modifications and dates ===
- 1960's - Two brick cottages were built, probably as replacements for earlier weatherboard cottages.
- 1988 - Upgraded with a system of drains in the wall and foundations.

=== Further information ===
Cordeaux Dam is located in three Council areas: Wollondilly, Wingecarribee and Wollongong.

== Heritage listing ==
As at 21 January 2009, Cordeaux Dam was the second of the four water supply dams built as part of the development of the Upper Nepean Water Supply Scheme, one of the most important engineering works and items of public infrastructure in Australia, and still has the longest wall of all the NSW water supply dams. It was designed by the NSW Public Works Department under the direction of one of Australia's leading water supply engineers, E.M. De Burgh. The completion of the Cordeaux Dam was a significant step in the continuing process of providing a reliable water supply for Sydney and surrounding areas as part of the Upper Nepean Scheme. Even by the international standards of the time, Cordeaux was a large dam and was a significant work of engineering in its day. It continues to play an important role as a major source of supply for the Sydney region.

Cordeaux Dam is a handsome, well proportioned structure with strong Egyptian style architectural character which complements the monumental nature of the structure and its attractive natural surroundings. Cordeaux Dam includes a range of ancillary structures which form components of the overall site, including residential cottages of various ages for operational staff, one of which appears to date from the construction of the dam. This latter is associated with the Residential Engineer for construction and operation of the dam and is a fine example of a late Federation Bungalow style building. The other residences are representative of their age and type.

The public picnic grounds and gardens attached to the Cordeaux Dam contain a cultural landscape resource - including remnants of its interwar period plantings, layout and detailing, and extensive areas of bushland. There is evidence in the landscape design, particularly in the use of palms and tree ferns and battered stonework retaining walls, of an intention to continue the Egyptian Revival references apparent in the design of the main dam structures.

Cordeaux Dam was listed on the New South Wales State Heritage Register on 18 November 1999 having satisfied the following criteria.

The place is important in demonstrating the course, or pattern, of cultural or natural history in New South Wales.

Cordeaux Dam is constructed within the Upper Nepean catchment area which was developed with the completion of the Cataract and Nepean tunnels in 1888, as the fourth source of water supply for Sydney. The potential of the Upper Nepean Catchment Area to supply water was fully developed through the construction of four major dams between 1903 and 1936. Cordeaux Dam is the second of these dams to have been completed. The Upper Nepean Catchment Area continues to supply the regions of Sydney and Illawarra.

Cordeaux Dam was the fourth of the major water supply dams constructed in NSW during the first half of the twentieth century. The design and technologies used in the construction of the dam are representative of the methods developed by the Public Works Department of NSW at the time.

In conjunction with the completion of Avon Dam in 1927, the impounded water of the Cordeaux catchment area provided one of the major sources of water for domestic and industrial consumption in metropolitan Sydney, the largest city in New South Wales. In providing water for metropolitan Sydney during this era the dam, in ensuring security of supply, contributed to the extensive residential, commercial and industrial development of Sydney during the 1920s and 1930s.

The place has a strong or special association with a person, or group of persons, of importance of cultural or natural history of New South Wales's history.

The design and construction of Cordeaux Dam was undertaken by the Water Supply and Sewerage Branch of the NSW Public Works Department. The construction of the dam drew upon the knowledge and experience of a number of engineers employed in the Branch at the time, including Ernest M. de Burgh (Chief Engineer). The successful completion of the dam and its continuation of use as a water supply dam are a lasting testament to the professional capabilities of the Federation/Inner War era generation of engineers of the Public Works Department.

The tract of Eucalyptus bordering the encircling road of the upper picnic area was planted out by Board members of the former Water Board in 1928. The trees have particular memorial associations with past identities of the Board.

The place is important in demonstrating aesthetic characteristics and/or a high degree of creative or technical achievement in New South Wales.

The wall of Cordeaux Dam is an engineering work imbued with a sense of aesthetic values expressed through the long curved wall set within the valley of the Cordeaux River.

The design and finishes of the crest houses, entry pylons and lower valve houses in the Inter Egyptian style were undertaken by the Government Architect's branch of the Public Works Department at the time headed by George McCrae. The architectural detailing evokes a romanticised version of the Ancient Near East at a time when many Australians had first hand experience of the area through military service, and through knowledge of archeological finds reported in the popular press.

The dam is set within the valley of the Cordeaux River. Upstream of the dam wall this setting is characterised by the broad expanse of the pool of water bordered by the crests of the valley sides. Downstream of the dam wall the setting is characterised by the steeper inclines that graduate into the gorge created by the river's flow over time. Collectively this topography at times of high water imparts a picturesque scene when viewed from selective vantage points above and on the dam wall.

The former resident officer's cottage erected at the time of the dam's construction to house the resident engineer, is an excellent and intact example of the high standard of accommodation provided for Public Works Department senior staff.

The place has a strong or special association with a particular community or cultural group in New South Wales for social, cultural or spiritual reasons.

The dam and grounds are recognised by the National Trust of Australia (NSW) as being a place which is part of the cultural environment of Australia, which has aesthetic, historical, architectural, archaeological, scientific and social significance for future generations, as well as for the present community of NSW.

The dam and grounds are recognised by the Heritage Council of NSW as a place which is of significance to NSW in relation to its historical, scientific, cultural, social, archaeological, natural and aesthetic values.

The place has potential to yield information that will contribute to an understanding of the cultural or natural history of New South Wales.

The cyclopean masonry of the dam is an excellent early example of gravity dam construction in the Inter War era. It incorporates inspection galleries, contraction joints, and foundation drainage systems which collectively demonstrate the advanced state of this technology at the time.

Terraces and platforms adjoining the dam abutments demarcate the location of plant and equipment used in the construction of the dam, in particular the location of the cableway head towers, and concrete batching plant. The plateau of the upper picnic area was the site of the original construction township and retains a road formation, culverts and drainage lines and tennis court from that era.

The grounds of the dam retain numerous tree plantings undertaken for the opening of the dam in 1927. Collectively the diversity of these trees present a good record of past horticultural practices.

The place possesses uncommon, rare or endangered aspects of the cultural or natural history of New South Wales.

The wall of the Cordeaux Dam is the longest of all the dams constructed in the Upper Nepean Catchment Area. Cordeaux Dam is one of three dams in NSW which incorporate extensive inter War Egyptian architectural detailing. Cordeaux Dam is one of two extant dams in NSW which incorporate pedestrian and vehicular entry pavilions to the crest wall.

The crest and valve houses and inlet works retain original ironwork and machinery such as roller gates, penstocks and penstock opening system which represent a substantial repository of water supply delivery technology for the era in NSW.

The dam incorporates the first instance of multiple level water discharges and valve houses, and emergency roller gates in NSW. The ensemble of plant buildings either associated with the construction or completion of the dam, such as weatherboard machine shed (adapted to double garage) and the corrugated iron blacksmiths, are unique in situ examples within the broader context of the four Metropolitan Dams.

The dam incorporates cyclopean masonry which is a construction technique unique to the Metropolitan Dams in Australia. The dam incorporates the first instance of internal inspection galleries and connecting pipework and V notch weirs in a dam in NSW.

The place is important in demonstrating the principal characteristics of a class of cultural or natural places/environments in New South Wales.

Cordeaux Dam is representative of a type of dam (cyclopean masonry gravity dam) constructed in NSW by the Department of Public Works during the first half of the twentieth century. Key representative attributes of the dam design and construction include the use of cyclopean masonry bedded in sandstone concrete, use of blue metal concrete in facing the upstream face, the use of sandstone concrete in facing the downstream wall, use of a spillway that is an extension of the gravity wall, upper and lower valve/crest houses attractively designed and finished to a high standard, the use of an array of upstream intakes to regulate the quality of water supply, the internal inspection galleries, the foundation grouting system, the contraction joints, and the internal drainage system.

The upgrading of the valves within the dam wall and ancillary monitoring and operating equipment is representative of modern-day safe operating practice.

The construction technologies used at Cordeaux Dam are representative of dams constructed in NSW through the first half of the twentieth century. Key representative attributes include the use of cableways, the building of temporary townships to house labourers and tradesman, building of semi-permanent cottages to house salaried staff, the construction of terrace platforms for plant and machinery, mechanisation of concrete production, the construction of a purpose built road of access and tramway to transport men, supplies and materials from the nearest railhead to the construction site, the building of permanent infrastructure such as water supply for plant, men and horses and the use of electricity to power plant and equipment.

The rehabilitation of tracts of land scarred in the construction processes employed at Cordeaux Dam through beautification works is representative of practices undertaken at other dams throughout NSW. Key representative attributes of this practice include utilising the former township as a picnic area, utilising the former terraced construction areas as picnic areas and lookouts, and utilising the former construction roads and tramway for vehicular access to the dam wall.

The practice of ongoing maintenance of the wall after completion through surveillance provided by resident staff and workshop facilities is representative of procedures undertaken at other dams in NSW.

The provision of public amenity at the dam site is representative of the use of large water supply and irrigation dams in NSW as places for recreation by the greater community.

== See also ==
- List of reservoirs and dams in New South Wales
- Sydney Water
- Shoalhaven Scheme
- Upper Canal System
