= Glennies Creek Bridge =

- Coordinates: 32°27′00″S 151°08′58″E
- Carries: Rixs Creek-Falbrook Road
- Crosses: Glennies Creek
- Locale: Middle Falbrook, New South Wales, Australia
- Owner: Transport for NSW

Characteristics
- Design: Truss bridge
- Material: Timber
- Pier construction: Concrete
- Total length: 75.4 metres (247 ft)
- Width: 4.6 metres (15 ft)
- Longest span: 28.1 metres (92 ft)
- No. of spans: 2
- No. of lanes: 1

History
- Engineering design by: Ernest de Burgh
- Constructed by: William Murphy & James Taylor
- Construction start: 1902
- Construction end: 1903
- Construction cost: A£4,100

New South Wales Heritage Register
- Official name: Middle Falbrook Bridge over Glennies Creek
- Type: State heritage (built)
- Designated: 20 June 2000
- Reference no.: 1474
- Type: Road Bridge
- Category: Transport - Land
- Builders: Murphy & Taylor, Morpeth

The Glennies Creek Bridge is a heritage-listed road bridge that carries the Rixs Creek-Falbrook Road across the Glennies Creek, located at Middle Falbrook, New South Wales, Australia. The bridge was designed by Ernest de Burgh and built in 1902-03 by William Murphy and James Taylor. The property is owned by Transport for NSW. The bridge was added to the New South Wales State Heritage Register on 20 June 2000.

== History ==
=== Timber truss bridges ===
Timber truss road bridges have played a significant role in the expansion and improvement of the NSW road network. Prior to the bridges being built, river crossings were often dangerous in times of rain, which caused bulk freight movement to be prohibitively expensive for most agricultural and mining produce. Only the high priced wool clip of the time was able to carry the costs and inconvenience imposed by the generally inadequate river crossings that often existed prior to the trusses construction.

Timber truss bridges were preferred by the Public Works Department from the mid-19th to the early 20th century because they were relatively cheap to construct, and used mostly local materials. The financially troubled governments of the day applied pressure to the Public Works Department to produce as much road and bridge work for as little cost as possible, using local materials. This condition effectively prohibited the use of iron and steel, as these, prior to the construction of the steel works at Newcastle in the early 20th century, had to be imported from England.

Ernest de Burgh, the designer of de Burgh truss and other bridges, was a leading engineer with the Public Works Department, and a prominent figure in early 20th century NSW.

Timber truss bridges, and timber bridges generally were so common that New South Wales was known to travellers as the "timber bridge state".

=== Glennies Creek Bridge ===
The bridge was built in 1902-03 at a cost of A£4,100.

== Description ==
The bridge over Glennies Creek is a de Burgh-type timber truss road bridge. It has two timber truss spans, each of 28.1 metres (92 ft). There are single timber approach spans at each end giving the bridge an overall length of 75.4 metres (247 ft). The bridge super structure is supported by twin Monier concrete cylinders with metal bracing. The bridge provides a single lane carriage way with a minimum width of 4.6 metres (15 ft). A timber post-and-rail guard rail extends the full length of the bridge.

== Heritage listing ==
The Middle Falbrook bridge is a de Burgh timber truss road bridge. As a timber truss road bridge, it has many associational links with important historical events, trends, and people, including the expansion of the road network and economic activity throughout NSW, and Ernest de Burgh, the designer of this type of truss.

de Burgh trusses were fourth in the five stage design evolution of NSW timber truss road bridges. Designed by Public Works' engineer Ernest M. de Burgh, the de Burgh truss is an adaptation of the American Pratt truss design. The de Burgh truss is the first to use significant amounts of steel and iron, and did so in spite of its high cost and the government's historical preference for timber.

de Burgh trusses were significant technical improvements over their predecessors. The Middle Falbrook bridge has piers made from Monier pipes filled with concrete, which is representative of the emerging concrete technology in bridge construction. Middle Falbrook Bridge is located in the Hunter region, which has 15 historic bridges each constructed before 1905, and it gains heritage significance from its proximity to the high concentration of other historic bridges in the area.

In 1998 there were ten surviving de Burgh trusses in NSW of the twenty built, and 82 timber truss road bridges survive from the over 400 built.

The Middle Falbrook bridge is a representative example of de Burgh timber truss road bridges, and is assessed as being State significant, primarily on the basis of its technical and historical significance.

Middle Falbrook Bridge over Glennies Creek was listed on the New South Wales State Heritage Register on 20 June 2000 having satisfied the following criteria.

- The place is important in demonstrating the course, or pattern, of cultural or natural history in New South Wales. Through the bridge's association with the expansion of the NSW road network, its ability to demonstrate historically important concepts such as the gradual acceptance of NSW people of American design ideas, and its association with Ernest de Burgh, it has historical significance.
- The place is important in demonstrating aesthetic characteristics and/or a high degree of creative or technical achievement in New South Wales. The bridge exhibits the technical excellence of its design, as all of the structural detail is clearly visible. In the context of its landscape it is visually attractive. As such, the bridge has a small amount of aesthetic significance.
- The place has a strong or special association with a particular community or cultural group in New South Wales for social, cultural or spiritual reasons. Timber truss bridges are prominent to road travellers, and NSW has in the past been referred to as the "timber truss bridge state". Through this, the complete set of bridges gain some social significance, as they could be said to be held in reasonable esteem by many travellers in NSW.
- The place possesses uncommon, rare or endangered aspects of the cultural or natural history of New South Wales. Rare - only de Burgh truss bridge with Monier concrete pipe piers.
- The place is important in demonstrating the principal characteristics of a class of cultural or natural places/environments in New South Wales. Representative of de Burgh truss bridges.

== See also ==
- List of bridges in Australia
- Hunter Region
