= Upper Nepean Scheme =

Series of dams and weirs in New South Wales, Australia

Coordinates: 34°13′40″S 150°44′39″E

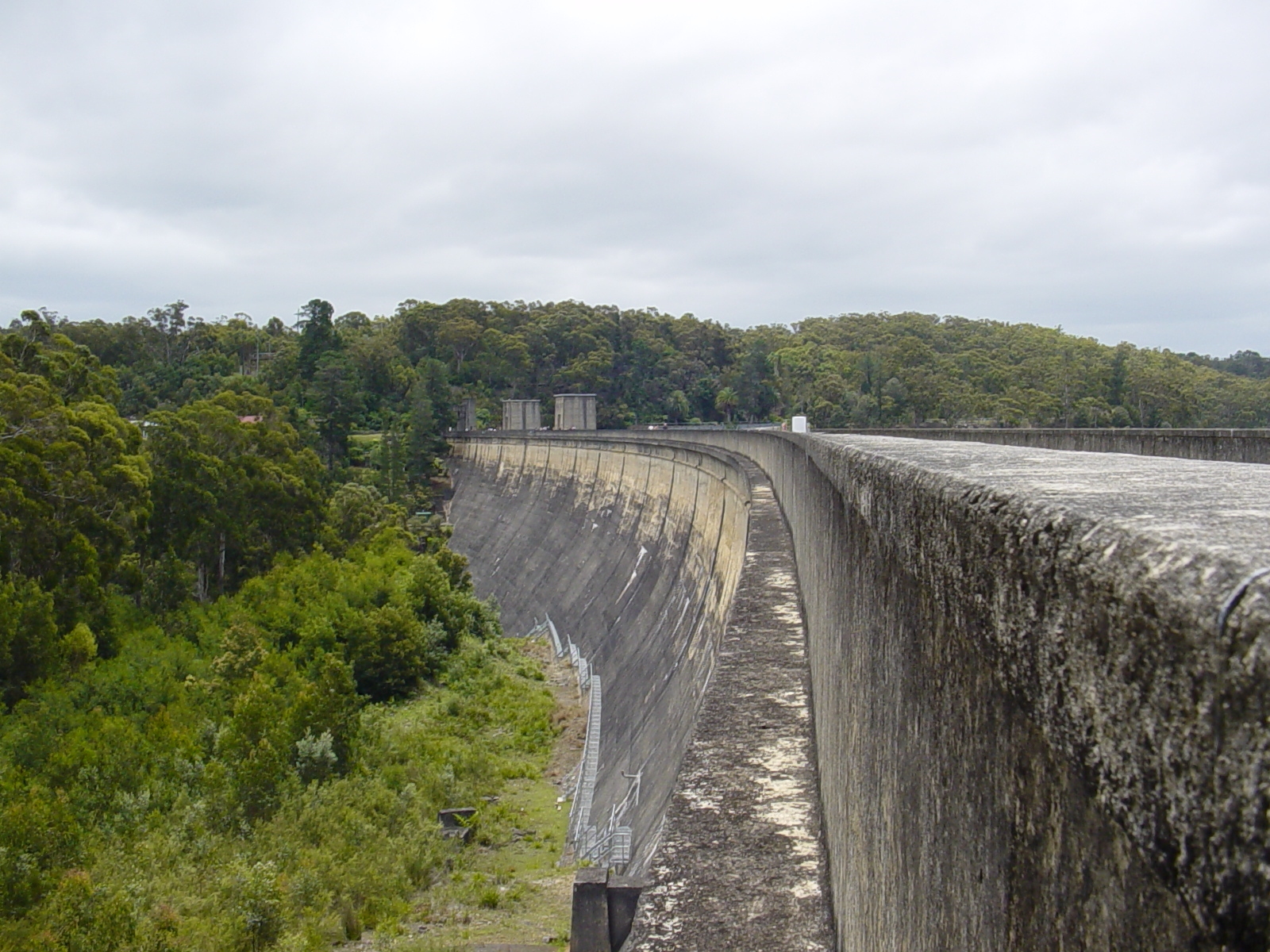
Wall of the Cordeaux Dam, one of the dams in the Upper Nepean Scheme

The Upper Nepean Scheme is a series of dams and weirs in the catchments of the Cataract, Cordeaux, Avon and Nepean rivers of New South Wales, Australia. The scheme includes four dams and two weirs, and a gravity-fed canal system that feeds into a large storage reservoir to provide water to the Macarthur and Illawarra regions, the Wollondilly Shire, and metropolitan Sydney. The four dams and associated infrastructure are individually listed on the New South Wales State Heritage Register.

== History ==
By 1867, Sydney was outgrowing the water supply available from Botany Swamps and the Governor (Sir John Young) appointed a Commission to recommend a future water supply. In 1869, the Commission recommended the Upper Nepean Scheme. This comprised weirs on the Cataract and Nepean rivers, a storage reservoir at Prospect and 101.79 kilometres (63.25 mi) of pipelines, tunnels, canals and aqueducts to bring water from the 900 square kilometres (347 sq mi) catchment area to Sydney. Work on the Scheme began in 1880 and was completed in 1888. The Scheme was a significant feat of engineering at the time of construction.

In June 1885 Sydney was in the grip of a severe drought and the Upper Nepean Scheme was incomplete. The Government accepted an offer from Hudson Brothers to bridge the gaps and deliver 14 megalitres; 3.6 million US gallons (3×10^{6} imp gal) of water per day into Botany Swamps. Duplicating the entire length of the half built permanent scheme this became known as Hudsons' Temporary Scheme and was turned into the swamps on 30 January 1886. This emergency work was dismantled as the main scheme was completed.

As originally built, the Upper Nepean Scheme was capable of supporting an estimated population of 540,000. By 1902, Sydney had a population of 523,000 and was again in the grip of a severe drought. A Royal Commission appointed to report on Sydney's water supply recommended a dam on the Cataract River and construction commenced in the same year. Dams were subsequently built on each of the Cordeaux, Avon and Nepean rivers, with the last being completed in 1935. Each dam includes a public picnic area. In total, the four dams hold 483,600 ML (1.064×10^{11} imp gal; 1.278×10^{11} US gal) and can safely provide 353 ML (78×10^{6} imp gal; 93×10^{6} US gal) per day.

The Scheme is now managed by the Sydney Catchment Authority.

Further supplementary water supply is provided by a feed from the Shoalhaven Scheme through various pumps, pipes, cuts and diversions.

== Associated dams ==
=== Cataract Dam ===
The Cataract Dam is a heritage-listed gravity dam with an unlined side spillway extending from the left abutment. It is 56 metres (183 ft) tall, 247 metres (811 ft) long and holds 97,190 ML (2.138×10^{10} imp gal; 2.567×10^{10} US gal) of water. Cataract Dam was the first dam built in the Upper Nepean Scheme, it was also first dam in Australia to use pre-cast moulded concrete blocks for the upstream face of the dam. The core of the dam consists of large 2-to-4.5-long-ton (2.03 to 4.57 t; 2.24-to-5.04-short-ton) sandstone blocks, quarried onsite and cemented together. The downstream face is of mass poured basalt concrete, with a basalt facing. A readily accessible source of suitable rock was located some distance away at Sherbrooke, also known as Ferndale, situated near the top of Bulli Pass. To transport the basalt from the quarry to the dam construction site, a 2 ft (610 mm) gauge steam tramway, 8.8 km (5.5 mi) long, was constructed. Dam construction began in 1902 and was completed in 1907, and the spillway was widened in 1915. Ernest Macartney de Burgh was the supervising engineer for the project from 1904. Poet Banjo Paterson wrote a satirical ballad "The Dam that Keele Built" about the politics behind the construction of Cataract Dam.

=== Cordeaux Dam ===
The Cordeaux Dam is a heritage-listed arch dam across the Cordeaux River with an unlined side spillway on the left abutment. It is 58 metres (191 ft) high, 404 metres (1,327 ft) long and creates a reservoir which holds 93,640 ML (2.060×10^{10} imp gal; 2.474×10^{10} US gal). Construction began in 1918 and was completed in 1926 at a cost of A£945,000. The wall consists of large sandstone blocks, quarried onsite and cemented together, faced with a combination of bluestone and sandstone concrete. The dam featured a number of improvements in design and construction on the earlier-completed Cataract Dam. These included contraction joints between units of construction placed at intervals of 27 metres (90 ft); inspection galleries at upper and lower levels, together with piping for registering any ground water pressure. The blue metal used in the construction of the dam was supplied from the Government Quarries at Kiama and brought by rail to Douglas Park. From here it was conveyed by aerial ropeway across the Nepean Gorge to an interchange on the eastern side where the material was transferred to a 2 ft (610 mm) gauge steam tramway to a point adjacent to the dam site.

=== Avon Dam ===
The Avon Dam is a heritage-listed arch dam across the Avon River; it is 72 metres (237 ft) tall, 223 metres (732 ft) long and its reservoir holds 146,700 ML (3.23×10^{10} imp gal; 3.88×10^{10} US gal). It has the largest capacity of all the dams in the Scheme. Construction of the heritage-listed dam wall began in 1921 and was completed in 1927 at a cost of A£1,047,000. The dam construction and materials are the same as Cordeaux. All materials for construction were transported from Bargo railway station on a specially built road, all the other dams in the scheme used rail transport. There were some light tramways constructed at the dam site, however it would appear that no locomotives were employed; skips and other items being moved by winch, horse or manpower.

=== Nepean Dam ===
The Nepean Dam is a heritage-listed arch dam across the Nepean River; it is 82 metres (269 ft) tall and 216 metres (709 ft) long. Construction on the Dam began in 1926, construction was delayed for two years during the Depression, it was finally completed in 1935. The capacity is listed variously as 67,730 to 81,400 ML (1.490×10^{10} to 1.791×10^{10} imp gal; 1.789×10^{10} to 2.150×10^{10} US gal). The Nepean Reservoir has a small storage capacity in relation to its large catchment area of 319 square kilometres (123 sq mi). While its capacity is much the same as that of Cataract and Cordeaux Reservoirs, its catchment basin is two and a half times as extensive as Cataract and three and a half times as extensive as Cordeaux. The Nepean Reservoir therefore fills more rapidly and, under normal conditions, is drawn upon more freely than the other reservoirs. The dam is located at an elevation of 325 metres (1,066 ft) above sea level and the construction cost was A£2,062,000.

Railway sidings were established on the Main Southern railway line at a point between Bargo and Yerrinbool. Transport to the dam site was again by light railway, on this occasion of standard gauge. This avoided transhipment from the Government vehicles bringing materials from large commercial quarries, effectively making the line an extended privately owned siding. The line was 4 km (2.5 mi) long through gentle countryside. Trains were worked by a variety of locomotives, including a former Sydney Steam Tram Motor. Additionally, there was a system of narrow (610 mm / 2 ft) gauge lines in use at the dam construction site.

Additional work was carried out on the spillway between 1943 and 1947 to prevent scouring of the dam foundations.

== Gallery ==
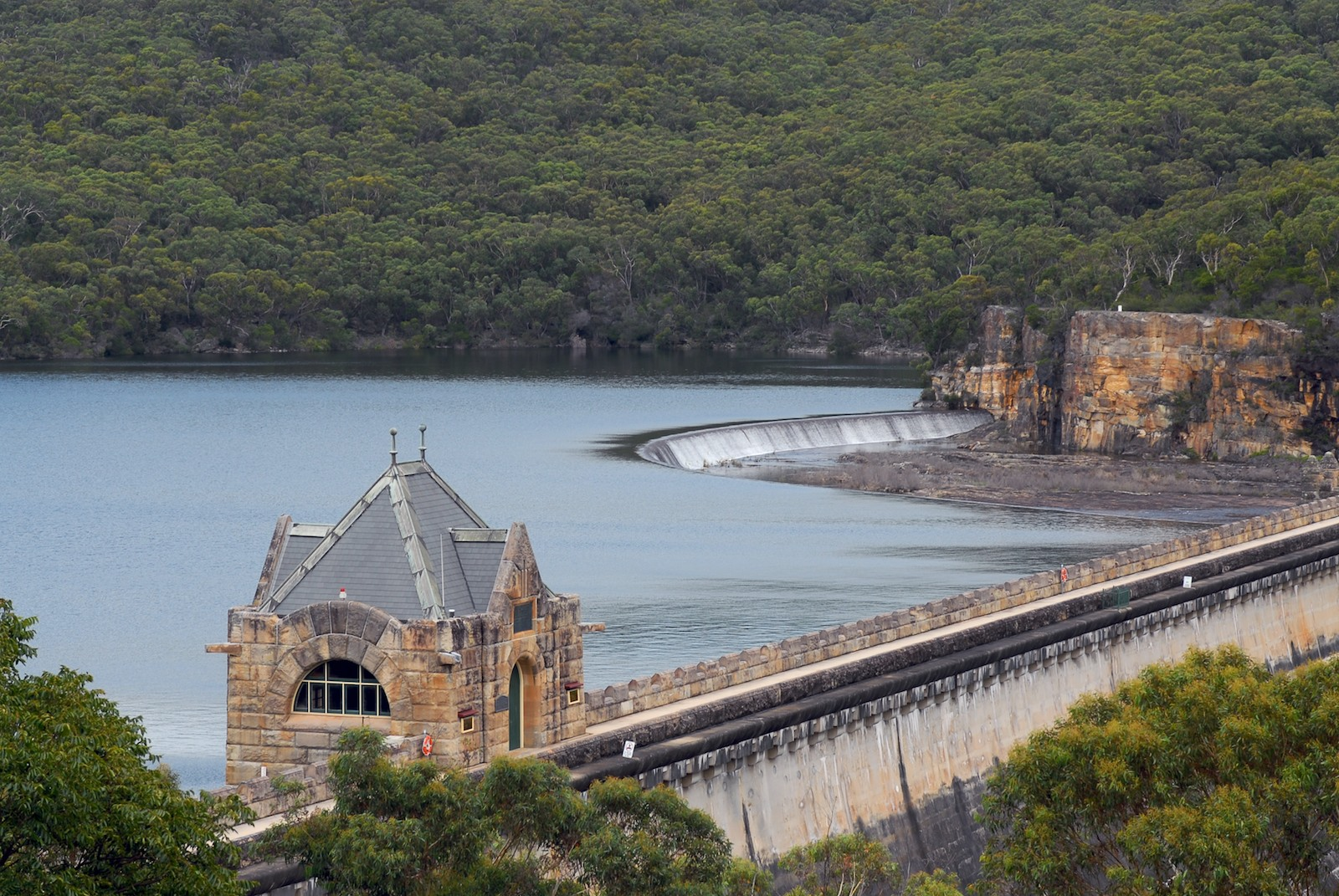
Cataract reservoir at full capacity, discharging through spillway

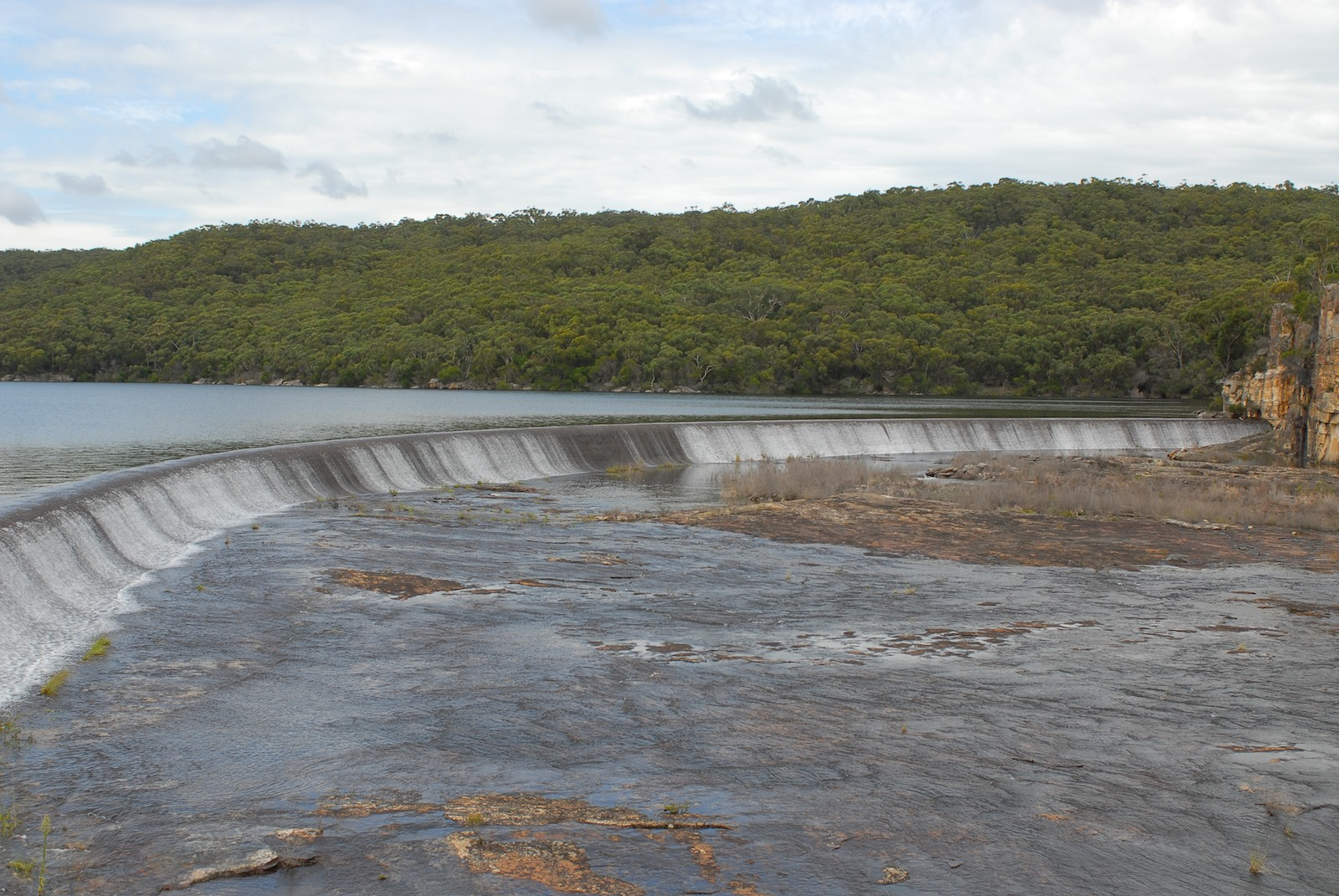
Detail of Cataract Dam spillway

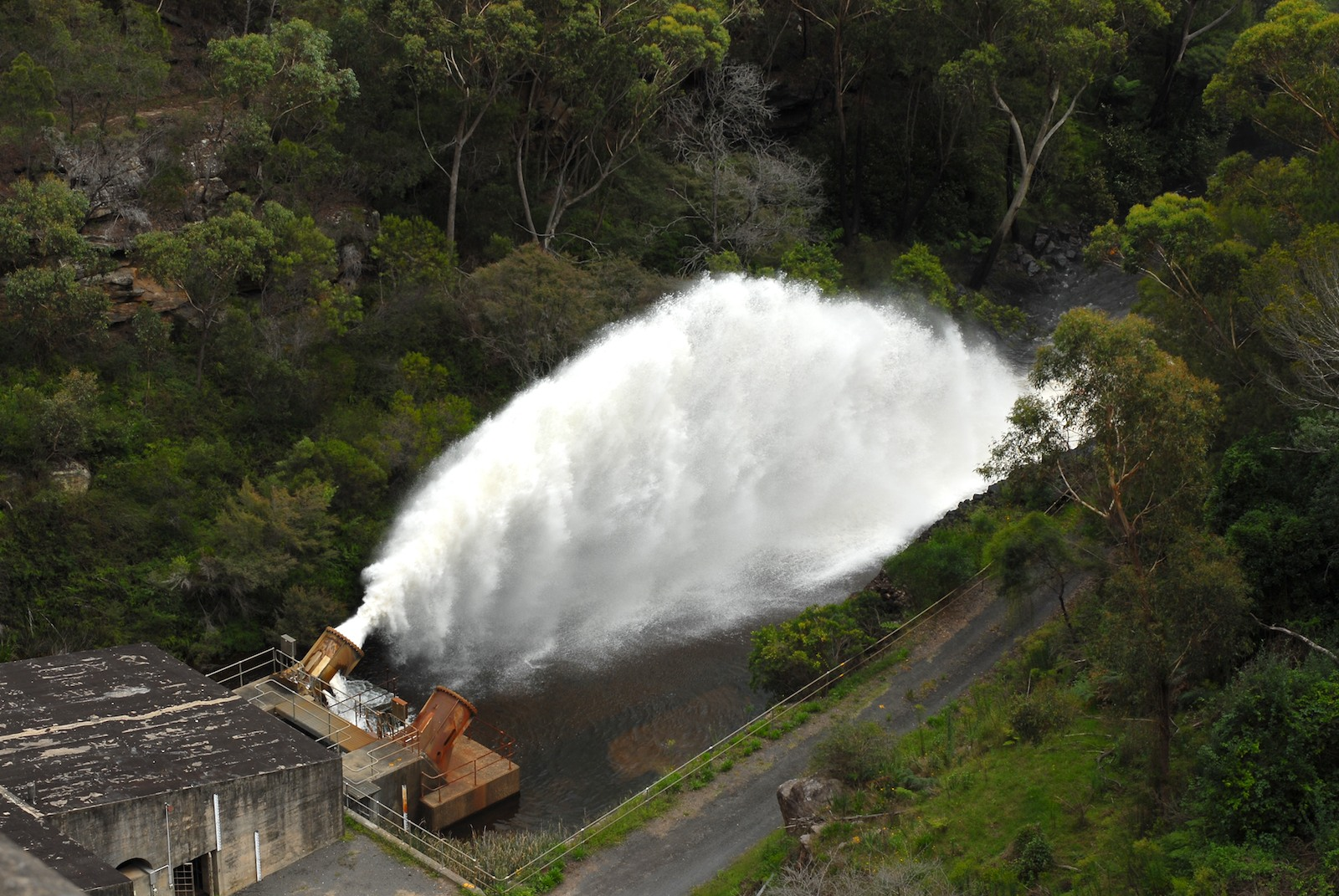
Outlet works at Cataract Dam

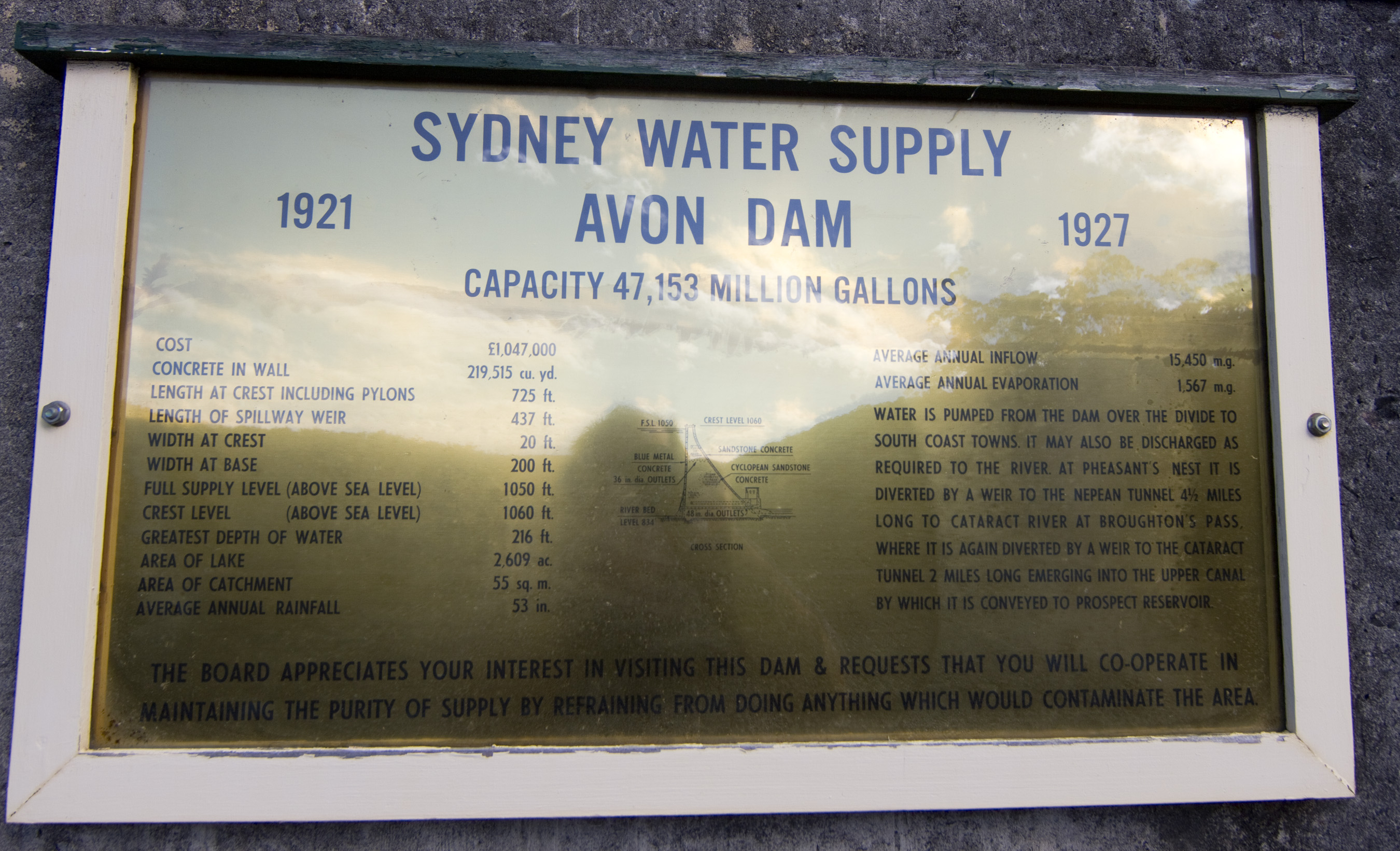
Avon Dam plate

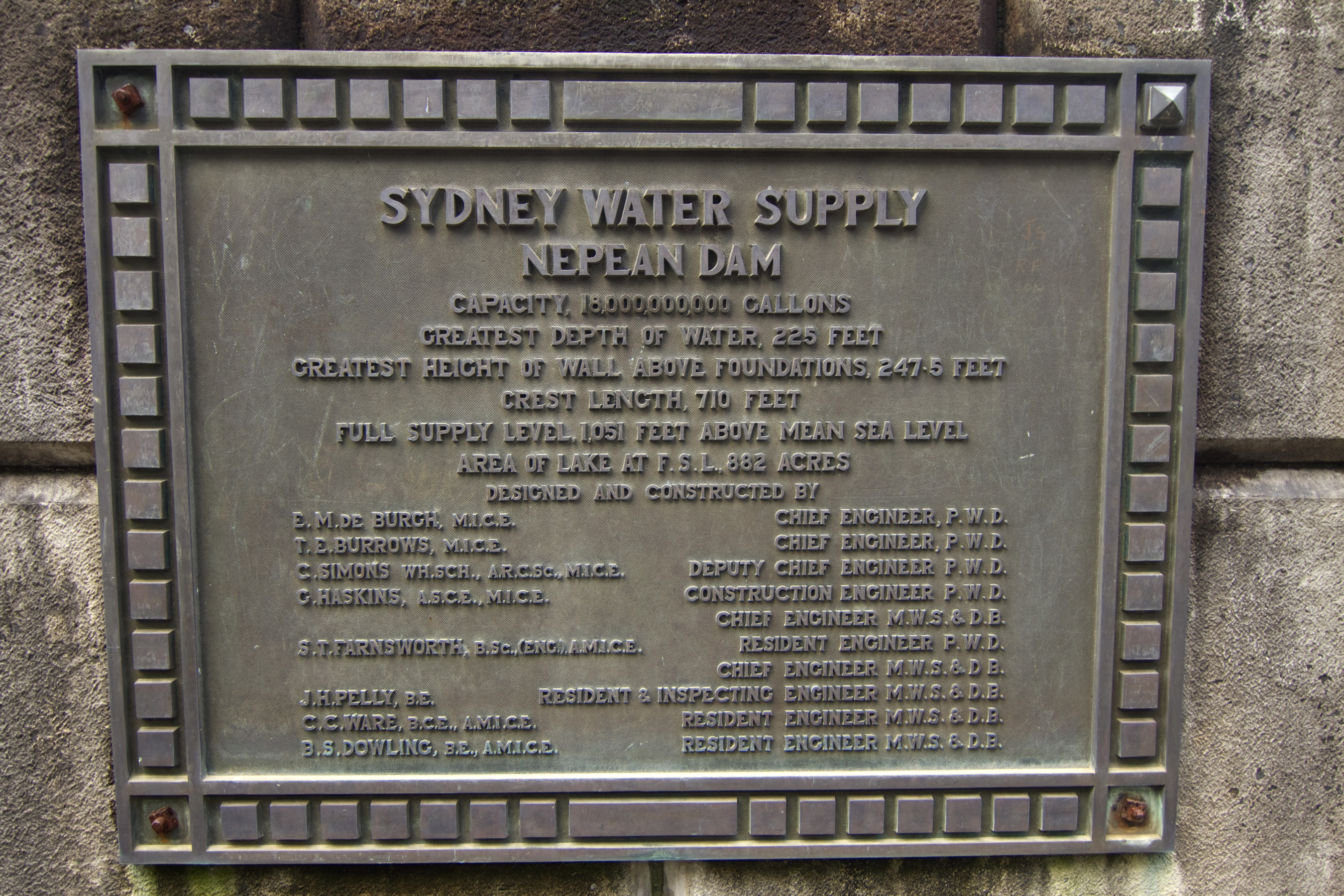
Nepean Dam plate

== See also ==
- List of reservoirs and dams in New South Wales
- Sydney Water
- Shoalhaven Scheme
- Upper Canal System
- Lower Prospect Canal Reserve
- Guildford West pipehead and water supply canal
