= Middle Falbrook, New South Wales =

Middle Falbrook
- Town
- Coordinates: 32°27′00″S 151°09′00″E
- Country: Australia
- State: New South Wales
- LGA: Singleton Council
- Location: 14 km (8.7 mi) NSW of Singleton

Government
  - State electorate: Upper Hunter
  - Federal division: Hunter

Population
  - Total: 92 (2016 census)
- Postcode: 2330

Middle Falbrook is a locality in the Singleton Council region of New South Wales, Australia. It had a population of 92 as of the 2016 census.

Middle Falbrook Public School operated from November 1889 until July 1937. It was renamed Glennies Creek Public School in August 1927, and was known by that name until its closure.

== Heritage listings ==
Middle Falbrook has a number of heritage-listed sites, including:

- Rixs Creek-Falbrook Road: Glennies Creek bridge
