= Cordeaux, New South Wales =

Suburb of the City of Wollongong in Australia

Coordinates: 34.3886°S 150.77944°E

Cordeaux is a suburb of the City of Wollongong, New South Wales, Australia.

== Heritage listings ==
Cordeaux has heritage-listed sites, including:

- Cordeaux Dam
