= Nepean Gorge =

Gorge in western Sydney, Australia

Coordinates: 33.830°S 150.595°E

The Nepean Gorge is a gorge on the Nepean River west of Sydney, New South Wales, Australia.

The gorge is located south of the western suburb of Penrith and is administered and protected by the NSW National Parks & Wildlife Service. It is near the schools of jamisontown carved through the sandstone typical of the region, Hawkesbury sandstone. There is some speculation as to why it runs through the eastern edge of the Blue Mountains rather than around it.

The gorge is popular for water recreation by small watercraft all year. Lookouts above the gorge are accessible by dirt roads on both banks and the area is steeped with Aboriginal history. Evidence of prehistoric volcanic activity in the area also exists in the soil and stone of nearby hills.

== See also ==
- Hawkesbury River
