= Upper Canal System =

Aqueduct in New South Wales, Australia

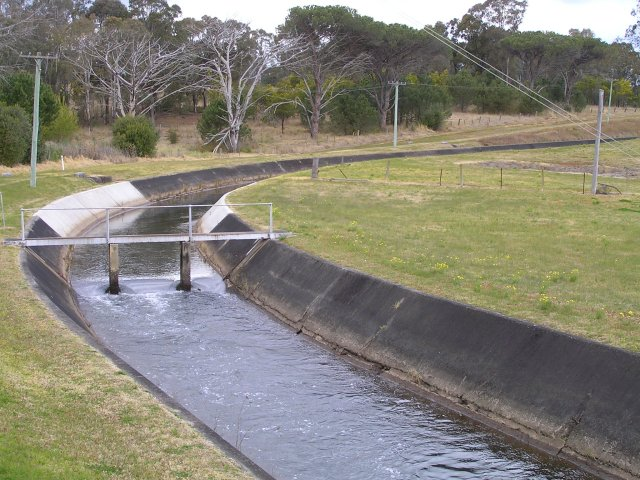
- Upper Canal at Bringelly Road
- Map of Upper Canal System

Location
- Country: Australia
- State: New South Wales
- Coordinates: 33°54′56″S 150°49′43″E
- Direction: South-west – North-east
- Start: Pheasants Nest
- Passes through: Wollondilly, Camden, Campbelltown, Liverpool, Fairfield, and Cumberland
- To: Prospect Reservoir

General information
- Type: Water
- Status: Operational
- Owner: WaterNSW
- Operator: Sydney Catchment Authority
- Construction started: c. 1880
- Commissioned: 1888

Technical information
- Length: 54 km (34 mi)
- No. of compressor stations: Nil
- No. of pumping stations: Nil

Designations

New South Wales Heritage Register
- Official name: Upper Canal System (Pheasants Nest Weir to Prospect Reservoir)
- Type: Built
- Criteria: a., b., e., f.
- Designated: 18 November 1999
- Part of: Utilities - Water group
- Reference no.: 01373

The Upper Canal System, also called the Southern Railway Aqueduct and the Cataract Tunnel, is a heritage-listed operational gravity-fed aqueduct that supplies some of the potable water for Sydney, in New South Wales, Australia. The aqueduct comprises 54 kilometres (34 mi) of open canals, tunnels, and closed pipelines that connect the Upper Nepean Scheme with the Prospect Reservoir. The aqueduct is managed by the Sydney Catchment Authority on behalf of WaterNSW, an agency of the Government of New South Wales. It was listed on the New South Wales State Heritage Register on 18 November 1999.

== Description ==
The Upper Canal forms a major component of the Upper Nepean Scheme. The Upper Nepean Scheme supplies water from the Cataract River at Broughtons Pass to the Crown Street reservoir, a distance of 101.79 kilometres (63.25 mi). The Upper Canal commences by tunnel from Pheasant's Nest Weir on the Nepean River and extends through the local government areas of Wollondilly, Camden, Campbelltown, Liverpool, Fairfield, and Cumberland, to terminate at the Prospect Reservoir.

After the Nepean and Cataract tunnels, the aqueduct drops just 50 metres (160 ft) in elevation over its 54-kilometre (34 mi) course, or just 0.1 percent grade.

The canal system is built from a variety of materials, depending on the nature of the country it passes through. Where the ground is soft, the canal system is trapezoidal in shape and the sides lined with unreinforced concrete slabs. In other sections, the canal is u-shaped and the sides are lined with sandstone masonry. Where the canal system is cut into solid rock, it is unlined. Tunnels allow the aqueduct to pass under hills. These are unlined if cut through solid rock, or lined with brick or sandstone if cut through softer material. Above ground pipelines allow the canal system to cross creeks and gullies. These were inverted iron syphons resting on sandstone piers. The Upper Canal has only one kilometre (zero point six two miles) of pipelines crossing nine creeks and the Main Southern railway line; with 19 kilometres (12 mi) of tunnels and 44 kilometres (27 mi) of open canal. Many of the original iron pipes remain in use, some lined with plastic sleeves to protect the pipes and keep them waterproof. Many of the original mechanisms to control and divert the water's flow - such as stop logs, penstocks, and gate valves - are also still in use.

In recent years, water control structures have been installed to assist with regulation of water levels in the canal and to cater for varying flow rates.

It is estimated that the Upper Nepean System and, hence, the Upper Canal System, supplies in the range of 20 to 40 per cent of Sydney's daily demand for potable water.

== History ==
In 1867, the Governor of New South Wales appointed a Commission to recommend a scheme for Sydney's water supply, and by 1869 it was recommended that construction commence on the Upper Nepean Scheme. This consisted of two diversion weirs, located at Pheasant's Nest and Broughton's Pass, in the Upper Nepean River catchment, with water feeding into a series of tunnels, canals and aqueducts known as the Upper Canal. It was intended that water be fed by gravity from the catchment into a reservoir at Prospect. This scheme was to be Sydney's fourth water supply system, following the Tank Stream, Busby's Bore and the Botany Swamps. The Upper Canal, now managed by the Sydney Catchment Authority, is divided into eleven maintenance sections, from Pheasant's Nest to the Prospect Reservoir. Historically each of these sections had its own section keeper, with a cottage built along the section.

== Heritage listing ==
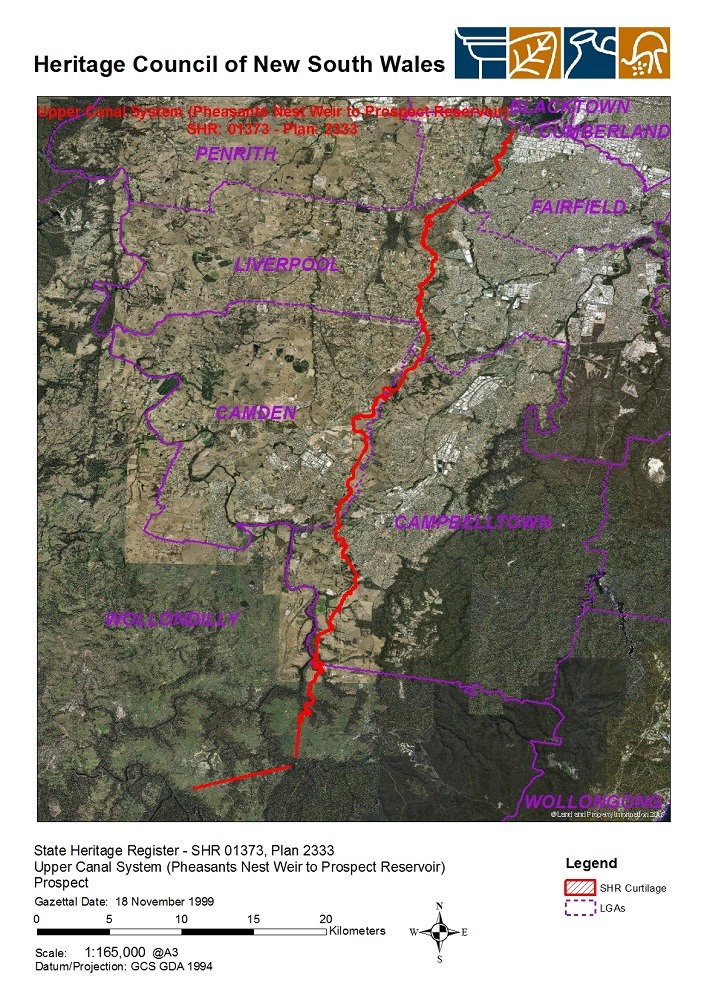
Upper Canal System from Pheasants Nest Weir to Prospect Reservoir

The aqueduct was listed on the New South Wales State Heritage Register on 18 November 1999 with the following statement of significance:

The Upper Canal System is significant as a major component of the Upper Nepean Scheme. As an element of this Scheme, the Canal has functioned as part of Sydney's main water supply system since 1888. Apart from maintenance and other improvements, the Upper Canal has changed little. As part of this System, the Canal is associated with Edward Moriarty, Head of the Harbours and Rivers Branch of the NSW Public Works Department. The Canal is aesthetically significant, running in a serpentine route through a rural bushland setting as an impressive landscape element with sandstone and concrete-lined edges; and is also significant as it demonstrates the techniques of canal building, and evidence of engineering practice. The Canal as a whole is an excellent example of 19th century hydraulic engineering, including the use of gravity to feed water along the canal.

— Statement of significance, New South Wales State Heritage Register.

== See also ==
- List of reservoirs and dams in New South Wales
- Prospect Reservoir Valve House
- Sydney Water
- Shoalhaven Scheme
- Upper Nepean Scheme
