= Avon River (Wollongong) =

River in the Southern Highlands and Macarthur districts of New South Wales, Australia

Coordinates: 34°25′54″S 150°40′04″E

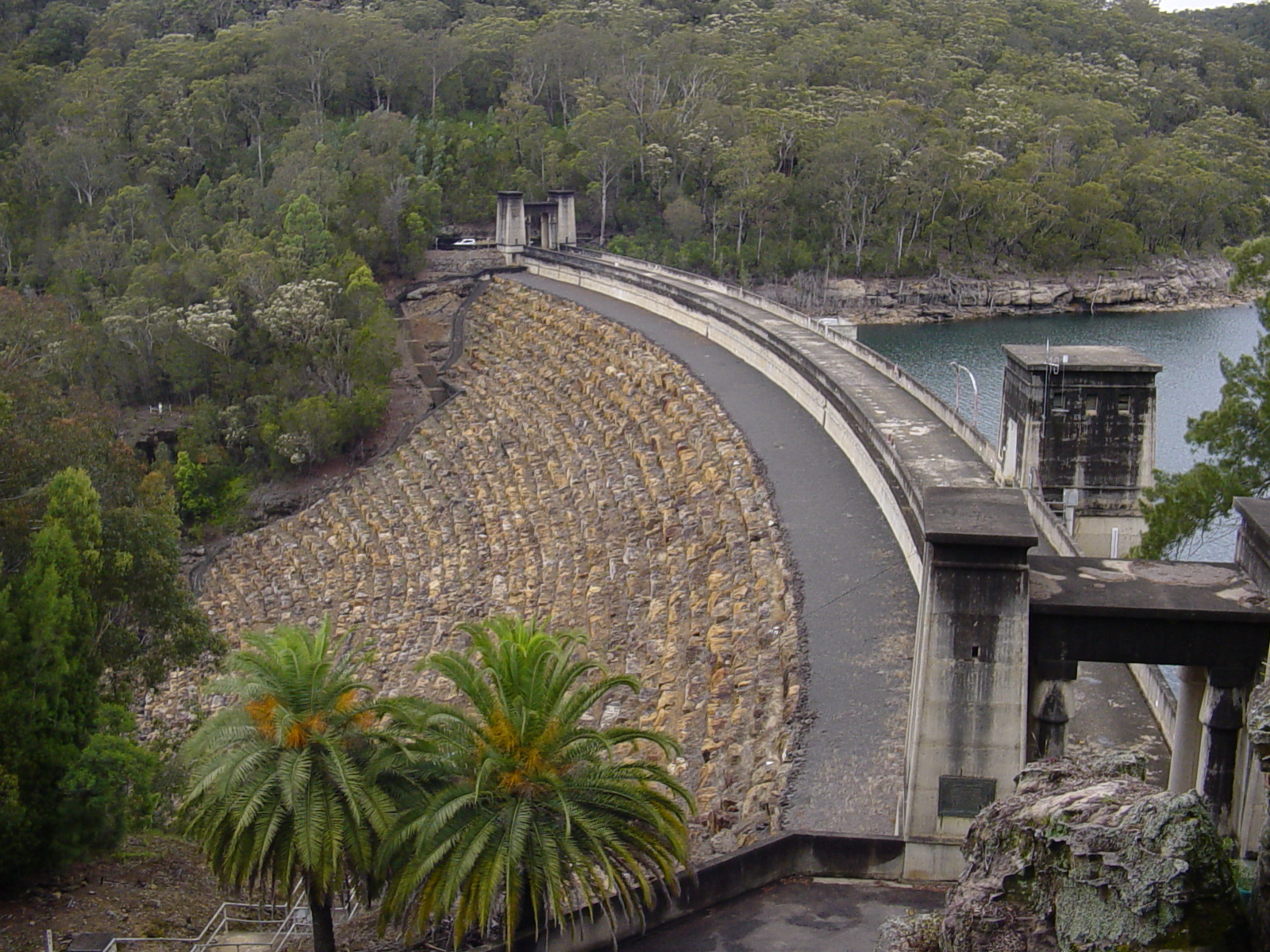
- The Avon Dam

- Location of mouth

Location
- Country: Australia
- State: New South Wales
- Region: Sydney Basin (IBRA), Southern Highlands, Macarthur
- Local government areas: Wollongong, Wollondilly

Physical characteristics
- Source: Illawarra escarpment
  - location: west of Calderwood
  - elevation: 348 m (1,142 ft)
- Mouth: confluence with the Cordeaux River
  - location: near Wilton
  - elevation: 193 m (633 ft)
- Length: 32 km (20 mi)

Basin features
- River system: Hawkesbury-Nepean catchment
- Reservoir: Lake Avon

The Avon River is a perennial river of the Hawkesbury-Nepean catchment, in the Southern Highlands and Macarthur districts of New South Wales, Australia.

== Course ==
The Avon River rises on the western slopes of the Illawarra escarpment, near Calderwood within the Wollongong local government area and flows generally north, reaching its confluence with the Cordeaux River, south of Wilton. The river descends 155 metres (509 ft) over its 32-kilometre (20 mi) course.

The river is impounded by Lake Avon, the largest of the four reservoirs within the Upper Nepean Scheme that supplies potable water for greater metropolitan Sydney. Located near Bargo, approximately 100 kilometres (62 mi) south-west of Sydney, construction of Avon Dam commenced in 1921 and was completed in 1927. In 1963, the water supply was diverted to meet the increasing needs of the Illawarra region and now supplies all the Wollongong area.

== See also ==
- List of rivers of New South Wales (A–K)
- Rivers of New South Wales
- Upper Nepean Scheme
