= Cordeaux River =

Coordinates: 34°16′S 150°41′E

Cordeaux
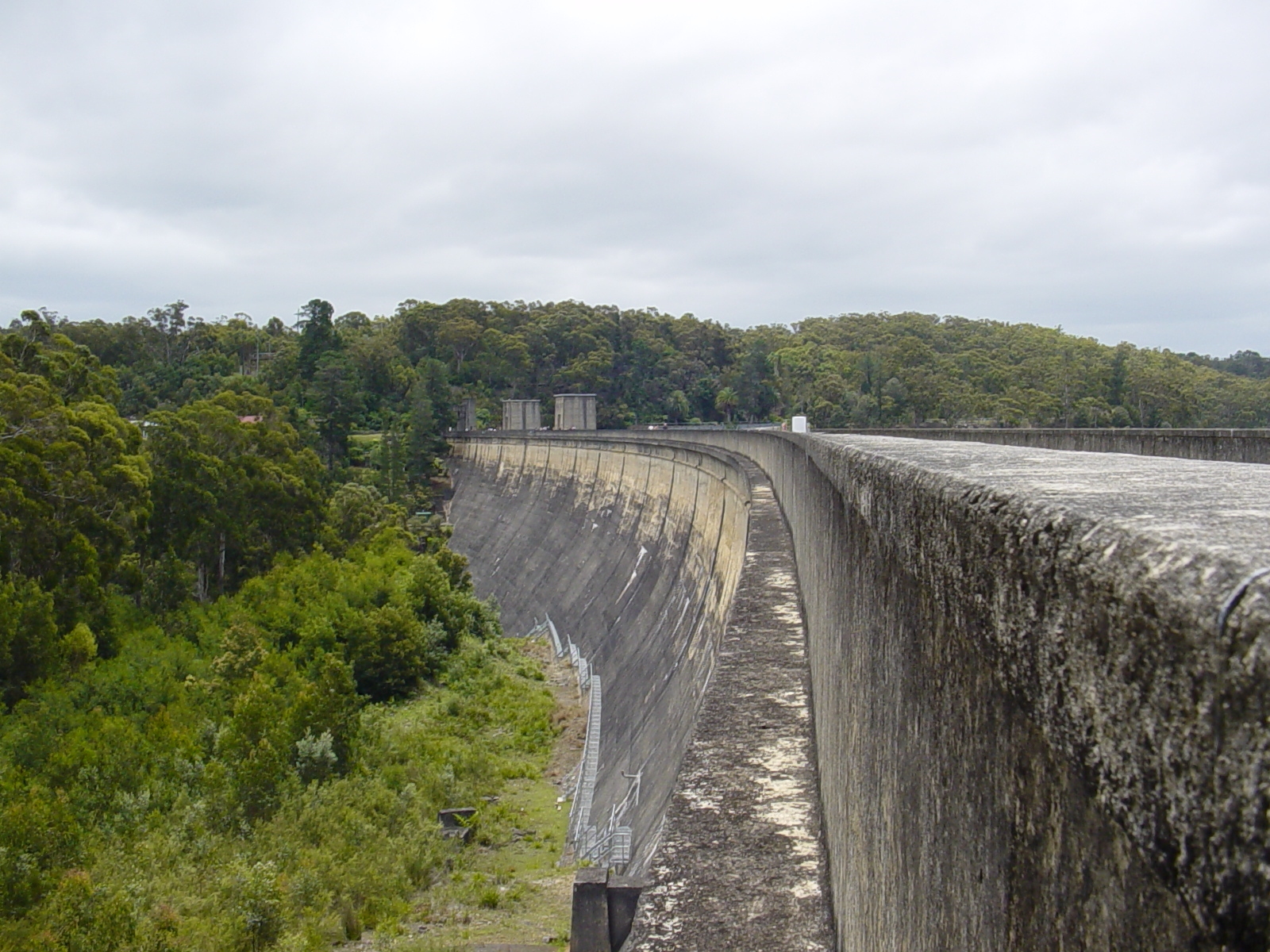
- Cordeaux Dam

Location
- Country: Australia
- State: New South Wales
- Region: Sydney Basin (IBRA), Southern Highlands, Macarthur
- Municipalities: Wollongong, Wollondilly

Physical characteristics
- Source: Illawarra escarpment
  - location: below Mount Keira
  - elevation: 315 m (1,033 ft)
- Mouth: confluence with the Nepean River
  - location: near Wilton
  - elevation: 147 m (482 ft)
- Length: 32 km (20 mi)

Basin features
- River system: Hawkesbury-Nepean catchment
- Tributaries
  - left: Avon River (Wollongong)
- Reservoir: Lake Cordeaux

The Cordeaux River, a perennial river of the Hawkesbury-Nepean catchment, is located in the Southern Highlands and Macarthur regions of New South Wales, Australia.

== Course ==
The Cordeaux River rises on the western slopes of the Illawarra escarpment, below Mount Keira within the Wollongong local government area and flows generally north and northwest, joined by the Avon River, before reaching its confluence with the Nepean River, south of Wilton. The river descends 168 metres (551 ft) over its 37-kilometre (23 mi) course.

The river is impounded by Lake Cordeaux, one of four reservoirs within the Upper Nepean Scheme that supplies potable water for greater metropolitan Sydney. Located near Ryans Crossing, approximately 94 kilometres (58 mi) south-west of Sydney, construction of the dam wall on the Cordeaux River commenced in 1918 and was completed in 1926.

== Locality ==
The "address locality" of Cordeaux is defined as a suburb of the City of Wollongong, "lying beside the Cordeaux River between Lake Cordeaux and Upper Cordeaux No 1 Dam". At the 2016 census, it had no population.

== See also ==
- List of rivers of Australia
- List of rivers of New South Wales (A–K)
- Rivers of New South Wales
- Upper Nepean Scheme
