= Cataract River (Wollondilly) =

Coordinates: 34°15′S 150°47′E

Cataract
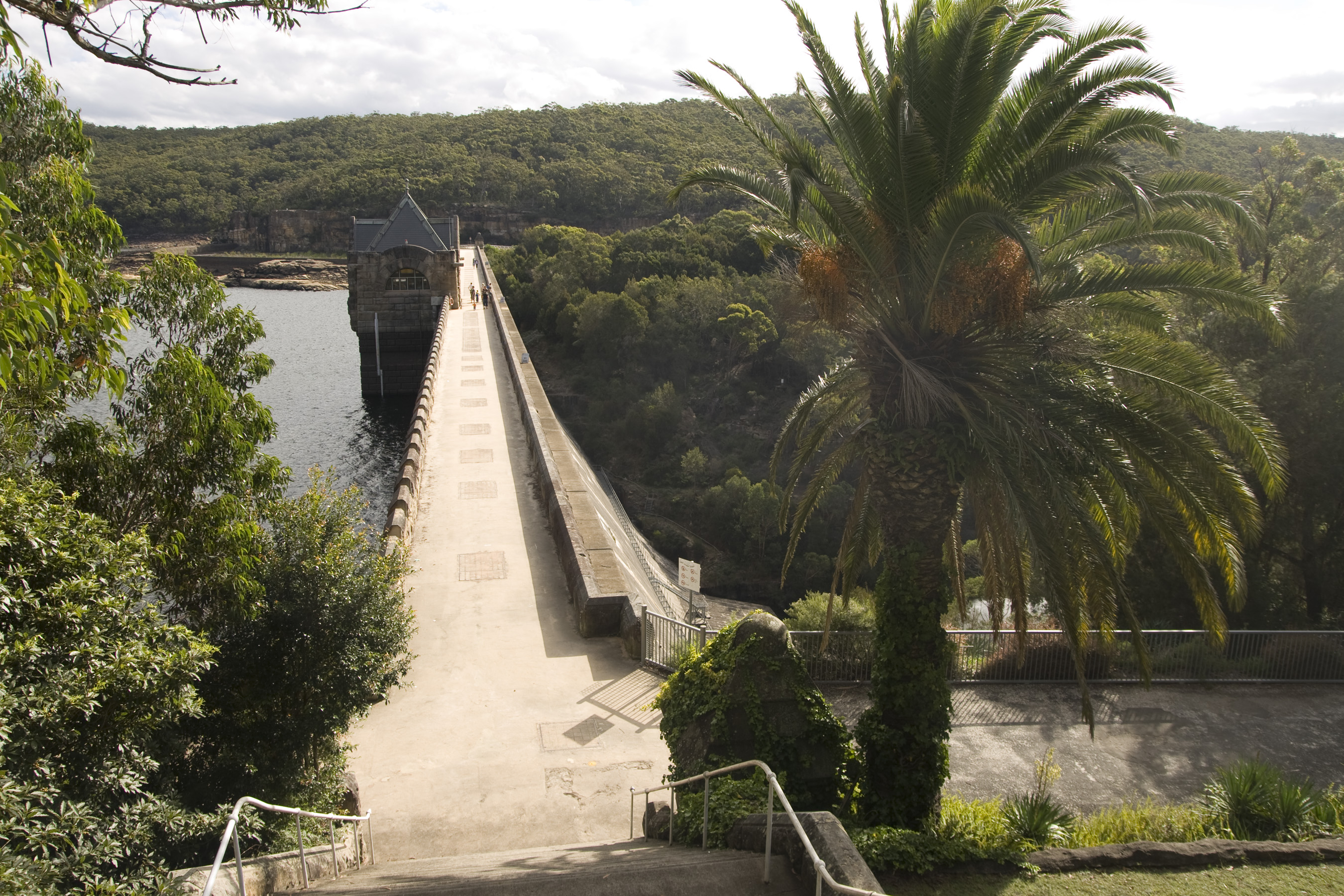
- Cataract Dam on the Cataract River

Location
- Country: Australia
- State: New South Wales
- Region: Sydney Basin (IBRA), Macarthur
- LGA: Wollondilly

Physical characteristics
- Source: Illawarra escarpment
  - location: west of Mount Pleasant
  - elevation: 293 m (961 ft)
- Mouth: confluence with the Nepean River
  - location: Douglas Park
  - elevation: 78 m (256 ft)
- Length: 23 km (14 mi)

Basin features
- River system: Hawkesbury-Nepean catchment
- Reservoir: Lake Cataract

The Cataract River, a perennial river that is part of the Hawkesbury-Nepean catchment, is located in the Macarthur region of New South Wales, Australia.

== Course and features ==
The Cataract River rises on the western slopes of the Illawarra escarpment, west of Mount Pleasant, and flows generally north northwest, impounded within Lake Cataract, before reaching its confluence with the Nepean River at Douglas Park. The river descends 215 metres (705 ft) over its 23-kilometre (14 mi) course.

The river is a source of water for the Sydney region. Water is collected by the dams, weirs and aqueducts of the Upper Nepean Scheme.

== See also ==
- Rivers of New South Wales
- List of rivers of New South Wales (A–K)
- List of rivers of Australia
- Upper Nepean Scheme
