= Ernest de Burgh =

Australian civil engineer (1863–1929)

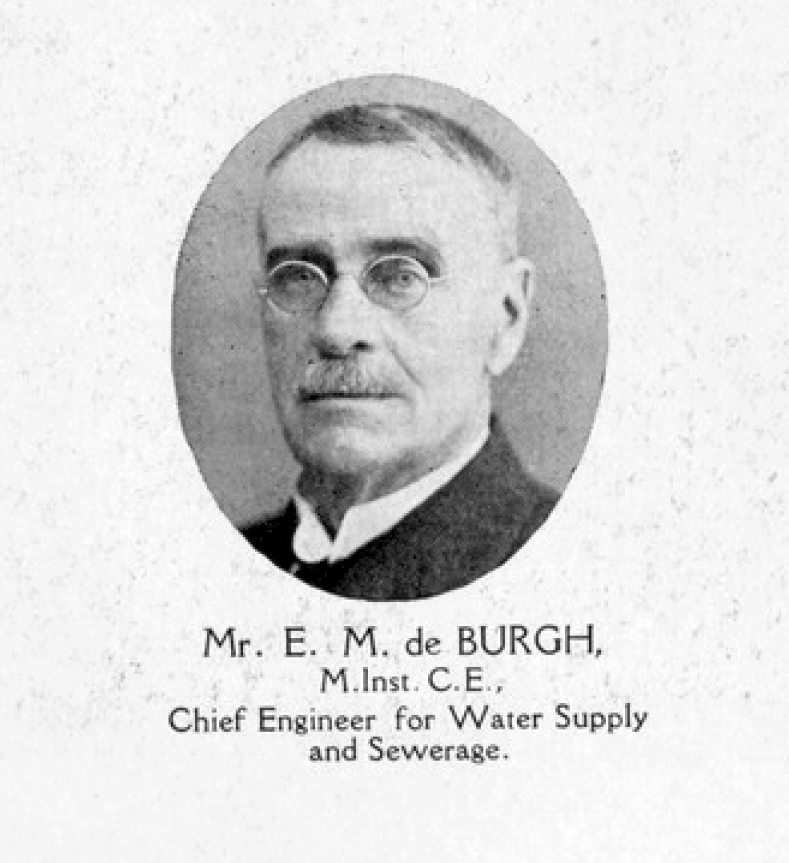
- Born: Ernest Macartney de Burgh; 18 January 1863; Ireland
- Died: 4 April 1929 (aged 66); Vaucluse, New South Wales, Australia
- Education: Rathmines School, Dublin; Royal College of Science for Ireland
- Known for: Roads engineer
- Spouse: Constance M Yeo (1888-1929)
- Children: Thomas de Burgh

Ernest Macartney de Burgh (English: /dəˈbɜːr/ də-BUR; 18 January 1863 – 4 April 1929) was an Irish-born Australian civil engineer, chief-engineer for water supply and sewerage in New South Wales.

== Engineering in Australia ==
De Burgh then migrated to Australia, arriving in Melbourne on the Orient 21 March 1885. Travelling to Sydney de Burgh began working for the New South Wales public works department and was engaged on survey work for Sydney's southern outfall sewer.

== Later life and legacy ==
De Burgh was a member of the Institution of Civil Engineers, London, and was twice winner of the Telford premium. De Burghs Bridge over the Lane Cove River, Sydney, is named after him. The De Burgh Dam near the Burrinjuck Dam was also named after him. The dam is considered to be the first reinforced-concrete thin arch dam in Australia.

He married Constance Mary, née Yeo, on 20 March 1888 who survived him along with two sons and a daughter. (Thomas de Burgh also an engineer with MWS&DB)

De Burgh retired on 22 November 1927 and died of tuberculosis at Vaucluse, Sydney on 4 April 1929.

== De Burgh timbertruss ==
Ernest De Burgh's bridges were the fourth type of timber truss bridge in a series of five used. These included 1865 Old PWD, 1884 McDonald, 1894 Allan, 1899 de Burgh and 1905 Dare. Each was a technical improvement on its predecessor.

== Gallery ==
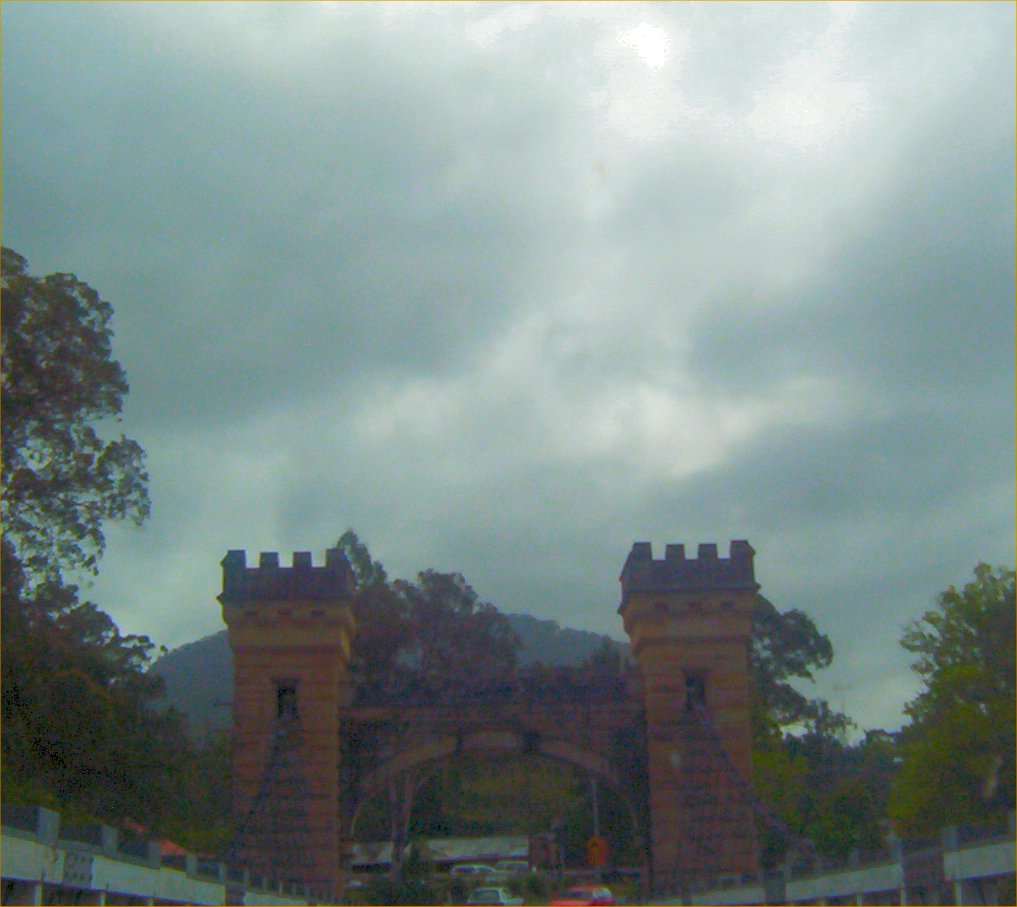
Hampden Bridge Kangaroo Valley

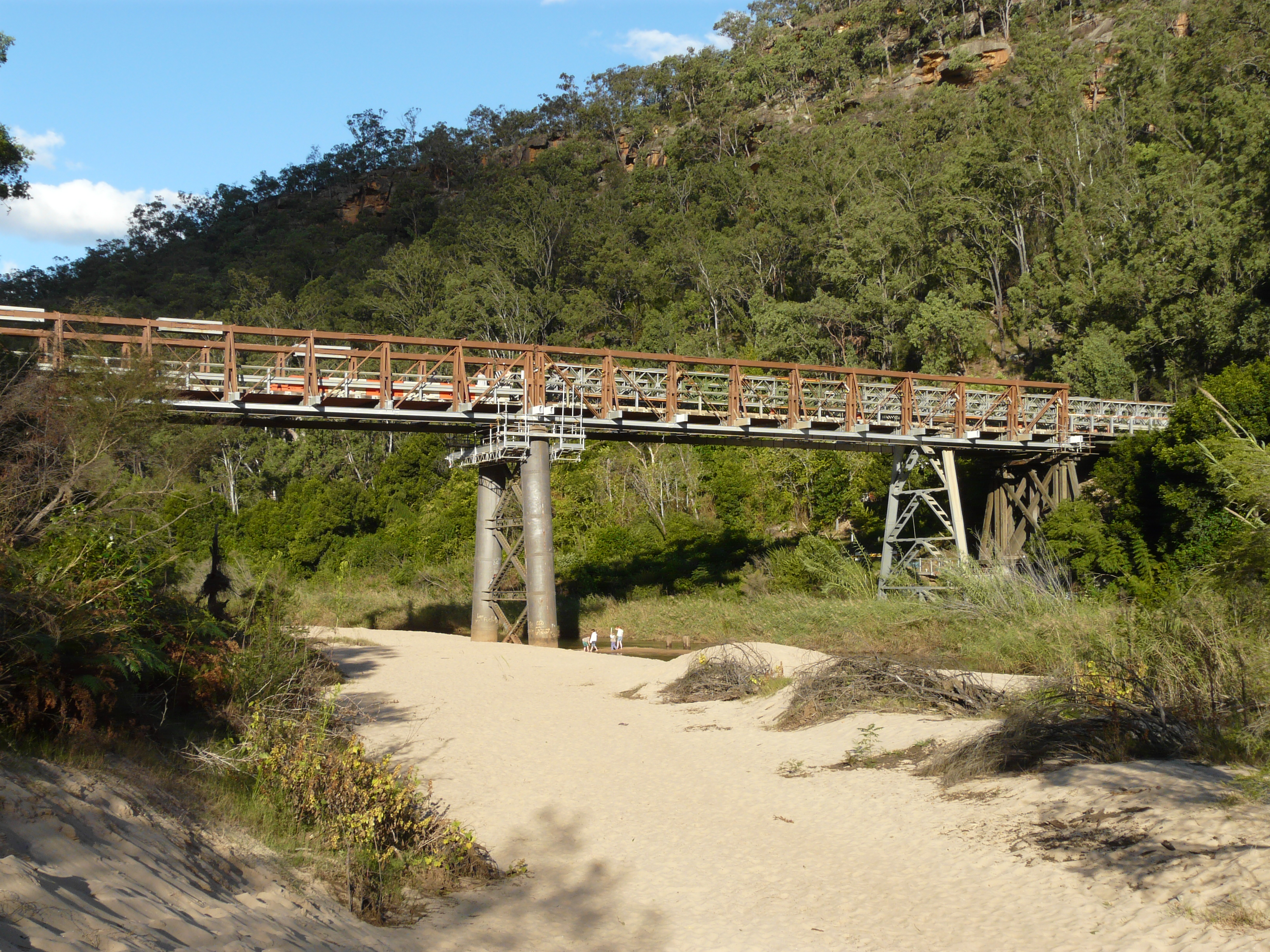
Bridge across the Macdonald River

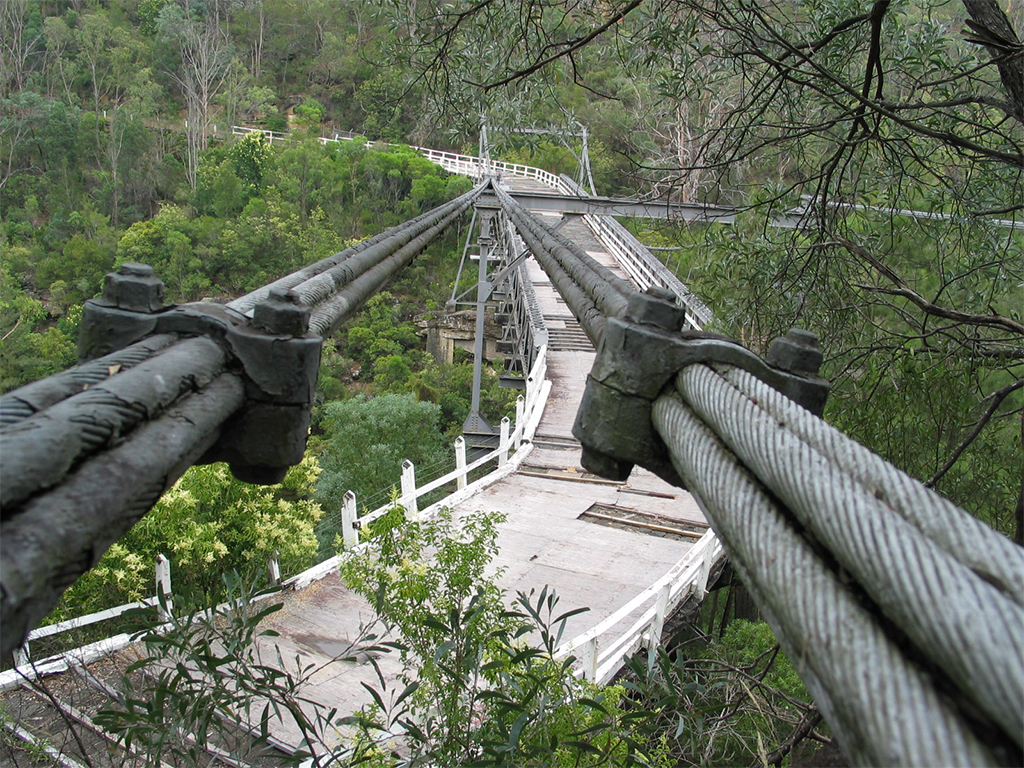
Maldon Suspension Bridge

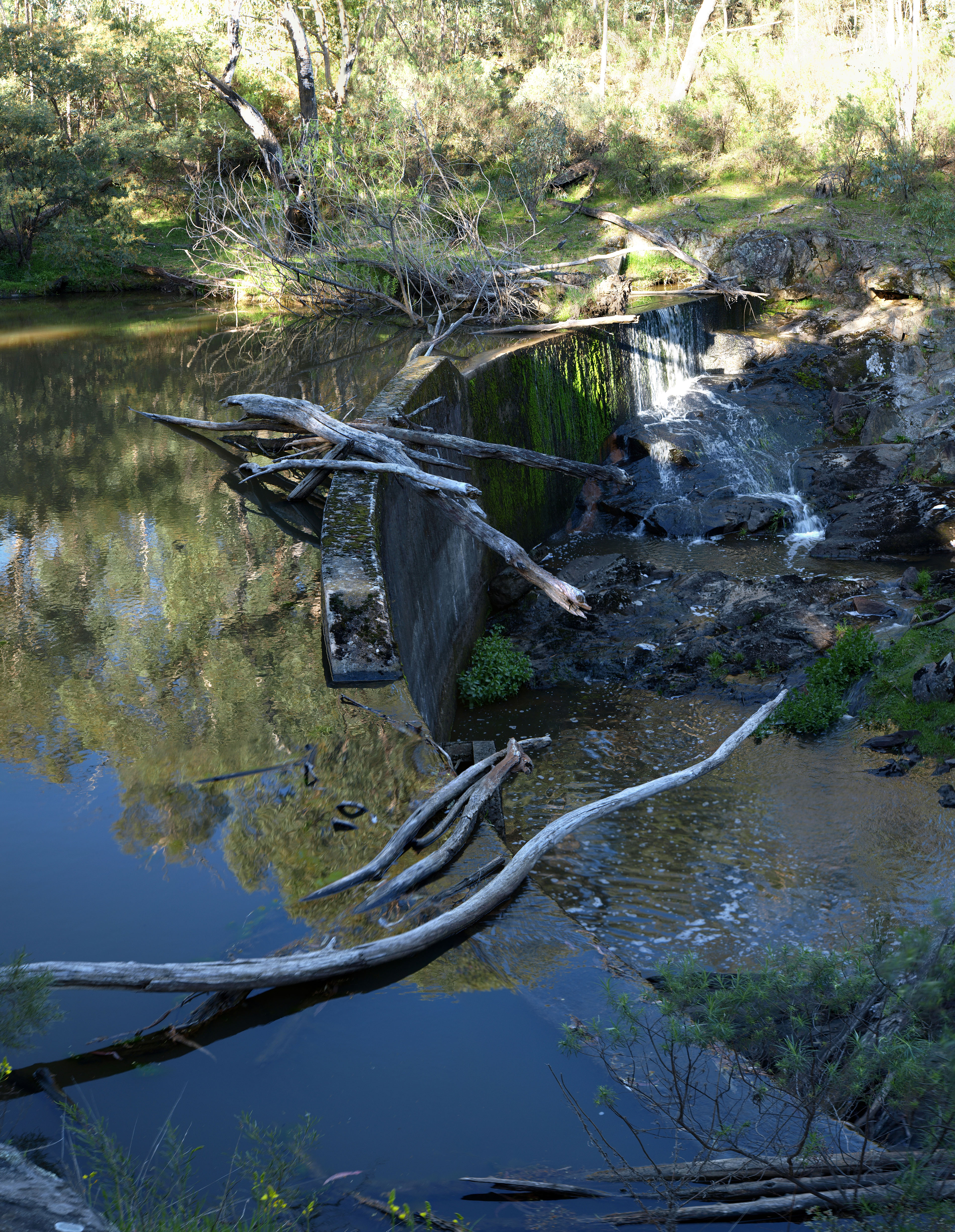
De Burgh Dam near the Burrinjuck Dam.
