= Cataract Dam =

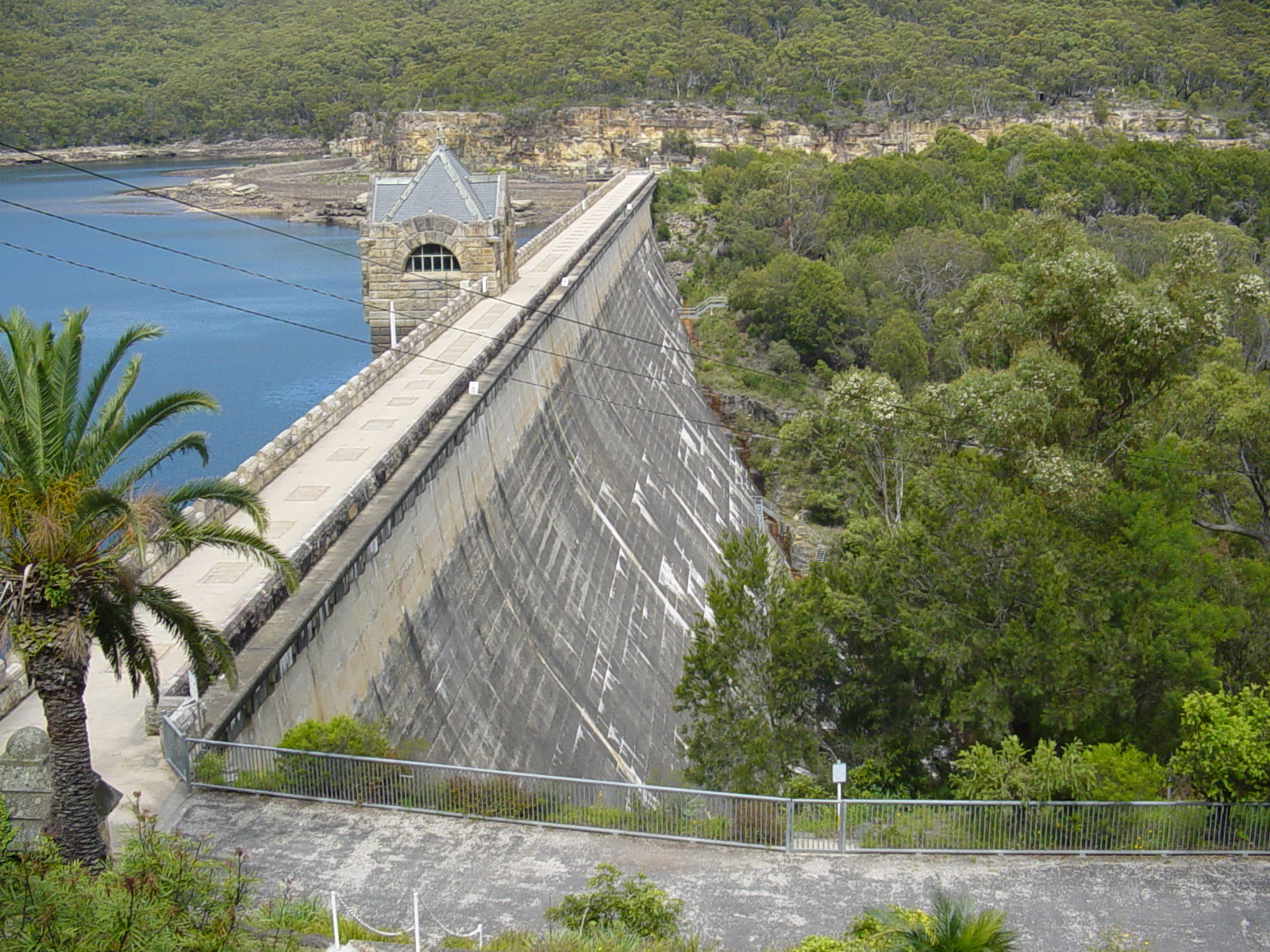
- Cataract Dam wall

- Location in New South Wales
- Country: Australia
- Location: Cataract Road, Cataract, New South Wales
- Coordinates: 34°15′56″S 150°48′11″E
- Purpose: Potable water supply
- Status: Operational
- Construction began: 1902
- Opening date: 1907
- Construction cost: A£329,136
- Built by: Public Works Department
- Designed by: L A B Wade; J J C Bradfield
- Operator: Sydney Catchment Authority

Dam and spillways
- Type of dam: Gravity dam
- Impounds: Cataract River
- Height: 56 m (184 ft)
- Length: 247 m (810 ft)
- Dam volume: 112×10^{3} m^{3} (4.0×10^{6} cu ft)
- Spillway type: Uncontrolled
- Spillway capacity: 1,550 m^{3}/s (55,000 cu ft/s)

Reservoir
- Total capacity: 94,300 ML (2.07×10^{10} imp gal; 2.49×10^{10} US gal)
- Catchment area: 130 km^{2} (50 sq mi)
- Surface area: 851 ha (2,100 acres)
- Website; Cataract Dam at Sydney Catchment Authority

New South Wales Heritage Register
- Official name: Cataract Dam
- Type: State heritage (built)
- Criteria: a., b., c., d., e., f., g.
- Designated: 18 November 1999
- Reference no.: 01359
- Type: Water Supply Reservoir/ Dam
- Category: Utilities – Water
- Builders: Department of Public Works

The Cataract Dam is a heritage-listed dam in Cataract (formerly Appin), New South Wales, Australia, provides water to the Macarthur and Illawarra regions, the Wollondilly Shire, and metropolitan Sydney. It is one of four dams and weirs in the catchment of the Upper Nepean Scheme. Completed in 1907 under the supervision of Ernest Macartney de Burgh, the dam is currently owned by Water NSW, an agency of the Government of New South Wales. The dam was listed on the NSW State Heritage Register on 18 November 1999.

== Structural details ==
A gravity dam with an unlined side spillway extending from the left abutment, it is 56 metres (184 ft) tall; 247 metres (810 ft) long; and it holds 94,300 megalitres (20.7×10^{9} imp gal; 24.9×10^{9} US gal) of water. Cataract Dam was the first dam built in the Upper Nepean Scheme. It was also the first dam in Australia to use pre-cast moulded concrete blocks for the upstream face of the dam. The downstream face is of mass poured basalt concrete, with a basalt facing. A readily accessible source of suitable rock was located at Sherbrooke, situated near the top of Bulli Pass. To transport the basalt from the quarry to the dam construction site, a 2 ft (610 mm) gauge steam tramway, 8.8 kilometres (5.5 mi) long, was constructed.

The dam is built of cyclopean masonry, composed of sandstone blocks weighing from 2 to 4.5 long tons (2.03 to 4.57 t; 2.24 to 5.04 short tons). These were quarried at the site and bedded in cement mortar. The vertical joints were filled with basalt or sandstone concrete. The upstream face consisted of basalt concrete moulded blocks set in a cement mortar. The downstream face was of basalt concrete, 1.8 metres (5 ft 11 in) thick in the lower section and 0.9 metres (2 ft 11 in) thick in the upper section. There were two lines of 122-centimetre (48 in) diameter pipes which passed through the dam and discharged water into the Nepean River. The flow is controlled by a Larner Johnson needle valve. The dam wall was given a decorative finish. The upstream parapet was castellated with sandstone blocks while the top of the downstream wall was corbelled in concrete. In approximately the midsection of the dam stands the valve house. This is finished in quarried sandstone blocks with ashlar coursing. It features a steeply pitched slate-covered pipped roof topped with finials and gables at either side.

Dam construction began in 1902 and was completed in 1907, and the spillway was widened in 1915. E. M. de Burgh was the supervising engineer for the project from 1904.

== History ==
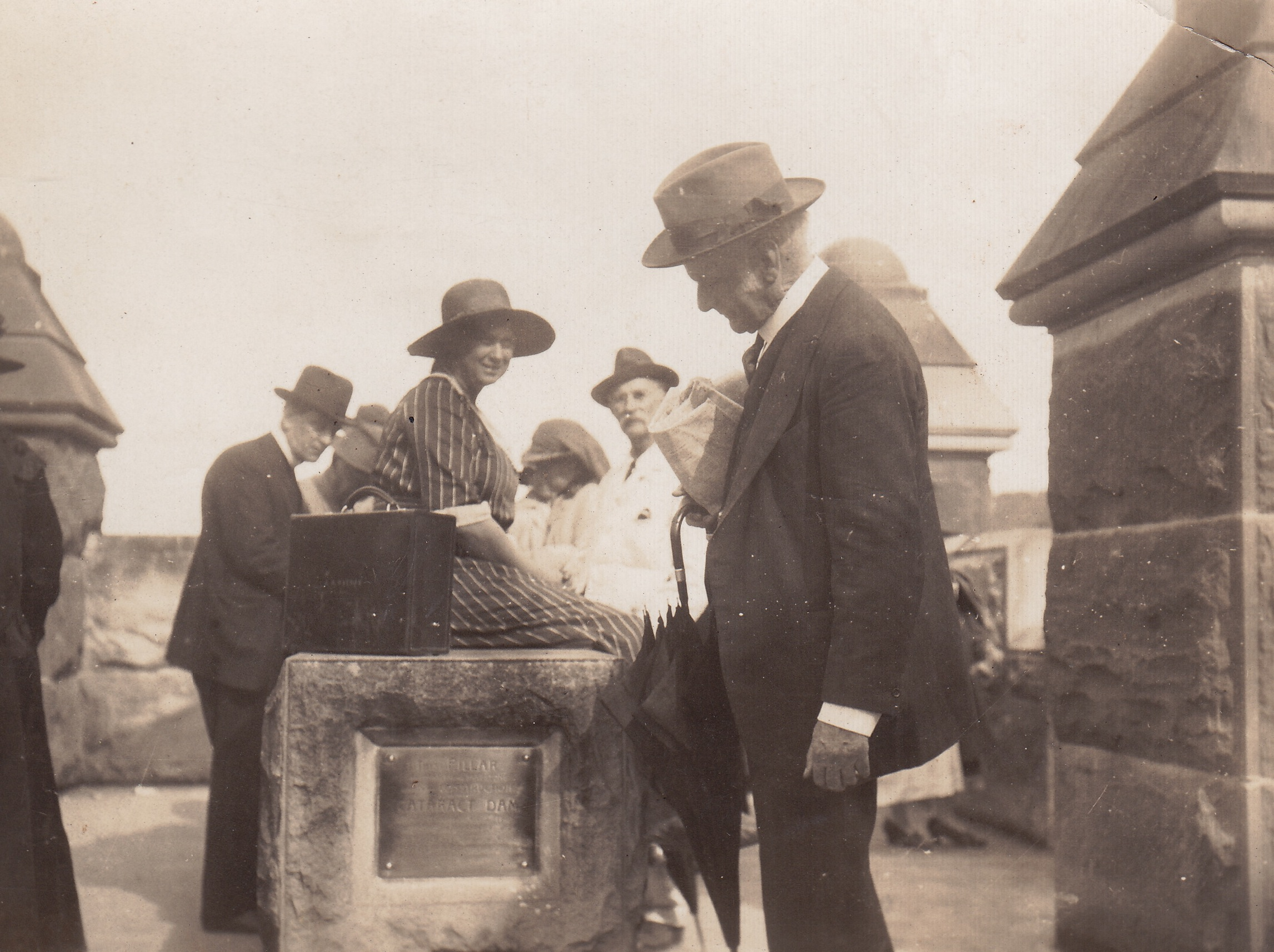
Cataract Dam - Judge Backhouse in foreground, 22 April 1922

The Upper Nepean Scheme was commenced in 1880 after it was realised that the Botany Swamps scheme was insufficient to meet Sydney's water supply needs. The Nepean project consisted of the construction of a weir across the Nepean River to divert of the rivers Cataract, Cordeaux, Avon and Nepean, to the Prospect Reservoir.

The design and construction of Cataract Dam was undertaken by the Water Supply and Sewerage Branch and Harbour and Rivers Branch of the New South Wales Public Works Department. The construction of the dam necessitated the knowledge and experience of a number of engineers employed in the branches at the time including Cecil Darley (NSW Inspecting Engineer in London), Leslie Wade (Principal Engineer, Water Supply and Sewerage Branch), Henry Dare and Ernest M. de Burgh (Supervising Engineers). The successful completion of the dam and its continuation of use as a water supply dam are a lasting testament to the professional capabilities of the late Victorian/Edwardian era generation of engineers of the Public Works Department. The association of Thomas Keele with the initial dam proposal, and the subsequent problems associated with the cost and the ongoing Royal Commissions into the project was immortalised through Banjo Paterson's satirical ballad The Dam that Keele Built.

=== Appin ===
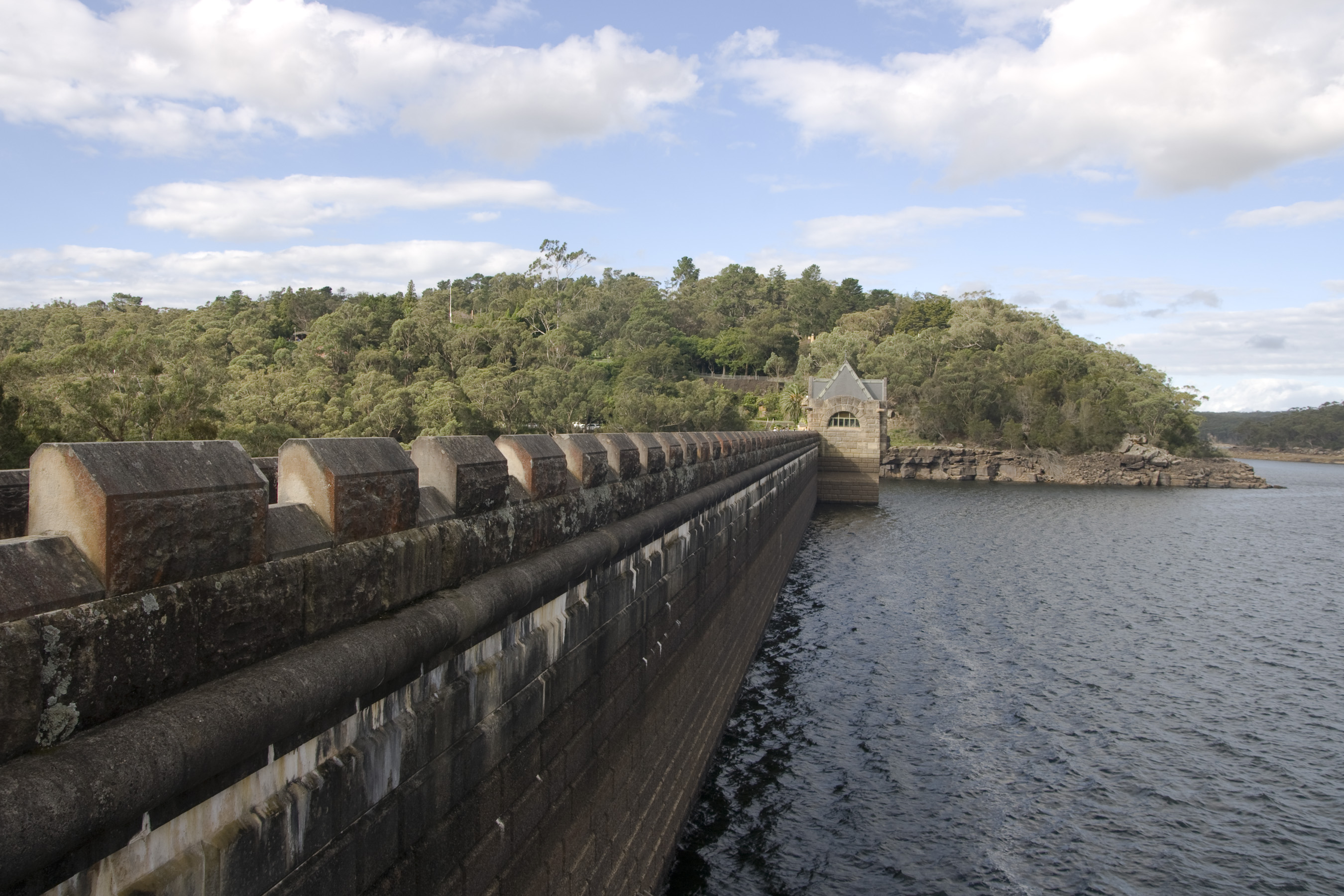
Cataract Dam in 2010

Appin town's name came about, despite that most local settlers came from Irish stock, due to Governor Macquarie's arrival in the colony in 1810. At the time, Government House was in Parramatta and one of Macquarie's first intentions was to travel into the nearby country to discover the best land from which the colony could be provided with food. It was already known that the most productive area for that purpose was the Hawkesbury River country, but these districts had proven precarious because of severe flooding which caused great losses in crops and stock.

The land Macquarie intended to study lay between the Nepean and Georges Rivers. There had been no identification of the land which ran as far south as the Cataract River and was bounded on the west by the Nepean River and on the east by the Georges River. On completion of his survey, this area reminded him so much of his own (home) district in Scotland that he called it the Airds district. Some time later he named the section south, including Mount Gilead, Appin.

One of the earliest buildings in the town, still standing, is the Anglican school, where the first generation of children born in Appin received their education. This was erected about 1815.

Macquarie gave many grants of land in order to develop the land. The first was 405 hectares (1,000 acres) granted to Sydney magistrate and acting commissary-general, William Broughton. There were several other grants of smaller amounts, made on condition that after five years, unless sufficient progress had been made in cropping and stocking, the land would revert to the Crown. The district became a great supplier of wheat, corn and barley, carried to Sydney by wagons pulled by teams of bullocks or horses.

The northern boundary of the Appin district is the property known as Mount Gilead, which was granted to Reuben Uther. Some years later it was purchased by a Sydney businessman, Thomas Rose, who was credited with building the first dam for water conservation in the colony (here). This was carried out very thoroughly and with great expense. He was generous with the water conserved and allowed his neighbours to water their stock in very dry times.

He applied to the Governor for some reimbursement, but was refused. This dam was built in 1824. In 1836 Rose built the huge stone windmill, one of the largest of its kind which gave great service for many years grinding wheat of the surrounding areas. In those early years, in a good season, yields in some areas were as high as 45 bushels to the acre. The windmill is still standing; that is the four-storey tower which has long been converted to a water tank; but the top hammer and sails have long-since disappeared.

On the southern side, Mount Gilead was joined by the Hume (family) properties, Beulan and Meadowvale (formerly Rockwood). These and others such as Fairview, Blossom Lodge, Mount Carlon and the big poultry farm conducted by Ingham enterprises are all on the western side of the Appin Road. Opposite the last property is one known as Kildare, one of the pioneer homes of the Irish Dwyer family.

Further west was Lesson's Green, an 32-hectare (80-acre) grant to William Crowe, the northern boundary of which joined a 40-hectare (100-acre) grant to John Dwyer, which in turn joined Macquarie Dale, a second grant of 283 hectares (700 acres) made to William Broughton in 1816, which ran as far (west) as the Nepean River. South of this is the property of Elladale, of 506 hectares (1,250 acres) granted to Alexander Riley in 1812, the boundary to Macquarie Dale (of which) is Elladale Creek. This was later greatly reduced in size by subdivisions and sales. By about 1840, when purchased by Rev. Sparling, the first incumbent at St. Mark's Anglican Church in Appin, it had shrunk to 243 hectares (600 acres).

On its southern boundary, it was joined by Broughton's 405-hectare (1,000-acre) Lachlan Vale (the first land grant in the area). That property in turn joined John Kennedy's original 162 hectares (400 acres) grant, that he named Teston. In later years, different owners added to it, growing the property to over 405 hectares (1,000 acres). This acreage on the south side joined the area known as Mount Brittain of 73 hectares (180 acres), a grant to William Sykes. With further grants it became over 121 hectares (300 acres).

Further south, Mount Brittain joined a 20-hectare (50-acre) grant to James Jordan, the southern boundary being the Cataract River and here was the place known as Jordan's Crossing, where the road from Mount Keira (now Picton Road) crossed the river. There were a number of small 20-hectare (50-acre) grants on the way back to Appin such as those of John Firth, Edward McGee, John Trotter, Nicholas Bryan and Matthew Pearce (40 hectares (100 acres)) and several others. Laurence D'Arcy was also granted 77 hectares (190 acres) joining Jordan's and named it Spring Valley.

Other grantees were James Byrne (121 hectares (300 acres)) and Andrew Byrne who had a grant between what is now Ingham enterprises and John Anderson's property that he named Ousedale, the creek that ran through it still bearing this name. A number of the small grants were brought together by purchase and the well-known property of Windmill Hill came into being, owned by William Larkin. This name was given to it because Larkin built a timber windmill on the highest part of it (about the mid-1840s) and it gave great service for many years. The farm later became the property of the Winton family who ran it as a dairy farm until recent years.

Appin has two solidly-built stone churches, St. Bede's Roman Catholic and St. Mark's Anglican. Both were built about the same time, 1840–41 and have stood the test of time. Both are equipped with very good bells.

The population of Appin was quite large: in 1825 the number was 562. A large number of farmers were engaged in wheat, barley, corn and vegetable growing for the Sydney market.

=== Upper Nepean Scheme ===
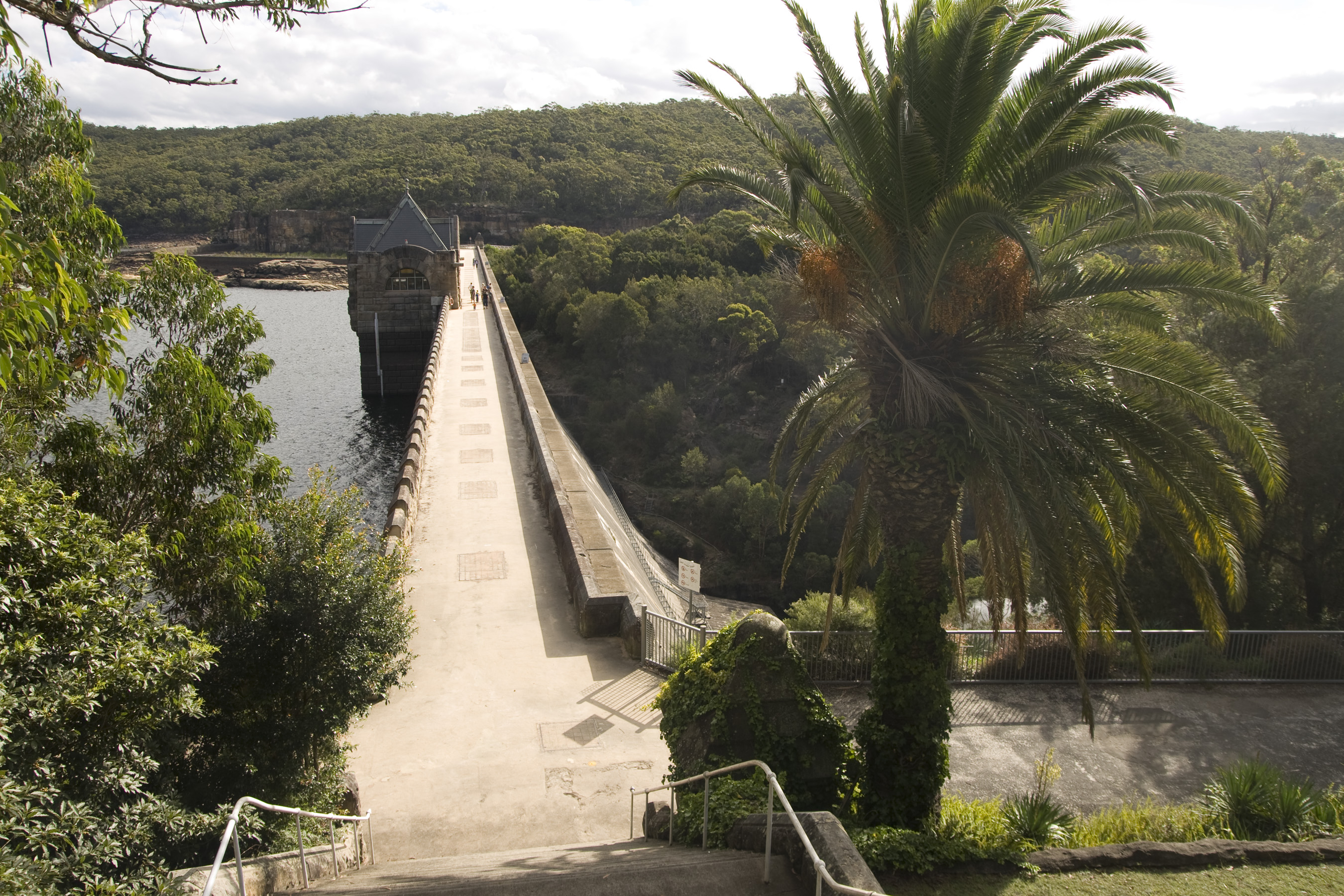
Cataract Dam in 2010

The Upper Nepean Scheme was commenced in 1880 after it was realised that the Botany scheme was insufficient to meet Sydney's water supply needs. The scheme was estimated to be capable of supplying the needs of a population up to 540,000. In 1902, a severe drought caused the water in Prospect Reservoir to fall below gravitational flow to the Lower Canal, resulting in a serious water shortage for Sydney's 523,000 inhabitants.

The seriousness of the position led the NSW Government, in March 1902, to appoint a Royal Commission to inquire into and report upon the Sydney water supply system. The main recommendation of the Commission was that a storage dam be constructed at a point below the junction of Cataract Creek with the Cataract River. The site was selected as a result of a joint investigation and survey by the staff of the Public Works Department and the Water Board. The survey reports proposed the construction of a dam capable of impounding approximately 7000 million gallons of water, with the option of raising the walls at some future time to allow for the catchment of up to 83,000 megalitres; 22 billion US gallons (83,000 ML).

The Act authorising the construction of the dam was passed in 1902 and provided for a wall of 49 metres (160 ft) with a storage capacity of 83 gigalitres; 22 billion US gallons (83,000 ML). By June 1903, much of the area to be submerged had been cleared of timber, with excavations for the foundations having begun by the end of the year.

The contract for the work was let to Messrs Lane and Peters and, by 1905, was well underway with a completion date expected within two years. The contract was for a dam 46 metres (150 ft) high from the natural flow of the river, which would store up to 97,340 gigalitres; 25,714 billion US gallons (21,411×10^{9} imp gal). During construction, the Minister for Public Works, in a measure of economy, directed that the dam wall be reduced in height by 1.2 metres (4 ft) thereby reducing the storage capacity from 83,000 to 94,000 megalitres; 22 to 25 billion US gallons (83,000 to 94,000 ML). The Board however, acting on advice of its President, urged the Minister to have the dam built to its original dimensions. This request was then forwarded to a Royal Commission which, after a full investigation, recommended that the dam be built to its full height and capacity. The work proceeded on this basis and was completed toward the end of 1907 for a total cost of $658,272 and was transferred to the Board on 10 June 1908. The reservoir was filled to capacity for the first time on 13 January 1911, at which time it became obvious that the spillway should be widened to avoid any risk of flood waters overtopping the wall. This work was completed in 1915.

In December 2016 the state government gave approval for the controversial South 32 Dendrobium coal mine, in the Metropolitan Special Area, created to protect the waters of Cataract, Cordeaux, Avon and Nepean Reservoirs.

== Description ==
The Cataract Dam is built of cyclopean masonry composed of sandstone blocks, weighing from 1.8 to 4.1 tonnes; 1.8 to 4.0 long tons (2 to 4.5 short tons), quarried at the site and bedded in a cement mortar. The vertical joints were filled with basalt or sandstone concrete. The upstream face consisted of basalt concrete moulded blocks set in a cement mortar. The downstream face was of basalt concrete, 2 metres (6 ft) thick in the lower section and 1 metre (3 ft) thick in the upper levels. There were two lines of 122-centimetre (48 in) diameter pipes which passed through the dam and discharged water into the river. The flow is now controlled by an AGE Ring Faulkner valve. There is also a Ring Faulkner Gate Valve and a Fixed Crane Dispersion Valve.

The dam wall was given a decorative finish. The upstream parapet was castellated with sandstone blocks, whilst the top of the downstream wall was corbelled in concrete. Near the centre of the dam wall stands the valve house, finished in sandstone ashlar masonry. It has a slate clad, hipped roof featuring ridgecap finials and with parapet gable ends on the north and south sides and segmental arched parapets on the east and west sides.

Specifications for Cataract Dam:

- Date of construction: 1902 - 1907.
- Masonry in wall and spillway: 113,154 cubic metres (148,000 yd^{3}).
- Length of dam: 247 metres (811 ft).
- Length of by-wash: 209 metres (684.5 ft).
- Width at base: 48 metres (156 ft).
- Width at crest: 5 metres (16.5 ft).
- Greatest depth of water: 46 metres (150 ft).
- Full supply level: 290 metres (950 ft) AHD.
- Area of lake: 851 hectares (2,104 acres).
- Capacity: 97.19 gigalitres; 25.67 billion US gallons (97,190 ML).

The water from Cataract Dam is discharged as required into the Cataract River downstream to Broughton's Pass. There it is diverted by another weir into Cataract Tunnel, 2 miles (3.2 km) long, (the first structure of the Upper Canal) by which it is conveyed to Prospect Reservoir.

Associated with the Dam is the Cataract Dam Official Quarters, situated close to the dam wall at the northern end. This single-storey, Federation Queen Anne style house was built in 1910 for the use of Water Board staff during construction of the dam. It is built of ashlar sandstone masonry quarried on the site and features a verandah at the front with elaborate timber posts with curved quadrant brackets, a vertical slatted balustrade and pediment gable over the main entrance way. When built, the house contained a board room, offices, four bedrooms and a kitchen. Over the years, it has provided accommodation for inspecting officers and important visitors. It is still used by SCA and can now provide sleeping accommodation for twelve people. It is open to the public for holiday rental. The gardens around the house are landscaped lawns with garden beds edged with sandstone. Also made of sandstone is a detached garage, refurbished and converted to a conference hall. There are two amenity blocks, also of sandstone masonry featuring castellated parapets and a tennis court stands at the rear of the lawn. Surrounding the garden is a castellated sandstone fence with decorative entrance posts.

A further three sandstone cottages are located to the east of the Dam. These staff cottages were built to identical designs with minor detail differences and have corrugated-iron clad, multi-gabled roofs. There is a substantial brick house dating from the 1950s/60s located between the cottages and the Official Quarters, which is single-storied with a terracotta tiled hipped and gabled roof. It is a simple bungalow form with timber casement and sash windows and has a separate garage with attached living quarters at the rear of the main building.

The public area surrounding the dam is maintained and a large picnic area, shelter sheds, fireplaces and playground area are provided amongst attractive gardens. The site contains many intact elements of the early 20th century landscape design scheme (1910s-1920s?): walling; ornamental gardens (layout and plantings - including Cryptomeria, Stenocarpus, Cupressus, Pinus, Podocarpus, Liquidambar, Jacaranda and Phoenix); structures, especially those echoing aspects of the dam wall parapet construction (e.g. castellated walling elsewhere on site and gate piers); various residences & associated gardens; garden structures such as the cement faux-log bridge near the dam wall; various sculpted cement grottoes; and propagation structures doubling as bush-houses and/or greenhouses. In the broader landscape context, the visual catchment associated with the site is extensive and scenically impressive.

The Conservation Management Plan outlines the key elements and their individual significance assessments.

=== Condition ===
As at 21 January 2009, the condition of the dam is good. The Cataract Dam has a very high level of integrity, with most of its original staff residential cottages and the Official Residence. Many elements of the original landscaping of the site are still apparent however the richness and detail of the original garden plantings have been lost over the last few decades.

=== Modifications and dates ===
- 1940 - Torpedo Booms were installed.
- 1962 - The Upper Valve House was rebuilt.
- 1987 - Wall strengthened by installation of post-tensioned anchors.
- The original Larner Johnson Needle Valve has been replaced with an AGE Ring Faulkner Valve.
- Spillway and dam upgraded for dam safety purposes in 1981 and 1989.

=== Further information ===
Cataract Dam is located in Wollondilly and Wollongong LGAs.

== Heritage listing ==
As at 21 January 2009, Cataract Dam was the first of the four water supply dams built as part of the development of the Upper Nepean Water Supply Scheme, one of the most important engineering works and items of public infrastructure in Australia. Cataract Dam was designed by engineers of the Public Works Department under direction of two of Australia's leading water supply engineers, L.A.B. Wade, Chief Engineer for Water Supply and Sewerage and E.M. De Burgh, who was Supervising Engineer.

The completion of Cataract Dam was a significant step in the continuing process of providing a reliable water supply for Sydney and surrounding areas and was part of a process of development of the Upper Nepean Scheme which was envisaged when that Scheme was designed in the 1880s. Cataract Dam was the largest dam constructed in NSW at the time and was considered to be a significant work of engineering in its day. It continues to play an important role as a major source of water supply for the Sydney area. Additionally, the Cataract Dam is a handsome, well proportioned structure with strong Tudor style architectural character which complements the monumental nature of the structure and its attractive natural surroundings.

Cataract Dam includes a range of ancillary structures which form components of the overall site, including a set of handsome sandstone masonry residential cottages for operational staff (which appear to date from the construction of the dam). They are representative of their age and type.

The Official Quarters is a particularly fine example of a Federation Queen Anne Bungalow, with matching outbuildings and landscaped gardens and is associated with the accommodation of both the senior engineers of the Public Works Department and the Governor of NSW at the opening of the Dam. The Residential Engineers Cottage is also a fine quality building dating from the 1960s.

The Dam surrounds include remnants of its early 20th century gardens, evidence of a high level of landscape design awareness through its planning and detailing, and extensive areas of bushland. Individual components of its remnant gardens, such as its main (upper level) grotto shelter and ornamental follies, are rare in NSW on account of their imaginative conception and quality of craftsmanship. The extensive scale of the remnant area of public parklands is notable and that they continue to attract regular visitation since their opening indicates that the place is highly regarded. The immediate environment around the dam wall - including the key engineering structures and associated architecture, the upstream body of water, the downstream gorge and surrounding vegetation - forms a localised cultural landscape of scenic distinction.

Cataract Dam was listed on the New South Wales State Heritage Register on 18 November 1999 having satisfied the following criteria.

The place is important in demonstrating the course, or pattern, of cultural or natural history in New South Wales.

Cataract Dam is located within the Upper Nepean Catchment Area which has developed with the completion of the Cataract and Nepean tunnels in 1888 as the fourth source of water supply for Sydney. The potential of the Upper Nepean Catchment Area to supply water was fully developed through the construction of four major dams between 1903 and 1936. Cataract Dam is the first of these dams to have been completed. The Upper Nepean Catchment Area continues to supply the regions of Sydney and the Illawarra, with Cataract Dam providing a supply to the Sydney Region.

Cataract Dam was the first of the major water supply dams constructed in NSW. The completion of the dam necessitated the introduction of methods of construction hitherto unseen in NSW in regard to dam engineering. The practices of construction developed at Cataract Dam set the pattern for the completion of all subsequent dams in NSW up to the late 1940s.

Up until the completion of Cordeaux Dam in 1926, the impounded water of Cataract Dam provided the main reserve source of water for domestic and industrial consumption in metropolitan Sydney, the largest city in NSW. In providing water for metropolitan Sydney during this era the dam, in ensuring security of supply, contributed to the extensive residential, commercial and industrial development of Sydney during the first decades of the twentieth century.

The place has a strong or special association with a person, or group of persons, of importance of cultural or natural history of New South Wales's history.

The design and construction of Cataract Dam was undertaken by the Water Supply and Sewerage Branch and Harbour and Rivers Branch of the NSW Public Works Department. The construction of the dam necessitated the dedication of the knowledge and experience of a number of the engineers employed in the branches at the time including Cecil W. Darley (NSW inspecting engineer in London), Leslie A.B. Wade (principal engineer - Water Supply and Sewerage Branch), Henry H. Dare and Ernest de Burgh (supervising engineers). The successful completion of the dam and its continuation of use as a water supply dam are lasting testament to the professional capabilities of the late Victorian/Edwardian era generation of engineers in the Public Works Department. The association of Thomas W. Keele with the initial dam proposal, and the subsequent problems associated with the cost and the ongoing Royal Commissions into the project was immortalised through Banjo Patterson's poem "The Dam that Keele Built".

The Manor was purpose built in 1910 as the quasi-private domain of the Board members of the Water Board. The building and its grounds have particular associations with past identities of the Board.

The island and the inlets of Lake Cataract are associated with past identities of the Water Board through memorialisation of their surnames. A well known example is Keele Island named after Thomas William Keele, the president of the former Metropolitan Board of Water Supply and Sewerage at the time of the dam's construction.

The place is important in demonstrating aesthetic characteristics and/or a high degree of creative or technical achievement in New South Wales.

The wall of Cataract Dam is an engineering work imbued with a sense of high aesthetic values expressed through a well proportioned high and straight wall set within the gorge of the Cataract River.

The design and finishes of the crest house, albeit substantially reconstructed c.1953, parapet and abutments were undertaken by the Government's Architect Branch of the Department of Public Works, at the time under Walter Liberty Vernon. It exhibits stylistic traits which evoke the era of its construction and impart a park-like appearance to the dam.

The Manor, completed in 1910, is dramatically set within the platform of the cableway and quarry used in the construction of the dam. The sense of elevation and axial relationship to the wall is accentuated by the adjoining drive which is flanked by an avenue of Phoenix palms and Jacranda and the flight of concrete and stone steps which provide the principal means of access to the wall. There is a high level of design awareness in the planning of the grounds and the association with the Botanic Gardens in the layout and selection of species is of considerable note.

The Manor, which is constructed in stone and finished internally to a very high standard, is complemented by four near contemporary stone workmen's family cottages and a 1920s brick resident officer's residence which are equally designed and finished to a high quality.

The dam is set within the valley of the Cataract River: upstream of the dam wall there is a substantial area of native bushland characterised by the broad expanse of the pool of water bordered by the crests of the valley sides and Keele Island. Downstream of the dam wall the setting is characterised by the steeper inclines that graduate into the gorge created by the river's flow over time. The topography in times of high water level imparts a picturesque scene viewed from selective vantage points above and on the dam wall.

The adjoining hill of approach to the dam is laid-out with a plantation of Monterey Pines, which in juxtaposition with the paths, drives, culverts, steps and cottages impart a parklike setting.

The place has a strong or special association with a particular community or cultural group in New South Wales for social, cultural or spiritual reasons.

The dam and grounds are recognised by the National Trust of Australia (NSW) as being a place which is part of the cultural environment of Australia, which has aesthetic, historical, architectural, archaeological, scientific and social significance for future generations, as well as for the present community of NSW.

The dam and grounds are recognised by the Heritage Council of NSW as a place which is of significance to NSW in relation to its historical, scientific, cultural, social, archeological, natural and aesthetic values.

The dam wall is recognised as an engineering feat of national significance by the Institute of the Engineers of Australia.

The place has potential to yield information that will contribute to an understanding of the cultural or natural history of New South Wales.

The grounds of the dam contain a yard of valves removed from Cataract and Woronora Dams, and items of plant and machinery used during the construction and maintenance of the Upper Canal.

The hillside overlooking the dam was the site of the original construction village and retains steps and engravings cut within the rock outcrops dating from this era.

The cyclopean masonry of the dam is a unique example of this type of gravity dam construction and demonstrates the principal characteristics of this technology. The lower valve house completed in 1907and extended in 1913 is a unique early example of its type and demonstrates the principal characteristics of the design of such structures. The water supply system completed in 1907 retains it gallery and rising main chamber in the dam wall, which demonstrate the principal characteristics of the design of such a delivery system.

The grounds of the dam retain numerous tree plantings undertaken from the time of the completion of the dam and Manor in 1910. Collectively the diversity of these trees are an invaluable record of past horticultural practices. Terraces and platforms adjoining the dam abutments demarcate the location of plant used in the construction of the dam, in particular the location of the cableway head tower.

The submerged basin of the reservoir is likely to retain remnant plant and equipment used in the construction of the dam, such as cuttings and terraces of the tramway.

The site of the dam retains a number of known archeological sites which are associated with dam construction and later upgrading of the spillway. These sites include a large curved masonry dam on a tributary of Cataract Creek of the Appin/Bulli Road, a potential stone quarry, the formation of a roadway adjacent to the road of access, powder magazines on Keele Island and on the adjoining west abutment of the dam wall, and fireplaces, horse yard drains and powder magazines on the abutment adjoining the spillway.

The place possesses uncommon, rare or endangered aspects of the cultural or natural history of New South Wales.

Cataract Dam was the first major dam situated within a large water supply catchment area constructed in NSW. Cataract Dam is the oldest large cyclopean masonry dam constructed in Australia, and is believed to have been the largest works of its kind at the time of completion in the Southern Hemisphere.

The straight cyclopean masonry wall is unique within the context of other large cyclopean masonry dams constructed in NSW.

The lower valve house (completed in stages up to 1915) is the earliest and largest structure of its type constructed in NSW. The screen tower (completed in 1907) is the earliest structure of its type constructed in NSW, and includes unique water intake system. The crest house and valve tower retain unique penstock gate and operating gear (capstan, connecting shafts and gate) unique examples of this type of machinery of NSW.

The terraces used in construction of the dam represent the first of their type in NSW and are associated with a number of technological innovations such as the first cableway used in NSW. The plant and equipment used in the construction was electrically driven, which was unique in NSW in regard to the date, extent of the installation and remoteness.

The dam retains items of ironwork which are part of the original water delivery system, which are unique in NSW in regard to this date.

The building of the dam represents a unique episode in the history of NSW in being the subject of a number of Royal Commissions made into the building and cost of the project. The Commissions are likely to have influenced the method of construction of later dams.

The latter stages of the construction of Cataract Dam was completed by the contractors Lane and Peters. Cataract Dam is the only cyclopean masonry dam designed by the Public Works Department but completed under contract.

Cataract Dam is arguably the most decorative of all the major dams constructed in NSW in regards to its high standard of rusticated stone finishes on the crest wall, abutments and crest house, the ashlar pattern imparted by the precast concrete blocks on the straight upstream face of the wall, the unadorned functionality of the concrete facing to the inclined downstream face and lower valve house, and the setting of the high straight wall within the landscape of the Cataract River gorge. The crest house and complementary elements such as the articulated arches on the crest wall, in their innate sense of scale and composition, rank with the best of all public works in NSW undertaken in the Federation era.

The site of the construction township situated within the grounds of the picnic area and maintenance men's cottages was the first large temporary camp established for the construction of a dam in NSW.

The Board's former official quarters and surrounds are unique within the context of dams on NSW and rare within the context of other government institutions of the federation era.

The four stone workmen's cottages constructed in 1912, and the 1929 brick officer-in-charge's residence, consciously sited on the hillside overlooking the dam wall, impart a village-like appearance which is unique within the context of dams in NSW.

The four stone maintenance men cottages are likely to be rare, within the context of a non-urban environment, Federation era example of model working men's houses.

The grounds of the dam contain an early 36 inch (0.9) diameter gate valve (manufacture not known) which was used to regulate the outlet flow of water which is considered the only extant example of such a valve in NSW.

The upgrading works to the spillway and dam between 1981 and 1989 to make the dam meet modern day safety requirements were undertaken in consideration of the unique heritage significance of the dam in NSW ensuring no visual impact on the dam, a milestone in remedial engineering works on this scale.

The place is important in demonstrating the principal characteristics of a class of cultural or natural places/environments in New South Wales.

Cataract Dam is representative of a type of dam (cyclopean masonry gravity dam) constructed in NSW by the Water Supply and Sewerage Branch of the Public Works Department during the first half of the twentieth century. Key representative attributes of the dam's design and construction include the use of cyclopean masonry bedded in sandstone concrete, use of blue metal concrete facing, use of a spillway offset from the gravity wall, valve crest house attractively designed and finished to a high standard.

The upgrading of the valves within the dam wall and ancillary monitoring and operating equipment is representative of the modern day safe operating practice.

The construction technologies used at Cataract Dam came to be the norm for all subsequent dams constructed in NSW well into the twentieth century. Key representative attributes of the dam's construction techniques include the use of cableways, the building of temporary camps to house labourers and tradesman, building of semi permanent cottages to house salaried staff, the construction of terraced platforms to house plant and machinery, mechanisation of concrete production, the use of a purpose built tramway to transport raw materials from their source to the construction site, the construction of a purpose built road of access to transport men, supplies and materials from the nearest railhead to the construction site, the building of permanent infrastructure such as water supply for plant and residences, the use of electricity to power plant and equipment.

The rehabilitation of tracts of land scarred in the construction process employed at Cataract Dam through beautification works, is representative of practices undertaken at other dams throughout NSW. Key representative attributes of this practice include utilising the former camp as a picnic area, utilising the former terraced construction platforms as picnic areas and lookouts, and utilising the former construction roads for vehicular access to the dam site and wall.

The practice of ongoing maintenance of the Cataract Dam wall after by resident staff and workshop facilitates is representative of procedures that were undertaken at other dams and weirs constructed prior and after Cataract.

The provision of public amenity at the dam site is representative of the use of large water supply and irrigation dams in NSW as places for recreation by the greater community.

== Engineering heritage ==
The is listed as a National Engineering Landmark by Engineers Australia as part of its Engineering Heritage Recognition Program.

== See also ==
- List of reservoirs and dams in New South Wales
- Sydney Water
- Shoalhaven Scheme
- Upper Canal System
