= Windmill Hill, Appin =

Windmill Hill
- Location within New South Wales Location within Australia
- 34°13′10″S 150°46′58″E
- Location: Wilton Road, Appin, Wollondilly Shire, New South Wales, Australia

History
- Built: 1820–1950

Site notes
- Owner: Water NSW

New South Wales Heritage Register
- Official name: Windmill Hill Group, including Ruins; North Farm; Middle Farm aka Larkin Farm and Windmill Hill; South Farm; Steven's Homestead
- Type: State heritage (built)
- Designated: 27 June 2014
- Reference no.: 1931
- Type: Agriculture
- Category: Farming and Grazing

Windmill Hill is a heritage-listed former farm and now water catchment area located at Wilton Road in the outer south-western Sydney settlement of Appin in the Wollondilly Shire local government area of New South Wales, Australia. It was built from 1820 to 1950. It is also known as Windmill Hill Group, including Ruins, North Farm, Middle Farm aka Larkin Farm and Windmill Hill, South Farm and Steven's Homestead. The property is owned by Water NSW (State Government). It was added to the New South Wales State Heritage Register on 27 June 2014.

== History ==
=== Appin ===
Appin town's name came about, despite that most local settlers came from Irish stock, due to Governor Macquarie's arrival in the colony in 1810. At the time, Government House was in Parramatta and one of Macquarie's first intentions was to travel into the nearby country to discover the best land from which the colony could be provided with food. It was already known that the most productive area for that purpose was the Hawkesbury River country, but these districts had proven precarious because of severe flooding which caused great losses in crops and stock.

The land Macquarie intended to study lay between the Nepean and Georges Rivers. There had been no identification of the land which ran as far south as the Cataract River and was bounded on the west by the Nepean River and on the east by the Georges River. On completion of his survey, this area reminded him so much of his own (home) district in Scotland that he called it the Airds district. Some time later he named the section south, including Mount Gilead, Appin.

One of the earliest buildings in the town, still standing, is the Anglican school, where the first generation of children born in Appin received their education. This was erected about 1815.

Macquarie gave many grants of land in order to develop the land. The first was 400 hectares (1,000 acres) granted to Sydney magistrate and acting commissary-general, William Broughton. There were several other grants of smaller amounts, made on condition that after five years, unless sufficient progress had been made in cropping and stocking, the land would revert to the Crown. The district became a great supplier of wheat, corn and barley, carried to Sydney by wagons pulled by teams of bullocks or horses.

The northern boundary of the Appin district is the property known as Mount Gilead, which was granted to Reuben Uther. Some years later it was purchased by a Sydney businessman, Thomas Rose, who was credited with building the first dam for water conservation in the colony (here). This was carried out very thoroughly and with great expense. He was generous with the water conserved and allowed his neighbours to water their stock in very dry times.

He applied to the Governor for some reimbursement, but was refused. This dam was built in 1824. In 1836 Rose built the huge stone windmill, one of the largest of its kind which gave great service for many years grinding wheat of the surrounding areas. In those early years, in a good season, yields in some areas were as high as 45 bushels to the acre. The windmill is still standing; that is the four storey tower which has long been converted to a water tank; but the top hammer and sails have long-since disappeared.

On the southern side, Mount Gilead was joined by the Hume (family) properties, Beulan and Meadowvale (formerly Rockwood). These and others such as Fairview, Blossom Lodge, Mount Carlon and the big poultry farm conducted by Ingham enterprises are all on the western side of the Appin Road. Opposite the last property is one known as Kildare, one of the pioneer homes of the Irish Dwyer family.

Further west was Lesson's Green, an 32-hectare (80-acre) grant to William Crowe, the northern boundary of which joined a 40-hectare (100-acre) grant to John Dwyer, which in turn joined Macquarie Dale, a second grant of 280 hectares (700 acres) made to William Broughton in 1816, which ran as far (west) as the Nepean River. South of this is the property of Elladale, of 510 hectares (1,250 acres) granted to Alexander Riley in 1812, the boundary to Macquarie Dale (of which) is Elladale Creek. This was later greatly reduced in size by subdivisions and sales. By about 1840, when purchased by Rev. Sparling, the first incumbent at St. Mark's Anglican Church in Appin, it had shrunk to 240 hectares (600 acres).

On its southern boundary, it was joined by Broughton's 40-hectare (100-acre) Lachlan Vale, the first land grant in the area. That property in turn joined John Kennedy's original 160-hectare (400-acre) grant, that he named Teston. In later years, different owners added to it, growing the property to over 400 hectares (1,000 acres). This acreage on the south side joined the area known as Mount Brittain of 180 acres, a grant to William Sykes. With further grants it became over 120 hectares (300 acres).

Further south, Mount Brittain joined a 20-hectare (50-acre) grant to James Jordan, the southern boundary being the Cataract River and here was the place known as Jordan's Crossing, where the road from Mount Keira (now Picton Road) crossed the river. There were a number of small 20-hectare (50-acre) grants on the way back to Appin such as those of John Firth, Edward McGee, John Trotter, Nicholas Bryan and Matthew Pearce (40 hectares (100 acres)) and several others. Laurence D'Arcy was also granted 77 hectares (190 acres) joining Jordan's and named it Spring Valley.

Other grantees were James Byrne, 120 hectares (300 acres) and Andrew Byrne who had a grant between what is now Ingham enterprises and John Anderson's property that he named Ousedale, the creek that ran through it still bearing this name. A number of the small grants were brought together by purchase and the well-known property of Windmill Hill came into being, owned by William Larkin. This name was given to it because Larkin built a timber windmill on the highest part of it (about the mid-1840s) and it gave great service for many years. The farm later became the property of the Winton family who ran it as a dairy farm until recent years.

=== Windmill Hill ===
North Farm was granted to Moses and Michael Brennan in 1816. The small size of the grant indicates that the land was suitable for grain production. A notice appears in the Sydney Gazette of January 1822 requesting Moses and Michael Brennan of Appin to supply wheat for the NSW Government stores. Members of the Brennan family owned the property up until 1907, during which time the property was adapted for a variety of agricultural activities.

By the 1850s wheat was one of the main agricultural products of the district and a number of mills were constructed in the district. The mill that gave Windmill Hill its name was erected in 1846 by Edward Larkin, a Sussex miller who came to Australia with his wife Jane in 1837. Larkin's mill operated for almost 25 years. The mill's life was ended as a result of the rust virus that had begun to attack the colony's wheat crop east of the dividing range by the 1850s. By the 1870s, the rust virus had all but destroyed wheat production in areas east of the dividing range, where climatic conditions helped the disease to flourish.

South Farm is situated within the boundaries of a 200-hectare (500-acre) grant made to Richard Tress in 1819. It is likely that the land was more suited to grazing than grain production, as it was much larger than that granted to the Brennans. He sold 190 acres to his neighbour on the eastern side, Daniel Miller in 1829. In 1831 Tress sold the rest of his land to WR Tress. Tress in turn sold the land to Matthew and Catherine Healey in 1838. In 1842, after the death of Matthew Healey the property was sold to John Bray.

The property remained in the Bray family until it was sold to Harry Winton in 1884. The Wintons retained the property with only minor changes for 85 years, adding Larkin's to it in 1903.

Harry Winton died in 1921 and the property was left to be run by his sons William and Charles. In 1969 the property was sold to the Windmill Hill Pastoral Company. It is unclear when the property was incorporated into the Metropolitan Catchment Area, although it appears farming ceased in the 1970s. The original land grant was subdivided in the 1990s when the western slope of the site was developed as a water treatment facility.

The Stevens Property is situated on 160 hectares (400 acres) of land originally granted to Daniel Millar on 17 August 1819. It appears that the property was initially used mainly for dairying and has followed a similar land-use patter to that of South Farm. In 1829, Millar purchased a further 190 acres from his neighbour R Tress (South Farm/Windmill Hill). This purchase increased the size of Millar's property to the south and made the creek, previously running through Tress's property the new boundary between the two farms. Little else is known about the property as there is no significant documentary evidence pertaining to the site. It seems the site is locally known after the last occupiers of the site, the Stevens around the mid 20th century.

== Description ==
The Windmill Hill Group, including Ruins, consists of early to mid nineteenth century farm buildings, mostly in ruins, with associated cultural plantings and archaeological remains, in a relatively intact rural setting. Three of the clusters of buildings (North, Middle and South farms) run north–south along a ridgeline running parallel to Winton Road on its eastern side. To the east the land slopes down to a small creek and has been cleared to create paddocks for cropping and grazing. At the southern end of the valley formed by the creek there is an area of remnant native bushland and a stone dam. Steven's Homestead is on the up-slope of the small valley on its eastern side. There are a range of building types represented in the group including stone ashlar, stone rubble, timber slab and weatherboard.

North Farm (Brennan's Farm)

North Farm is 38 hectares (94 acres) granted to Moses and Michael Brennan in 1816. The farm buildings consist of two structures: a former sandstone farm building, which is in ruins and a dilapidated timber slab homestead. It sits in an immediate landscape that retains a nineteenth century character of cleared pasture with the view to the east remaining substantially cleared paddocks and bushland as it would have been in the earliest days of European settlement on the property. It also retains a relationship with the other three farms in the group.

The timber slab building remains in fair condition and recent works have been undertaken to "mothball" the structure (including new roof gutters and downpipes). The structure consists of a main cottage and the remains of a former rear kitchen and laundry. The cottage has a mix of weatherboard, timber slab and corrugated iron clad walls. The gabled roof remains and has been over-sheeted with corrugated iron over timber shingles. Only the brick chimneys of the rear kitchen and laundry remain.

The granary building to the north of the North Farm house is random-coursed, split faced ashlar sandstone construction with dressed quoins and sills. Walls consist of an inner and outer skin, with rubble infill and some through stones to bind both skins. Only the northern and western walls remain partially standing above head height. The western wall has an unusual V-shaped slit halfway up the wall. While this may be a ventilation slit, its position and width has led to local suggestion that it was a fortified structure and the opening is a loophole. There is no evidence of the timber dairy addition, noted in the 2002 CMP (GML). The building is now a ruin.

Middle Farm (Larkin's Farm)

The Middle Farm sits in an immediate landscape that retains a nineteenth century character of cleared pasture with the view to the east over substantially cleared paddocks and bushland as it would have been in the earliest days of European settlement on the property. It also retains a visual relationship with the other three farms in the group.

In 1977 the Middle Farm was described as having rendered stone walls and french doors opening to a wooden verandah in the front. The wooden doorways were described as carefully detailed and the house still had its cedar joinery, with mantelpiece and built-in cupboards each side of the fireplace in the living room.

The extant structure consists of the 3-rooms main rooms with lean-to annexe at the rear. Walls are sandstone laid in regular courses with either a picked or split finish, and there is evidence of previous limewash finishes to the interior and exterior walls. The differing finishes to the sandstone walls indicate that the building was constructed as various stages. The gable roof over the main structure remains, and has been over-sheeted with corrugated iron over original/early timber shingles. The skillion roof over the lean-to is similarly treated, however has partially collapsed. There is no evidence remaining of the interior joinery, including fenestration, mantles or floors. The timber battens and lathes (part) of an early lathe and plaster ceiling within the main rooms remain.

To the rear of the house there are remnant timber posts, stone, brick and corrugated iron from the now collapsed kitchen. In 1977 it was described as a weatherboard kitchen connected to the house by a covered way, with a stone-flagged courtyard between, fenced with wooden slabs.

South Farm

In 1977 a description of the Windmill Hill area describes a ruin of an early house with stone walled rooms at each end of a collapsed timber central part, to the south of Middle Farm. The area immediately to the north of the dairy at South Farm is heavily overgrown and there are a number of introduced shrubs and small trees adjacent to the large brick cistern. It is likely the stone ruin was located in this area.

The former dairy building is a timber framed and corrugated iron clad structure constructed on a concrete base. The majority of the roof and wall cladding remains intact and as such the structure is in a fair condition. Other early elements at the site include a well of masonry construction, remains of a timber post-and-rail fence and remnant orchard plantings to the south-east.

Stevens Homestead

The principal feature of the site is the remains of what appears to have been a sandstone residence now in a ruinous state. The ruin has a rectangular footprint, measuring approx. 15.5m long x 6.7m wide and is constructed of sandstone rubble. The walls are mostly collapsed however would indicate that the residence originally had least six rooms. There is evidence of a plaster finish to the exterior walls, scored to imitate a regular ashlar stone wall. There is evidence of two fireplaces within the stonework.

Sandstock brick remnants around the ruin, would indicate that there were other structures at the site.

=== Condition ===
As at 17 February 2014, the condition of the property is poor. The Windmill Hill Group, comprising the three farms (North, Middle and South Farms) and Steven's Homestead, has a moderate to high level of integrity.

The individual farms composing the Windmill Hill group have the following level of integrity/intactness:

- North Farm (Brennan's Farm) – Moderate to high (architectural quality and archaeological potential)
- Middle Farm (Larkin's Farm) – Moderate (architectural quality and archaeological potential)
- South Farm – Little (architectural quality), Moderate to high (archaeological potential)
- Steven's Homestead – Moderate to high (archaeological potential only)

== Heritage listing ==
As at 28 May 2014, the Windmill Hill Group, including Ruins, has state heritage significance for its ability to demonstrate the pattern of middle level farming and settlement in the Cumberland Plain from the 1820s to the early twentieth century, through its cluster of ruined farm buildings, plantings and archaeological remains within a relatively intact rural setting, including remnant native bushland. When viewed from below the western ridgeline, the few visible elements in the landscape create a strong sense of place and retain the historic setting of the group of farm buildings and their relationship to one another which is increasingly rare as the Cumberland Plain is subjected to development pressure. The rural vernacular character of the various buildings and ruins contributes to the high aesthetic quality of the group. This significance is reinforced through the visual connections between each individual farm across the valley.

The collection of building ruins and landscape features has a high level of significance as they demonstrate varying construction techniques and vernacular styles from the early to late nineteenth century, which have the ability to provide information on the relative construction periods and also the fortunes of the early settlers that occupied them.

Windmill Hill was listed on the New South Wales State Heritage Register on 27 June 2014 having satisfied the following criteria.

The place is important in demonstrating the course, or pattern, of cultural or natural history in New South Wales.

The Windmill Hill group has State historical significance as it demonstrates the pattern of middle level farming and settlement in the Cumberland Plain from the 1820s to the early twentieth century.

The place is important in demonstrating aesthetic characteristics and/or a high degree of creative or technical achievement in New South Wales.

The Windmill Hill Group has State heritage significance at an Aesthetic/Technical level. When viewed from below the western ridgeline, there are few visible modern elements in the landscape, providing a strong sense of place and retaining the historic setting of the group of farm buildings and their relationship to one another. North and Middle farms in particular are distinctive visual elements along the ridgeline.

The rural vernacular character of the buildings contributes to the high aesthetic quality of the group, as does the setting with its combination of cleared paddocks and remnant native bushland. Each farm represents an important component of the overall cultural landscape of the area and each farm reinforces the contribution of the other, strengthened by the visual sightlines between them.

The collection of building ruins and landscape features also has a high level of technical significance as they demonstrate varying construction techniques and vernacular styles from the early to late nineteenth century.

The stone dam, which appears to date from the early to mid nineteenth century, has technical significance, despite its partially collapsed state, as a relatively uncommon example of a substation domestic water supply from this period.

The place has a strong or special association with a particular community or cultural group in New South Wales for social, cultural or spiritual reasons.

The social significance of the Windmill Hill Group has not been formally assessed through community consultation, but it has no known strong or special association with a particular community or cultural group. It may have significance for the descendants of the first settlers on this property, but this attachment does not meet the thresholds for significance under this particular criterion.

The place has potential to yield information that will contribute to an understanding of the cultural or natural history of New South Wales.

The Windmill Hill Group has moderate to high archaeological research potential and therefore state heritage research significance. Each homestead site has the potential to provide information about early settlement within the southern limits of the Cumberland Plain that is not available from other sources. This includes evidence of agricultural practices such as cropping, milling and water management as well as domestic life for the middle class settlers of the area. The construction of the granary (sandstone) at North Farm has particular significance under this criterion for its ability to inform of the importance of storing and securing grain in the early nineteenth century. The combination of construction techniques utilised for the various buildings and ruins has the potential to provide information on the different construction periods for the collection, as well as the relative fortune of the early settlers that occupied these properties.

The research potential of the group is increased by the number of possible sites available for investigation within a small geographic area

The place possesses uncommon, rare or endangered aspects of the cultural or natural history of New South Wales.

The Windmill Hill Group has state rarity significance as an unusual surviving group of early to mid-nineteenth century farm building ruins, plantings and archaeological remains in a largely intact rural landscape. When viewed from below the ridgeline the group maintains its historic setting with few modern visual intrusions. This is extremely unusual in the Cumberland Plain. While there are a number of other surviving farms from this period in the Cumberland Plain region, many from grants made by Governor Macquarie, the number of farms within the group is also unusual as many early landscapes of this nature have been subdivided. The relatively intact relationship of the four farms within their landscape setting adds to the rarity of the group as does the fact they are from middle level farming activity. Many of the other surviving early colonial homesteads are larger properties by notable architects or with connections to the landed gentry and are single farm sites.

The Pinups radiate at Middle Farm, which appears to be up to 130 years old, is a rare surviving, early example of its kind in NSW. The stone dam may be a particularly early and rare example of a domestic water supply from the early nineteenth century.

The ruin of the granary building at North Farm is unusual in that it appears to have a loophole or gun slit in the remaining section of the western wall. Although this can't be proven, if it is evidence of a fortified agricultural building this would be rare in a State context.

The place is important in demonstrating the principal characteristics of a class of cultural or natural places/environments in New South Wales.

The differing construction techniques utilised for the various buildings and ruins are good representative examples of other similar vernacular structures from the early nineteenth century and reflect the "make do" nature of the early settlers.
