= Picton Road =

Highway in New South Wales, Australia

Picton Road New South Wales
- Coordinates: 34.169441°S 150.611371°E (West end); 34.365234°S 150.859184°E (East end)

General information
- Type: Road
- Length: 37.1 km (23 mi)
- Gazetted: August 1928 as Main Road 179); May 1970 (as Trunk Road 95)
- Route number(s): B88 (2013–present) (Wilton–Cataract)
- Former route number: State Route 88 (1974–2013) Entire route; Concurrency: State Route 56 (1974–2013) (Picton–Maldon)

Major junctions
- West end: Remembrance Drive; Picton, New South Wales
- Hume Motorway
- East end: Princes Motorway; Cataract, New South Wales

Location(s)
- Major suburbs: Wilton

Picton Road is a 37-kilometre (23 mi) rural road that links Picton and Wollongong through the Macarthur region of New South Wales. It provides an important link between the Hume and Princes Motorways.

== Route ==
Picton Road starts with from the intersection with Old Hume Highway (Remembrance Drive) in Picton, then heads in a south-easterly direction, rossing the Nepean River and then Hume Motorway and continues over grass-forested ranges east of Wilton (passing through Sydney Water Catchment areas) until it ends at the intersection with Mount Ousley Road (Princes Motorway) in the southern fringes of Cataract.

== History ==
The passing of the Main Roads Act, 1924 through the Parliament of New South Wales provided for the declaration of Main Roads, roads partially funded by the State government through the Main Roads Board (later the Department of Main Roads, and eventually Transport for NSW). Main Road No. 179 was declared on 8 August 1928 from Campbelltown via Maldon and Wiltin to Appin. With the passing of the Main Roads (Amendment) Act, 1929 to provide for additional declarations of State Highways and Trunk Roads, this was amended to Main Road 179 on 8 April 1929. A branch of Main Road 179 was extended from Maldon to the intersection with Hume Highway in Picton on 14 December 1938. Main Road 502 was declared on 16 August 1939, from the intersection with Main Road 179 near Wilton to Mount Keira.

Trunk Road 95 was declared on 27 May 1970, from the intersection with Hume Highway in Picton via Maldon, Wilton and Mount Ousley to the intersection with Princes Highway in North Wollongong, subsuming Main Road 502 and the alignment of Main Road 179 between Picton and Wilton; as a result Main Road 179 was truncated at Menangle. The western end of Trunk Road 95 was truncated the interchange with South-Western Freeway (today Hume Motorway) on 24 October 1984; the eastern end of Main Road 612 was extended along the former alignment from the freeway interchange to Picton (and continuing west via Mowbray Park to Oakdale).

The passage of the Roads Act of 1993 updated road classifications and the way they could be declared within New South Wales. Under this act, the western end of Main Road 612 was truncated to end at Picton on 27 November 2009; Main Road 468 was declared along its former alignment from Picton to Mowbray Park. Picton Road today, as part of Main Roads 95 and 612, still retains these declarations.

Picton Road was signed State Route 88 across its entire length, with State Route 56 concurrent from Picton to Menangle, in 1974. With the conversion to the newer alphanumeric system in 2013, this was replaced with route B88 from the interchange with Hume Motorway to the interchange with Princes Motorway (with the rest of the road to Picton left unallocated).

== Major intersections ==
LGA	Location	km	mi	Destinations	Notes
Wollondilly	Picton	0.0	0.0	Remembrance Drive – Bargo, Camden	Western terminus of road
Wollondilly	Razorback	5.2	3.2	Menangle Road – Menangle, Campbelltown	
Wollondilly	Razorback	6.4	4.0	Main Southern railway line	
Nepean River		6.8	4.2	Bridge over the river (Bridge name not known)	
Wollondilly	Wilton	9.9	6.2	Hume Motorway (M31) – Appin, Campbelltown	Western terminus of route B88
Wollondilly	Wilton	12.8	8.0	Almond Street, to Wilton Road – Liverpool, Berrima	
Wollondilly	Wilton	16.2	10.1	MacArthur Drive – Douglas Park	
Wollongong	Cataract	33.7	20.9	Mount Keira Road – Mount Keira	
Wollongong	Cataract	37.1	23.1	Princes Motorway (M1) – Heathcote, Wollongong, Shellharbour	Eastern terminus of road and route B88
1.000 mi = 1.609 km; 1.000 km = 0.621 mi: Route transition

== See also ==
- Appin Road
- List of New South Wales highways
- List of Australian highways
