= Wilton, New South Wales =

Wilton
- Town
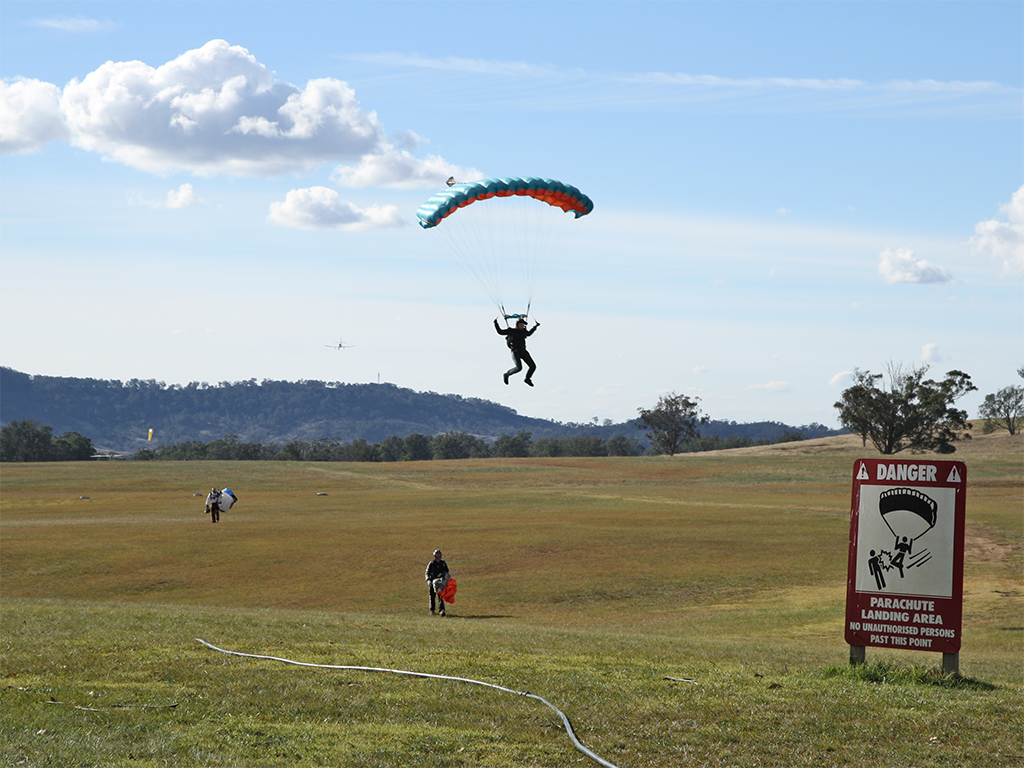
- Sydney Skydivers

- Coordinates: 34°14′S 150°42′E
- Country: Australia
- State: New South Wales
- Region: Macarthur
- LGA: Wollondilly Shire
- Location: 80 km (50 mi) from Sydney CBD; 30 km (19 mi) from Wollongong; 12 km (7.5 mi) from Appin; 37 km (23 mi) from Mittagong

Government
  - State electorate: Wollondilly
  - Federal division: Hume
- Elevation: 203 m (666 ft)

Population
  - Total: 3,080 (2016 census)
- Postcode: 2571
Localities around Wilton
| | Douglas Park | Appin |
| Maldon | Wilton | Cataract |
| Pheasants Nest |

Wilton is a town of the Macarthur Region of Sydney, Australia in the Wollondilly Shire. It is around 80 km south west of the Sydney CBD, within close proximity of Cataract Dam. It is an exurb of Greater Sydney under development, which includes the new estate of Bingara Gorge.

== History ==
After a process that had its origins in the 1970s an intergovernmental group suggested in 1986 that Wilton and Badgerys Creek were preferred sites for a potential second airport of Sydney in the Sydney Basin. The federal government under Bob Hawke selected Badgerys Creek. In April 2012 the then federal Minister for Transport, Anthony Albanese and Qantas CEO Alan Joyce endorsed the suitability of Wilton as a location for a potential second airport of Sydney. On 8 May 2012, with the site selection process still stalled, Anthony Albanese announced further investigations into the Wilton site. The NSW Premier Barry O'Farrell opposed the use of Wilton as an airport. In April 2014 Prime Minister Tony Abbott confirmed approval for the location of Sydney's second airport at Badgerys Creek.

As early as in the 2000s, Lendlease began the development of Bingara Gorge in Wilton. As of early 2023, Wilton has an estimated population of 5,000; its urban planning is divided among four developers, each having signed a Voluntary Planning Agreement to provide infrastructure "at no cost to government". It is expected to grow into a region with a population of 55,000 by 2040.

== Amenities ==
As an exurb under development, Wilton has limited amenities available to its residents. Apart from a primary school, it has a take away, which includes pizza, and opposite thereof is a BP service station. The Bingara Gorge development includes a Chemist, a Woolworths store, a medical centre and pharmacy, a liquor store, two cafes and a Chinese restaurant.

Wilton is just located off Picton Road, which diverges off the Hume Highway to Wollongong. A bus route operated by Picton Buslines, 901, runs through Wilton thrice daily, connects it to Picton railway station and Douglas Park railway station.

== Heritage listings ==
Wilton Park on Wilton Park Road is a heritage-listed farm.

== Sport ==
Hannaford Oval is home to Wollondilly Redbacks Junior Australian Football Club and Wollondilly Knights Senior Australian Football Club. Wilton is also home to the Sydney Skydivers.
