= Wilton Park, Wilton (New South Wales) =

Wilton Park
- Location within New South Wales Location within Australia
- 34°12′45″S 150°38′28″E
- Location: Wilton Park Road, Wilton, Wollondilly Shire, New South Wales, Australia

History
- Built: 1892–

Site notes
- Architect: Albert Bond (attrib.)

New South Wales Heritage Register
- Official name: Wilton Park
- Type: State heritage (landscape)
- Designated: 2 April 1999
- Reference no.: 257
- Type: Homestead Complex
- Category: Farming and Grazing

Wilton Park is a heritage-listed farm located at Wilton Park Road in the south-western Sydney settlement of Wilton in the Wollondilly Shire local government area of New South Wales, Australia. It was possibly designed by Albert Bond and built in 1892. It was added to the New South Wales State Heritage Register on 2 April 1999.

== History ==
The stables group was built about 1892 for Samuel Hordern, grandson of the founder of the firm and the builder of the Palace Emporium, Brickfield Hill, Sydney. Although there is no definite evidence on hand, the architect for the stables group could have been Albert Bond, the Hordern family architect during the period 1876-1910.

Wilton Park became one of the leading horse breeding studs in Australia, contributing significantly to the quality of horses in the colony and producing many winners.

After Samuel Horden's death in 1909, Wilton Park remained in the Hordern family, until sold in 1927.

== Description ==
Sited on gently sloping ground in a formal composition around a central quadrangle. Central to the group is a grassed quadrangle, originally raked gravel. The buildings facing onto the quadrangle are fine examples of rural architecture from a time when stock breeding was an important and developing industry.

The stables group consists of stables, a building containing a coach-house and harness room, underground water tanks, stallion boxes, a covered yard and a quadrangle. The present house built in 1955 is not included in the heritage-listed estate.

Three buildings of the group enclose a quadrangle which was originally of raked gravel (now grass).

The stables building, which faces north and which contains twelve loose boxes, is long and narrow in plan, built of sandstock brick, with a gable roof finished with iron ventilators and decorative fretwork barge boards. Floors vary from perforated plank floors over brick urine drains, to brick paving. In the centre, a gabled opening gives access to paddocks and rolling hills beyond.

Another similar building, facing east, contains the coach house and harness room with a fine original harness cupboard as well as the grooms' room and feed room.

The north side of the quadrangle is formed by two underground water tanks roofed with low hipped roofs and capped with iron ventilators. The original water tank and windmill have been removed.

Two detached stallion boxes, with details similar to the stables face away from the quadrangle.

The covered round year is constructed of posts set in the earth to form a ring about 9 metres (30 ft) in diameter, lined internally with two layers of boarding. Encircling the post tops is a continuous, circular laminated wall plate to form a "parasol", perforated at its apex by an iron ventilator. The collar ties radiate like spokes of a wheel from a central hub and four suspension rods link the hub and the apex. The roof of mitred corrugated iron is fixed to concentric rings of roof battens. room

The buildings are in good condition and were restored in sympathy with the original design in the late 1970s.

== Heritage listing ==
As at 27 March 2012, the Wilton Park stables group which remains much as it was when retailer Samuel Hordern established his thoroughbred horse stud there, has historic significance because it forms a record of a significant part of the activities of a man who was a successful leader in Australian stud stockbreeding as well as a wealthy and successful businessman. The stables were built at a time when the horse was at its peak in Australian agriculture and stockbreeding was a developing skill and these buildings are fine examples of the rural architecture which developed in response to the needs of the bloodstock industry.

The stables group also has aesthetic significance derived from the fact that the individual buildings relate well to each other and to their environment. Their siting on gently rising ground in a formal composition around a central quadrangle creates an impressive vista when seen from the original main eastern approach and from the Wilton Road. Individual buildings are themselves fine examples of rural architecture. In particular, the covered round yard is of rare architectural quality and an excellent example of highly skilled timber craftsmanship. It may have been the model for the brick round yard at Retford Park, Bowral, another former Hordern family property. It also forms an interesting contrast, both visually and in form and materials, with the brick buildings of the group. Of historic, architectural and aesthetic value.

Sited on gently sloping ground in a formal composition around a central quadrangle, the buildings are fine examples of rural architecture from a time when stock breeding was an important and developing Industry.

Wilton Park was listed on the New South Wales State Heritage Register on 2 April 1999.

== See also ==
- Australian residential architectural styles
- Wilton Parish
