= Rachel Henning =

Australian letter writer (1826–1914)

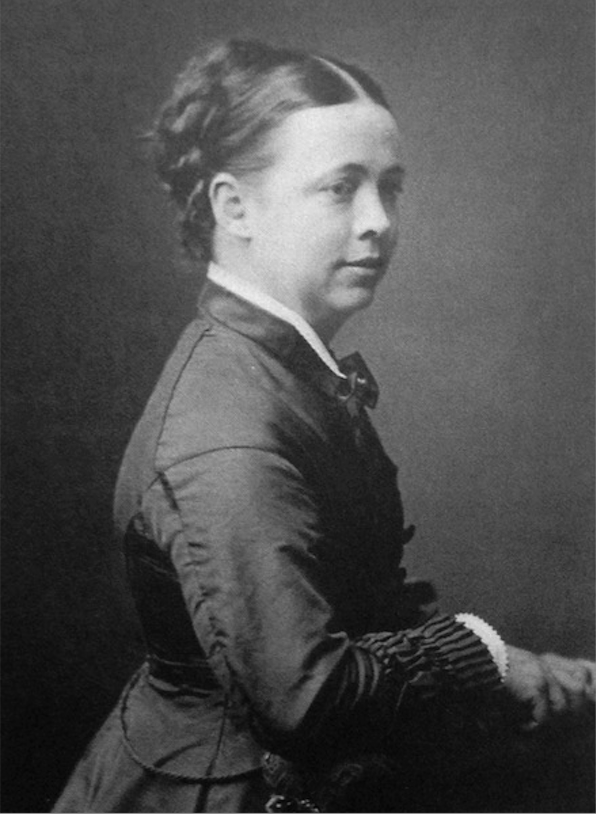
- Born: 29 April 1826 Bristol, England
- Died: 23 August 1914 (aged 88) Hunter's Hill, New South Wales, Australia
- Notable works: The Letters of Rachel Henning
- Spouse: Deighton Taylor (m. 1866; died 1900)

Rachel Henning (29 April 1826 – 23 August 1914) was an English-born Australian woman who achieved posthumous fame for her letters. Born in England in 1826, Henning moved to Australia in 1854 to join her siblings on a farm in Appin. After struggling to adjust to life in Australia, she returned to England in 1856, before rejoining her siblings in Australia. She lived on her brother's sheep station in rural Queensland and eventually found greater satisfaction in Australian life. She left the station to marry in 1866 and settled with her husband on a farm near Wollongong. After the death of their respective spouses, she moved into her brother's home in Sydney, where she died in 1914.

During Henning's life she wrote a large body of letters, primarily to her siblings. In these letters she describes her life in Australia, focusing on ordinary domestic matters like gardening and the management of her household. Her collected letters were acquired by the editor of The Bulletin, David Adams, and were published in the periodical as a serial between August 1951 and January 1952. At least nine editions of the letters have since been published in book form. While Adams' editing of the letters has been criticised by modern scholars, Henning's letters have been described as a valuable historical document that reflects the lives of ordinary nineteenth-century women in the Australian bush.

== Biography ==
Henning was born on 29 April 1826 in Bristol, England, to Charles Wansbrough Henning, a clergyman, and his wife Rachel Lydia (née Biddulph). She had four siblings who survived to adulthood: a brother named Biddulph, and sisters Annie, Amy, and Etta. Their youngest siblings, Henry and Constance, died of scarlet fever in 1841. As the eldest child, Rachel was left as the de facto head of household at the age of nineteen after her father and mother died of tuberculosis in 1840 and 1845 respectively.

Henning's brother Biddulph had been in poor health since surviving the 1841 scarlet fever epidemic that took the lives of his siblings, Henry and Constance, and eventually decided to move to Australia after suffering a lung haemorrhage. In 1853, Biddulph and Annie moved to Sydney, and the following year they were joined by Rachel and Amy. The siblings initially lived on a farm in Appin until Biddulph secured a farm of his own near Bulli. Rachel became homesick and struggled to adjust to her life in Australia. In 1856 she decided to return to England, where she lived with her sister Etta and Etta's husband. In 1861 she returned to Australia.

During Rachel's time in England, Biddulph had relocated to Queensland. Rachel and Annie moved to his station near Bowen the year after her return. She greatly enjoyed life in Queensland on his station, Exmoor. In 1865 Henning left Exmoor and a few months later married Biddulph's overseer, Deighton Taylor. They initially lived near the Myall River, where Taylor worked as the manager of a logging company. They then moved to a farm near Stroud before selling it and moving to a farm near Wollongong in 1872.

In 1896 Rachel moved to Ryde in Sydney, where her husband died in 1900. She and Annie moved in with Biddulph at his home in Hunters Hill after the death of his wife. She died on 23 August 1914 at their home and was buried in the Field of Mars Cemetery.

== Letters ==
=== Contents ===
Henning wrote a large body of letters to members of her family during her lifetime, many of which were collected by her family after her death. The earliest collected letters were written around 1853 and are addressed to Biddulph and Annie following their move to Australia. Most of the letters were written to Etta, who remained in England after Rachel and Amy joined their siblings in Australia in 1854, as well as to Amy, who moved to Bathurst to marry a man named Thomas Sloman the following year. The last letter in the collection was written in Australia in November 1882. The letters describe Henning's daily life, with many of them exploring domestic matters like gardening, fashion, housework, and the management of the household staff. Henning initially expressed intense homesickness, before gradually developing more positive sentiments towards Australian life and the Australian landscape.

=== Publication history ===
After Henning's death, her letters were collected and stored by the Henning family. They were eventually obtained by the editor of The Bulletin, David Adams; how Adams became aware of the letters' existence is unknown. The letters were published in The Bulletin between 8 August 1951 and 16 January 1952, with Adams acting as the series' editor and Norman Lindsay providing pen illustrations. The letters were each around four or five pages in length and were published as a weekly serial.

In 1952 the letters were published by The Bulletin in book form and sold 10,000 copies within a year. The book was reprinted in 1954. The first hardback edition, published by an imprint of Angus & Robertson, appeared in 1963. The letters began to feature heavily in school and university curriculums towards the end of the 1960s following the release of a new paperback edition by Penguin Books. They entered primary school curriculums in the late 1970s following the publication of an abridged schools' edition, newly edited by Ida Veitch. The letters were published in both Australia and the United Kingdom by Penguin Books as part of its "Lives & Letters" series in 1986, alongside a new hardback edition by Angus & Robertson. A new edition was published as part of the Penguin Australian Women's Library series in 1988. As of 2012, The Letters of Rachel Henning was the most-sold collection of letters published in Australia, with nine editions of the letters published in total.

=== Editing criticism ===
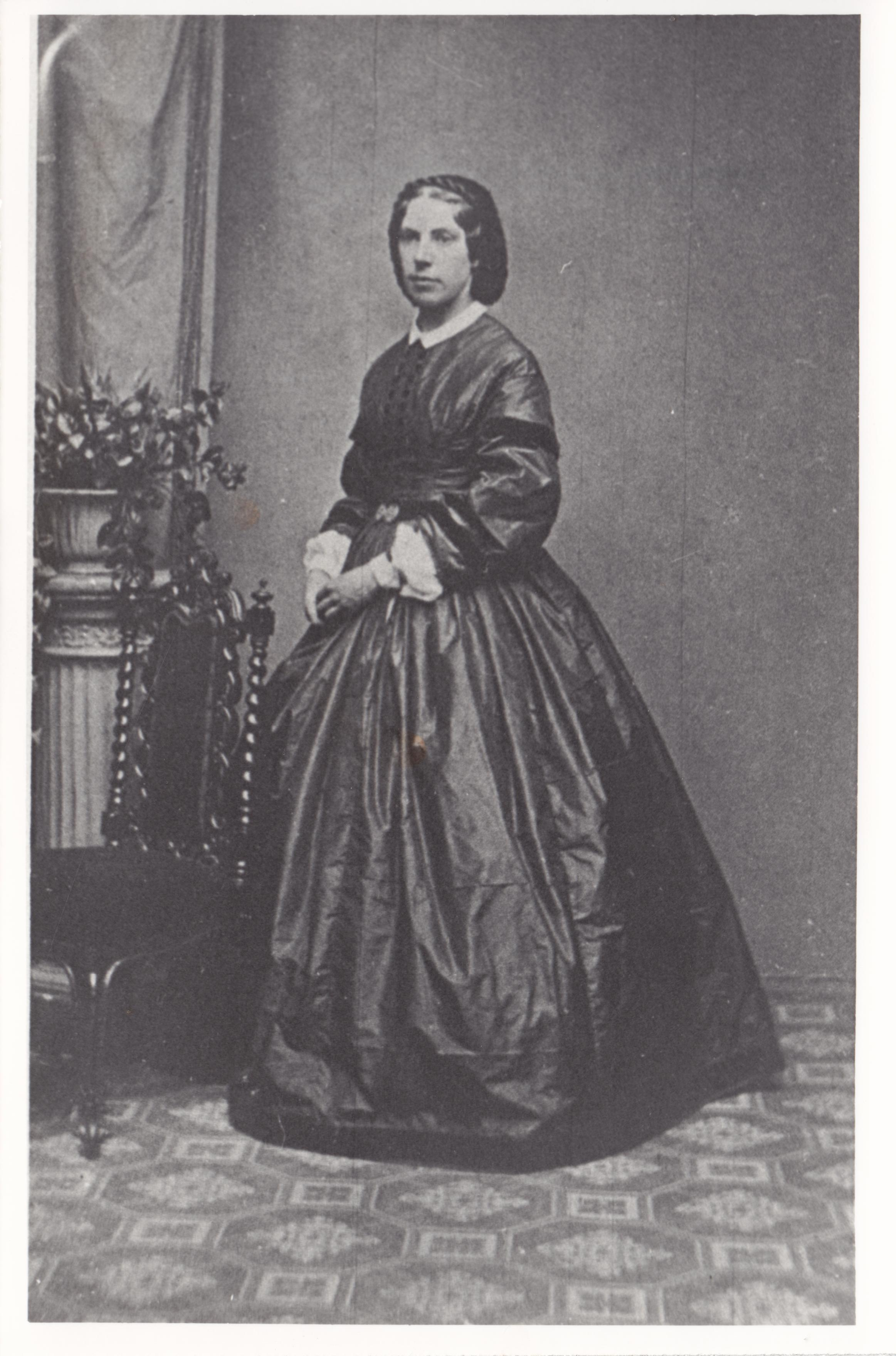
Henning c. 1850

Adams' editing of the letters, which formed the basis for all published editions except the abridged 1979 schools' edition, has been criticised by modern scholars. In 1994, the researcher Anne Allingham published an article in the journal Australian Literary Studies comparing Adams' edited series to the original letters, and concluded that he had been careless in his editing. Adams included only 90 of Henning's 167 microfilmed letters in the series and removed material from some of the letters that he included. In addition to making various stylistic changes, some of which changed the meaning of Henning's writing, Adams often omitted repeated content and passing mentions of mundane details, and removed or shortened Henning's original greetings and farewells to her recipients in order to maintain the letters' pace. Adams did not acknowledge or document these editing practices when publishing the letters. Allingham writes that Adams "deleted, distorted, and defaced" the letters, and that his treatment of the original text "shocks professional historians".

Many descriptions of family conflicts and unflattering comments about those in Henning's life were omitted from the published series. Scholars have suggested that Adams' editing created a softer and more wholesome version of Henning, omitting her sometimes snobbish and blunt comments about those around her, as well as her writing about politics, religion, family disputes, and business dealings. Allingham writes that Adams may have edited out Henning's negative comments about her acquaintances in order to avoid potential legal action by their descendants or in order to avoid causing them offence. In a 2012 article, the editor and publisher Bryony Cosgrove wrote that Allingham's criticism of Adams' editing neglected the role of the Henning family—who still held the copyright over the letters—in omitting parts of their contents out of concern for the family's privacy.

Allingham writes that Adams' editing choices were shaped by his training as a journalist, and that he selected the letters that would best suit his narrative. Cosgrove agrees, writing that the letters were edited to create a nationalist narrative about Henning's eventual change of heart and her embrace of the Australian colony that would appeal to 1950s readers. She writes that Adams' editing was effective in achieving this goal, producing a collection that simultaneously reads "like historical autobiography, like an epistolary novel, and like a collection of authentic letters, seemingly offering the unmediated experience of a nineteenth-century woman", and that this perception of the letters as "candid" and "unadulterated" was key to their appeal. Cosgrove concludes that "Rachel Henning" as she is known today is a character that has been constructed by the Henning family, by Adams and Lindsay, and by the various publishers who have reprinted her letters.

=== Analysis and reception ===
The researcher Dorothy Jones has called Henning's letters an "important historical document" that provides "a wealth of information on pioneering domestic life from a middle-class, Anglo-oriented viewpoint". She writes that the letters are a valuable source of information about elements of women's lives in the Australian bush during Henning's era.

Henning's letters have been described as written from a middle-class, class-bound perspective, and often exhibit a concern for the maintenance of her social status. Henning frequently writes about her "servant problems", and the difficulty of finding suitable staff and maintaining appropriate class boundaries in the Australian context. The letters also reflect her sense of displacement upon her move to Australia. In her early letters, Henning often expresses her dislike of the bush and Australian flowers, and her longing for English wildflowers. However, she eventually develops an appreciation of Australian native flora. Paula Hamilton and Dorothy Jones argue that Henning's gardening represents an attempt to "make the Australian landscape more amenable to herself" and improve her sense of belonging by growing familiar English plants.

While Henning is unlikely to have foreseen the publication of her letters, it was common for letters to be shared within families and forwarded on to others. Scholars argue that Henning's writing displays a consciousness that her letters were likely to be read by a wider audience, and represent a type of autobiographical expression featuring a deliberately constructed self-image. Jones argues that the letters reflect the "fragmented, interrupted quality" of Henning's—and other women's—daily lives, and formed a kind of serial novel for her recipients.
