= Bingara Gorge, New South Wales =

Bingara Gorge
- Coordinates: 34°13′24″S 150°41′15″E
- Country: Australia
- State: New South Wales
- Region: Macarthur
- LGA: Wollondilly Shire

Government
  - State electorate: Wollondilly
  - Federal division: Macarthur
- Postcode: 2571

Bingara Gorge is part of Wilton in the Macarthur Region of Sydney, New South Wales, Australia, in the Wollondilly Shire. The locality is a Country Club style development by Delfin. According to Delfin, Bingara Gorge covers an area 450 hectares which will allow around 1,165 dwellings and home to a population of 3,500 residents. As of July 2022, Bingara Gorge contains facilities for residents use only. The facilities include a gym, a golf shop, 2 tennis courts, a play area and 3 pools, all wrapped around by an 18-hole Graham Marsh designed golf course. A country club will also be built in the near future. The development is said to be completed by 2024.

Bingara Gorge also has a town centre, which contains a small supermarket, Chinese restaurant, bakery, pharmacy & medical centre, nail salon, and liquor store. Bingara Gorge also has a primary school and childcare centre.

In May 2021, Metro Property Development acquired Bingara Gorge from Lendlease.

It is located adjacent to the Hume Highway.
