= Appin, New South Wales =

Appin
- Town
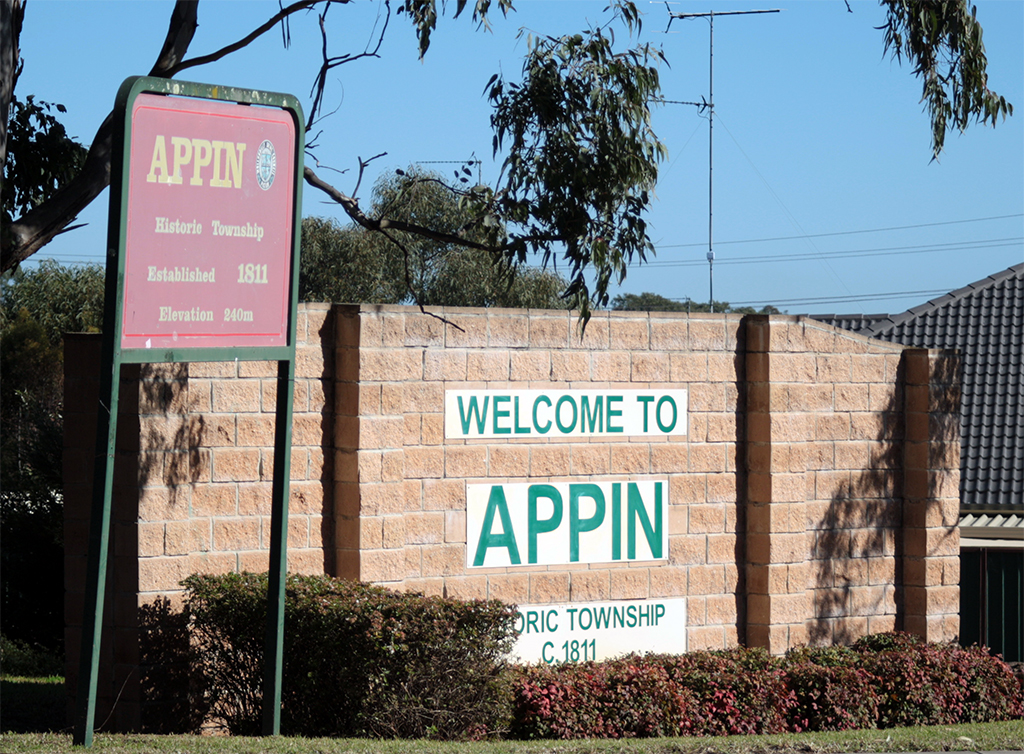
- Northern entry to Appin

- Coordinates: 34°12′S 150°47′E
- Country: Australia
- State: New South Wales
- Region: Macarthur
- LGA: Wollondilly Shire
- Location: 16 km (9.9 mi) south of Campbelltown; 35 km (22 mi) north-west of Wollongong; 75 km (47 mi) south-west of Sydney CBD; 48 km (30 mi) north-east of Mittagong

Government
  - State electorate: Wollondilly
  - Federal division: Hume
- Elevation: 240 m (790 ft)

Population
  - Total: 3,213 (2021 census)
- Postcode: 2560
Localities around Appin
| Menangle | Wedderburn | Helensburgh |
| Douglas Park | Appin | Stanwell Tops |
| Wilton | Cataract | Stanwell Tops |

Appin is a town on the south-west fringe of Sydney in the Macarthur Region, New South Wales, Australia in Wollondilly Shire. It is situated about 16 kilometres (9.9 mi) south of Campbelltown and 35 kilometres (22 mi) northwest of Wollongong.

== History ==
=== Early history ===
Appin is in the lands of the Dharawal people.

"During the Dreaming a great fire swept through the land. Wiritjiribin led the people to sanctuary in a cool green gully which had been missed by the fire, under the rocky cliffs of a gorge south of Appin. Those who had perished in the fire were reincarnated as animals and Wiritjiribin appeared as a lyrebird, which became the clan's totem, a symbol of peace and caretaker of the Land of Gawaigl, an area which became a meeting place for Peoples from all over the east coast of Australia"

European settlement in the Appin district was prohibited for some years; Appin was part of the 'Cowpastures' where a small herd of cattle had established themselves, having escaped from the Sydney Cove settlement. To protect these and help feed the colony, Governor Macquarie ordered 'No person to hunt or travel into the Cowpastures without licence under penalty of death'.

Naturalist George Caley had visited the area in 1807 exploring 'from Prospect to the upper waters of George's River and the Cataract and Cordeaux Rivers' and reporting his findings. Settlement began in 1811 with a 1,000-acre (4.0 km^{2}) land grant by Governor Macquarie to William Broughton, who had arrived with the First Fleet. (Note: Deputy Commissary General W. Broughton: in tribute to the Governor, Broughton named his grant Lachlan Vale; it is now known as Northhamptondale.) For the next five years, smaller grants of 40 to 150 acres (0.61 km^{2}) were made to a score or so of others, former soldiers and emancipated convicts. Governor Macquarie was pleased to give 'The District of Appin' its name, after Appin, in the Scottish West Highlands where his wife, Elizabeth, was born.

Mrs. Allan McPherson, visiting circa 1856, wrote:

"The next morning was fine and bright, and with somewhat better spirits we set out again, but the roads were heavy, and our progress consequently not very rapid, so that it was one or two o'clock before we reached "Appin," a small village, the last resting place on the Sydney side of Mount Keera. As it was too late to attempt crossing the mountain--at all times a formidable undertaking--that evening, we were obliged to make up our minds to stay here. We were not by this time very difficult to please in the way of accommodation, but it seemed doubtful if we should meet with any in this out-of-the-way little place. At last the landlord of a little inn took compassion on us, and let us in, though giving us to understand it was quite as a favour, for he was giving up his business that week, and his house was in a great state of confusion. I afterwards learnt we owed the accommodation, such as it was, to the compassion of the landlord's wife, who chose to weave a little romance about us to the effect that we were a newly married couple, and who was not a little disappointed when I informed her I had been married several years, and had three children! I must be excused if my recollections of Appin are not very favourable, for at this half-dismantled little inn we were detained three days by incessant torrents of rain, such as I had hardly ever witnessed before, even in the colony. What to do with ourselves we really hardly knew. We had neither writing nor drawing materials, nor were they procurable…"

=== The Appin Massacre ===
In March 1816, a punitive expedition of settlers was ambushed at Silverdale by an Aboriginal grouping armed with muskets and spears, who then killed four settlers. Governor Lachlan Macquarie ordered an armed reprisal.

In the early morning of 17 April, Wallis led a surprise attack on this camp, which resulted in the deaths of at least fourteen Aboriginal people. The attack violated Governor Macquarie's instructions to seek the Aboriginals' surrender as "prisoners of war" and to preserve the lives of women and children.

=== Appin mine disaster ===
Occurred approximately 600 metres underground at the Appin coal mine on the night of 24 July 1979, killing 14 people. An explosion that was caused by sparks from a fan control box which ignited a buildup of flammable and poisonous methane gas ripped apart the busiest pit. A subsequent judicial inquiry led to the imposition of stricter safety rules for all mines. It was recommended that automatic devices be installed in mines to give continuous reading of gases, that a special officer supervise ventilation, and that the number of mine inspectors be increased.

== Heritage listings ==
Appin has a number of heritage-listed sites, including:

- Cataract Road, Cataract: Cataract Dam
- Wilton Road: Windmill Hill, Appin

=== Notable citizens ===
Among Appin's free settlers was one Andrew Hamilton Hume, father of the explorer Hamilton Hume. Hamilton Hume and his brother John were tireless investigators of the local countryside, often journeying in the company of Duall, a Dharawal man. Hamilton Hume became an expert bushman, and was well-prepared for major exploration when he set out in 1824 from 'Humewood', in the company of William Hovell, to explore the land between the Sydney settlements and Port Phillip, at the request of Governor Brisbane. (Note: A stone monument to this event stands on Campbelltown Road, erected by the Royal Australian Historical Society in 1924. Stone was obtained from the ruins of Hamilton Hume's house.)

Appin is the birthplace of John Fuller, better known as the bushranger Dan 'Mad Dog' Morgan.

Rachel Henning spent several months at Elladale Cottage in Appin. Of the area, she wrote the following.

I am glad [Biddulph] is going to leave Appin, however, for I am sure he will never make any money on this farm. Do you remember our saying that there must certainly be something the matter with it, when he wrote word of how low the rent was, that there must be a want of water or that nothing would grow? There are both these drawbacks here. The soil is wretchedly poor, and this is said to be the very driest part of Australia. Frequently, when there have been torrents of rain at Wollongong and Sydney, on each side of us, we have not had a drop here. There are no springs on the farm, only a waterhole, and that was dry for nearly six weeks in the summer, and then we had to fetch water from the river three miles off. It is a pity Biddulph ever took this farm; still, he has gained some experience here, and, as his expenditure was chiefly in cattle and furniture, he has not lost much.

=== Agriculture and industry ===
Appin was for decades a major wheat-growing, and dairy-farming area, but wheat rust, and new railways reaching other primary producing areas of the State, reduced its importance. From 1869, however, the district became the major supplier of Sydney's water, when construction commenced on the Upper Nepean Scheme: four major dams and an associated 40 miles (64 km) of canals and tunnels supplying Prospect Reservoir. The Appin Colliery, exploiting the Bulli Seam by longwall mining opened in 1962. The West Cliff Colliery opened in 1976.

=== Infrastructure ===
A town plan was completed in 1834. Several of the proposed street names are in use today, including Toggerai, the Dharawal name for the Upper reaches of the Georges River. A track from Campbelltown was in use from 1815; as settlement advanced along coastal Illawarra, routes to Sydney found their way up the escarpment, and through Appin; the resulting traffic increased the town's prosperity.

Appin had a permanent Post Office by 1841, and a telephone line was connected to it in 1888. Appin had to wait until 1945 for an electricity supply. Despite its proximity to several large dams, Appin did not receive a reticulated water supply until 1961. As of 2010, a town sewerage scheme is in its planning stages.

Several examples of early sandstone buildings remain in Appin's commercial centre on Appin Road. These include the former Courthouse and Gaol (1860s), the derelict Appin Inn (1826), a stone cottage used as offices, built circa 1840, the Headmaster's residence at the primary school, and St. Bede's Roman Catholic Church, 1834–7. Other buildings of heritage value include the disused motor garage at Darcy's Corner (1955), the Appin Hotel (1840), and St Mark The Evangelist Church (1843)

== The town today ==
At the 2021 census, Appin had a population of 3,213.

- Aboriginal and Torres Strait Islander people made up 5.2% of the population.
- 86.1% of people were born in Australia. The next most common country of birth was England at 3.0%.
- 90.3% of people only spoke English at home.
- The most common responses for religion were No Religion 38.1%, Catholic 29.3% and Anglican 18.1%.

=== Community facilities ===
The Wollondilly Mobile Library visits the township weekly. Appin has a Playgroup; a Mobile PreSchool; a Community Hall, two sportsgrounds, and an off-leash area for companion animals near Wonson Oval. The Appin Volunteer Bush Fire Brigade (now known as the Appin Rural Fire Service) was formed in 1944; Joe D'Arcy was its first Captain. The current Fire Shed was opened in 2002.

=== In the surrounding area ===
The 16th World Scout Jamboree was held at the nearby Cataract Scout Camp, the first such Jamboree held in the Southern Hemisphere. Numerous Australian Scout Jamborees have also been held at Cataract Scout Camp.

The Dharawal State Recreation Area and Nature Reserve is located to the east. Appin is part of the Upper Georges River Catchment.

The Bureau of Meteorology operates a Weather Watch radar station at Bulli, known as the "Sydney (Appin) radar" 34°15′36″S 150°52′12″E. Its coverage extends to Newcastle, Bathurst, Lake George and Ulladulla.

=== Industries and employment ===
The coal mines continue to be a major employer. Inghams Enterprises operate several factory farms. An industrial area has been established to the south of Appin. Here also is the Macarthur Water Treatment Plant. Completed in 1995, which supplies the Camden, Campbelltown and Wollondilly areas.

=== Education ===
Appin Public School was opened in 1867. Before this, Catholic and Anglican Denominational Schools had been conducted in the district, but both had closed by 1870.

Secondary school students today attend high schools in Campbelltown and other areas. Tertiary education is available from institutions in adjacent towns: the Western Sydney University at Campbelltown, the University of Wollongong and Campbelltown TAFE.

=== Sport ===
- North of town lies the Appin Greyhound Track and the Appin Motocross Circuit.
- Tennis courts and a sportsground are located within the township (Wonson Oval).
- Appin is home to the Appin Dogs Rugby League Football Teams (producing former Australian test and NSW Origin three-quarter Michael De Vere): a women's rugby team was established in 2010.
- Appin Touch Association run mixed and junior touch football competitions in the summer season for the locals of Appin and surrounding areas.
- The Appin Touch representative team compete in the NSW Touch Vawdon Cup and State Cup on a yearly basis, with the Mixed team winning gold in the 2018 State Cup and the Men's team winning in the 2019 Vawdon Cup.
- Appin United Soccer Club have their home ground at the Gordon Lewis Oval.
- Appin also have their own Netball team: Appin Netball Club.

== Gallery ==
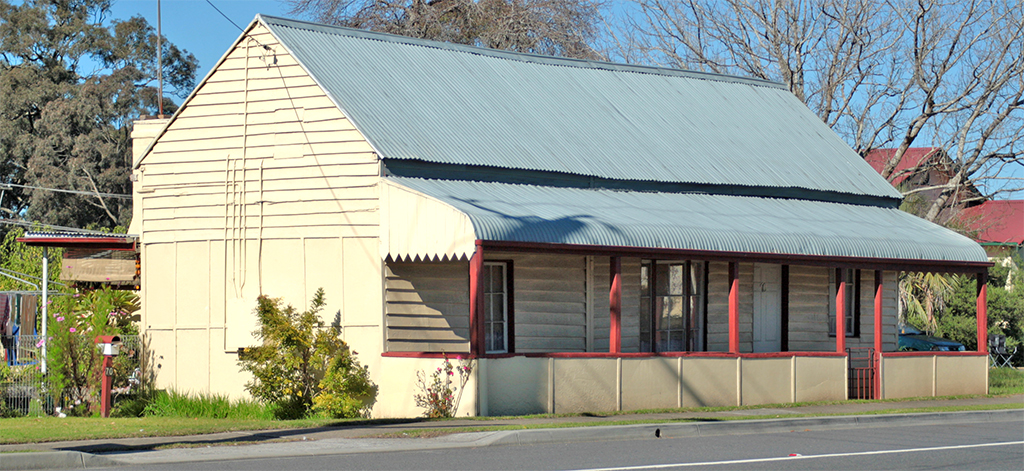
Former Post Office, 1835

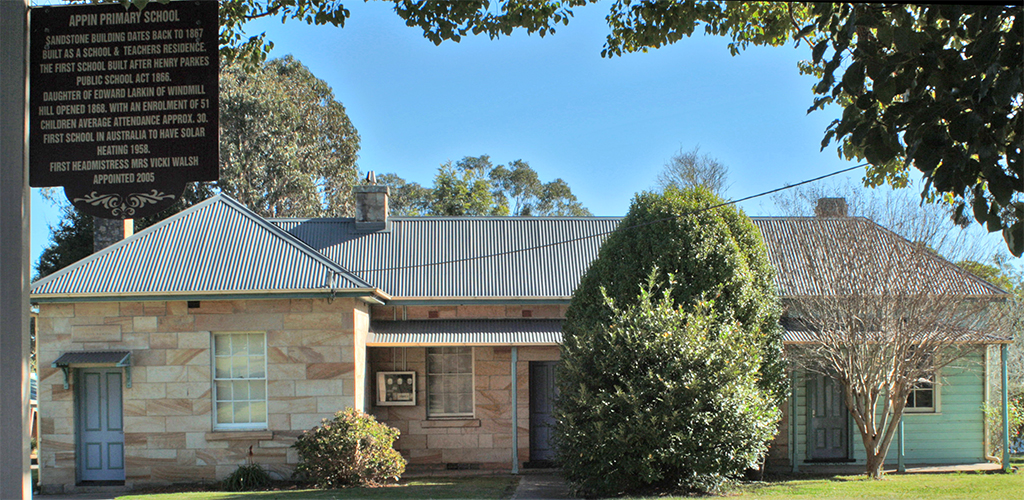
Appin Public School, 1867

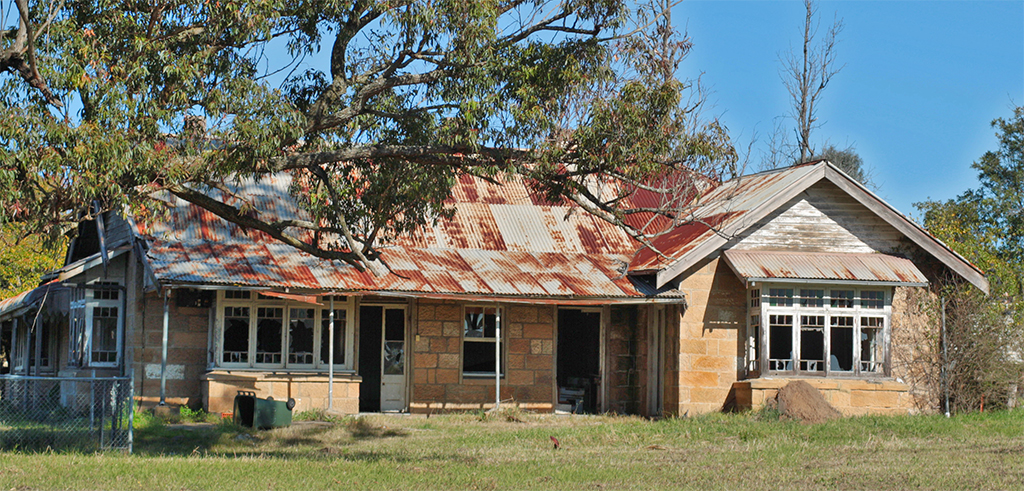
Derelict Appin Inn, 1826

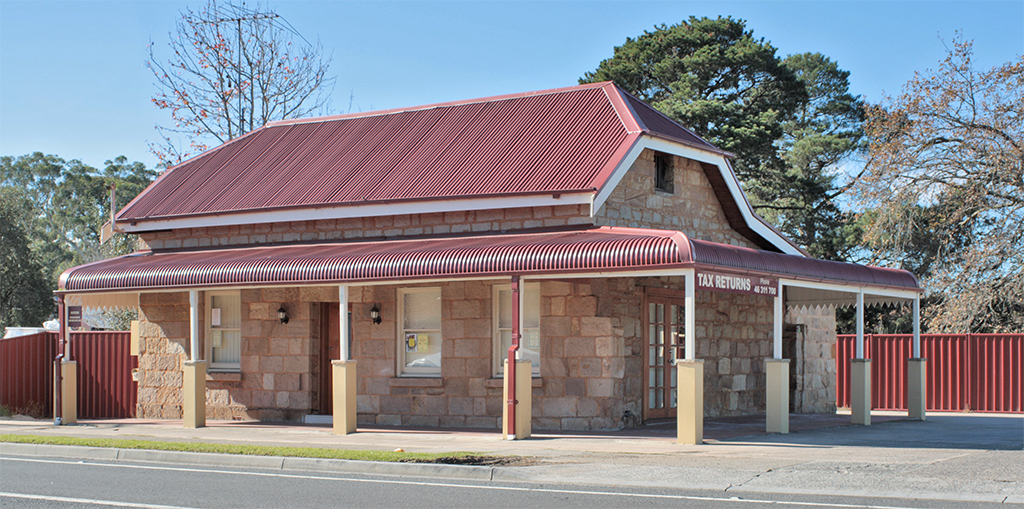
Colonial era stone building
in main street

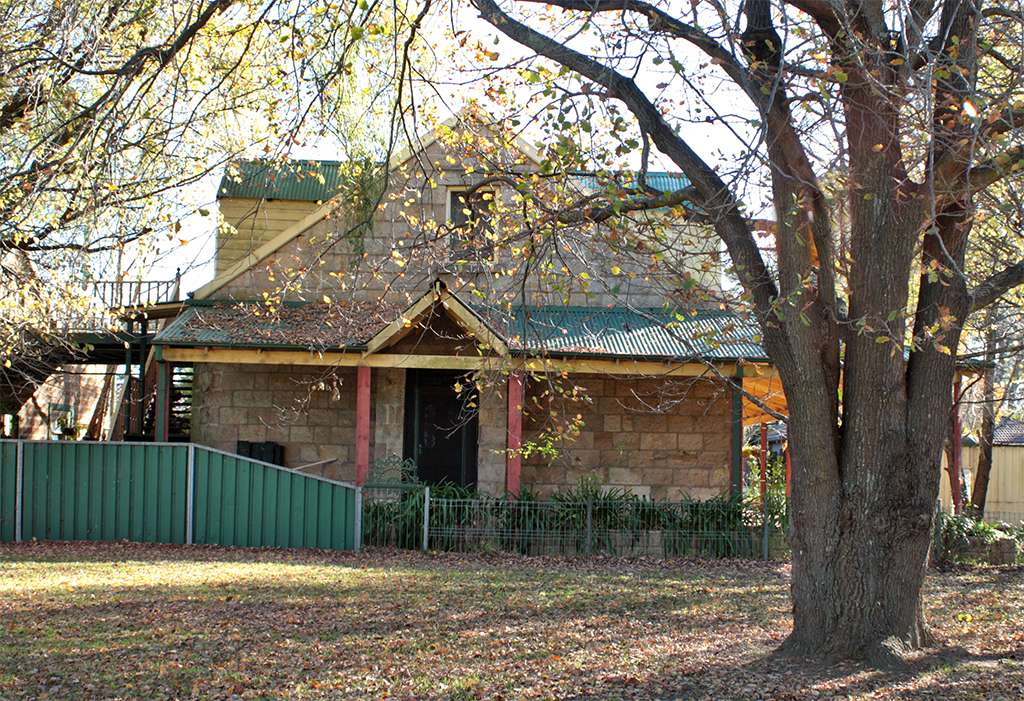
Former Anglican Rectory, 1843

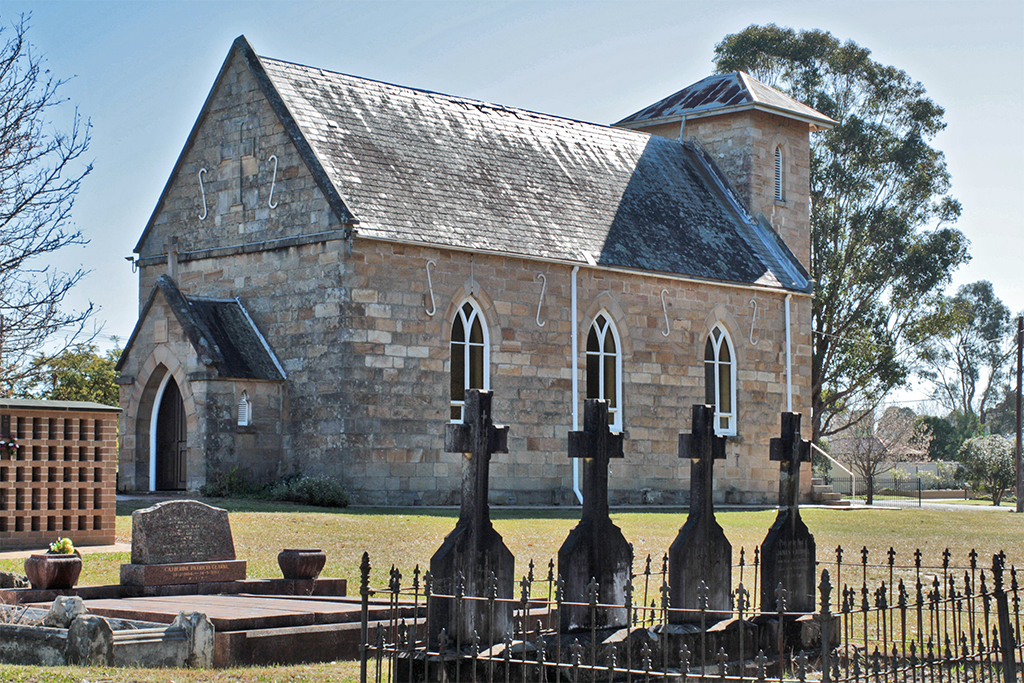
St Bede's Catholic Church, 1837-43

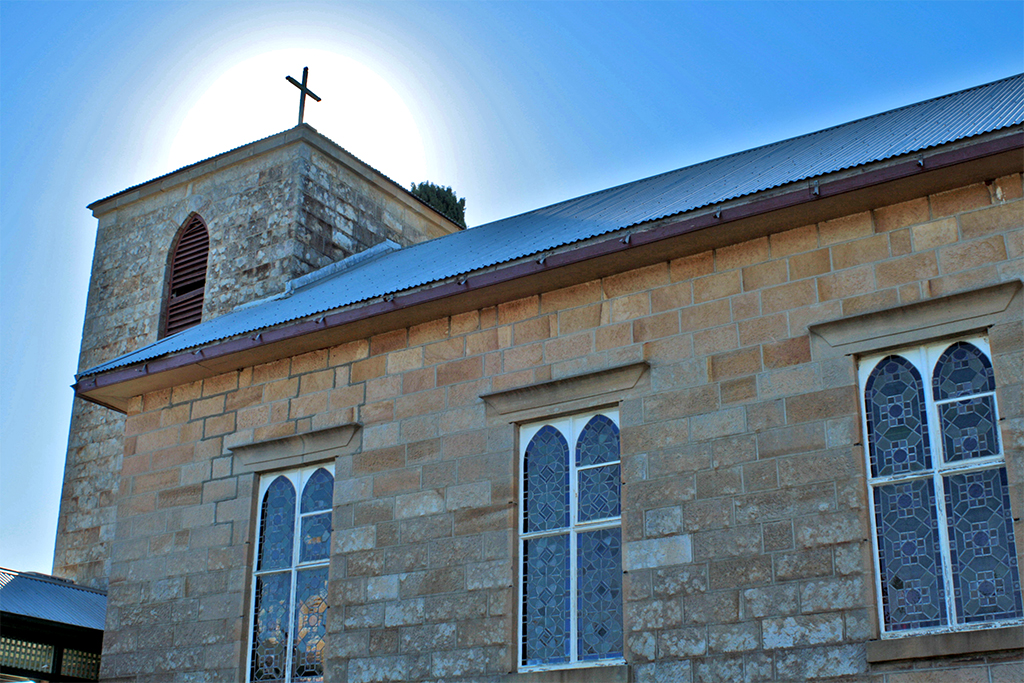
St Mark the Evangelist
Anglican Church, 1843

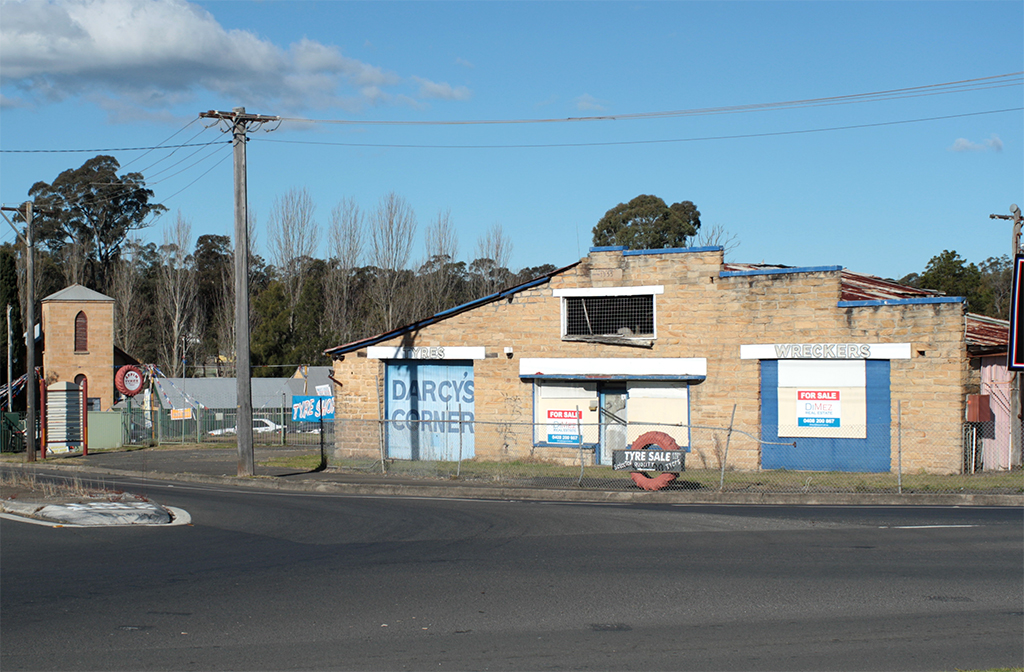
Darcy's Corner, c. 1955.

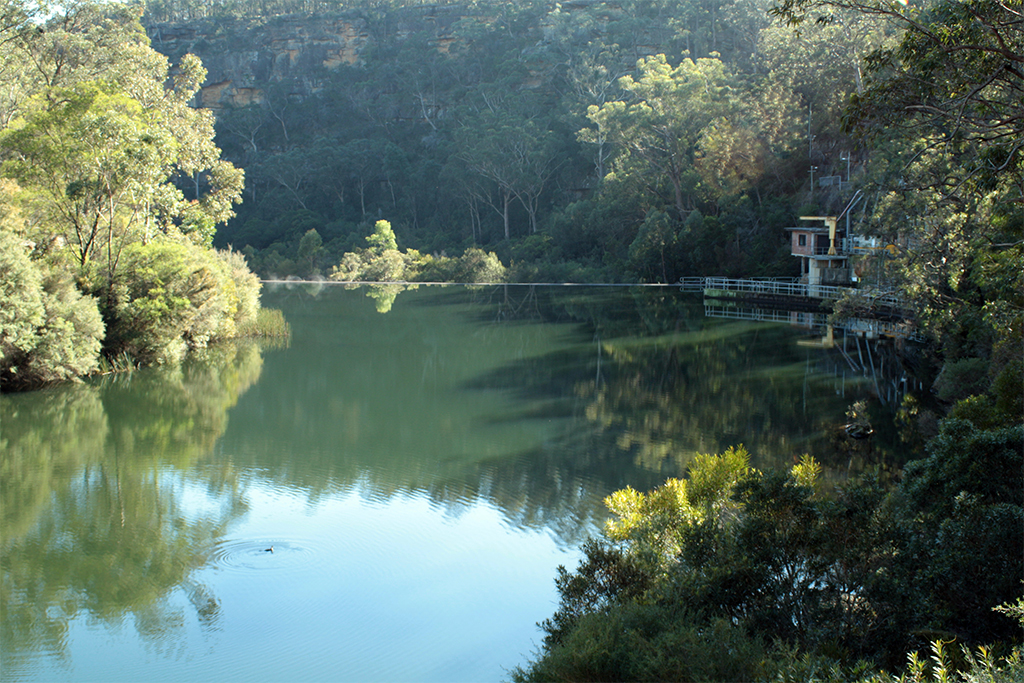
Broughton's Pass Weir

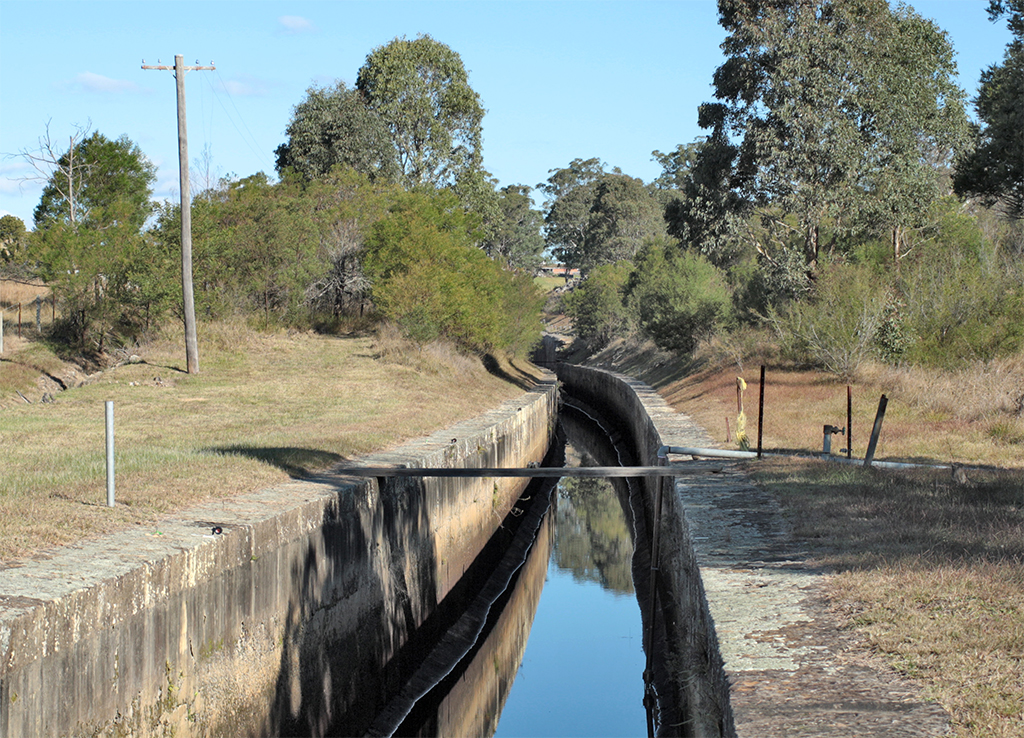
Upper Canal
west of Appin

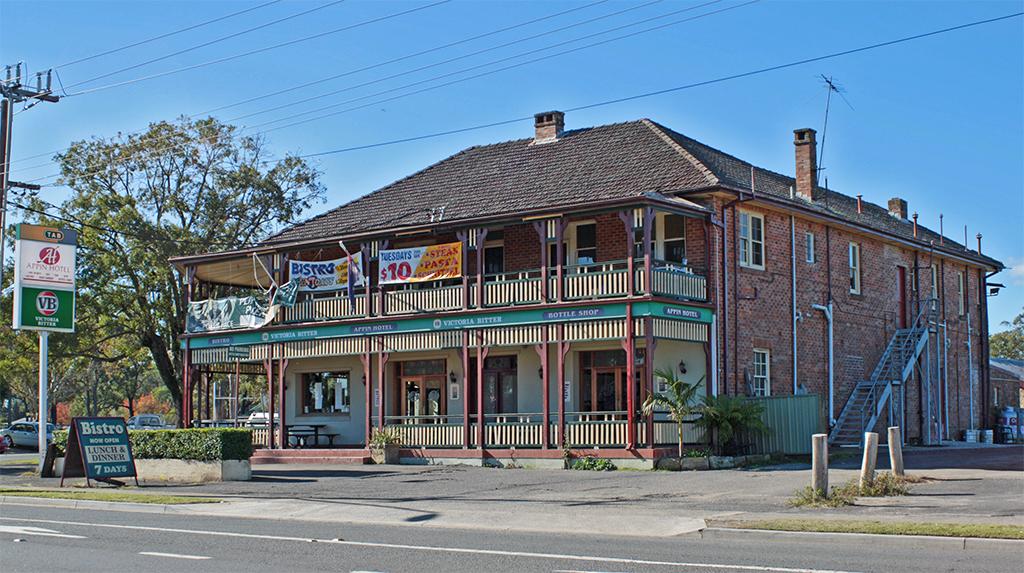
Appin Hotel

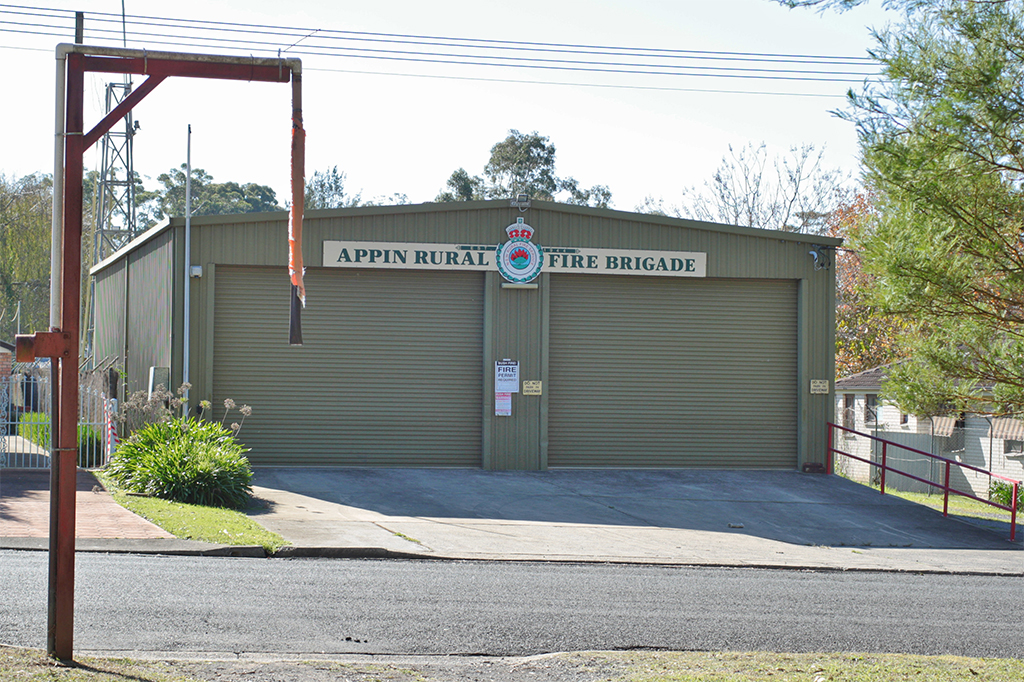
Rural Fire Brigade Shed

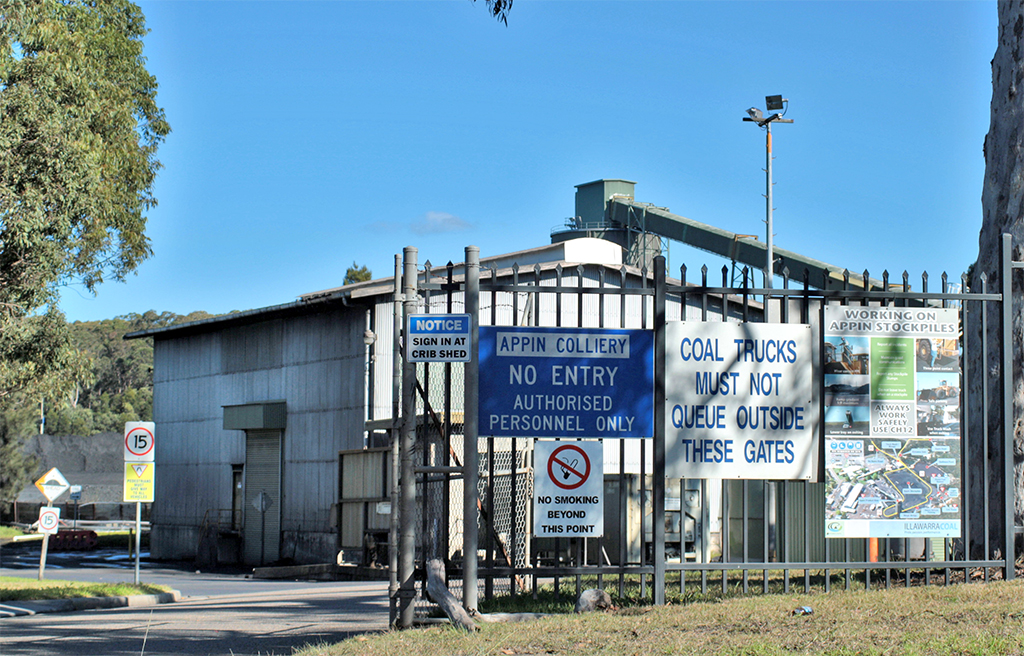
Entrance, Appin Colliery

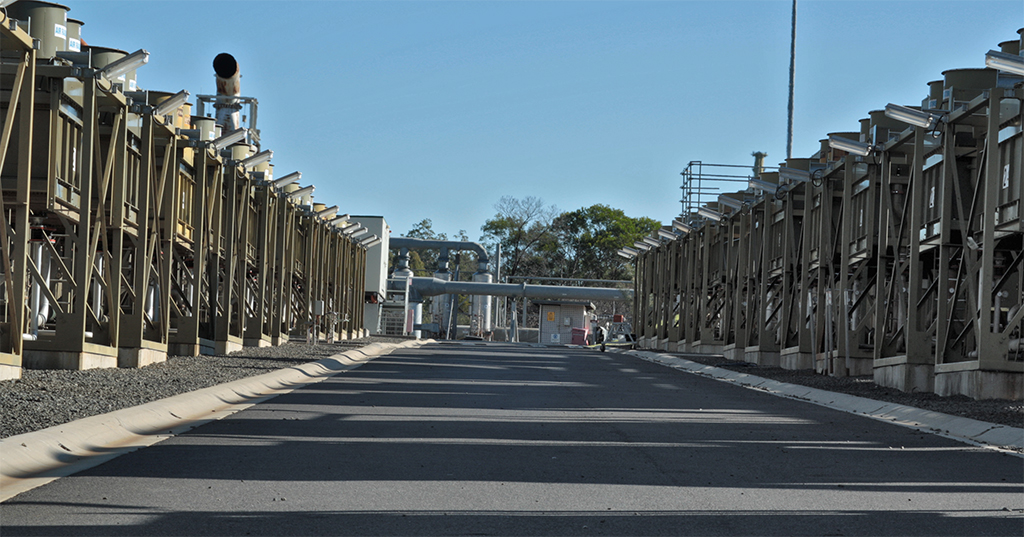
Methane Gas Power Plant

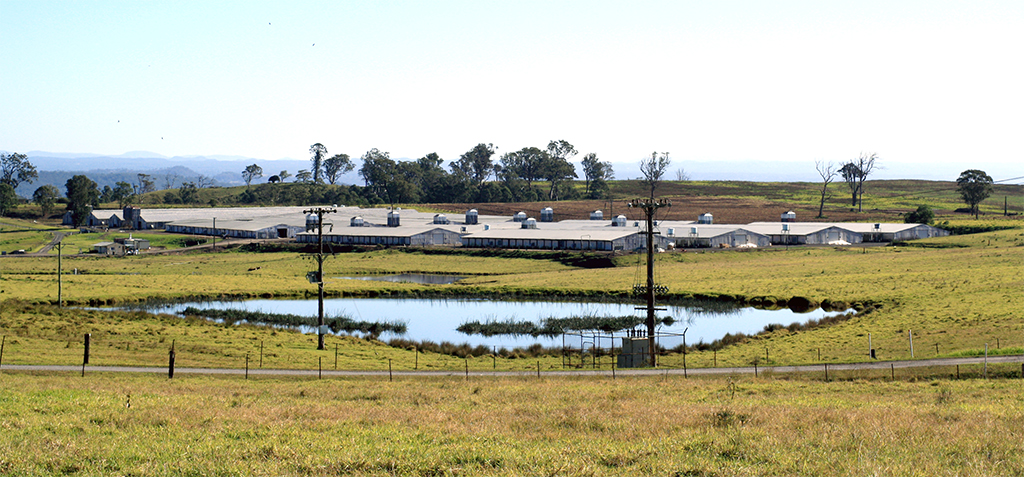
Inghams Broilers factory farm

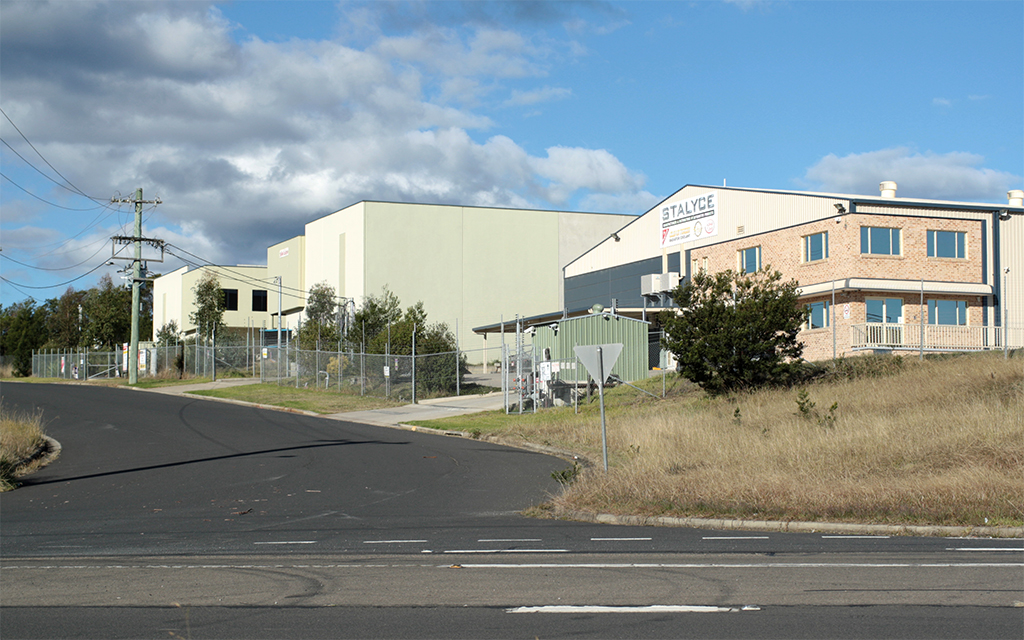
Industrial Area, south of town

== Notes and references ==
Notes

== Bibliography and further reading ==
- Appin Public School centenary. 1968. Appin Public School Centenary Committee.
- Butler, B. N. 1988. St Mark the Evangelist Anglican Church, Appin : 150 years of ministry, 1838-1988.
- Fowler, L.R. (ed.) 1989. A History of the forbidden land Wollondilly Shire. ISBN 0-7316-3746-1
- Hume, Emma. Diaries. Emma Hume of 'Beulah', Appin Road, Appin, NSW. 1893–1917.
- The Letters of Rachel Henning, 29 March 1855
- Holmes, Marie. 1997. St Bede's Church, Appin Campbelltown & Airds Historical Society. ISBN 0-9586776-3-8
- McGill, Ruth. 1994. The Appin massacre by Ruth McGill. Campbelltown, N.S.W.
- Percival, Syd. 1992. Chronicles of Appin, NSW / by Syd Percival. Campbelltown and Airds Historical Society. ISBN 0-9591729-7-1
- Proudfoot, Helen. 1977. Colonial buildings : Macarthur Growth Centre, Campbelltown, Camden, Appin Macarthur Development Board.
- Whitaker, Anne-Maree. 2005. Appin: the story of a Macquarie town. Kingsclear Books, Sydney. ISBN 0-908272-84-7
- Selections from Appin: the story of a Macquarie town are available from Google Books
