= Pilot valve =

Small valve which controls a larger valve

A pilot valve is a small valve that controls a limited-flow control feed to a separate piloted valve. A pilot valve is one part of a larger pilot‑operated valve assembly, typically controlling a high pressure or high flow feed. Pilot valves are useful because they allow a small and easily operated feed to control a much higher pressure or higher flow feed, which would otherwise require a much larger force to operate; indeed, this is even useful when a solenoid is used to operate the valve.

Pilot valves are often used in critical applications (e.g., emergency and SIS controls) and are human-operated. They can be set up as a push-to-activate or dead man's switch.

== See also ==
- Larner–Johnson valve
- Pilot-operated relief valve
