= Larner–Johnson valve =

Valve to control large flows of water in pipes

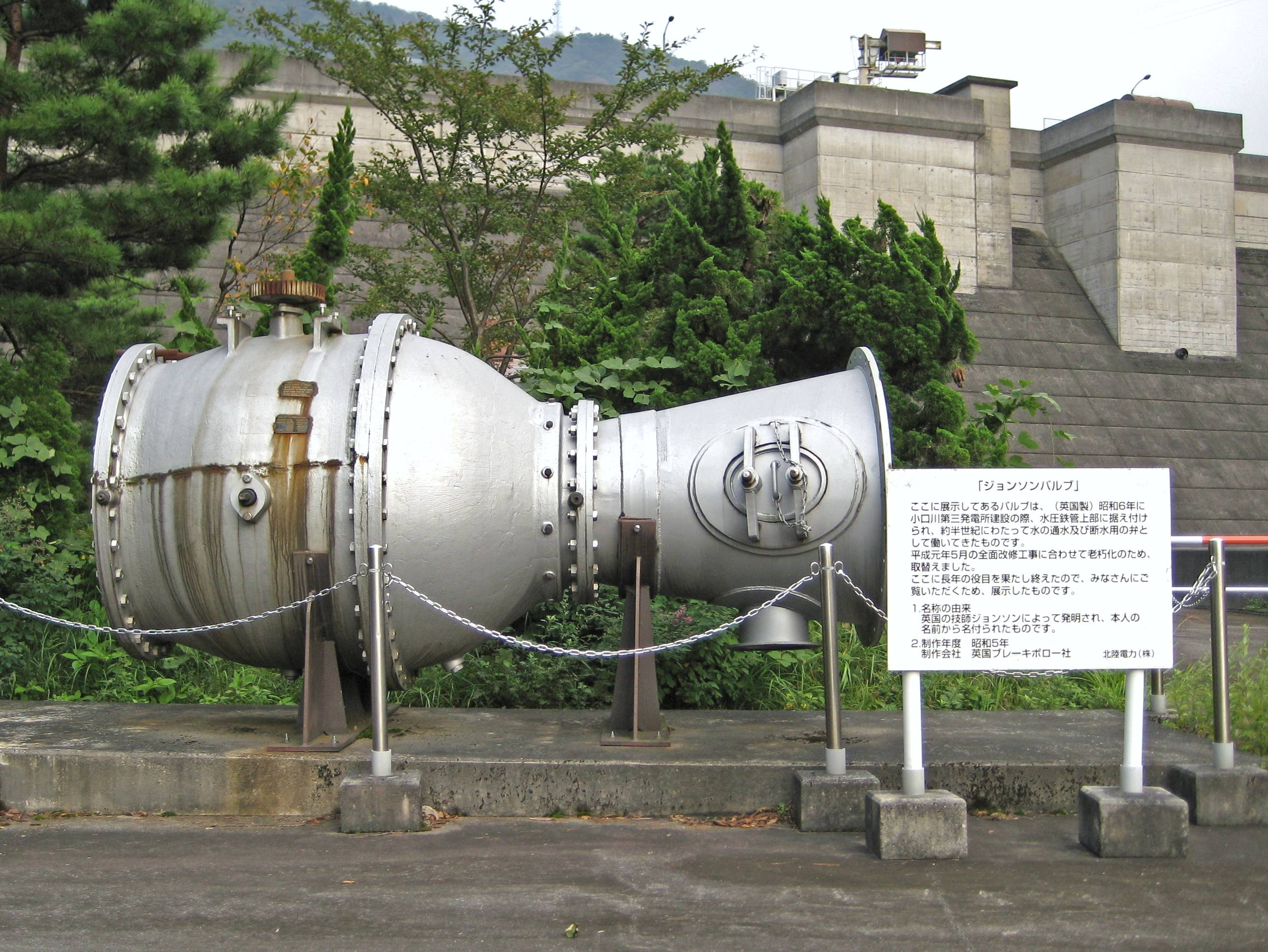
Valve at Oguchigawa III hydro-electric power station

A Larner–Johnson valve is a mechanism used in dams and water pumping to control the flow of water through large pipes. The valve is suited to handling high velocity flow with minimal turbulence, even when partially open, and the actuating force can be provided by the water flow it is controlling. It was manufactured in the early 20th century by the Larner-Johnson Company in the US. The valves are still manufactured in the United Kingdom by Blackhall Engineering Ltd. These valves have been constructed in sizes up to 21 feet (6.4 m) diameter and controlling a hydraulic head of 1,000 feet (300 m).

In 2009, Blackhall Engineering supplied four 60" bore Larner–Johnson valves to New York City Department of Environmental Protection for the Ashokan Reservoir in upstate New York. Each valve is capable of passing a flow rate of 19 cubic metres/second, which is the equivalent of 19 tons of water per second. The valves control the flow of water out of the Ashokan Reservoir into the Catskill Aqueduct down to New York City.

== Operation ==
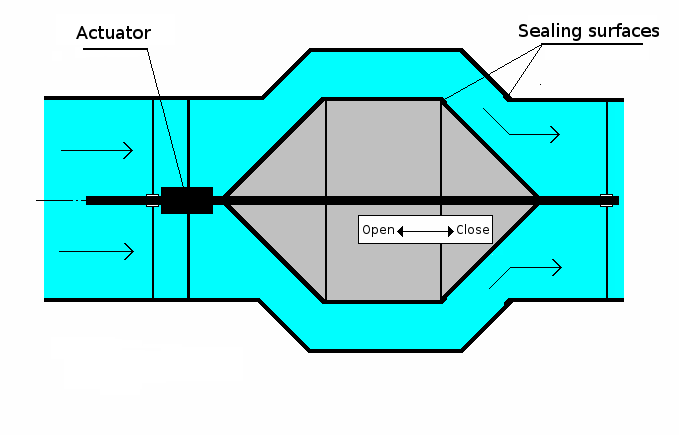
Basic operation illustration

The valve is housed within a bulged section of the penstock pipe. The valve mechanism forms a cylindrical body within this pipe, with the water flowing around it. This downstream section of this valve body is conical and free to move axially. When it moves downstream, it seals against a conical surface at the outlet of the valve, closing off the flow. When closed, the valve is held shut by the supply water pressure, providing a good seal.

The valve is hydraulically actuated, by the pressure of the flow that it is controlling. A servomechanism is used to generate the large forces needed for these huge valves, power being derived from the pressure of the water itself. Although the pressure within the pipe cannot be increased above that of the supply, it can be decreased. The pipe cross-section at the lower (downstream) part of the valve is reduced in section compared to that above the valve. By Bernoulli's principle, this increases the flow velocity of the water, thus reducing pressure. (Note: When installed in a pipeline, an expanding section in the pipe after the valve increases area, reduces velocity and recovers this pressure.) If water pressure is bled away through a drain valve, obviously that will reduce its pressure too.

Internally the fixed valve body is constructed as a cylinder, with the moving part of the valve within this as a piston. The conical valve is part of this piston. The piston is double-acting and splits the internal valve body in two, with water pressure on both sides. The upper side of the piston is larger, the full diameter of the piston, and is supplied with water through a throttling valve; normally adjusted and then left in position. The lower side of the piston is an annular space surrounding the moving valve body and maintained at the lower (Bernoulli) water pressure. The tip of the conical valve contains a small pilot valve, linking the upper chamber of the valve to the downstream drain below the valve. This pilot valve is controlled mechanically from outside the valve chamber and is the main control over the valve position.

When water pressure builds up in the upper chamber, through the throttle valve, this forces the valve downstream and closes it against the seat. As the area of the piston on this side is larger, the pressure easily outbalances the smaller area (Note: Any pressure in the area below the valve seat also presses in this opening direction, so the downstream force cannot rely on the reduced annular area alone. When the valve is closed this pressure is almost zero as there is no water present, but when the valve is near the open position, this pressure may be appreciable.) of the annular piston below.

If the pilot valve is opened, water drains from the upper chamber and its pressure is reduced. The pilot valve is always larger in flowrate than the filling through the throttle valve. Pressure in the annular chamber now forces the piston upstream, lifting the valve body from the conical seat and opening the valve.

At intermediate positions, pressure in the two chambers is balanced and the valve remains part-open. This depends on the piston size, the pressure reduction downstream and the flows through the two control valves. The pilot valve gives a proportional control over main valve flowrate, with the opening being controlled, slow and gradual.

If the pilot valve is closed, pressure now builds up in the upper chamber, overwhelming the lower pressure and force in the downstream chamber. The valve is once again forced closed.

The enormous forces involved in a valve of this type can give trouble for many types of valve. In the Larner–Johnson valve a great advantage is that these forces are always balanced and act only within the valve body, not on its actuators. This gives freedom from distortion and great reliability.
