= Cataract, New South Wales =

Cataract is a locality split between the Wollondilly Shire and the City of Wollongong, both in New South Wales, Australia.

== Heritage listings ==
Cataract has a number of heritage-listed sites, including:

- Cataract Road: Cataract Dam
