= Bendeela Pondage =

Dam in New South Wales, Australia

- Location in New South Wales
- Coordinates: 34°43′30″S 150°28′47″E
- Status: Operational
- Opening date: 1972

Dam and spillways
- Type of dam: Embankment dam
- Impounds: Kangaroo River
- Height: 15 m (49 ft)
- Length: 2,118 m (6,949 ft)
- Spillways: 1
- Spillway type: Weir-type

Reservoir
- Total capacity: 1,200 ML (42×10^{6} cu ft)
- Catchment area: 20 ha (49 acres)
- Surface area: 20 ha (49 acres)
- Website; Bendeela Pondage at www.sca.nsw.gov.au

Bendeela Pondage, completed in 1972, is an earth and rockfill embankment dam structure located on the Kangaroo River arm of Lake Yarrunga in New South Wales, Australia. It is located between Fitzroy Falls Dam and Tallowa Dam. The pondage, part of the Shoalhaven Scheme, functions as a buffer storage for out-of-balance flow between the two dams during hydro-electric power generation or water pumping at Kangaroo Valley and Bendeela pumping and power stations. The dam has no significant catchment but has been provided with a weir type spillway to protect the dam in the event of operational problems at the two pumping and power stations. The embankment is 15 metres (49 ft) high and 2,118 metres (6,949 ft) in length. At 100% capacity, the dam wall holds back approximately 1,200 megalitres (42×10^{6} cu ft).

== Bendeela Pumping and Power Station ==
A 740-metre (2,430 ft) pipeline connects Bendeela Pumping and Power Station with Bendeela Pondage. Some 3,680 millimetres (145 in) in diameter, the pipeline is capable of handling water capacity of 205 megalitres (7.2×10^{6} cu ft) per hour.

== See also ==
- List of reservoirs and dams in Australia
