= Fitzroy Falls Dam =

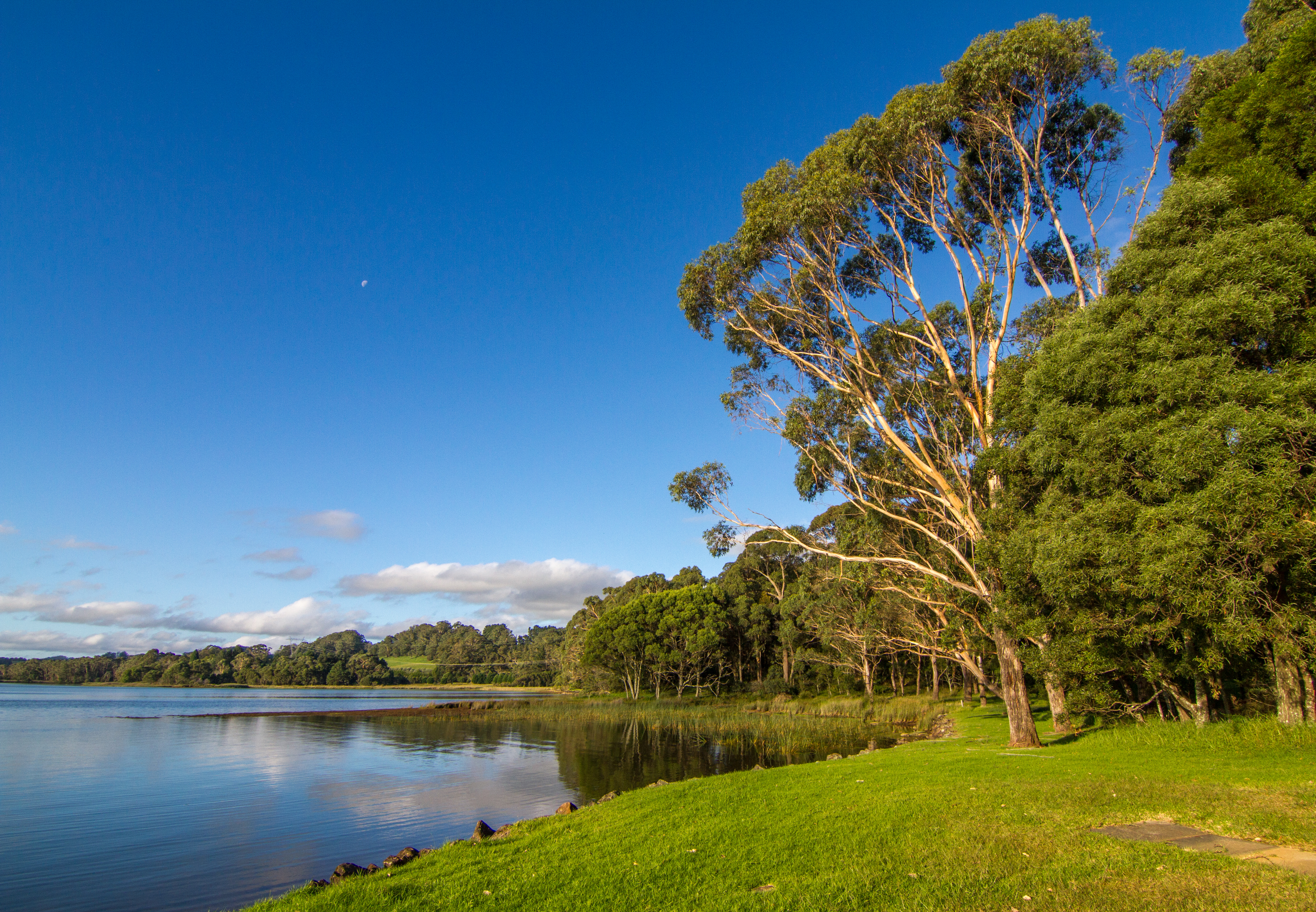
- The Fitzroy Falls Reservoir, 2015

- Location in New South Wales
- Country: Australia
- Coordinates: 34°38′46″S 150°29′15″E
- Status: Operational
- Opening date: 1974

Dam and spillways
- Type of dam: Embankment dam
- Impounds: Yarrunga Creek
- Height: 14 m (46 ft)
- Length: 1,530 m (5,020 ft)
- Dam volume: 760 m^{3} (27,000 cu ft)
- Spillway capacity: 516 m^{3}/s (18,200 cu ft/s)

Reservoir
- Creates: Fitzroy Falls Reservoir
- Total capacity: 9,950 ML (351×10^{6} cu ft)
- Catchment area: 31 km^{2} (12 sq mi)
- Surface area: 522 ha (1,290 acres)
- Website; Fitzroy Falls Reservoir at waternsw.com.au

Fitzroy Falls Dam, located in New South Wales, Australia, is part of the Shoalhaven Scheme, a complex of dams and pipelines that was completed in 1974. It consists of four separate earth and rockfill embankments located on the Yarrunga Creek upstream of Fitzroy Falls and about 16 kilometres (9.9 mi) southeast of Moss Vale. The main embankment of 760 cubic metres (27,000 cu ft) is 14 metres (46 ft) high and 1,530 metres (5,020 ft) in length. At 100% capacity, the dam wall holds back approximately 9,950 megalitres (351×10^{6} cu ft) of water, creating the impounded Fitzroy Falls Reservoir, which has a surface area of 522 hectares (1,290 acres), drawn from a catchment area of 31 square kilometres (12 sq mi). The spillway has a discharge capacity of 516 cubic metres per second (18,200 cu ft/s).

The 3,030-metre (9,940 ft) Wildes Meadow Canal connects the reservoir to the Burrawang Pumping Station. The 2,830-metre (9,280 ft) Burrawang Tunnel and 1,000-metre (3,300 ft) Canal join the pumping station to the Wingecarribee Reservoir.

The Fitzroy Falls Dam is connected to the Bendeela Pondage via the Bendeela Pumping and Power Station, allowing it to act as both a hydroelectric power source and a storage reservoir that can send water to the Tallowa Dam, which feeds the Wingecarribee and Warragamba.

== See also ==
- List of reservoirs and dams in Australia
