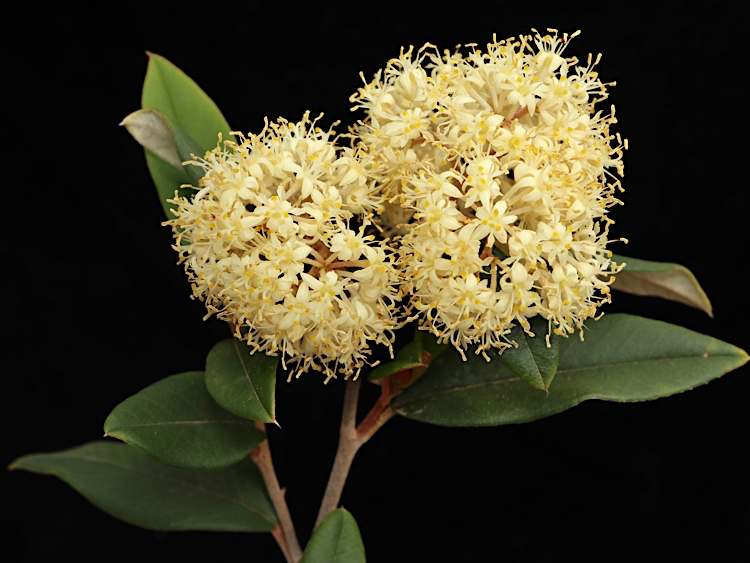

Conservation status
- Critically endangered (EPBC Act)

Scientific classification
- Kingdom: Plantae
- Clade: Tracheophytes
- Clade: Angiosperms
- Clade: Eudicots
- Clade: Rosids
- Order: Rosales
- Family: Rhamnaceae
- Genus: Pomaderris
- Species: P. walshii

Binomial name
- Pomaderris walshii Millott & K.L.McDougall

= Pomaderris walshii =

Carrington Falls pomaderris

Species of plant

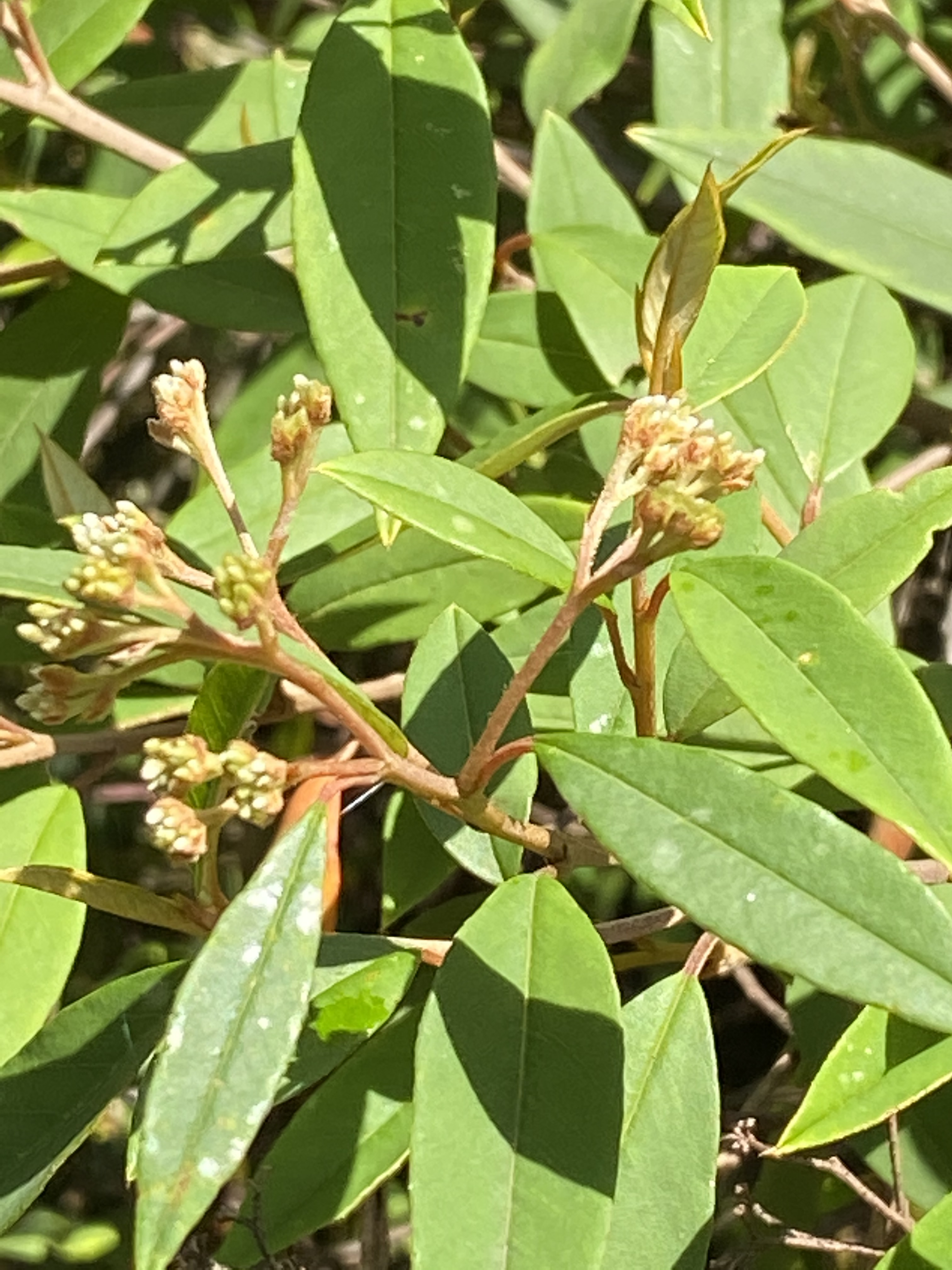
Buds & foliage

Pomaderris walshii, commonly known as Carrington Falls pomaderris, is a species of flowering plant in the family Rhamnaceae and is endemic to a restricted area of New South Wales. It is a shrub or small tree with hairy young stems, narrowly egg-shaped leaves, and panicles of cream-coloured to yellow flowers.

== Description ==
Pomaderris walshii is a shrub or tree that typically grows to a height of up to 3 m (9.8 ft), its young stems covered with silvery to rust-coloured simple hairs and white, star-shaped hairs. The leaves are narrowly egg-shaped, mostly 43–52 mm (1.7–2.0 in) long and 14–19 mm (0.55–0.75 in) wide on a petiole 4–10 mm (0.16–0.39 in) long with stipules 2–6 mm (0.079–0.236 in) long at the base but that fall off as the leaf matures. The flowers are borne in pyramid-shaped to hemispherical clusters of 20 to 100 near the ends of branchlets, the clusters 40–65 mm (1.6–2.6 in) long and wide. The flowers are cream-coloured to yellow and covered with hairs similar to those on the young stems, each flower on a pedicel 1.5–4.3 mm (0.059–0.169 in) long. The sepals are 1.8–2.0 mm (0.071–0.079 in) long, the petals 1.7–1.9 mm (0.067–0.075 in) long, the stamens 2.0–2.5 mm (0.079–0.098 in) long and the style 1.6–1.9 mm (0.063–0.075 in) long. Flowering occurs from July to November.

== Taxonomy ==
Pomaderris walshii was first formally described in 2005 by Jacqueline C. Millott and Keith Leonard McDougall in the journal Telopea from specimens collected in 2003 by Millott from Budderoo National Park. The specific epithet (walshii) honours Neville Grant Walsh.

== Distribution and habitat ==
Carrington Falls pomaderris grows in shrubland near watercourses and is only known from the upper Kangaroo River and its tributaries, above the escarpment near Robertson on the Central Tablelands of New South Wales.

== Conservation status ==
Pomaderris walshii is listed as "critically endangered" under the Australian Government Environment Protection and Biodiversity Conservation Act 1999 and under the New South Wales Government Biodiversity Conservation Act 2016. The main threats to the species include flood damage during high rainfall events, inappropriate fire regimes and the species' small population size and limited distribution.
