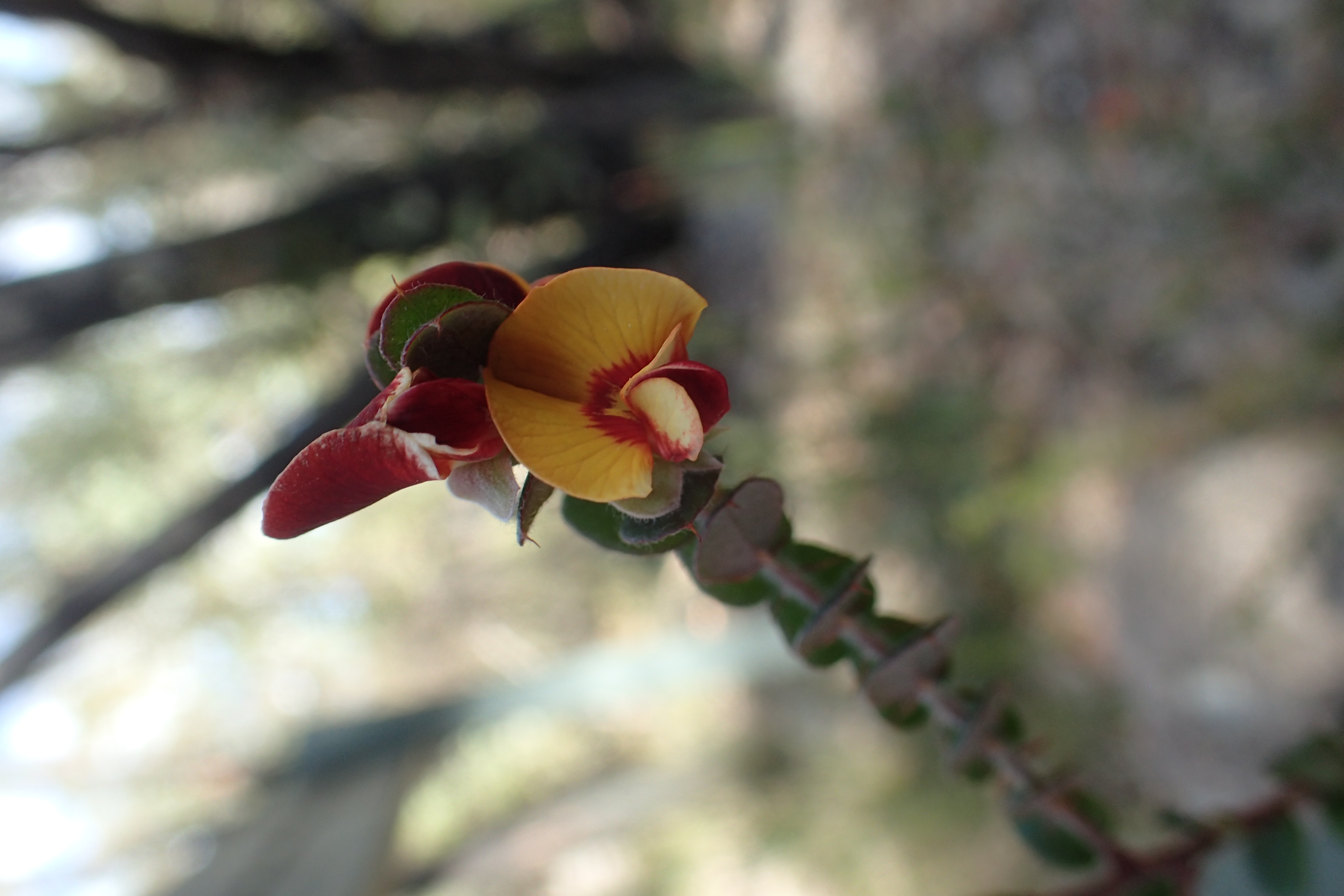
- In the Gibraltar Range National Park

Scientific classification
- Kingdom: Plantae
- Clade: Tracheophytes
- Clade: Angiosperms
- Clade: Eudicots
- Clade: Rosids
- Order: Fabales
- Family: Fabaceae
- Subfamily: Faboideae
- Genus: Bossiaea
- Species: B. neoanglica

Binomial name
- Bossiaea neoanglica F.Muell.
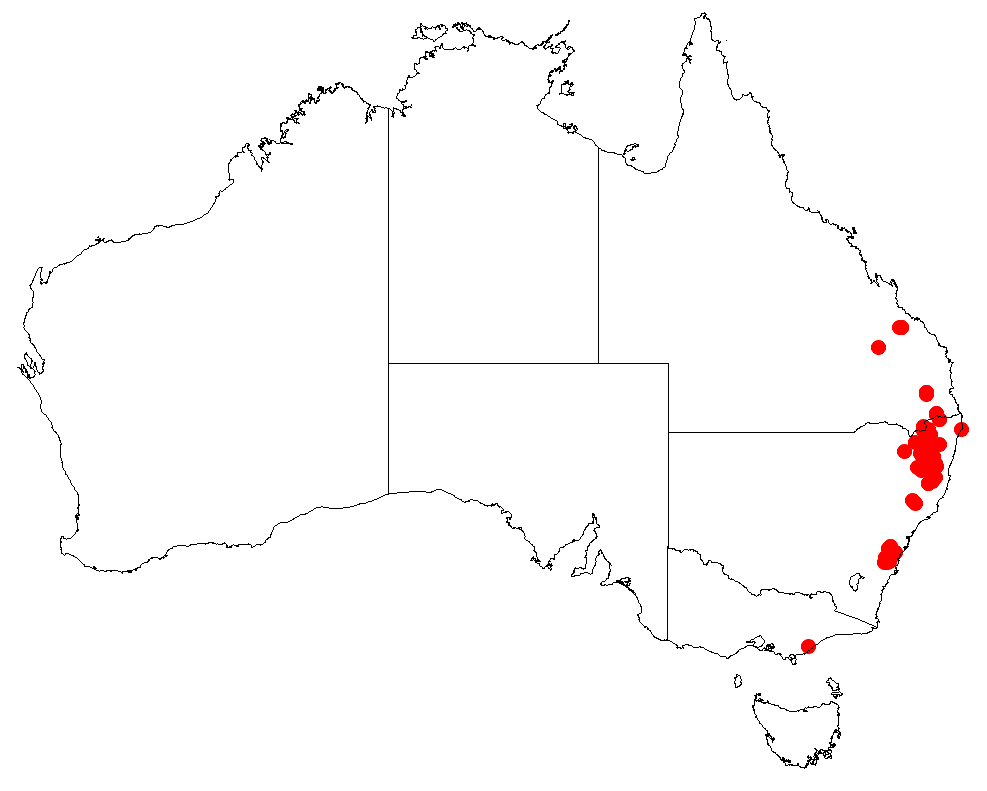
- Occurrence data from AVH

= Bossiaea neoanglica =

Species of legume

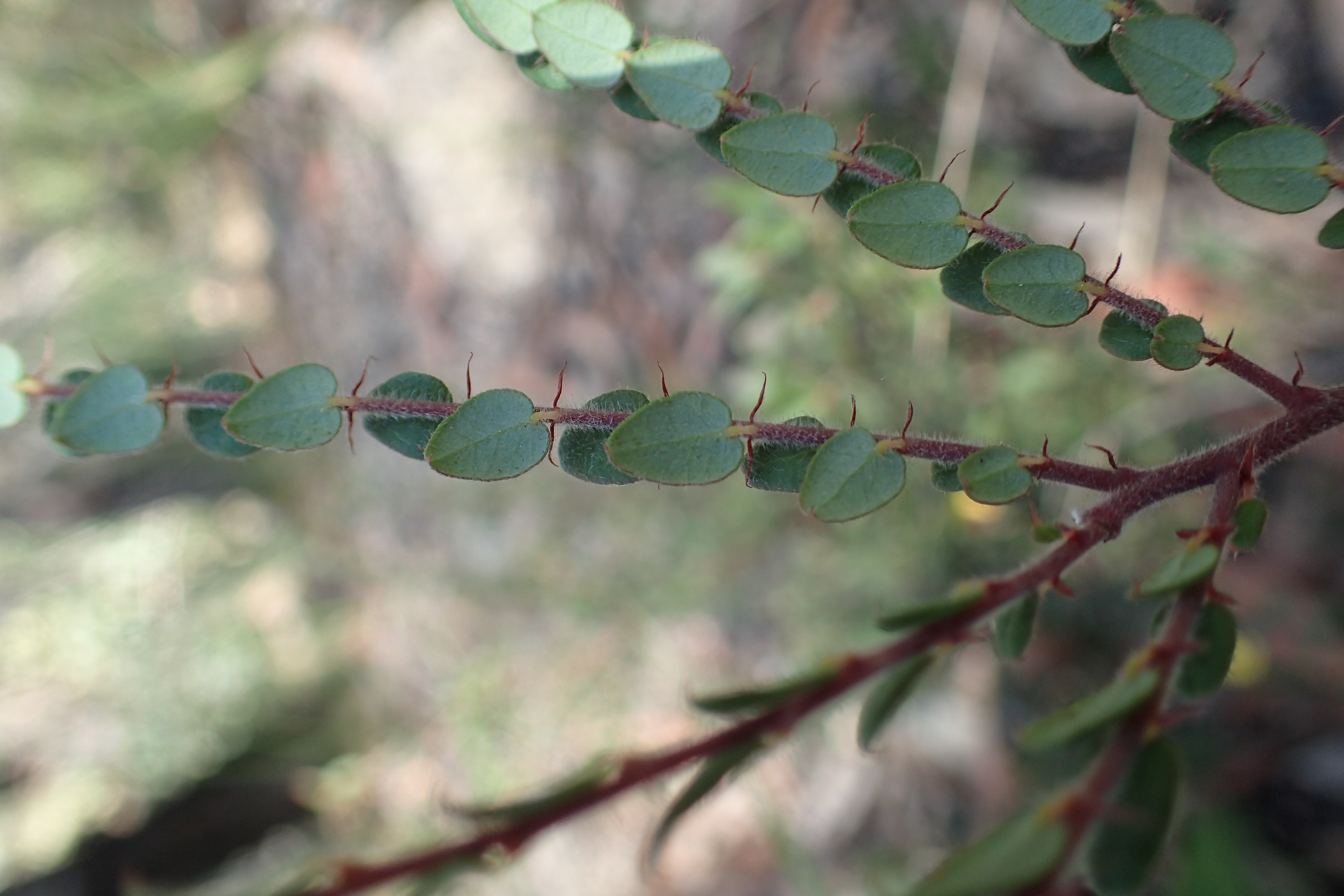
Leaves

Bossiaea neoanglica is a species of flowering plant in the family Fabaceae and is endemic to eastern Australia. It is a prostrate to low-lying shrub with sparsely hairy foliage, egg-shaped to more or less round leaves, and yellow and red flowers.

== Description ==
Bossiaea neoanglica is prostrate to low-lying shrub that typically grows up to 50 cm (20 in) high, sometimes higher when supported by other shrubs, and has sparsely hairy foliage. The leaves are arranged alternately, egg-shaped to more or less round 2–8 mm (0.079–0.315 in) long and 2–7 mm (0.079–0.276 in) wide on a petiole 0.5–0.8 mm (0.020–0.031 in) long. The lower surface of the leaves is much paler than the upper surface and there are stipules 2.0–3.5 mm (0.079–0.138 in) long at the base of the petiole. The flowers are 6–9 mm (0.24–0.35 in) long, borne on pedicels 2–5 mm (0.079–0.197 in) long with a few minute bracts at the base. The five sepals are 3–5 mm (0.12–0.20 in) long and joined at the base forming a tube, the upper lobes 2.0–2.5 mm (0.079–0.098 in) long, the lower lobes 1.0–1.5 mm (0.039–0.059 in) long. There are bracteoles 1.0–1.2 mm (0.039–0.047 in) long near the base of the sepal tube. The standard petal is yellow with a red base, the wings pale purplish brown, and the keel red with a paler base, all petals up to about 8 mm (0.31 in) long. Flowering occurs from spring to summer and the fruit is an oblong pod 15–25 mm (0.59–0.98 in) long.

== Taxonomy and naming ==
Bossiaea neoanglica was first formally described in 1866 by Ferdinand von Mueller in Fragmenta Phytographiae Australiae from specimens collected by Charles Moore near the Macleay River in the New England region of New South Wales.

== Distribution and habitat ==
This bossiaea grows in open forest and woodland from Kroombit Tops National Park in south east Queensland and south along the coast and tablelands of eastern New South Wales to Fitzroy Falls.
