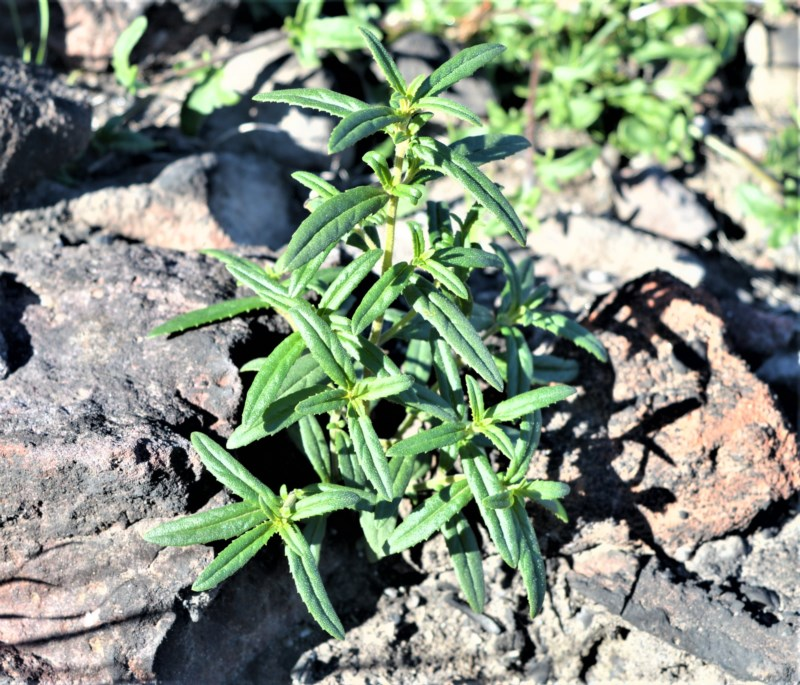

Scientific classification
- Kingdom: Plantae
- Clade: Tracheophytes
- Clade: Angiosperms
- Clade: Eudicots
- Clade: Asterids
- Order: Lamiales
- Family: Lamiaceae
- Genus: Prostanthera
- Species: P. tallowa

Binomial name
- Prostanthera tallowa B.J.Conn & T.C.Wilson
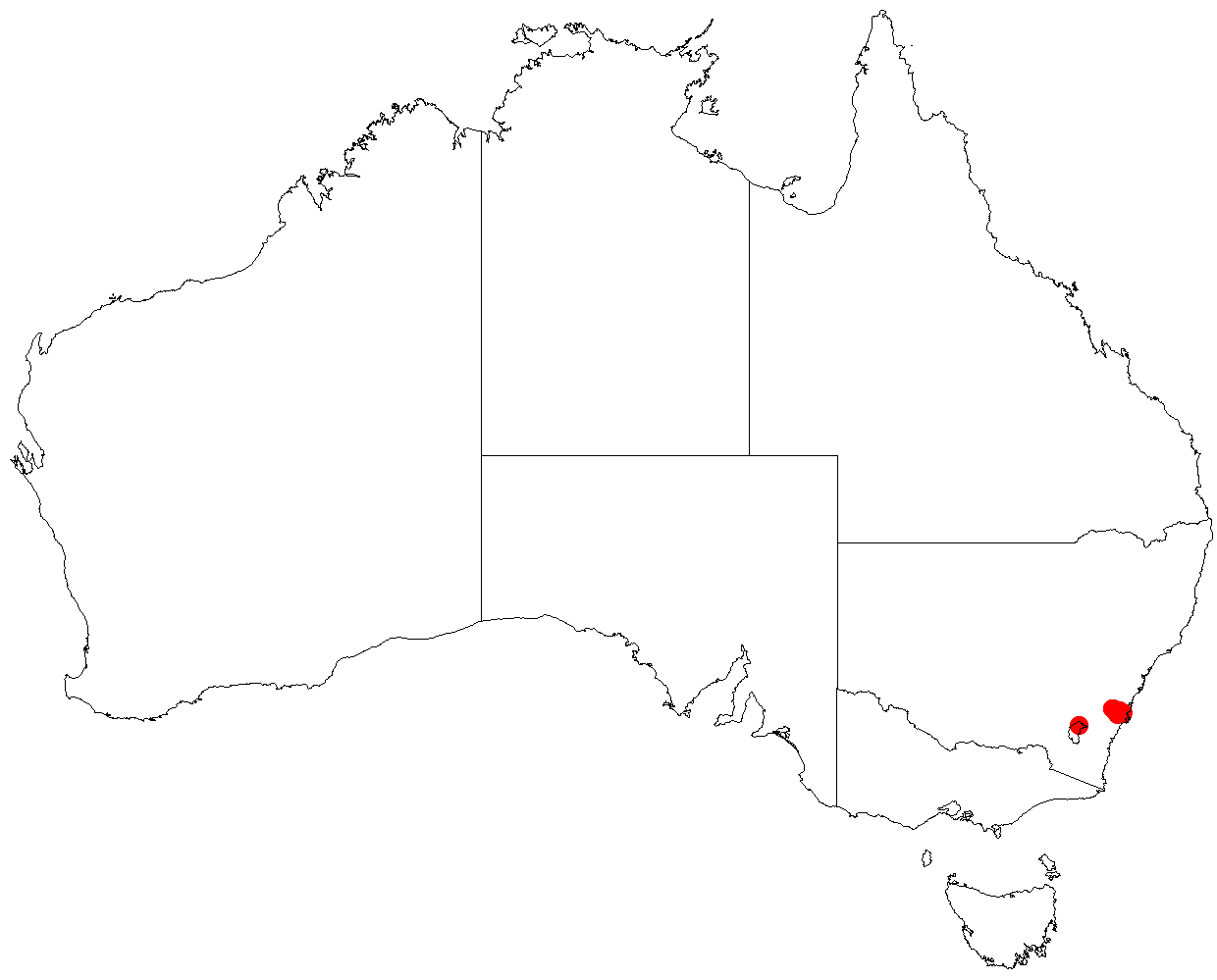
- Occurrence data from AVH

= Prostanthera tallowa =

Species of flowering plant

Prostanthera tallowa is a species of flowering plant in the family Lamiaceae and is endemic to the Kangaroo Valley area of New South Wales. It is an erect, aromatic shrub with narrow egg-shaped to linear leaves and mauve to light purple flowers with darker dots inside the petal tube.

== Description ==
Prostanthera tallowa is an erect, aromatic shrub that grows to a height of 1.5–2 m (4 ft 11 in – 6 ft 7 in) and has glabrous branches. The leaves are narrow egg-shaped to linear with finely-toothed edges, 28–45 mm (1.1–1.8 in) long and 3–5 mm (0.12–0.20 in) wide on a petiole 2–5 mm (0.079–0.197 in) long. The flowers are arranged in bunches of ten to twenty near the ends of branches, with bracteoles 4–5 mm (0.16–0.20 in) long at the base of the sepals. The sepals are 5–6 mm (0.20–0.24 in) long and form a tube 2–3 mm (0.079–0.118 in) long with two lobes, the upper lobe 2.5–3 mm (0.098–0.118 in) long. The petals are mauve to light purple with brown and purple dots, 10–12 mm (0.39–0.47 in) long forming a tube 7–8 mm (0.28–0.31 in) long with two lips. The central lobe of the lower lip is spatula-shaped, 7.5–9 mm (0.30–0.35 in) long and 7–8 mm (0.28–0.31 in) wide, the side lobes 4–5 mm (0.16–0.20 in) long and 2.5–3.5 mm (0.098–0.138 in) wide. The upper lip is broadly egg-shaped, 3–4.5 mm (0.12–0.18 in) long and 5–6 mm (0.20–0.24 in) long with a central notch about 3 mm (0.12 in) deep. Flowering mainly occurs from December to February.

== Taxonomy ==
Prostanthera tallowa was first formally described in 2012 by Barry Conn and Trevor Wilson in the journal Telopea from specimens collected in Morton National Park near Tallowa Dam in 1988. The specific epithet (tallowa) is a reference to Tallowa Dam.

== Distribution and habitat ==
This mintbush is only known from near the type location where it grows in open Eucalyptus forest on rocky soils derived from sandstone.

== Images ==
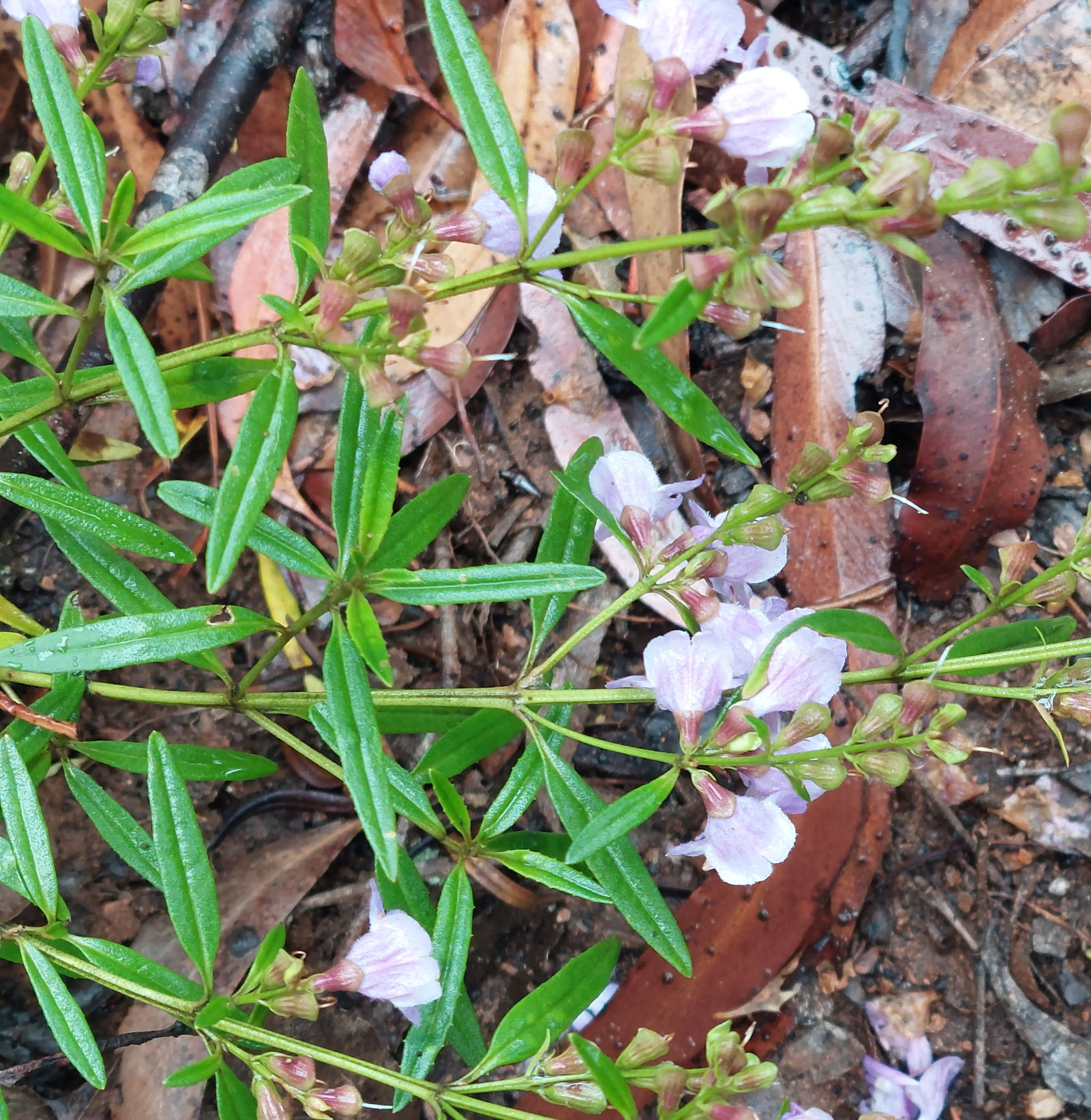
(Yalwal, NSW)

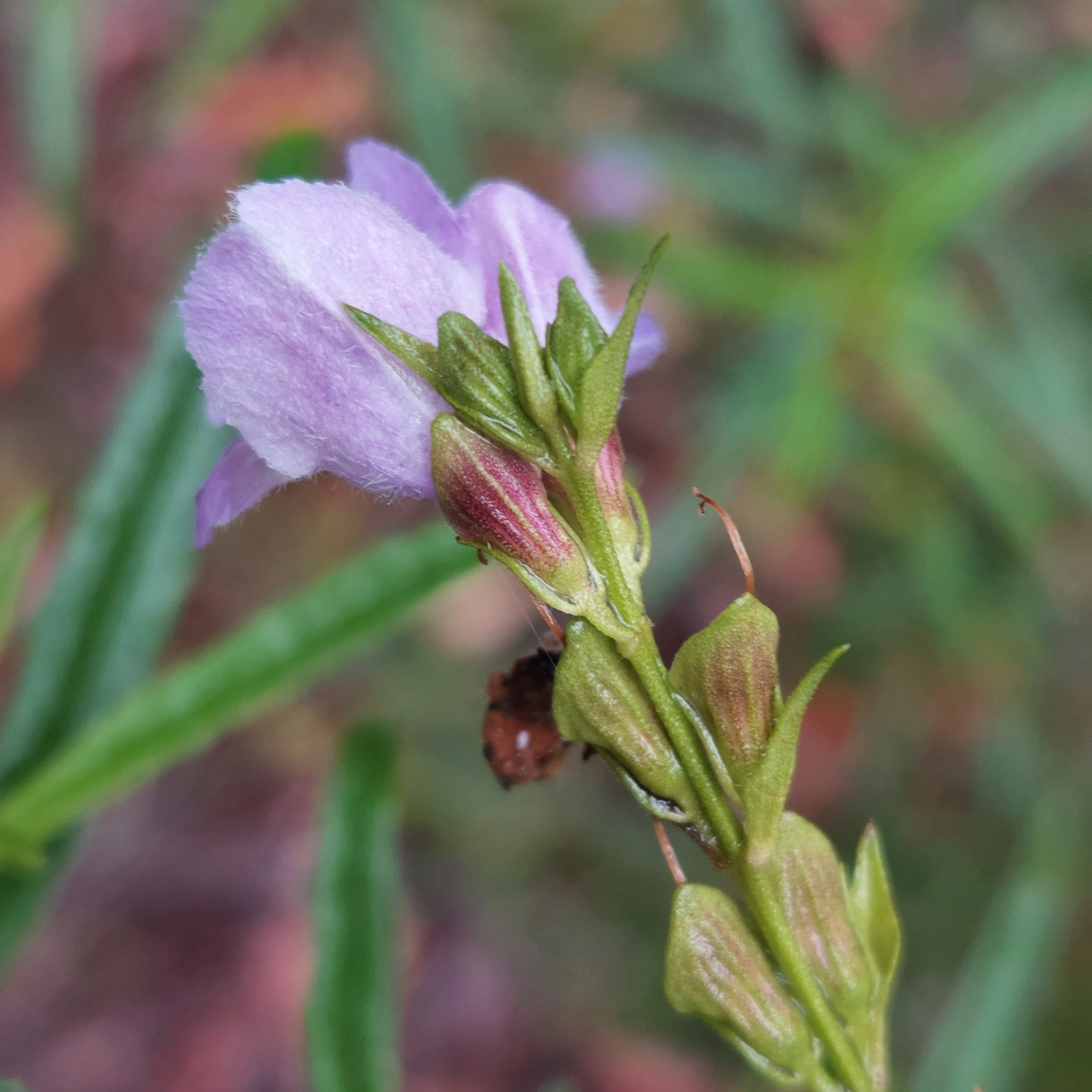
(Yalwal, NSW)
