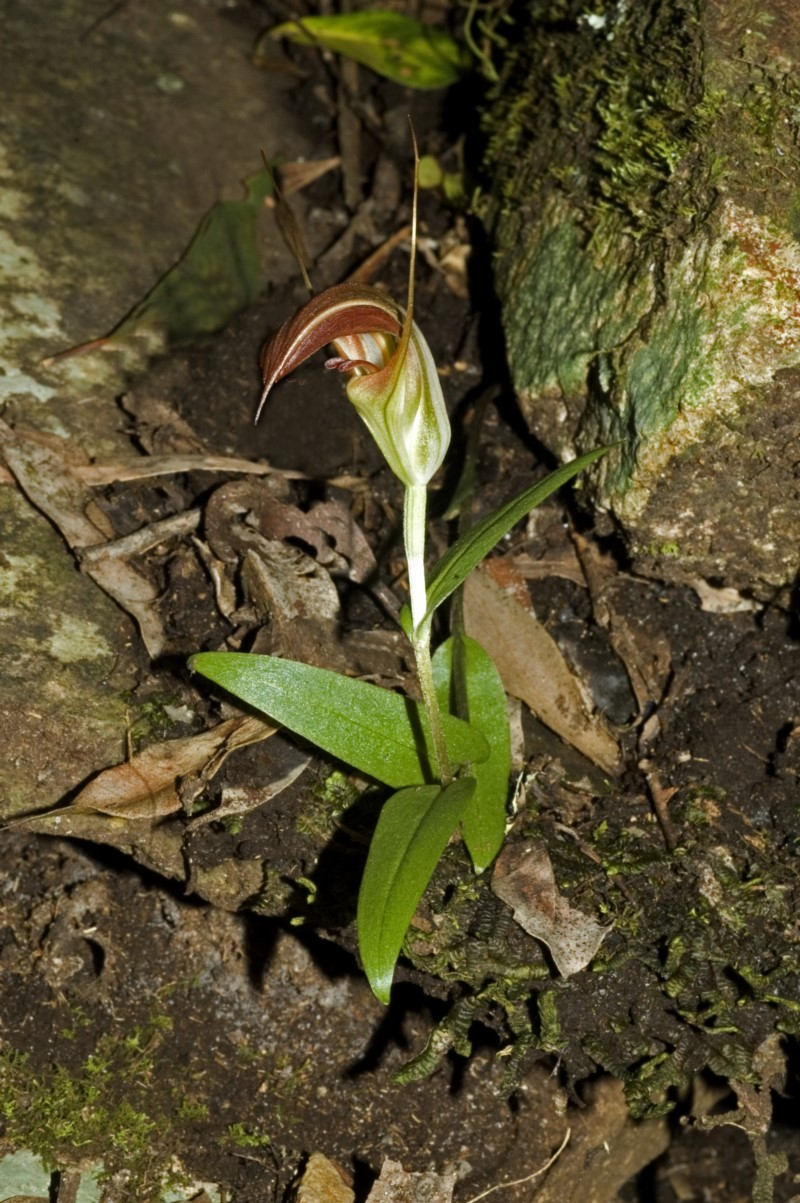

Conservation status
- Vulnerable (EPBC Act)

Scientific classification
- Kingdom: Plantae
- Clade: Tracheophytes
- Clade: Angiosperms
- Clade: Monocots
- Order: Asparagales
- Family: Orchidaceae
- Subfamily: Orchidoideae
- Tribe: Cranichideae
- Genus: Pterostylis
- Species: P. pulchella

Binomial name
- Pterostylis pulchella Messmer

Synonyms
- Diplodium pulchellum (Messmer) D.L.Jones & M.A.Clem.

= Pterostylis pulchella =

Waterfall greenhood

Species of orchid

Pterostylis pulchella, commonly known as waterfall greenhood, escarpment greenhood or pretty greenhood is a species of orchid endemic to New South Wales. As with similar greenhoods, the flowering plants differ from those that are not flowering. The non-flowering plants have a rosette of leaves flat on the ground but the flowering plants have a single flower with leaves on the flowering stem. This greenhood has a reddish-brown flower with a greenish-white base and protruding labellum with a cleft tip.

== Description ==
Pterostylis pulchella is a terrestrial, perennial, deciduous, herb with an underground tuber and when not flowering, a rosette of between three and five egg-shaped leaves lying flat on the ground. Each leaf is 10–25 mm (0.4–1 in) long and 6–15 mm (0.2–0.6 in) wide. Flowering plants have a single flower 25–35 mm (0.98–1.4 in) long and 15–18 mm (0.6–0.7 in) wide which leans slightly forwards on a flowering stem 60–150 mm (2–6 in) high with between three and five spreading stem leaves. The flowers are greenish-white near the base, reddish-brown above. The dorsal sepal and petals are fused, forming a hood or "galea" over the column, the dorsal sepal with a thread-like tip 5–12 mm (0.2–0.5 in) long. The lateral sepals are fused near their base, partly closing off the front of the flower and have erect, thread-like tips 30–35 mm (1.2–1.4 in) long. The labellum is 16–18 mm (0.6–0.7 in) long, about 4 mm (0.2 in) wide, curved, dark reddish-brown and protrudes above the sinus. Flowering occurs from February to May.

== Taxonomy and naming ==
Pterostylis pulchella was first formally described in 1933 by Pearl Messmer from a specimen collected near Fitzroy Falls. The description was published in Proceedings of the Linnean Society of New South Wales. The specific epithet (pulchella) is the diminutive form of the Latin word pulcher meaning "pretty", hence "pretty little".

== Distribution and habitat ==
Waterfall greenhood grows on cliffs near waterfalls, on moist, sheltered ridges and on mossy rocks near creeks. It is found in only five locations on the Illawarra escarpment and Southern Highlands.

== Conservation ==
Pterostylis pulchella is listed as "vulnerable" under the Australian Government Environment Protection and Biodiversity Conservation Act 1999 and the New South Wales Threatened Species Protection Act 1995. The main threat to the species is illegal collecting.
