= Kangaroo River (Shoalhaven) =

River in New South Wales, Australia

Coordinates: 34°46′S 150°18′E

Kangaroo River Budderoo Creek
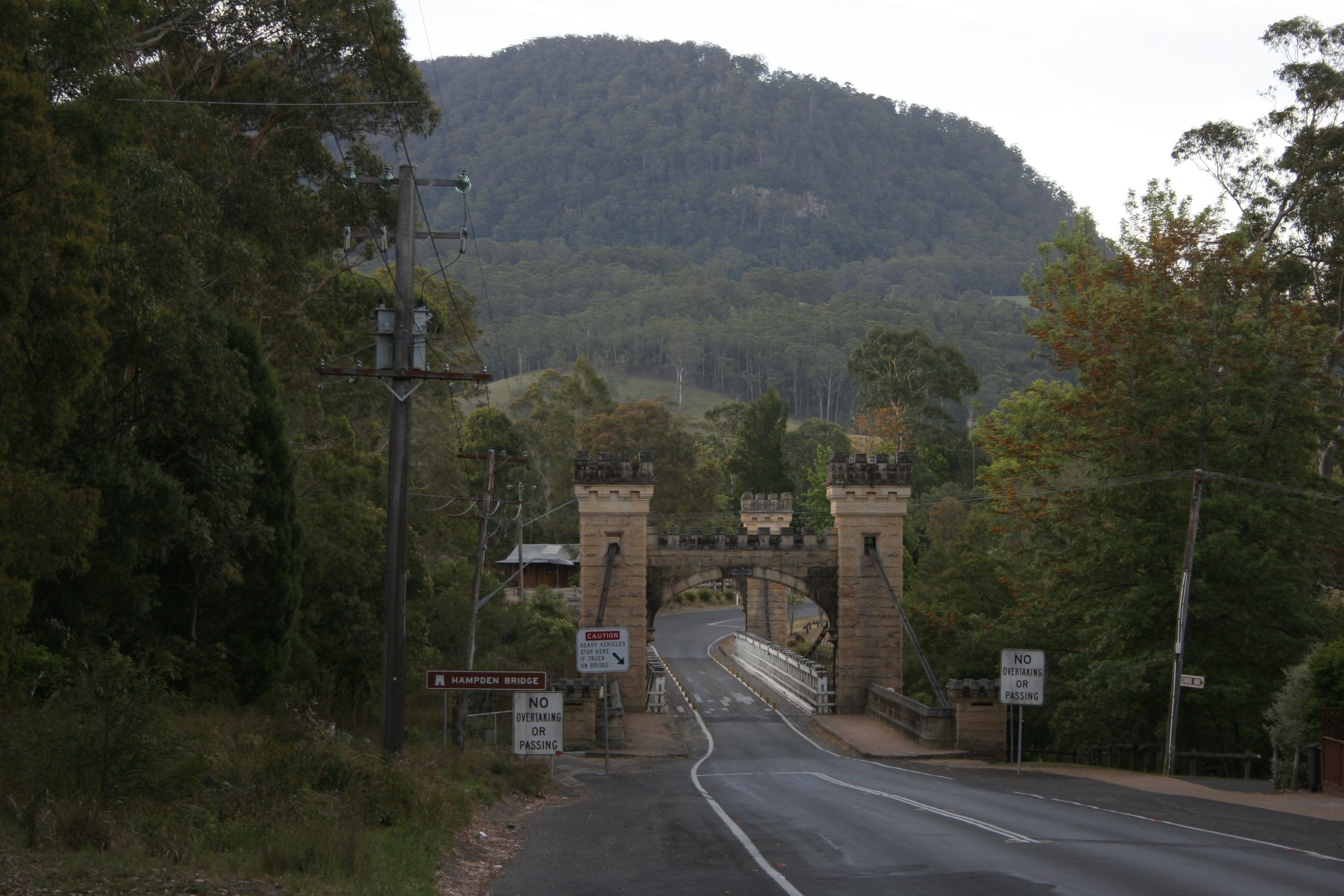
- Etymology: Named because of abundance of kangaroos

Location
- Country: Australia
- State: New South Wales
- Region: Sydney Basin (IBRA), Southern Highlands, Illawarra
- Local government area: Shoalhaven

Physical characteristics
- Source: Bells Hills, Illawarra escarpment
  - location: southeast of Robertson
  - elevation: 290 m (950 ft)
- Mouth: Shoalhaven River
  - location: near Barron Flat
  - elevation: 56 m (184 ft)
- Length: 47 km (29 mi)

Basin features
- River system: Shoalhaven River
- Tributaries
  - left: Brogers Creek
  - right: Yarrunga Creek, Bundanoon Creek
- National parks: Budderoo, Morton

The Kangaroo River is a perennial river of the Shoalhaven catchment located in the Southern Highlands and Illawarra regions of New South Wales, Australia.

The Kangaroo River, in Kangaroo Valley, is one of the few rivers that flows west before joining the Shoalhaven river to flow out to the sea.

== Location and features ==
The river rises within the Budderoo National Park about 3 kilometres (1.9 mi) north-west of Illawarra lookout. It initially flows in a north-westerly direction to Carrington Falls, where the river crosses the western escarpment of the Budderoo Plateau. The river then turns to the south-west and flows through the communities of Upper Kangaroo Valley and Kangaroo Valley, and into the Morton National Park. The river ends its course by flowing into Lake Yarrunga, a reservoir formed by the Tallowa Dam and situated just downstream of the confluence of the Shoalhaven and Kangaroo rivers. The river descends 234 metres (768 ft) over its 47 kilometres (29 mi) course.

The river is crossed by the historic Hampden Bridge in the town of Kangaroo Valley.

== See also ==
- Fitzroy Falls
- List of rivers of Australia § New South Wales
- List of rivers in New South Wales (A-K)
- Rivers of New South Wales
- Shoalhaven Scheme
