= Nowra Bridge =

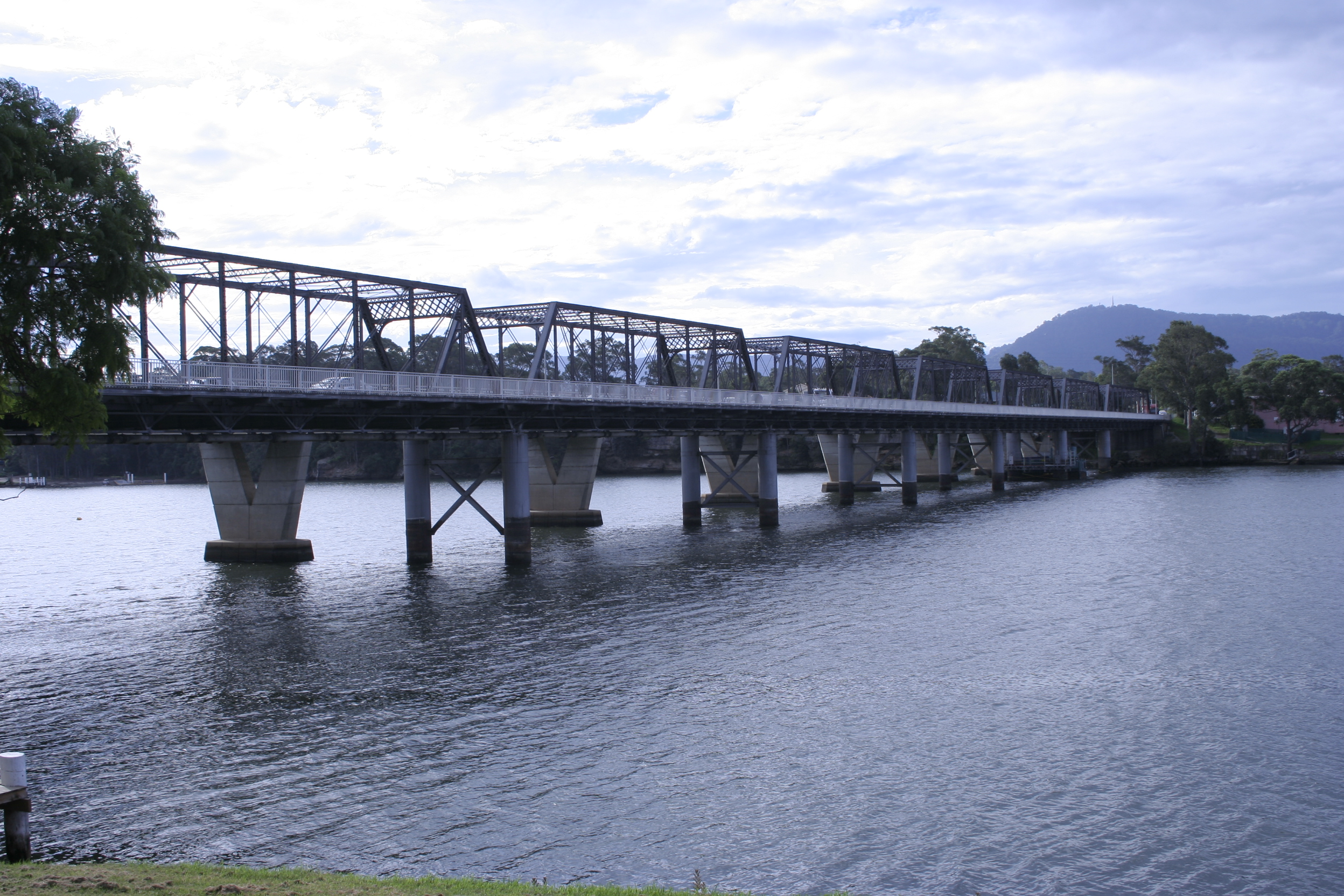
- Nowra Bridge
- Coordinates: 34°51′51″S 150°36′07″E
- Carries: Princes Highway
- Crosses: Shoalhaven River
- Locale: Nowra, New South Wales, Australia
- Begins: North Nowra (north)
- Ends: Nowra (south)
- Owner: Transport for NSW

Characteristics
- Design: Truss bridge
- Material: Steel
- Total length: 309 metres (1,013 ft)
- No. of lanes: 2

History
- Designer: Charles Shaler Smith
- Fabrication by: Edge Moor Iron Company
- Construction end: 1881
- Replaced by: Concrete bridge (concurrent use; northbound)

Statistics
- Daily traffic: 51,000 (August 2019)

New South Wales Heritage Database (Local Government Register)
- Official name: Nowra Bridge over the Shoalhaven River
- Type: Local heritage (built)
- Type: Road Bridge
- Category: Transport – Land
- Builders: Edge Moor Iron Co.

Location
- Interactive map of Nowra Bridge

The Nowra Bridge is a road bridge that carries the Princes Highway over the Shoalhaven River, at Nowra, New South Wales, Australia. The bridge joins the main area of Nowra to North Nowra and Bomaderry.

== Description ==
Despite popular mythology, the bridge was not originally intended to carry a double railway track, as part of the proposed extension of the Illawarra railway line to Jervis Bay and possibly Eden.

The bridge was designed by American engineer Charles Shaler Smith and is considered to be of local historical significance. The bridge was completed in 1881 and is built from wrought iron with a steel approach span. The bridge had a timber deck for 100 years until in 1981 reinforced concrete was laid over steel Armco decking. The pairs of cast iron piers are original and were supplied locally by the Atlas Foundry, Sydney. It was the largest bridge project in New South Wales prior to the 1889 Hawkesbury River Railway Bridge. Its full length is 342 metres (1,122 ft).

== Second bridge ==
In December 1981, a three lane concrete bridge opened to the west of the original bridge. It carried northbound traffic with the original bridge reconfigured to carry southbound traffic.

== Third bridge ==
In August 2019 Infrastructure Australia approved the construction of a new four-lane bridge immediately to the west of the existing bridges. The new bridge is the new crossing for northbound traffic. The existing northbound bridge will be converted for southbound traffic, allowing the bridge built in 1881 to be re-purposed as a pedestrian and cycle bridge. Funding to be shared between the Federal and New South Wales governments. Fulton Hogan commenced work in early 2020 and was completed in 2024. In February 2023 the new bridge opened, initially carrying traffic in both directions while the 1981 built bridge is refurbished.
