= Shoalhaven River =

River in Australia

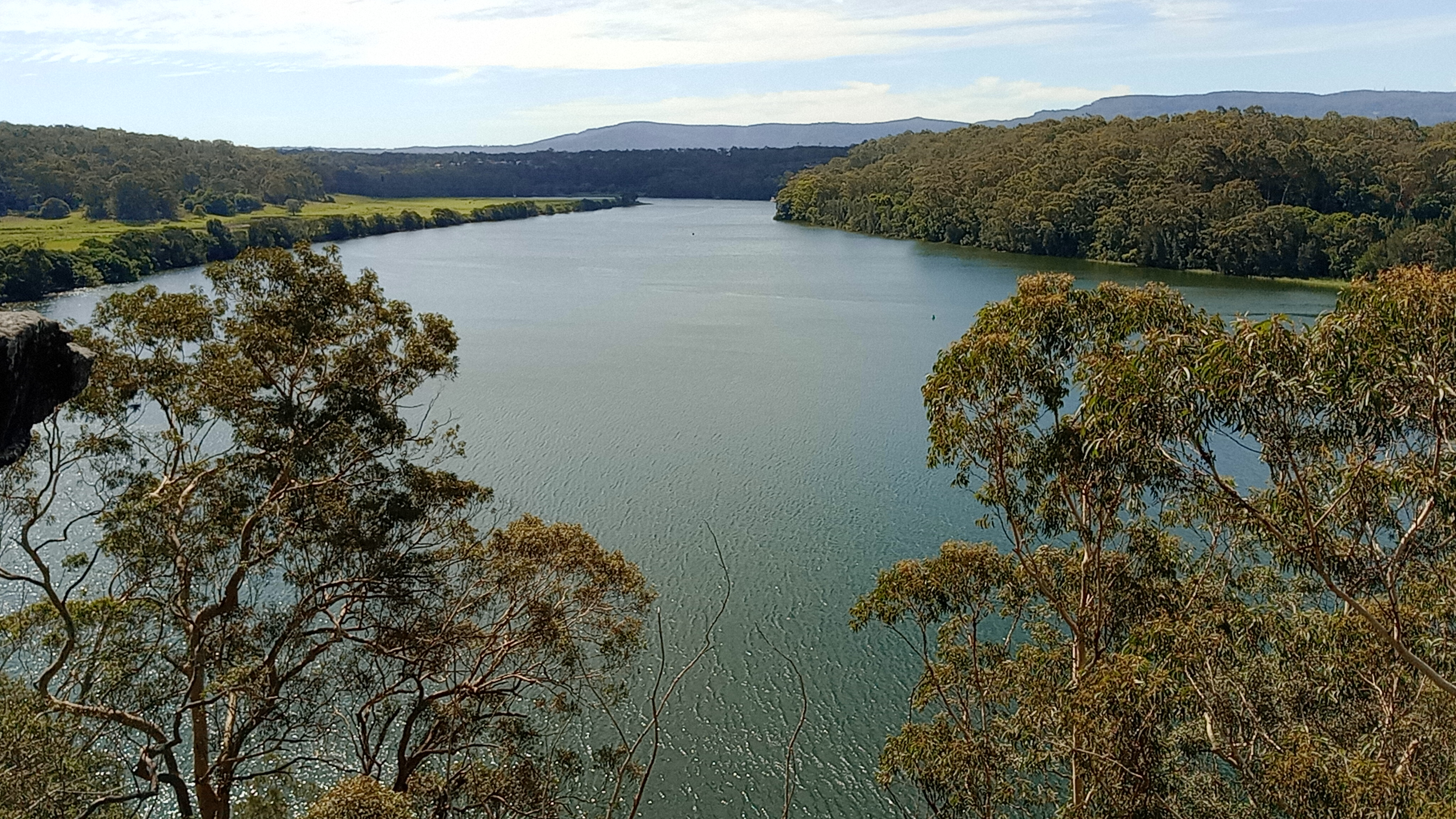
- Shoalhaven River viewed from Hanging Rock Lookout in Nowra, December 2024.

- Location of the Shoalhaven River mouth in New South Wales
- Etymology: "Shoals Haven" (Bass in 1797).

Location
- Country: Australia
- State: New South Wales
- Region: Sydney Basin (IBRA), Southern Tablelands, South Coast
- LGAs: Queanbeyan–Palerang, Shoalhaven
- Cities: Nowra, Bomaderry

Physical characteristics
- Source: Euranbene Mountain, Great Dividing Range
  - location: west of Bendethera
  - coordinates: 35°58′15″S 149°38′3″E
  - elevation: 864 m (2,835 ft)
- Mouth: Tasman Sea, Pacific Ocean
  - location: Shoalhaven Heads
  - coordinates: 34°51′S 150°44′E
  - elevation: 0 m (0 ft)
- Length: 327 km (203 mi)
- Basin size: 7,086 km^{2} (2,736 mi^{2})
- Discharge
  - location: Near mouth
  - average: 63.1 m^{3}/s (1,990 GL/a)

Basin features
- Tributaries
  - left: Kangaroo River
  - right: Mongarlowe River, Corang River, Endrick River
- Islands: Pig (Burraga), Comerong

The Shoalhaven River is a perennial river that rises from the Southern Tablelands and flows into an open mature wave dominated barrier estuary near Nowra on the South Coast of New South Wales, Australia.

== Location and features ==
The Shoalhaven River rises on the eastern side of the Great Dividing Range, below Euranbene Mountain, about 350 kilometres (220 mi) southwest of Sydney. The upper reaches of the river flow northwards through an upland pastoral district near the town of Braidwood. The river works its way down into a remote canyon east of Goulburn and emerges into the coastal lowlands at Nowra in the Shoalhaven district, where it is spanned by the Nowra Bridge. The river is joined by thirty-four tributaries, including the Mongarlowe, Corang, Endrick, and Kangaroo rivers, and descends 864 metres (2,835 ft) over its 327-kilometre (203 mi) course.

=== Berrys Canal ===
The estuary has two entrances, approximately 5 kilometres (3.1 mi) apart, that flow into the Shoalhaven Bight within the Tasman Sea of the Pacific Ocean. The southern entrance is located at Crookhaven Heads and is permanently open. The Shoalhaven River flows south via Berrys Canal to Greenwell Point, where it is joined by the Crookhaven River and then flows east past Orient Point into the bight, north of Culburra. The Berrys Canal between the Shoalhaven and the Crookhaven was constructed in June 1822 by convicts overseen by Hamilton Hume under the direction of Alexander Berry to facilitate ship transport to the original European settlement located in the region. The construction of the canal formed Comerong Island. The canal was dug using own hand tools, and was the first land navigable canal in Australia. Berrys Canal remains one of two navigable canals in New South Wales, the other being the Alexandra Canal.

The northern entrance is located south of Shoalhaven Heads, and is open intermittently, at times of peak flow and during flood events.

=== Use for water supply ===
Tallowa Dam is the only major dam on the Shoalhaven, and is a part of the Shoalhaven Scheme. It impounds the river's lower reaches to form Lake Yarrunga and part of Sydney's water supply. Some water is pumped out of the lake and over the Southern Highlands into Lake Burragorang. A much larger water storage at Welcome Reef on the upper Shoalhaven was proposed in 1980 in a report by the Snowy Mountains Engineering Corporation, and scrapped in 2001 by the then NSW Minister for the Environment Bob Debus.

=== Environment ===
The Shoalhaven River and its main tributary the Kangaroo River were once renowned as an Australian bass fishery. Unfortunately, Tallowa Dam has been a potent barrier to migratory native fish with estuarine/marine juvenile stages, blocking species including Australian bass from more than 80% of their former range in the Shoalhaven system. Recent stockings of hatchery-bred Bass in Lake Yarrunga are an attempt to remediate the situation. A fishway for Tallowa Dam was completed in August 2009. This fishway is designed to allow for the movement of bass and other native fish over the dam. Lake Yarrunga has also suffered the illegal introduction of highly damaging European carp, which are now present in high densities.

== History ==
=== Indigenous history ===
The traditional custodians of the land are Jerrinja tribal peoples the surrounding Shoalhaven River, in its lower reaches, are the Aboriginal peoples of the lower catchment are Jerrinja tribal peoples which are the traditional custodians of the Shoalhaven . Some of the culturally important Aboriginal places in the Shoalhaven include Coolangatta Mountain, Bundarwa (Beecroft Headland), Cambewarra Mountain, Didthul or Pigeon House Mountain, Kangaroo Valley, Burrill Lake, and Murramarang Aboriginal Area and its environs.

The upper part of the Shoalhaven river, in the district around modern-day Braidwood, is the traditional land of Walbanga people.

=== European history ===
The explorer and navigator George Bass found the entrance to the Shoalhaven River during his whaleboat voyage down the south coast of New South Wales in 1797. He gave the name Shoals Haven to the river (now known as the Crookhaven River) because of the shoals of mud and sand he found at the river mouth.

Approximately 20 kilometres (12 mi) west of Nowra are a series of properties along the banks of the Shoalhaven River that were a gift to the people of Australia from Arthur Boyd, his wife, Yvonne, and the Boyd family. Entrusted to the Bundanon Trust, along with further gifts by Boyd, including copyright of all of his artwork, these properties provide an environment that promotes visual arts, writing, music and other performing arts, and the promotion of education and research in the arts.

== Crossings ==
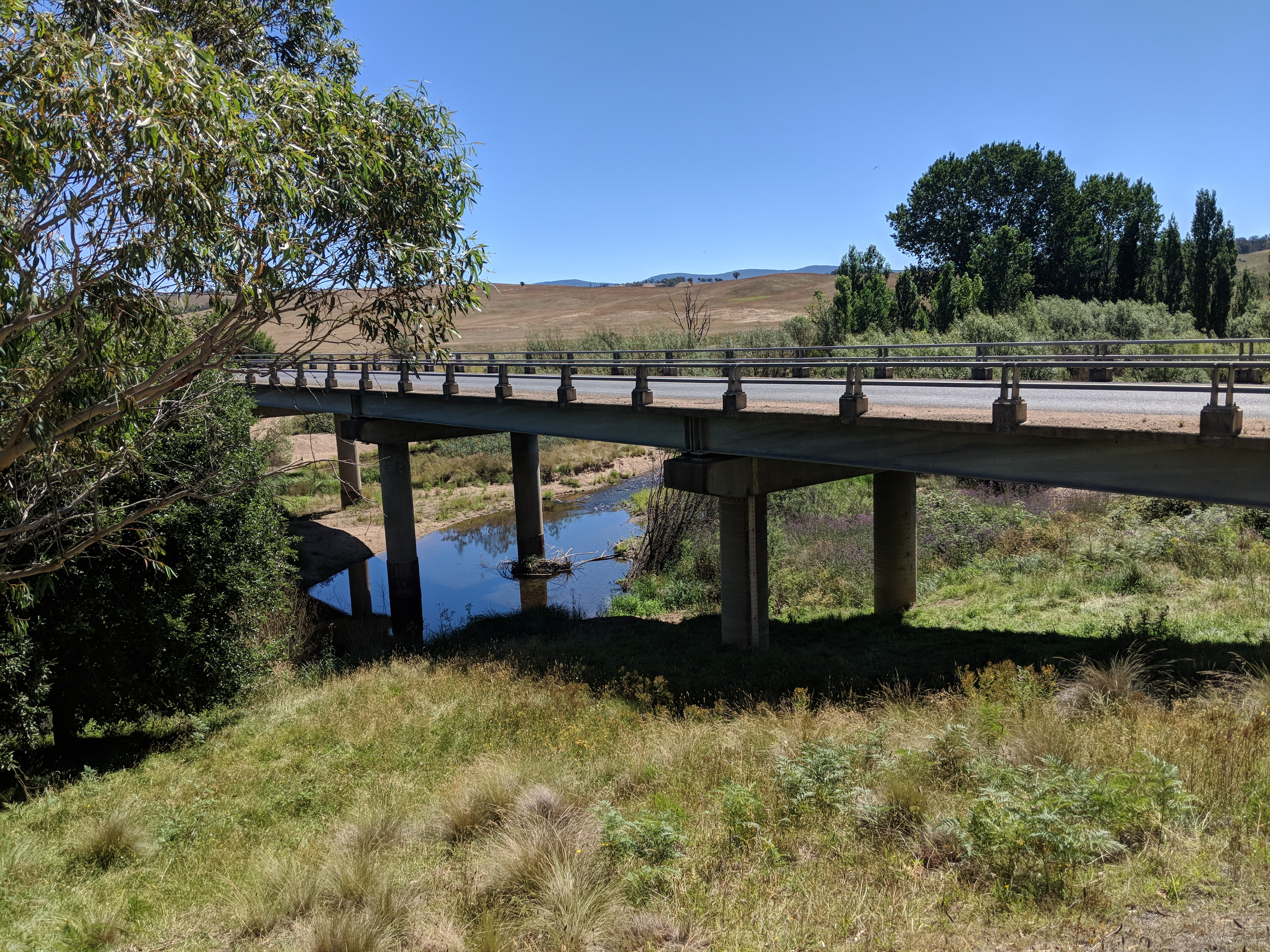
Ballalaba bridge on the Braidwood–Cooma Road

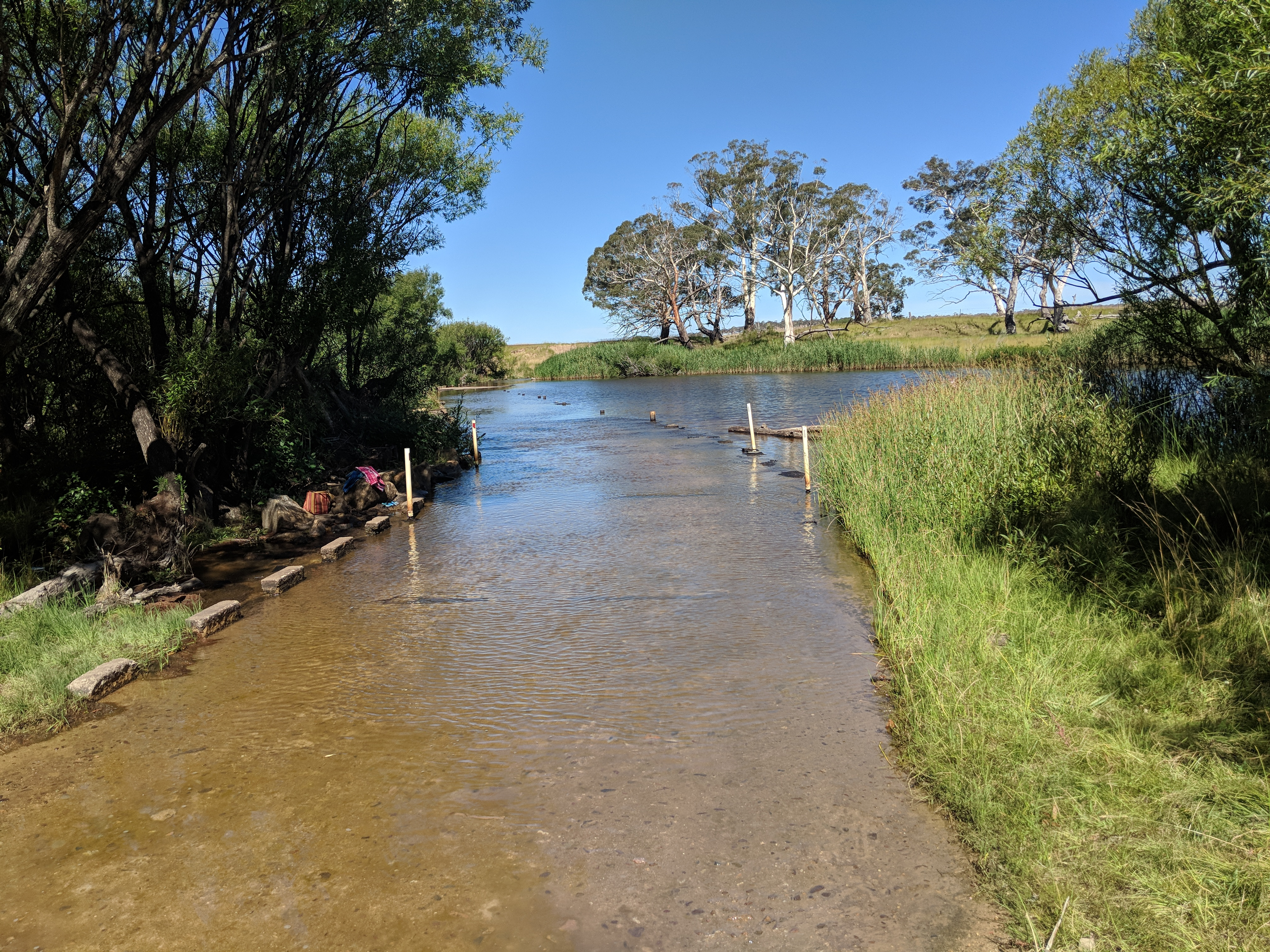
Farringdon Crossing

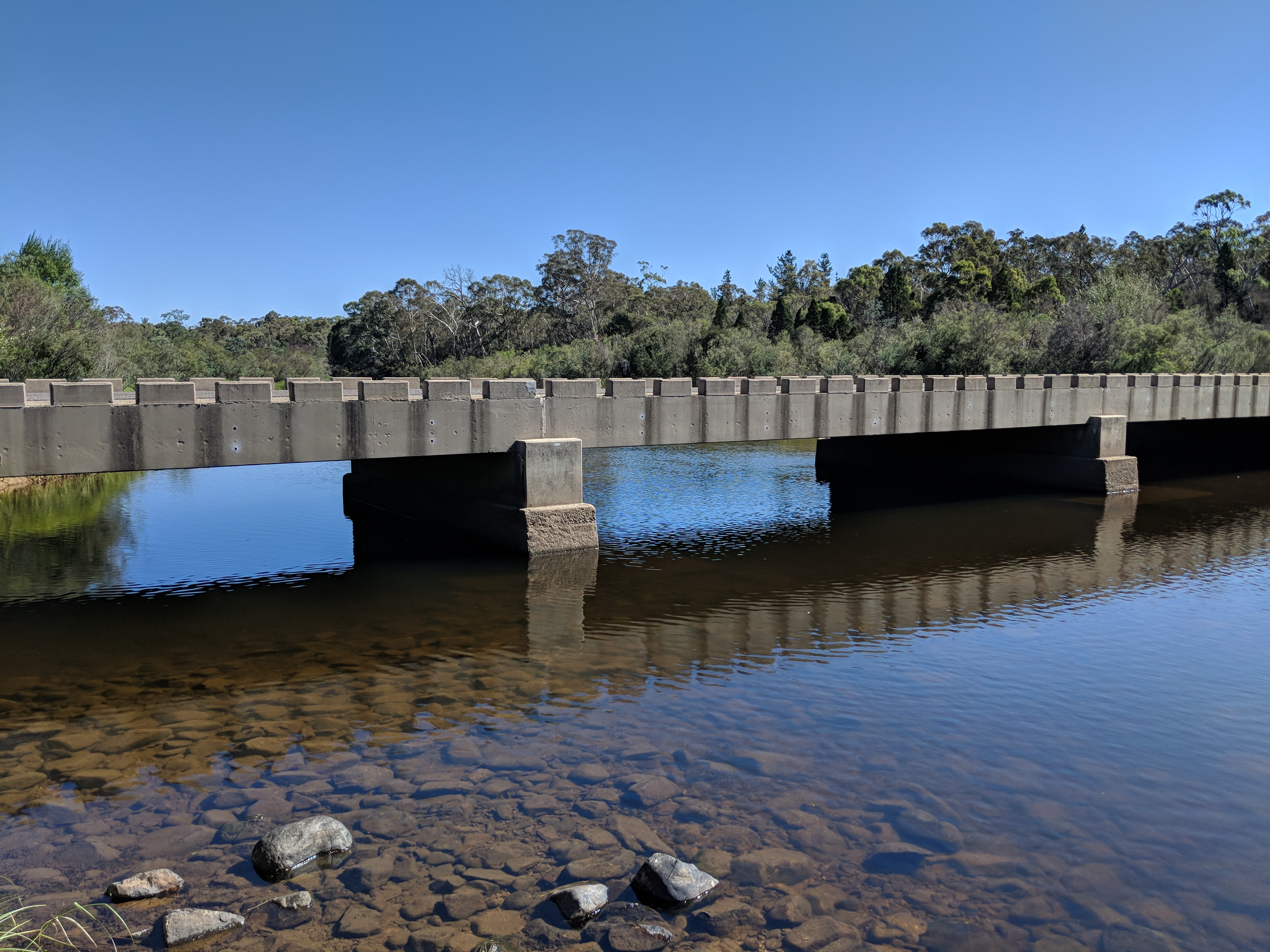
Bombay Bridge

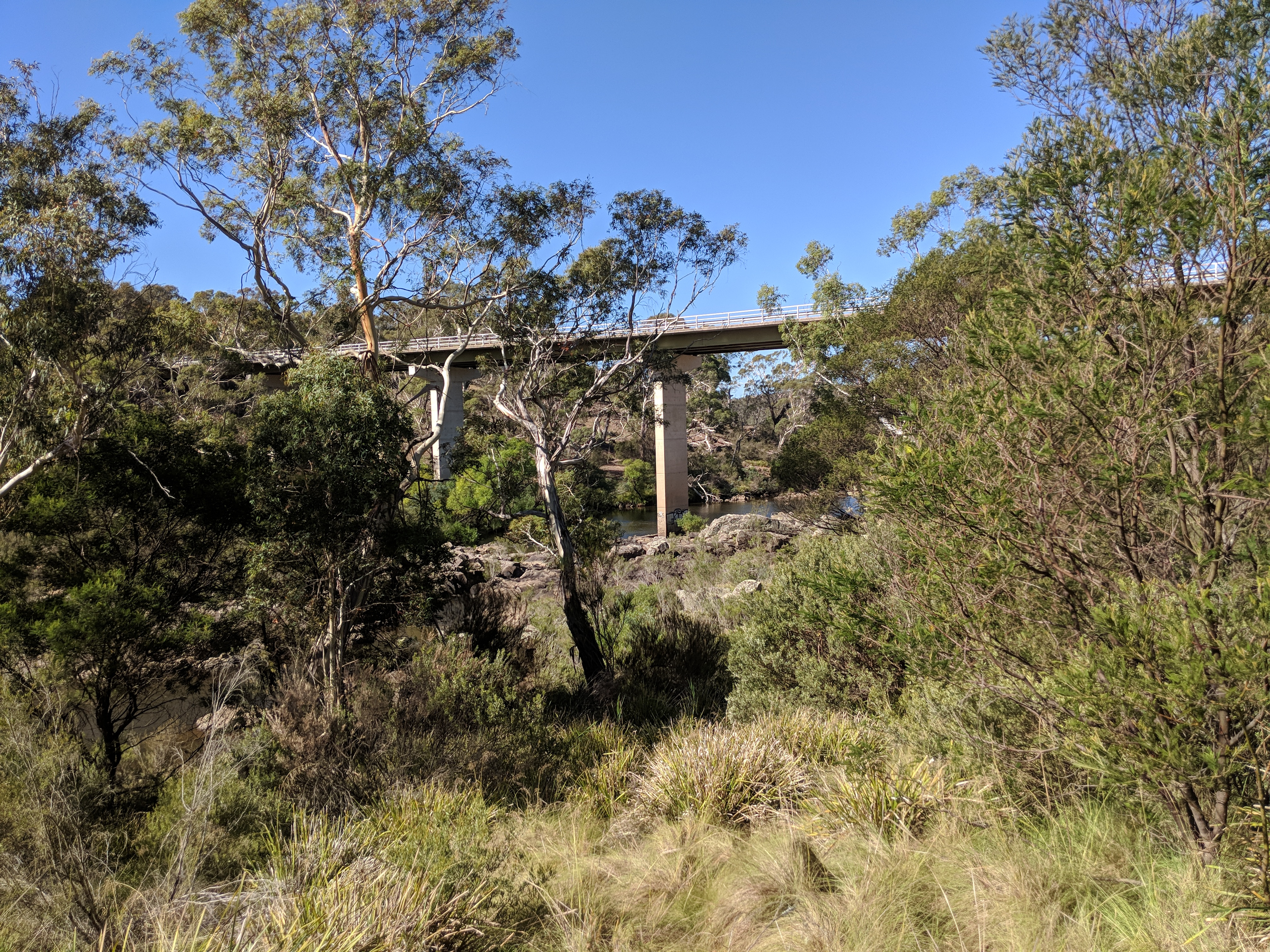
Warri Bridge on the Kings Highway

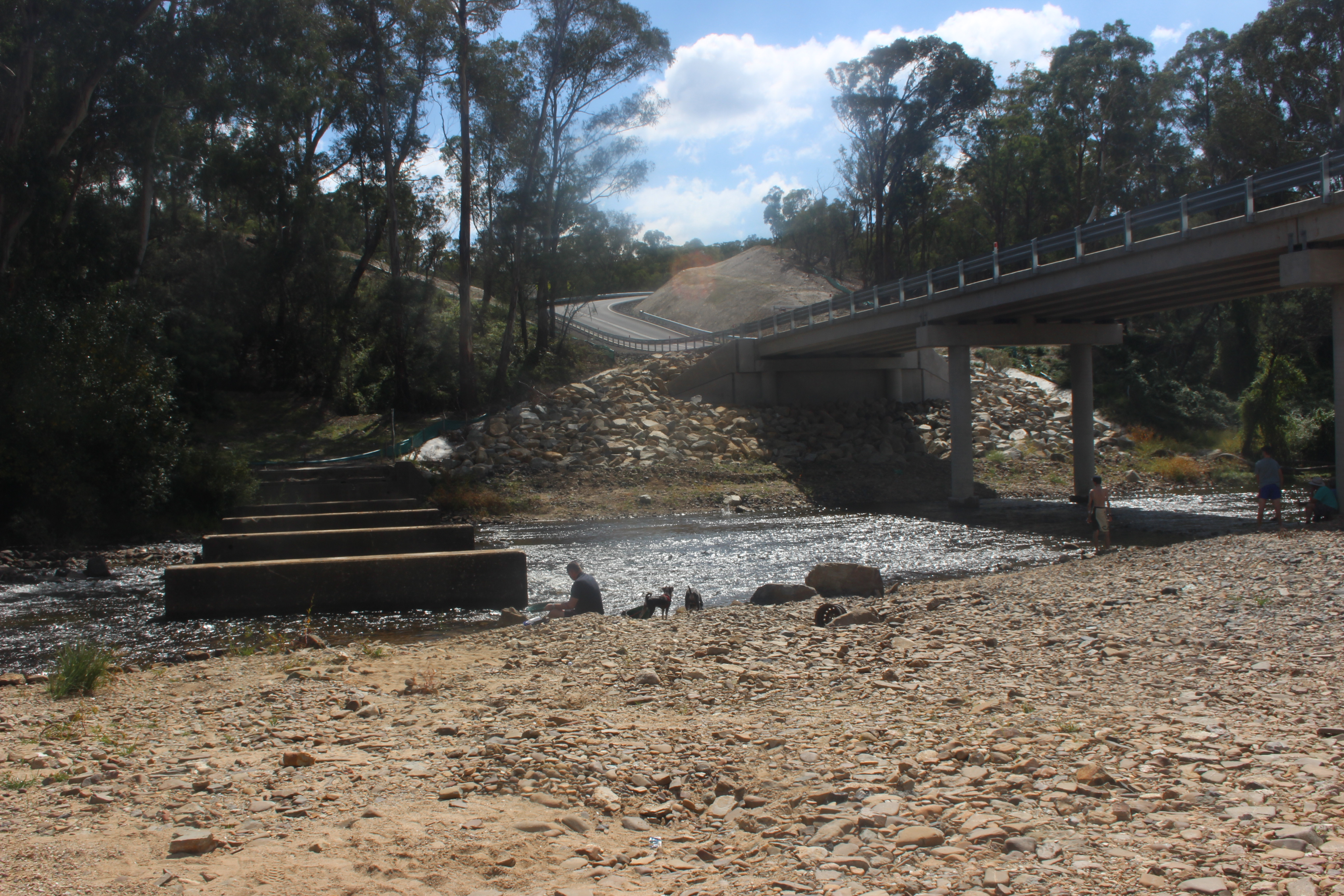
New Bridge and remains of old bridge at Oallen Ford

The river crossings, from its headwaters to its river mouth, include:

- Ballalaba bridge
- Farringdon crossing between Farringdon and Bendoura
- Bombay bridge
- Warri Bridge carries the Kings Highway, near Braidwood. A bridge at this location was first opened on 23 September 1874, and later replaced by the current structure.
- Stewart's Crossing is a ford on Stewart's Crossing Road.
- Oallen Crossing was formerly a flood-prone single-lane timber bridge with a low-level concrete floodway for the Oallen Ford Road at Oallen Ford, near Nerriga, constructed in 1936. The timber bridge and floodway has been replaced by a longer higher concrete bridge crossing slightly downstream, around mid-2015. The new crossing is designed to permit higher speed travel and eliminates some sharp bends on the western side of the river and only to be overtopped by much deeper 1:20-year flood events.
- Nowra Bridge carries the Princes Highway between Bomaderry and Nowra.
- Comerong Island Ferry carries vehicles and pedestrians to Comerong Island near the river mouth.

Historically, there was once a ford crossing at the former village of Larbert.

== Gallery ==
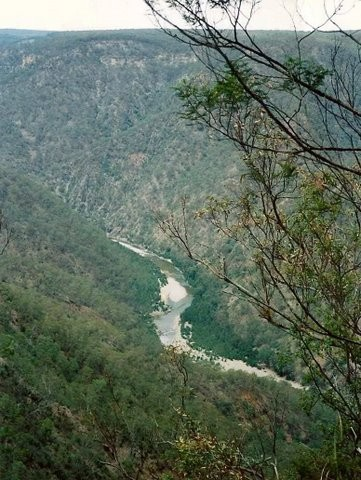
Shoalhaven River Gorge, near Bundanoon

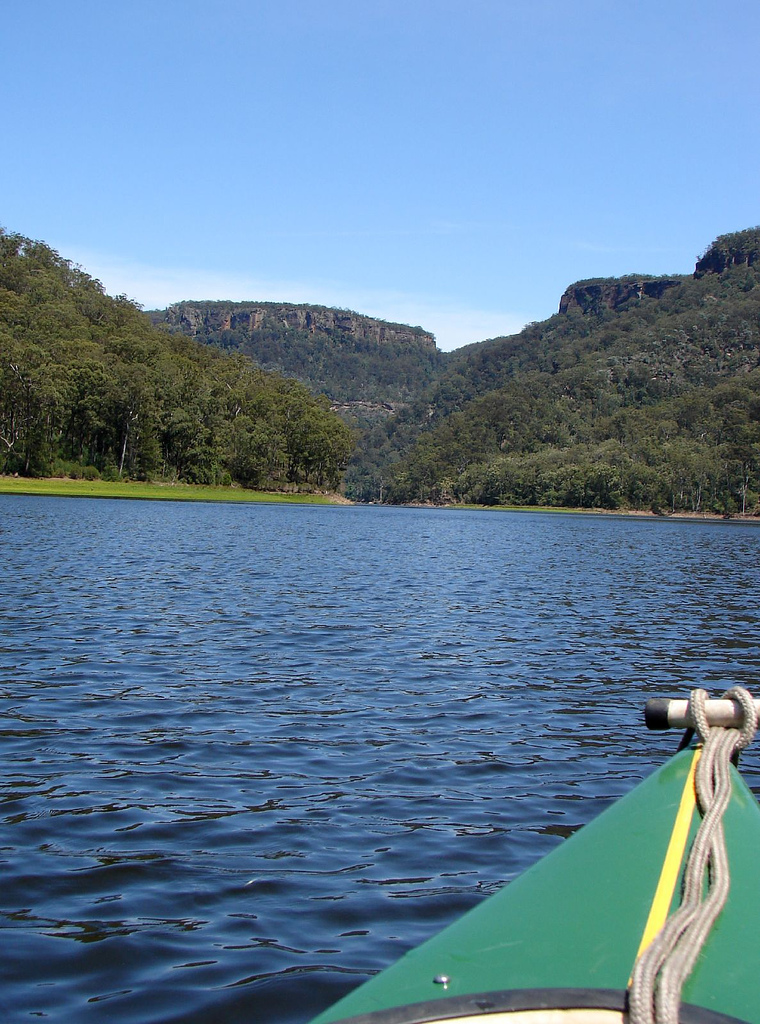
Shoalhaven River, near Nowra

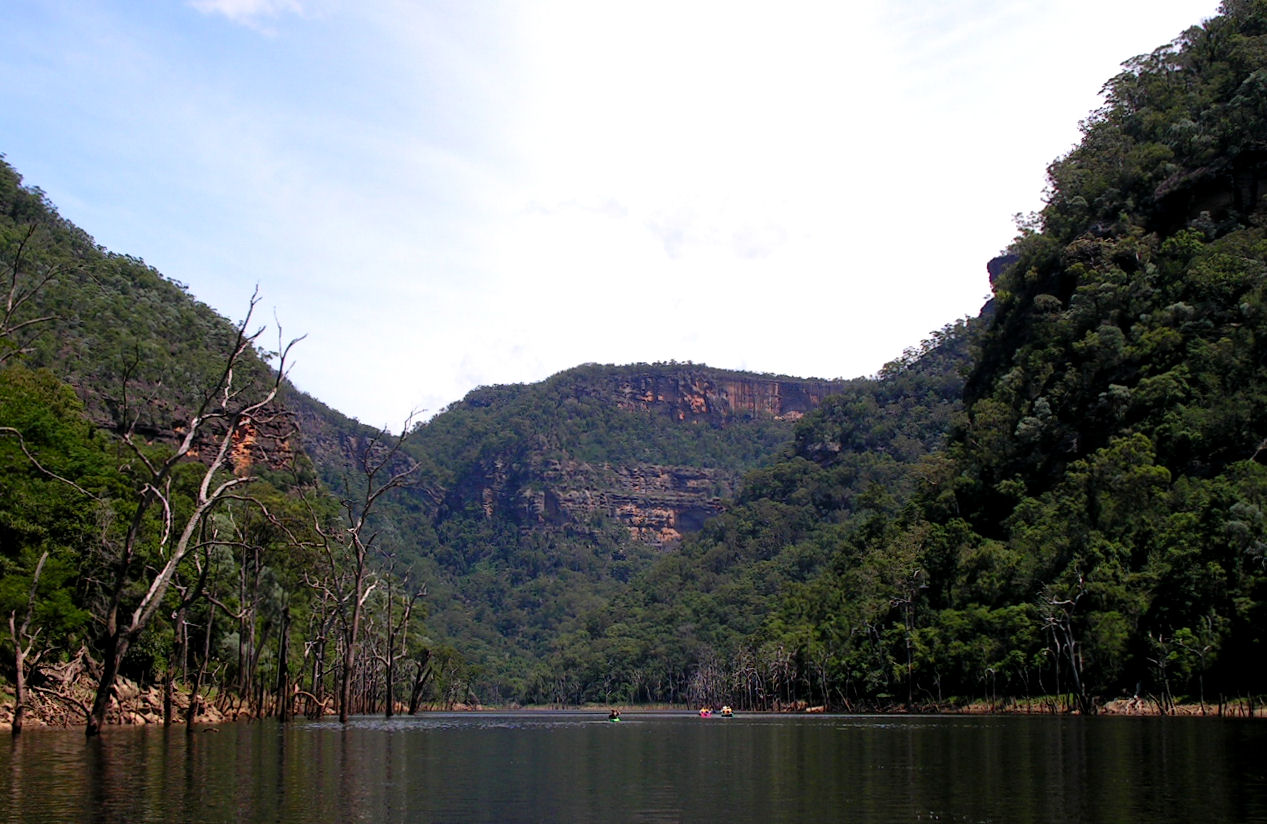
With paddlers

== See also ==
- List of rivers of Australia § New South Wales
- List of rivers in New South Wales (L-Z)
- Morton National Park
- Rivers of New South Wales
- Shoalhaven Scheme
