= Yarrunga, New South Wales =

Coordinates: 34°34′54″S 150°26′05″E

Yarrunga is a small village on Nowra Road in the Southern Highlands of New South Wales, Australia, in Wingecarribee Shire. It lies north of the Meryla Flora Reserve. It was previously known as North Yarrunga, before the original settlement of Yarrunga was renamed Fitzroy Falls in the 1850s.
