= Carrington Falls =

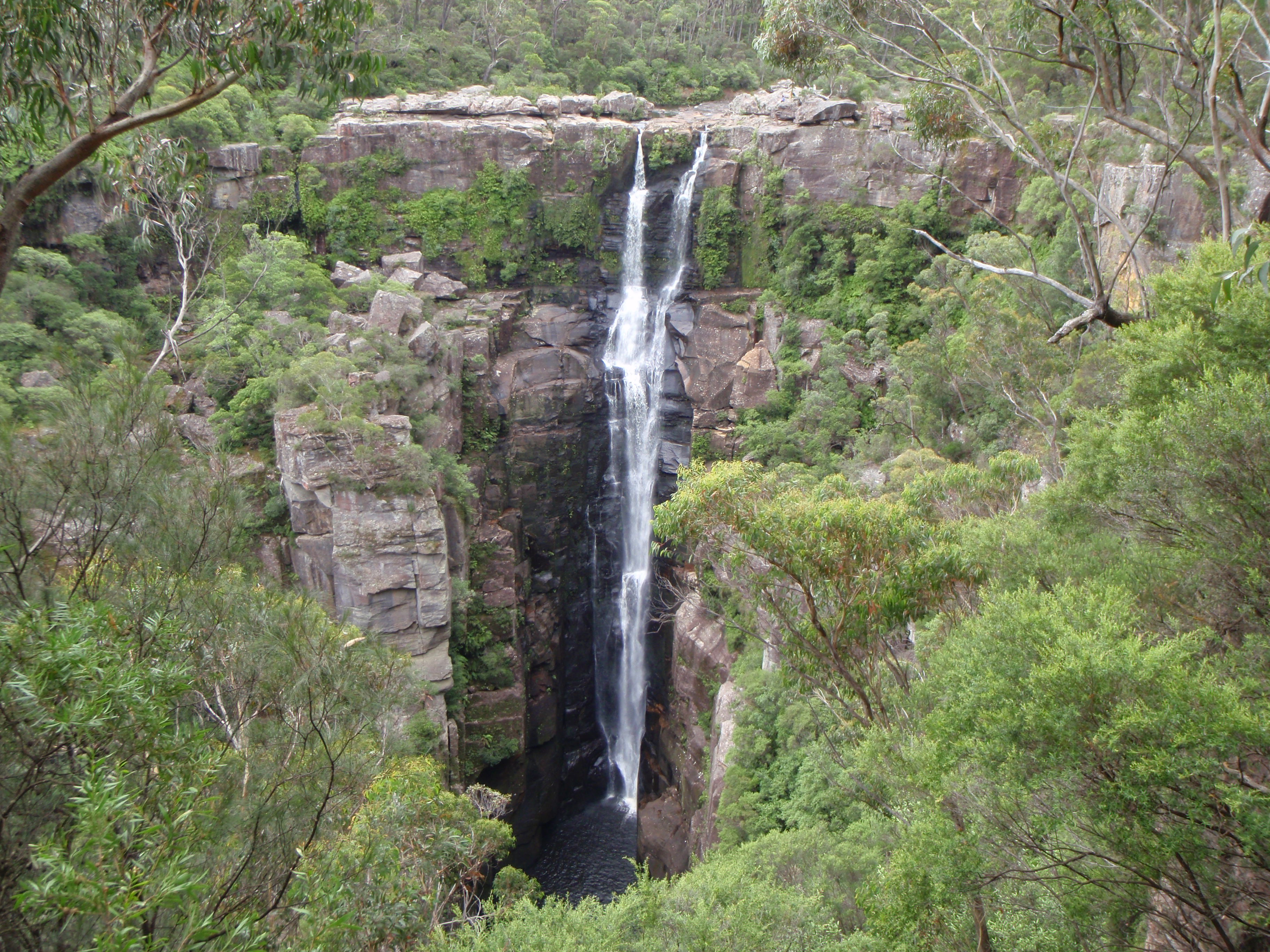
- Carrington Falls

- Location within New South Wales
- Location: Southern Highlands, New South Wales, Australia
- Coordinates: 34°37′28″S 150°39′17″E
- Type: Plunge
- Elevation: 542 metres (1,778 ft)
- Total height: 130–160 metres (430–520 ft)
- Watercourse: Kangaroo River

The Carrington Falls is a plunge waterfall across the Kangaroo River located in the Southern Highlands region of New South Wales, Australia.

== Location and features ==
The falls are situated where the river crosses the western escarpment of the Budderoo Plateau to descend to the Kangaroo Valley. Located seven kilometres (four miles) east-southeast of Robertson, the falls are protected within the Budderoo National Park, at an approximate elevation of 542 metres (1,778 ft) above sea level and descend approximately 130–160 metres (430–520 ft) from the plateau to the valley floor.

The recreation facilities near the top of the waterfall were severely damaged by a bushfire in May 2016 and remained closed for repair until December 2018. The recreation facilities (Thomas Place picnic area) and three eastern lookouts were reopened to the public in January 2019.

A noticeboard at the site reads as follows:

The Settlers of Carrington Falls: Surveyor Robert Hoddle surveyed a track from Bong Bong to Kiama in 1830 cutting through the once thick rainforest known as Yarrawa Brush. The township of Robertson developed after the passing of the Robertson Land Act 1861 which encourage people to settle in the area.
Carrington characters: Creating a dynasty: John Missingham and his wife Mary moved from Jamberoo Valley to Carrington Falls in the 1880s. Work was difficult to find but John eventually got a job in Robertson building fences and horse yards. Uneducated but ambitious, John took bold steps to improve his situation. Determined to learn to read and write, John would walk ten miles to attend night school at the local teacher's house in Robertson. As his schooling progressed, John became a compulsive reader and developed one of the most comprehensive libraries in the region. To ensure that the Missingham children (all eight of them) gained from his endeavours, John and Mary provided accommodation for the local teacher and a schoolroom in their house. Their home also doubled as a church once a month. John Missingham was active in the community – elected as councillor for the Wingecarribee Shire Council and a member of several local committees. He also developed a passion for the bushland around Carrington Falls and was a member of the first trust.
Working the mill; A hazardous living: In the early 1900s John Missingham purchased a timber mill at Carrington Falls and established his sawmilling business. He mainly logged on private property but eventually secured a crown licence to remove suitable timber from the surrounding forests. Most of the timber removed was hardwood (eucalyptus) – used for building houses in the area. "They logged what they needed, employing local men using bullock teams to cart the logs to the mill". Until the 1940s bullock team hauled the logs along the escarpment edge to the mill. It was very risky business particularly difficult moving up and down steep escarpments along rough, boggy tracks. The bullocks were eventually replaced by trucks, but conditions were still fairly hazardous. Four generations of Missinghams worked the family sawmill until its closure in the 1980s.

== Locality ==
The locality of Carrington Falls is defined as a suburb of the Municipality of Kiama, "situated near the Kangaroo River about 6.5 km E of Upper Kangaroo Valley". At the 2021 census, it had a population of 32.

== See also ==
- List of waterfalls
- List of waterfalls of New South Wales
