= Shoalhaven Scheme =

Water and hydroelectric plant for New South Wales, Australia

The Shoalhaven Scheme is a dual-purpose water supply and Pumped-storage Hydroelectricity scheme located on the South Coast region of New South Wales, Australia.

The Scheme was built as a joint project between the Electricity Commission of NSW and the NSW Metropolitan Water Sewerage and Drainage Board. Management has subsequently passed to Origin Energy and the Sydney Catchment Authority.

== Water supply ==
Water in the scheme is stored in three principal dams and their associated reservoirs: Tallowa Dam, Fitzroy Falls Dam and Wingecarribee Dam. Wingecarribee River is a tributary of Warragamba River, so water pumped into Wingecarribee Reservoir can be released into Warragamba Dam and hence the Sydney water supply. Water can also be released into Nepean Dam via a system of rock cuttings and tunnels known as Glenquarry Cut. Water from the Nepean Dam can be transferred to Sydney, or to Wollongong via Avon Dam.

== Power generation ==
In addition to its water supply capabilities which supplements water supplies to the Sydney area, the Shoalhaven Scheme also comprises two hydro-power facilities, with total generating capacity of 240 megawatts (320,000 hp). The flexibility of the scheme is that it can operate as either a pump or a generator. During off peak periods, it utilises excess electricity from the grid to pump water back up to the reservoir(s) as pumped storage. The two power stations are: The Kangaroo Valley and Bendeela power stations were completed in 1977 as a joint project between the Electricity Commission of New South Wales and the NSW Metropolitan Water Sewerage and Drainage Board. Management has subsequently been passed from those bodies to Origin Energy and the Sydney Catchment Authority.

=== Kangaroo Valley Power Station ===
Kangaroo Valley Power Station in the Kangaroo Valley has two 80-megawatt (110,000 hp) pump turbines, for a total electricity generating capacity of 160 megawatts (210,000 hp). From Bendeela Pondage, the Kangaroo Valley Pumping and Power Station lifts water a further 480 metres (1,570 ft) to Fitzroy Falls Reservoir via a tunnel, shaft, pipeline, and canal. Water available for hydro-electric power generation is discharged back down the conduits, driving turbines as it returns to Bendeela Pondage and then Lake Yarrunga.

=== Bendeela Pondage ===
Bendeela Pondage, completed in 1972, is an earth and rockfill embankment dam structure located above the Bendeela Hydroelectric Pumped Storage Power Station on the Shoalhaven River / Kangaroo River which both go into the Tallowa Dam and the Kangaroo Valley Hydroelectric Pumped Storage Power Station. It's a small storage buffer dam for between the two Pumped-storage Hydroelectric Power Station's.

=== Bendeela Power Station ===
Bendeela Power Station has two 40-megawatt (54,000 hp) pump turbines, for a total of 80 megawatts (110,000 hp) of electricity generating capacity. Bendeela Pumping and Power Station, located on the Kangaroo River arm of Lake Yarrunga, lifts water 127 metres (417 ft) to Bendeela Pondage.

== Environmental consequences ==
The Shoalhaven River and its main tributary the Kangaroo River. Tallowa Dam has been a barrier to migratory native fish with estuarine/marine juvenile stages, blocking species including Australian bass from more than 80% of their former range in the Shoalhaven system. Stockings of hatchery bred bass in Lake Yarrunga has been an attempt to remediate the situation. A fishway for Tallowa Dam has been discussed for more than 20 years but was not constructed until 2009. Lake Yarrunga also contains exotic species such as carp, which are now present in high densities. A fish lift began operation in August 2009.

== See also ==
- List of reservoirs and dams in Australia
