= Wingecarribee Dam =

Dam in New South Wales, Australia

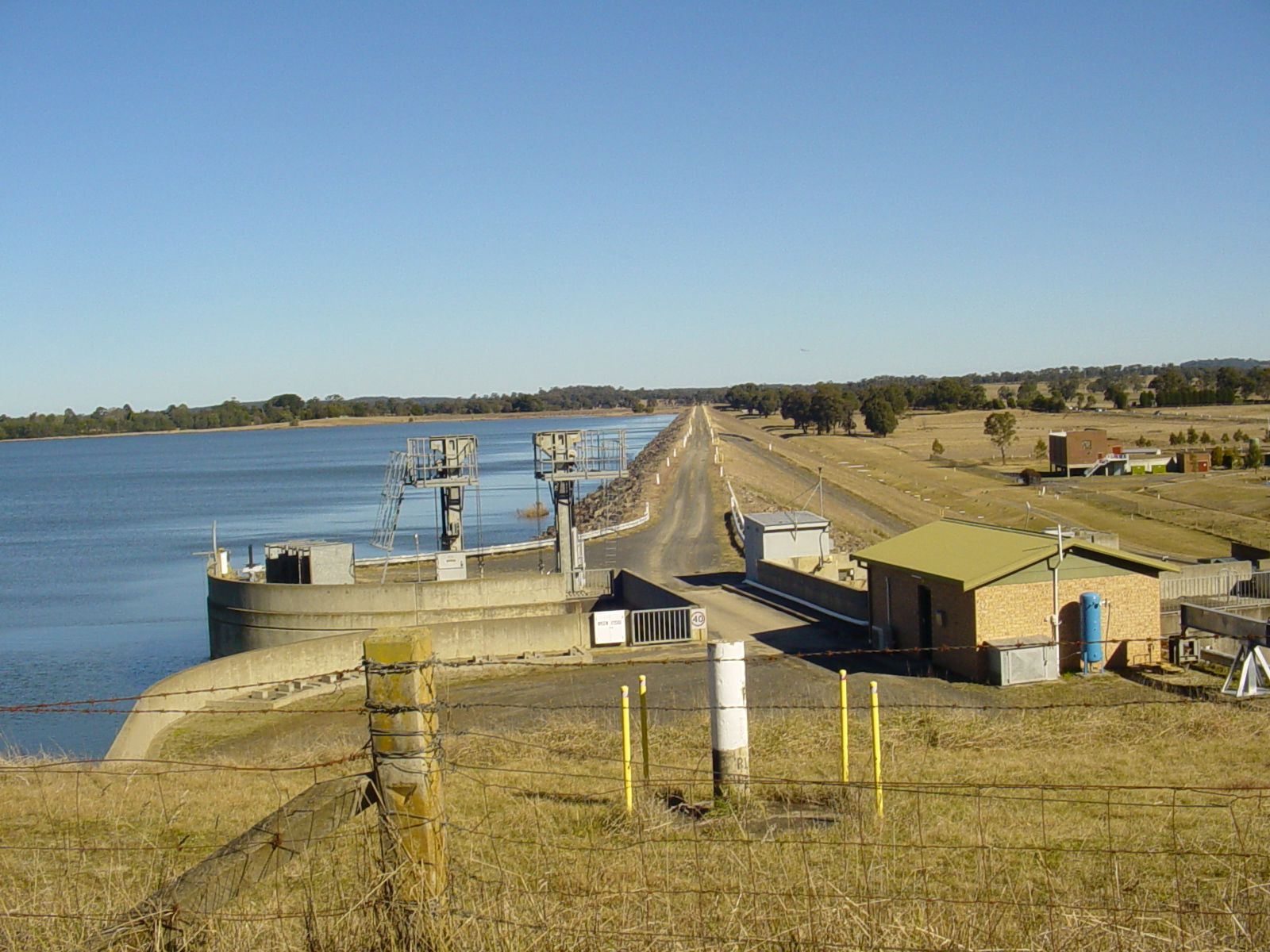
- The dam wall and reservoir, 2010

- Location of the dam in New South Wales
- Interactive map of Wingecarribee Dam
- Coordinates: 34°32′39″S 150°28′48″E
- Purpose: Irrigation
- Status: Operational
- Opening date: 1974

Dam and spillways
- Type of dam: Embankment dam; Gravity dam
- Impounds: Wingecarribee River
- Height: 19 m (62 ft)
- Length: 1,140 m (3,740 ft)
- Dam volume: 573×10^{3} m^{3} (20.2×10^{6} cu ft)
- Spillways: 2
- Spillway type: Controlled
- Spillway capacity: 520 m^{3}/s (18,000 cu ft/s)

Reservoir
- Creates: Wingecarribee Reservoir
- Total capacity: 25,875 ML (20,977 acre⋅ft)
- Catchment area: 40 km^{2} (15 sq mi)
- Surface area: 625 ha (1,540 acres)
- Website sca.nsw.gov.au

The Wingecarribee Dam is an earth and rock-fill embankment dam across the Wingecarribee River, located approximately 15 kilometres (9.3 mi) southeast of Bowral in New South Wales, Australia. Completed in 1974 as part of the Shoalhaven Scheme, the resultant reservoir is Wingecarribee Reservoir.

== Overview ==
The embankment is 19 metres (62 ft) high and 1,140 metres (3,740 ft) long. When full, the reservoir has a capacity of 25,875 megalitres (20,977 acre⋅ft) and has a surface area of 625 hectares (1,540 acres), drawn from a catchment area of 40 square kilometres (15 sq mi). The spillway has a discharge capacity of 520 cubic metres per second (18,000 cu ft/s).

The Wingecarribee Reservoir lost around 9,000 megalitres (7,300 acre⋅ft) of storage capacity as a result of the inflow of peat from the Wingecarribee Swamp collapse in August 1998. The original storage capacity was 34,500 megalitres (28,000 acre⋅ft).

The dam has two outlets, the usual main controlled spillway flowing into the Wingecarribee River which feeds the Warragamba Dam system, and an added extra sluice system known as the Glenquarry Cut, a gravity dam, which feeds into the Glenquarry Creek and then the Nepean River.

== See also ==
- List of reservoirs and dams in New South Wales
