= Budderoo National Park =

National park in New South Wales, Australia

- IUCN category II (national park)
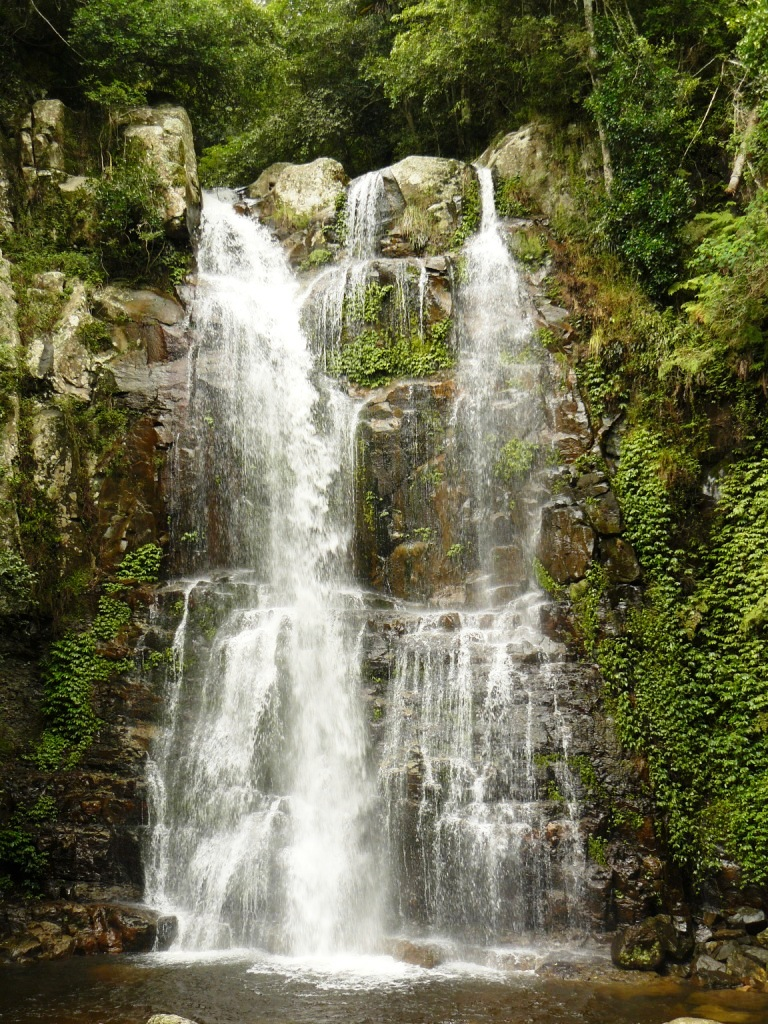
- Minnamurra Falls

- Location within New South Wales
- Location: New South Wales
- Nearest city: Wollongong
- Coordinates: 34°39′59″S 150°39′27″E
- Area: 7,219 ha (27.87 sq mi)
- Established: 3 October 1986
- Governing body: National Parks & Wildlife Service
- Website: https://www.nationalparks.nsw.gov.au/visit-a-park/parks/budderoo-national-park

The Budderoo National Park is a 7,219-hectare (17,840-acre) national park which is located in the Illawarra region of New South Wales, Australia and is situated approximately 99 kilometres (62 mi) south southwest of Sydney.

== Location and features ==
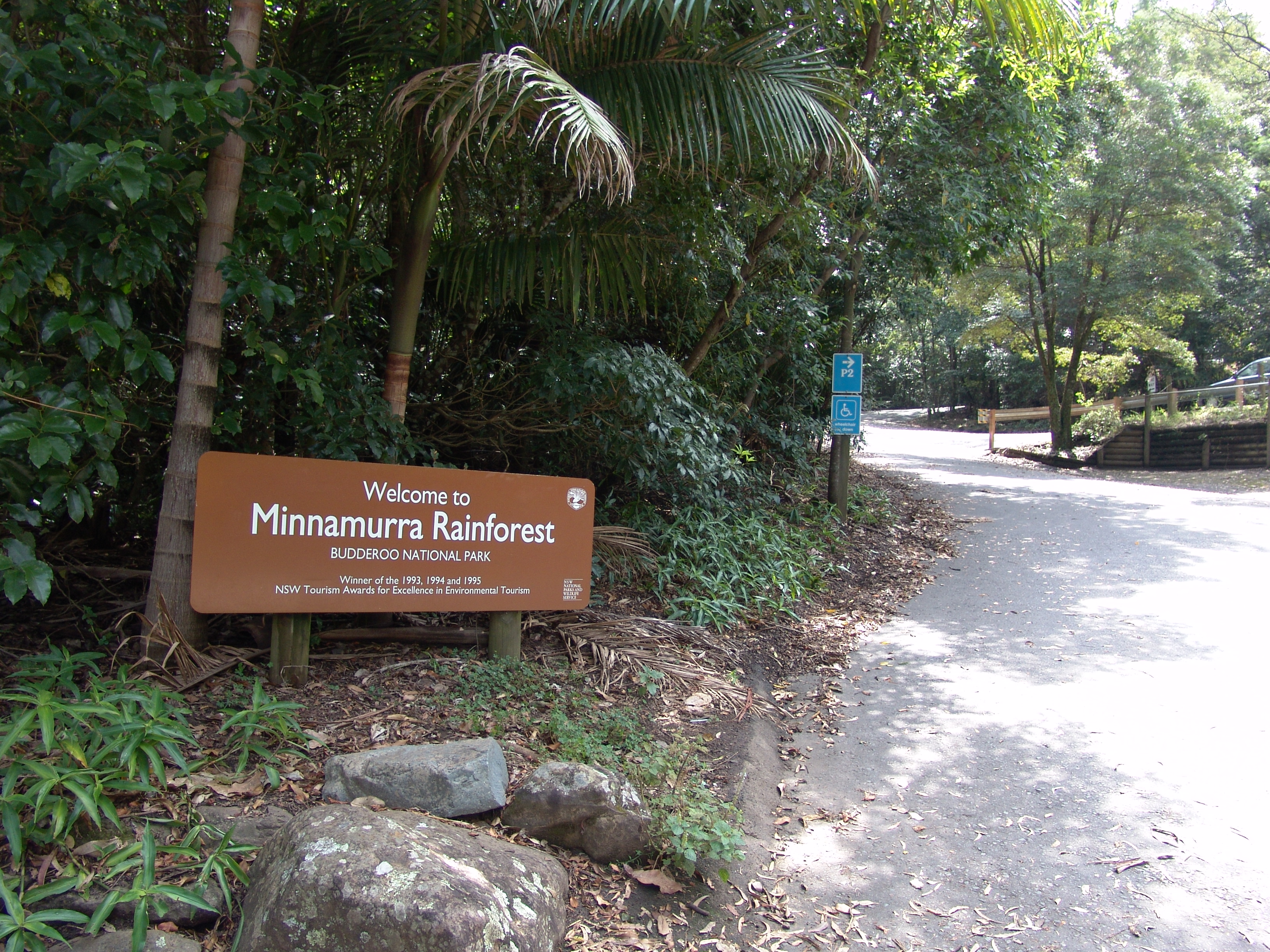
Minnamurra Rainforest entrance to the national park

The park is managed by the NSW National Parks and Wildlife Service. It is best known for its timber boardwalk through the Minnamurra rainforest. The park also features waterfalls, picnic and barbecue areas, and a visitors' centre.

Budderoo is part of the 7,334-hectare (18,120-acre) Budderoo and Barren Grounds Important Bird Area, which contains large numbers of endangered eastern bristlebirds, as well as smaller numbers of pilotbirds and rockwarblers, in a mosaic of sandstone heath and eucalypt woodland habitats.

Barren Grounds Nature Reserve is adjacent to the eastern border of the park; Yarrawa State Forest is not far from the park's western border.

== See also ==
- Protected areas of New South Wales
- Carrington Falls
- Belmore Falls
