= Fitzroy Falls, New South Wales =

Fitzroy Falls
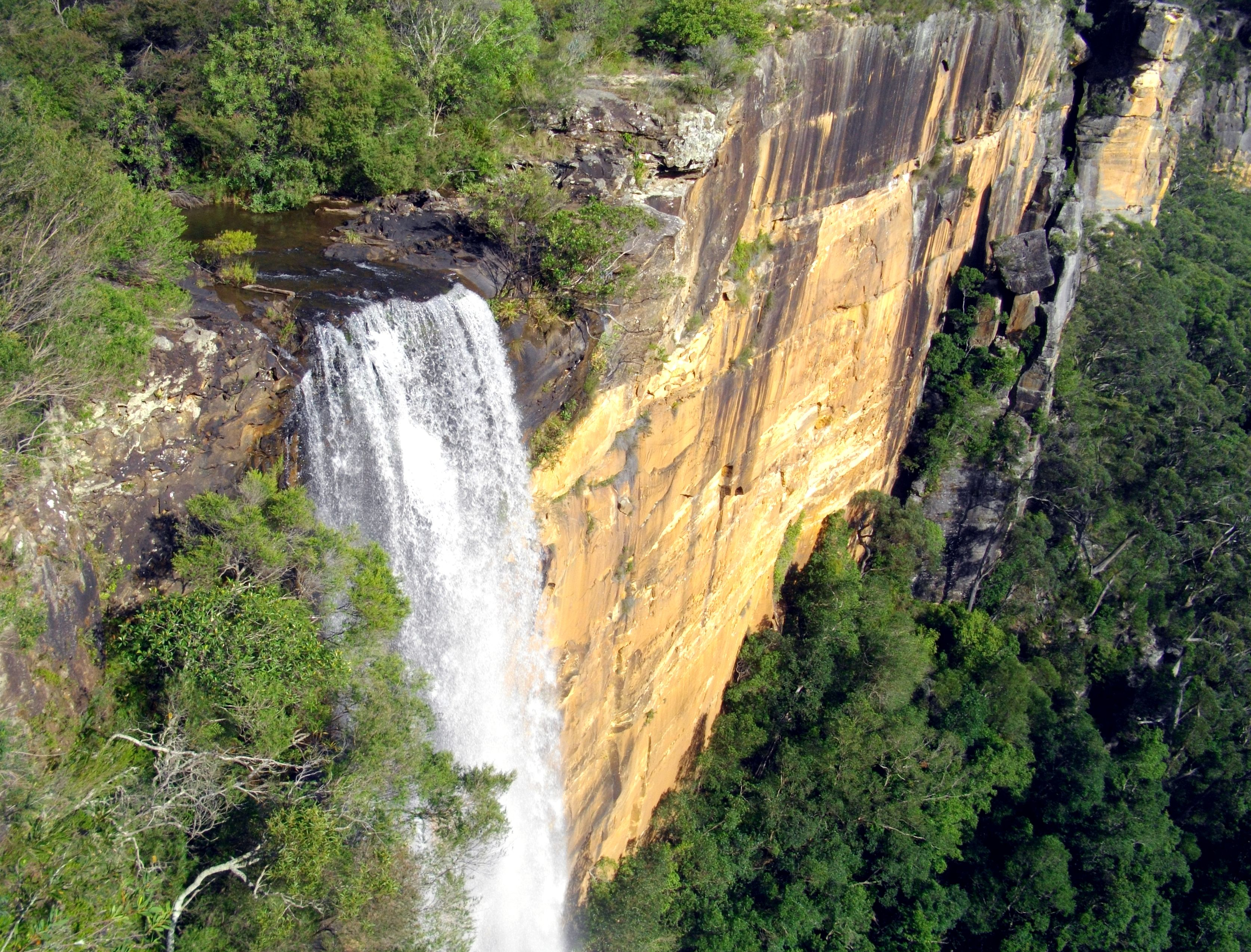
- Fitzroy Falls

- Coordinates: 34°37′S 150°29′E
- Country: Australia
- State: New South Wales
- Region: Southern Highlands
- LGA: Wingecarribee Shire
- Location: 137 km (85 mi) SSW of Sydney; 41 km (25 mi) W of Nowra; 16 km (9.9 mi) SSE of Moss Vale

Government
  - State electorate: Goulburn
  - Federal division: Whitlam
- Elevation: 660 m (2,170 ft)

Population
  - Total: 220 (SAL 2021)
- Postcode: 2577
- County: Camden
- Parish: Yarrunga
Localities around Fitzroy Falls
| Moss Vale | Yarrunga | Robertson |
| Morton National Park | Fitzroy Falls | Fitzroy Falls Reservoir |
| Morton National Park | Morton National Park | Barrengarry |

Fitzroy Falls (postcode: 2577) is a village in the Wingecarribee Shire, located within the Southern Highlands region of New South Wales, Australia. The locality was known as Yarrunga, but was renamed after the 81-metre (266 ft) waterfall.

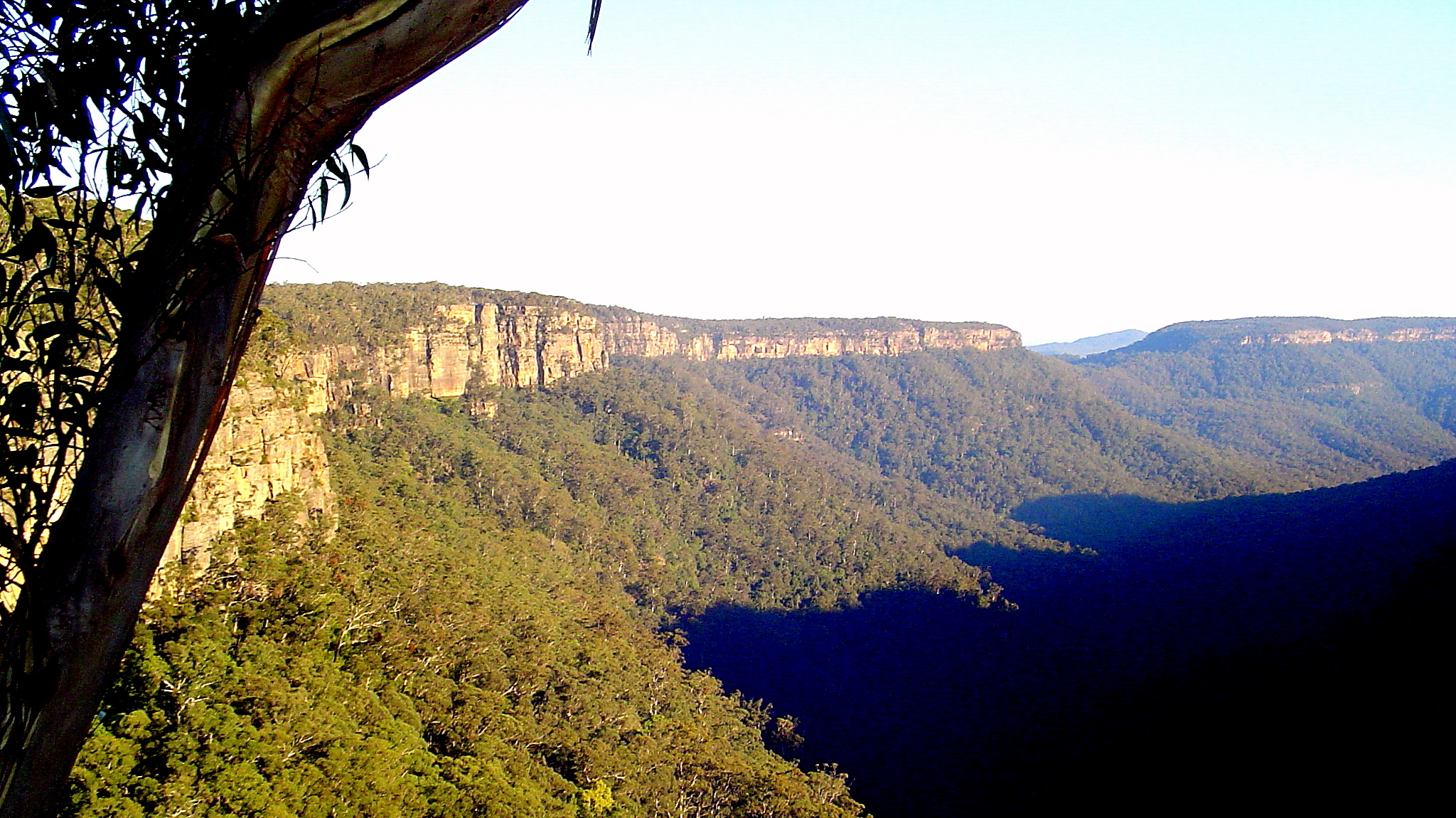
View from Fitzroy Falls NSW Australia

== Waterfall ==
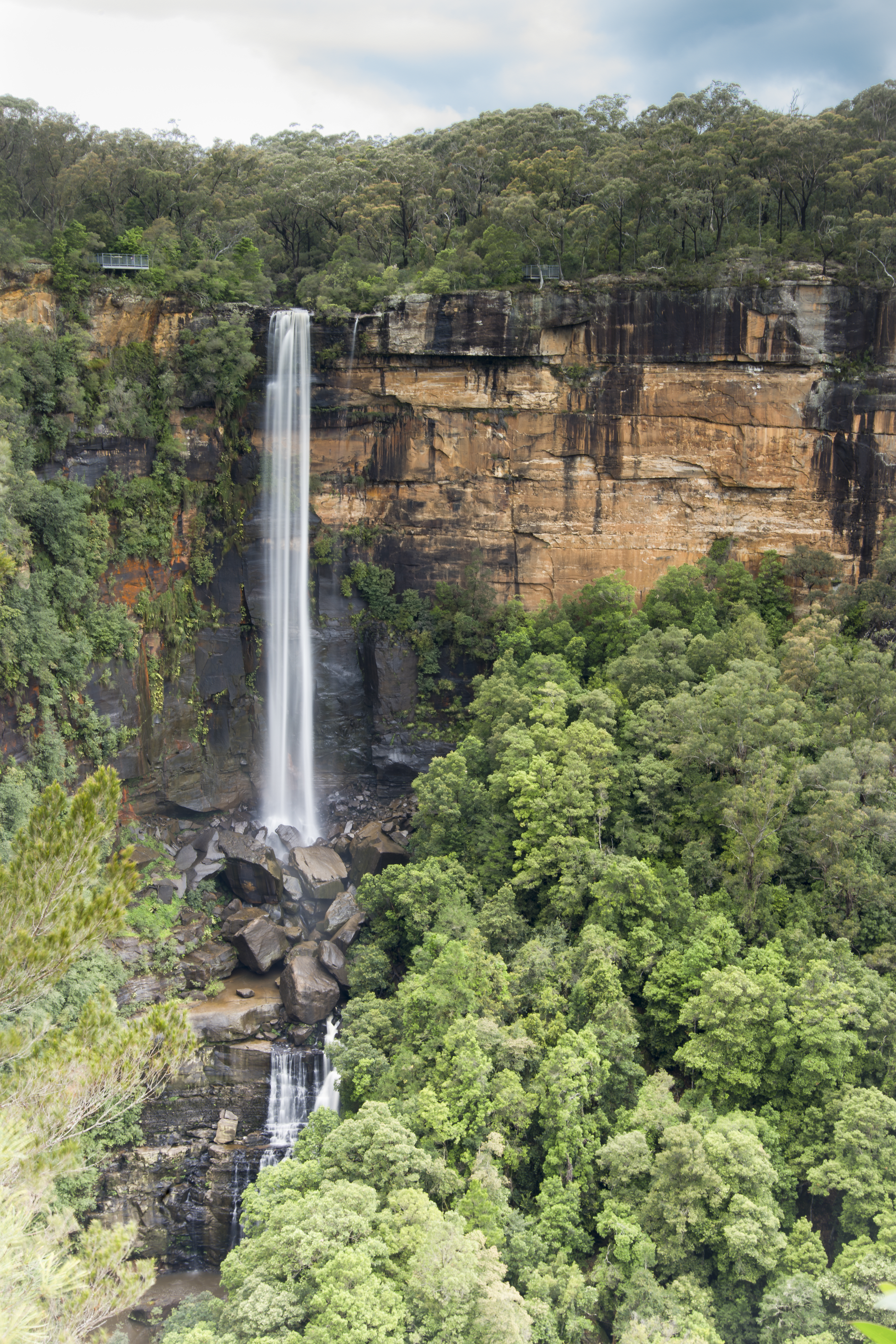
The waterfall

The waterfall was known to the indigenous Wodi Wodi people. The first European settler to see it was Charles Throsby, in the early 19th century. Near the head of the Yarrunga Creek in the Morton National Park, the waterfall was named in honour of Sir Charles Fitzroy, the Governor of New South Wales during his visit to the area in 1850.

While a town was planned for the area in the 1860s, little development occurred. With the advent of motor vehicles, Fitzroy Falls became, and still remains, a popular stopping point for tourists travelling towards the Southern Highlands. Substantial parking and catering facilities have been provided, together with pathways and boardwalks that enable able-bodied visitors to view the falls and other natural features.

== Population ==
At the 2016 census, Fitzroy Falls had a population of 216. According to the 2021 census, there were 220 people living at Fitzroy Falls.

== See also ==
- List of waterfalls
- List of waterfalls in Australia
- Fitzroy Falls Reservoir
