= Tallowa Dam =

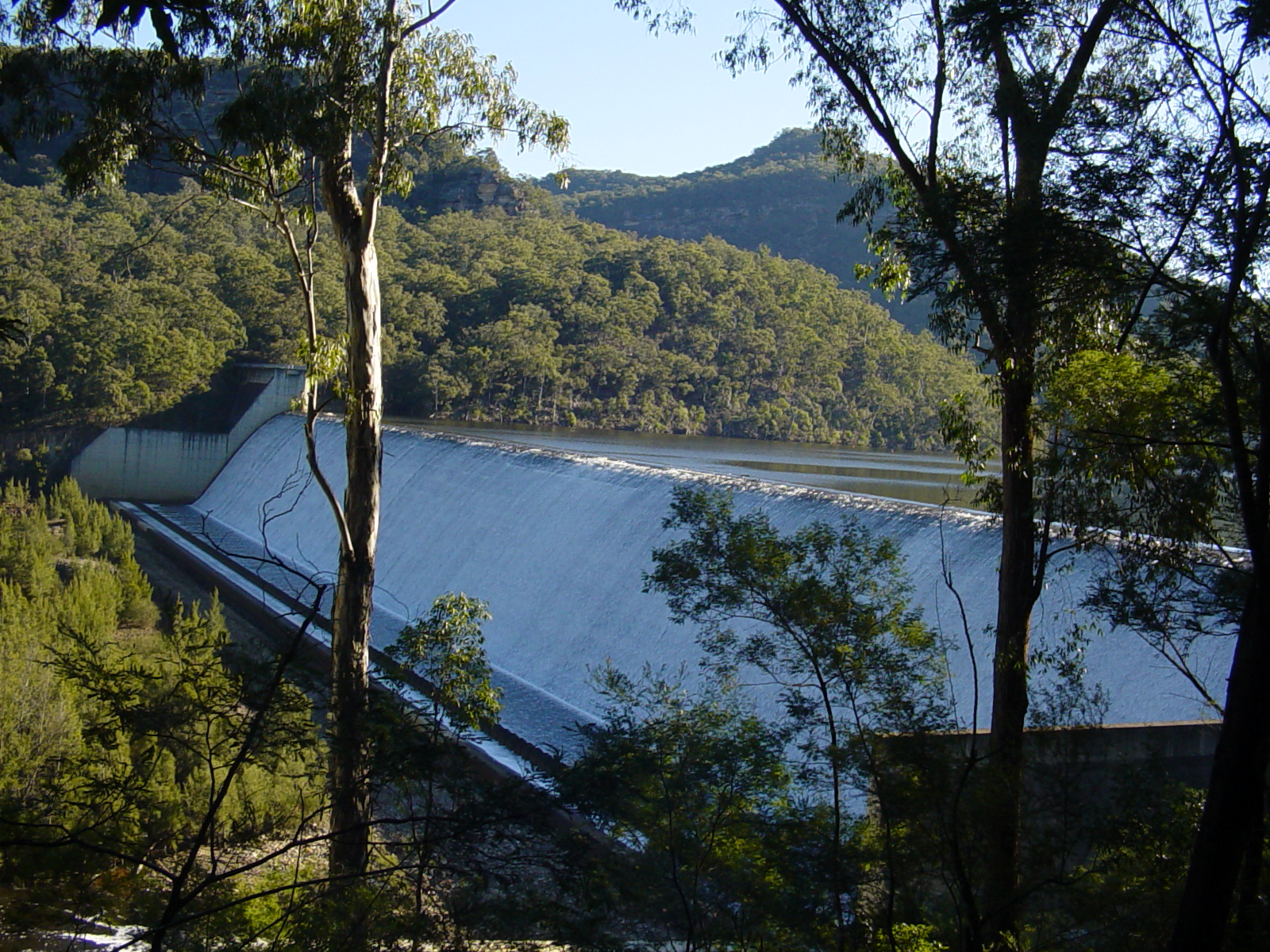
- The Tallowa Dam spillway in 2010
- Country: Australia
- Location: Shoalhaven
- Coordinates: 34°46′11″S 150°18′30″E
- Purpose: water supply
- Status: Operational
- Construction began: 1972
- Opening date: 1976
- Built by: Leighton Contractors
- Owner(s): Sydney Catchment Authority

Dam and spillways
- Type of dam: Gravity dam
- Impounds: Shoalhaven River
- Height: 43 m (141 ft)
- Length: 518 m (1,699 ft)
- Dam volume: 325 m^{3} (11,500 cu ft)
- Spillways: 1
- Spillway type: Central overflow
- Spillway capacity: 27,600 m^{3}/s (970,000 cu ft/s)

Reservoir
- Creates: Lake Yarrunga
- Total capacity: 90,000 ML (3,200×10^{6} cu ft)
- Catchment area: 5,750 km^{2} (2,220 sq mi)
- Surface area: 831 ha (2,050 acres)
- Website www.waternsw.com.au

Tallowa Dam is an Australian concrete gravity dam with central overflow spillway, located on the Shoalhaven River, downstream from the river's confluence with the Kangaroo River. The dam wall of 325 cubic metres (11,500 cu ft) is 43 metres (141 ft) high and 528 metres (1,732 ft) in length. At 100% capacity, the dam wall holds back approximately 85,500 megalitres (3,020×10^{6} cu ft) and creates the impounded reservoir of Lake Yarrunga that has a surface area of 831 hectares (2,050 acres), drawn from a catchment area of 5,750 square kilometres (2,220 sq mi). The spillway has a discharge capacity of 27,600 cubic metres per second (970,000 cu ft/s).

The full operating storage for Tallowa Dam refers only to the amount of water in the dam that is available to be transferred to Sydney and the Illawarra. When full, the dam can hold approximately 90,000 megalitres (3,200×10^{6} cu ft). 21,800 megalitres (770×10^{6} cu ft) is available to be transferred to the Sydney water supply. Other water from Tallowa Dam is provided to Shoalhaven City Council for supply to local communities. Water is also released from the dam as environmental flows for the Shoalhaven River.

The construction of a large barrier across the river has meant that the means of travel for fish has been completely confounded. There was no longer any means for the fish to get to their spawning areas further upstream. An innovative fish lift was constructed in 2009 to allow the fish to be collected and transferred over the dam wall.

Construction by Leighton Contractors began in 1972. It was completed in 1976.
