= 1998 Sydney water crisis =

Water contamination event in Sydney, Australia

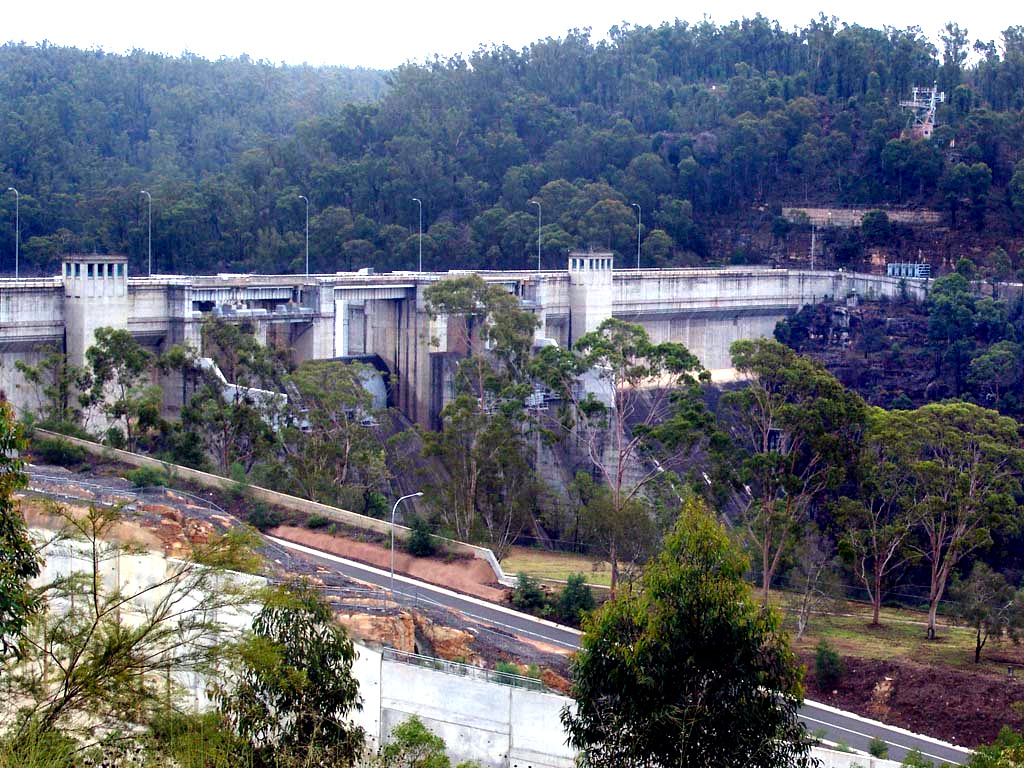
- Warragamba Dam wall
- Date: 21 July 1998 – 5 September 1998
- Location: Greater Metropolitan Sydney
- Participants: Sydney Water; NSW Health; David Hill (Sydney Water Chairman); Chris Pollett (Sydney Water MD); Craig Knowles (NSW Minister for Urban Affairs and Planning); Australian Water Services; National Health and Medical Research Council
- Outcome: Reorganisation of water supply and water management functions and agencies via: Establishment of the Sydney Catchment Authority with responsibility for catchments, dams, and bulk supply reservoirs; Sydney Water maintained management of water supply distribution, water treatment and sewerage, and stormwater management
- Inquiries: Sydney Water Inquiry (1998; under Peter McClellan QC)

The 1998 Sydney water crisis involved the suspected contamination of the water supply system of Greater Metropolitan Sydney by the microscopic pathogens Cryptosporidium and Giardia between July and September 1998.

Following routine water sampling and testing, over a series of weeks low level contaminants were found at Prospect, Potts Hill, Sydney Hospital, the Art Gallery of New South Wales, Macquarie Street, Centennial Park, Surry Hills, Rhodes, Enfield, Palm Beach and water treatment facilities at Warragamba, Nepean, North Richmond, Orchard Hills, Woronora, Macarthur, the Illawarra and Prospect. The reliability of these test results was subsequently called into doubt. Precautionary "boil water" alerts were raised covering several suburban areas for the period of the crisis.

In response to the crisis, the Government of New South Wales established a Commission of Inquiry, chaired by jurist Peter McClellan QC as Commissioner. McClennan handed down his final report to the NSW Premier making ninety-one recommendations that led to the reorganisation of water supply and water management functions and agencies in Greater Metropolitan Sydney via the establishment of the Sydney Catchment Authority with responsibility for catchments, dams, and bulk supply reservoirs; while Sydney Water maintained management of water supply distribution, water treatment and sewerage, and stormwater management. Both the Chairman and Managing Director of Sydney Water stood down during and following the crisis.

== Background ==
=== Sydney's water supply network ===
In 1998, Sydney Water supplied approximately 1,500 megalitres (53×10^{6} cu ft) of water each day to more than 3.8 million people in the Sydney, Blue Mountains, and Illawarra regions. A network of nine major dams plus several minor storage reservoirs was used to collect and store water, which in turn was delivered to a network of over 20,000 kilometres (12,000 mi) of water mains, 165 pumping stations, and 261 service reservoirs. The water supply was drawn from catchments on four main river systems the Upper Nepean, the Warragamba, the Shoalhaven and the Woronora with minor supplies drawn from the Hawkesbury River, and tributaries of the Grose, Fish and Duckmaloi rivers.

Since late 1996 all of Sydney's water supply has been filtered. Eleven water treatment plants are used to filter drinking water supplied to Sydney, Illawarra and the Blue Mountains. Seven of these facilities are owned and operated by Sydney Water. These are located at Orchard Hills, Cascade, North Richmond, Nepean, Warragamba, Linden and Greaves Creek. The remaining four privately owned and operated plants at Prospect, Macarthur, Illawarra and Woronora provide filtered water under contract to Sydney Water. These four plants provide more than 90% of Sydney's drinking water. Up to 80% is supplied through the Prospect plant alone. The water is distributed from Prospect to Pipe Head by tunnels and mains, with some areas supplied directly from these mains. From Pipe Head, water for the inner city, suburbs south of Sydney Harbour and inner western suburbs is carried by tunnel and mains to two large service reservoirs at Potts Hill and then by two tunnels (the Pressure Tunnel and City Tunnel) which terminate at Waterloo and Dowling Street pumping stations. Two pumping stations one at Prospect and one at West Ryde supply water for the northern suburbs and the northern beaches. The water for Ryde is supplied from Pipe Head.

== Timeline of event ==
Low levels of Cryptosporidium and Giardia were first detected in the water supply on 21 July. The levels were within acceptable health limits however Sydney Water did notify NSW Health. In days following, much higher levels were recorded, and on 27 July, the first "boil water" alert (in which residents were instructed to boil their tap water before use) was declared for the eastern Sydney central business district. On 29 July, a "boil water" alert was issued for the south of Sydney Harbour and on 30 July a Sydney-wide "boil water" alert was issued. The Sydney Water Corporation announced the water safe to drink again on 4 August.

Two other "boil water" alerts were issued in the following months due to ongoing contamination downstream of the Prospect Water Filtration Plant. The first began on 24 August and by early September it was being lifted until further positive results were reported and another alert from 5th-19th September was issued.

The contamination was caused by low-quality raw water entering the dam. This was attributed to moderate rainfall in July, followed by heavy rainfall in August and September (after decreasing storage levels since mid-July 1997) which caused pulses of the raw water to enter the dam.

The lack of cases of cryptosporidiosis, giardiasis, or any other health problem which might be attributed to tainted water led to suggestions the microbes were either not an infectious type, or not as prevalent as measured. An inquiry after the event revealed the publicity as an exaggeration of fact, with Australian Water Technologies, part of Sydney Water, severely overestimating the levels of parasites present in the water, with the recorded levels exposed as not harmful to human health. The handling of the crisis by Sydney Water, a state-government owned corporation since 1995, was heavily criticised, causing the resignation of both the chairman and the managing director. The incident also brought up issues of private vs. public ownership and scientific uncertainty.

== Outcomes ==
The Premier, Bob Carr, established the Sydney Water Inquiry and appointed Sydney jurist Peter McClellan QC as Commissioner. McClellan delivered a series of interim reports to the Premier, which were tabled in Parliament. The final report was delivered in December 1998 and detailed 91 recommendations for action by Sydney Water, NSW Health and other state and federal government agencies, including the National Health and Medical Research Commission.

The managing director of Sydney Water, Chris Pollett resigned in August 1998. The Chairman of Sydney Water, David Hill resigned ten days after the final crisis event, denied any responsibility, and claimed he was leaving only to concentrate on his political career.

The Sydney Catchment Authority was created in 1999 as result of the crisis, assuming control of Sydney's catchments and dams, while Sydney Water maintained responsibility for water treatment and distribution and for sewage collection, treatment and disposal.
