= Megarritys Bridge =

- Location within New South Wales Location within Australia
- 33°52′28″S 150°36′40″E
- Location: Warragamba Dam, Warragamba, Wollondilly Shire, New South Wales, Australia

Site notes
- Owner: Water NSW

New South Wales Heritage Register
- Official name: Megarritys Bridge
- Type: State heritage (built)
- Designated: 18 November 1999
- Reference no.: 1367
- Type: Water Supply Reservoir/ Dam
- Category: Utilities - Water
- Builders: Metropolitan Water, Sewerage and Drainage Board

Megarritys Bridge is a heritage-listed bridge across the Megarritys Creek, located at Warragamba Dam in the outer south-western Sydney suburb of Warragamba in the Wollondilly Shire local government area of New South Wales, Australia. It was built by Metropolitan Water, Sewerage and Drainage Board. The bridge is also known as Megarritys Bridge. The property is owned by Water NSW, an agency of the Government of New South Wales. It was added to the New South Wales State Heritage Register on 18 November 1999.

== History ==
Megarritys Creek Bridge is a concrete arch bridge spanning Megarritys Creek. The construction of the bridge provided a vital link across the Creek for the operation of the Warragamba Emergency Scheme. While it was designed eventually to carry the No 1 270-centimetre (106 in) outlet main from Warragamba Dam, for the Emergency Scheme it carried the 120-centimetre (48 in) main from the weir to Prospect Reservoir.

== Description ==
The construction incorporated an arch formwork design using tubular steel scaffolding. It is believed that this was the first instance in NSW of the use of this material for such load carrying purposes.

=== Modifications and dates ===
Substantially as designed, but with an increase in height of the crest of 5.1 metres (17 ft) with post tensioning anchors undertaken in 1989 as part of interim flood mitigation works.

== Heritage listing ==
As at 22 March 2001, Megarritys Bridge is considered to be of high significance as it serves the function of carrying the major Warragamba pipeline across Megarritys Creek. It is historically associated with the Warragamba Emergency Scheme, and at the time of construction, was one of the largest concrete arch bridges to be built in NSW. It is a unique item of engineering heritage as its design is based on an innovative "bow string" arch design rather than the more common "decked" arch design.

Megarritys Bridge was listed on the New South Wales State Heritage Register on 18 November 1999 having satisfied the following criteria.

The place possesses uncommon, rare or endangered aspects of the cultural or natural history of New South Wales.

This item is assessed as historically rare statewide. This item is assessed as scientifically rare statewide.

== See also ==
- Historic bridges of New South Wales
