= LWR (disambiguation) =

LWR is the light water reactor, a reactor used to generate nuclear power.

LWR may also refer to:

== Organisations ==
- Livestock water recycling, a Canadian environmental company
- Lincolnshire Wolds Railway, a heritage railway in Lincolnshire, England
- Lutheran World Relief, an international organization specializing in international development and disaster relief

== Other uses ==
- Locally weighted regression, in statistics
- London Weekend Radio, a former pirate radio station from London, England
- Long Way Round, a British television series documenting a motorcycle journey of Ewan McGregor and Charley Boorman
- Laser warning receiver, a military system used to detect laser emission of weapon guidance systems and laser rangefinders
- learning with rounding, a computational problem, a variant of learning with errors (LWE)

== See also ==
- Longwave (disambiguation), longwave radiation
