= Prospect Lake =

Prospect Lake may refer to:

- Prospect Lake (British Columbia), a small lake and neighbourhood in Saanich, British Columbia, Canada
- Prospect Lake (Colorado), a small lake and neighborhood in Colorado Springs, Colorado
- Prospect Reservoir, a dam-created lake in Prospect, Sydney, Australia
- Prospect Lake, a lake in Prospect Park, Brooklyn, New York
