= Infrastructure NSW =

Australian state government agency

Agency overview
- Formed: 1 July 2011
- Jurisdiction: New South Wales
- Minister responsible: Premier of New South Wales
- Agency executives: Graham Bradley, Chairman (2013–present); Tom Gellibrand, Chief Executive (February 2023–present)
- Parent department: New South Wales Treasury
- Key document: Infrastructure NSW Act 2011 (NSW) Act 23 of 2011
- Website: infrastructure.nsw.gov.au

Infrastructure NSW is an agency of the government of New South Wales that provides independent advice to assist the NSW Government in identifying and prioritising the delivery of critical public infrastructure across the Australian state of New South Wales for economic and social wellbeing.

It was established in 2011 by the then O'Farrell government and reports to the premier of New South Wales.

== History ==
The independent agency, established under the Infrastructure NSW Act 2011, was set up in July 2011 to plan and oversee a wide-ranging upgrade of the state's infrastructure. One of Infrastructure NSW's first major tasks was to deliver a 20-year State Infrastructure Strategy, which was delivered in September 2012. Other initial priorities for the body were the redevelopment of Sydney Convention & Exhibition Centre, planning of WestConnex and traffic management around Sydney Airport and Port Botany.

In May 2011, Barry O'Farrell appointed former Liberal premier Nick Greiner as chairman and in June, economist and former Sydney Water boss Paul Broad was appointed as the chief executive officer, on a reported salary of up to $500,000.

On 23 May 2013, both Greiner and Broad quit their respective roles at Infrastructure NSW over repeated disputes with the O'Farrell government. The former head of the Business Council of Australia Graham Bradley was appointed as the new chairman and former secretary of the Victorian Department of Transport Jim Betts became interim CEO, and was later appointed permanently.

On 25 November 2014, Infrastructure NSW published the State Infrastructure Strategy Update 2014, which made 30 investment recommendations on the next round of critical infrastructure for NSW. The NSW Government fully adopted the recommendations proposed by Infrastructure NSW for its State Infrastructure Strategy, which includes a $20 billion infrastructure program.

On 5 November 2015, minister for transport and infrastructure Andrew Constance announced Projects NSW – a specialist unit within Infrastructure NSW to manage the procurement and delivery of the state's infrastructure priorities.

In September 2025, the New South Wales state government set up a new agency named the Infrastructure Delivery Authority, it is modelled after the Housing Delivery Authority and the four-person panel will recommend projects for the treasurer, minister for planning and public spaces, and the minister for industry and trade to act upon. Funding was announced in the 2025–26 state budget to advance the creation of this agency. Projects valuing at least $1 billion and are non-residential are eligible for the program.

== Board members ==
The board of Infrastructure NSW contains a total of ten members, including the chief executive officer, chairman, four private sector members and four senior NSW public servants:

- Graham Bradley, chairman
- Tom Gellibrand, chief executive officer
- Marika Calfas, private sector member
- Peter Duncan, private sector member
- Peter Mac Smith, private sector member
- Elena Potenza, private sector member
- Abigail Goldberg, private sector member
- Michael Coutts-Trotter, secretary, NSW Treasury
- Kiersten Fishburn, secretary, NSW Department of Planning, Housing and Infrastructure
- Kate Boyd, secretary, NSW Cabinet Office

Past board members include Nick Greiner, Paul Broad, David Gonski, Chris Eccles, Sam Haddad, Mark Paterson, Carolyn Kay, Simon Draper, Dieter Adamsas, Arlene Tansey, Max Moore-Wilton, Blair Comley, Carolyn McNally and Rob Whitfield.
