= Thomas Haynes Upton =

Australian civil engineer

Thomas Haynes Upton OBE
- Born: 2 June 1889
- Died: 25 October 1956 (aged 67)
- Occupation: Civil Engineer
- Spouses: Jessie Toon Smith (m. 1921; died 1922) Irene Dodgshun (m. 1925)

Thomas Haynes Upton OBE (2 June 1889 – 25 October 1956) was an Australian civil engineer. Hailing from Melbourne, Awarded an exhibition, he entered Ormond College in 1906 and studied civil engineering at the University of Melbourne (B.Sc., 1910; M.Sc., 1912; B.C.E., 1912; M.C.E., 1919). Upton learned his trade in England as a consulting engineer designing bridges and buildings before returning to Australia to work for the Country Roads Board. He served as a sapper for the Royal Navy during World War I and was then commissioned as lieutenant in the Royal Engineers until being wounded and evacuated in February 1916. He returned to the front a year later before being wounded a second time and sent to the rear lines as a staff officer and acting captain. Three times mentioned in dispatches, he was discharged in 1919 and was appointed as an officer of the Order of the British Empire.

== Personal life ==
Returning to the Victorian Country Roads Board following a brief stay in the United States, Upton worked for ten years on the roadways of Victoria. He designed a bridge at Geelong that spanned the River Barwon. Marrying Jessie Toon Smith in 1921, he also began lecturing at local universities. He was widowed, however, in 1922, and married Irene Dodgshun in 1925 after moving to Sydney. He was heavily involved in modernising the road systems of New South Wales and working for the State Department of Transport. He moved to the Metropolitan Water, Sewerage & Drainage Board in 1935, and worked there until the outbreak of the Second World War whereupon he designed dockyards for the Royal Australian Navy. After the way he helped design the Warragamba Dam until his retirement in 1955.

Awarded honorary doctorates from both the University of Melbourne and University of Western Australia, Upton was also given several honorary titles in local church organisations for his services to them.

== Death ==
Upton died 25 October 1956 of a coronary occlusion.

Government offices
Preceded by Thomas Bryce Cooper	President of the Metropolitan Water Sewerage & Drainage Board; 1935 – 1955	Succeeded by John Goodsell
