= Livestock Water Recycling =

Canadian environmental company

Livestock Water Recycling, Inc. (LWR) is a privately owned Canadian company based in Calgary, Alberta. The environmental company focuses on livestock manure management of dairy, poultry, hog and digester CAFO livestock operations.

The company has built and manufactured industrial waste water treatment systems throughout North America since 1991. It conducts all design, production and manufacturing at its office in Calgary, Alberta. Initially, the company focused on wastewater remediation of oil and gas sites. In 2017 it began more focus on the agricultural industry.

== The LWR Manure Treatment System ==
The LWR Manure Treatment System uses mechanical and chemical processes to separate nutrients from manure in dairy or hog CAFO operations. The system produces dry solids, a liquid nutrient concentrate and clean potable water. Manure is rich in phosphorus, nitrogen, potassium, and ammonia. These nutrients can be used as fertilizer to improve crop production.

LWR currently has systems operating in Indiana, New York, Michigan, and Wisconsin.

== Awards ==
In 2011, LWR was recognized as a Top 10 Innovative Product in the 2011 Dairy Herd Innovation Awards at the World Dairy Expo in Madison, Wisconsin. Each entry was judged on its originality within the marketplace, usefulness and value to dairy farmers.

In 2010, LWR was recognized as a Top 10 New Products at the World Ag Expo in Tulare, California. The Top-10 new products are a favorite ‘must-see’ among World Ag Expo visitors.

In 2010, LWR was a recipient of the Emerald Award. The Emerald Awards celebrate the outstanding achievements by Albertans committed to protecting, preserving, enhancing and sustaining the environment.

In 2009, LWR won the Dr. F.X. Aherne Prize for Innovative Pork Production at the Banff Pork Seminar in Banff, Alberta. The award honors Canadian pork industry members who have developed original solutions to pork production challenges.

== See also ==
- Hydraloop Systems
- Himark BioGas
