= Paul Broad =

Australian economist

Paul Anthony Broad (born 8 April 1951) is an Australian economist known for his management of government business departments. In 2011 he was appointed as the Chief Executive Officer of Infrastructure NSW. He is an advocate of user-pays pricing, and has a philosophical commitment to involving the private sector.

== Early life ==
Moved from the Central Coast to the Newcastle area in 1964.

He attended high school at Hamilton Marist Brothers college.

He received Honours and master's degrees from Newcastle University in Economics. His honours thesis was on the perils of price control in the milk industry.

== Career ==
Broad began his career in the Federal Treasury in Canberra in 1974. In 1978 he returned to Newcastle to complete a Masters of Commerce (Economics).

1979 - Assistant director Industries Assistance Commission.

1993 - Hunter District Water Board as an economist.... move back to Newcastle.

1993 - Sydney Water

1997 - EnergyAustralia

2004 - Private business - Managing Director of PowerTel

2007 - Merger with AAPT and appointed as CEO of the merged organisation. Prior to the merger AAPT had been a leading member of the coalition of telcos trying to tender for the NBN Mark1, the proposed fibre to the node build. Broad opposed the proposition believing, incorrectly, that competive infrastructure could be built to fibre nodes.

Publicly he became a spokesman for industry opposition to the National Broadband Network, saying "We're having a massive income transfer from metro to the bush. Now that may be a good thing but don't hide it in the price.". In practice he was firmly siding wihth the Liberal Communications Shadow Malcolm Turnbull.

2011 - Appointed Chief Executive Officer of Infrastructure NSW ($500,000 salary - highest paid bureaucrat in NSW History).

As of 2011 Broad is a director of Kuth Energy.

2013 - Appointed Chief Executive of Snowy Hydro.

2017 - As CEO of Snowy Hydro Broad proposed the Snowy 2.0 pumped hydro scheme to then Prime Minister Malcolm Turnbull. Despite Turnbull's criticism of the NBN as having been developed with inadequate attention to due process, Broad told Senate Estimates that Snowy 2.0 was approved by Malcolm Turnbul in less thanb two weeks.

The initital feasibility study revealed a cost of $4.5 billion, more than double the original estimate. In 2023 the project's budget was reset to $12 billion - six times the original estimate.

2019-20 - As CEO of Snowy Hydro Broad receives over $2 million in salary and bonuses.

2022 - Resigned as CEO of Snowy Hydro.

2024 - Now working for McCloy Group.

== Personal life ==
Broad is married to Genevieve (his second wife) and they have two children. He is a keen surfer starting as a teenager and continuing into middle age.

== Political positions ==
Broad is an advocate of user-pays pricing, and champions the power of the market. This led to substantial pricing changes at Hunter Water and consequently demand dropped by 30 percent. When Chief Executive of Energy Australia, prices increased by 5.3% in 2004, which the opposition claimed would hit lower income families hard. He is also philosophically committed to involvement of the private sector, and in his role at the head of Infrastructure NSW has been reported supporting rail privatisation, congestion charges, and expanded tollways.

Government offices
Preceded by Robert Ernest Wilson	Managing Director of the Water Board; 1993 – 1994	Renamed Sydney Water
New title	Managing Director of Sydney Water Corporation; 1995 – 1997	Succeeded by Christopher Pollett
