= Sydney Catchment Authority =

Australian statutory authority

Statutory authority overview
- Formed: 1999
- Dissolved: 2015
- Superseding Statutory authority: WaterNSW
- Jurisdiction: New South Wales
- Minister responsible: Niall Blair, Minister for Primary Industries, Lands and Water
- Statutory authority executive: Fiona Smith, Chief Executive
- Parent Statutory authority: NSW Primary Industries
- Key document: Sydney Water Catchment Management Act, 1998 (NSW)
- Website: water.nsw.gov.au

The Sydney Catchment Authority was a statutory authority of the Government of New South Wales created in 1999 to manage and protect drinking water catchments and catchment infrastructure, and supplies bulk water to its customers, including Sydney Water and a number of local government authorities in the state of New South Wales, Australia.

The authority was led by its chief executive, who reported to the board of the authority that was ultimately responsible to the Minister for Primary Industries and Minister for Regional Water.

The authority was established pursuant to the Sydney Water Catchment Management Act, 1998 (NSW). From 1 January 2015, the Sydney Catchment Authority joined with State Water to form WaterNSW, a single organisation responsible for managing bulk water supply across the State.

== Objectives of the authority ==
The objectives of the authority are:

- to manage and protect the catchment area and catchment infrastructure to promote water quality
- to protect public health and safety, and the environment
- to ensure that the water it supplies is of appropriate quality
- to operate according to the principles of ecologically sustainable development
- to efficiently and economically manage catchment infrastructure works.

The SCA's customers then filter the water the SCA supplies and distribute it to households, businesses and other users. More than four and a half million people, about 60 percent of the NSW population, use water supplied by the SCA.

== See also ==
- Warragamba Dam
- Upper Nepean Scheme
- Shoalhaven Scheme
- Woronora Dam
- Blue Mountains Dams
- Prospect Reservoir
