= Hydraloop Systems =

Greywater recycling systems company

- Industry: grey water recycling
- Founded: 2015
- Headquarters: Netherlands

HydraLoop Systems is a company that produces decentralized greywater recycling systems. It was founded in 2015 in the Netherlands.

== History ==
The company was founded in November 2015 in Muiderberg, the Netherlands by Arthur Valkieser and Sabine Stuiver.

In November 2017, it introduced its first model. In 2020, the company was featured in the Netflix eco-documentary Brave Blue World. In June 2022, the company started working with Sydney Water for reducing water use in Sydney.

It got UN WIPO's Global Award in 2022 and several major awards at Consumer Electronic Show in Las Vegas in 2020.

== Reviews ==
In the USA, the Salt Lake City Tribune estimated, that Hydraloop Systems can recycle 90% of the greywater for an average household.

Financial Times, in its independent coverage estimated that Hydraloop can save 50% of water bills.

The Times, in its coverage, estimated that Hydraloop Systems reduces both mains water and sewage run-off by 45 percent.

Hydraloop systems treat greywater from shower, bath, and optionally washing machine as well as condensation water from tumble dryer, heat pump, and air conditioning.
