= Woronora Dam =

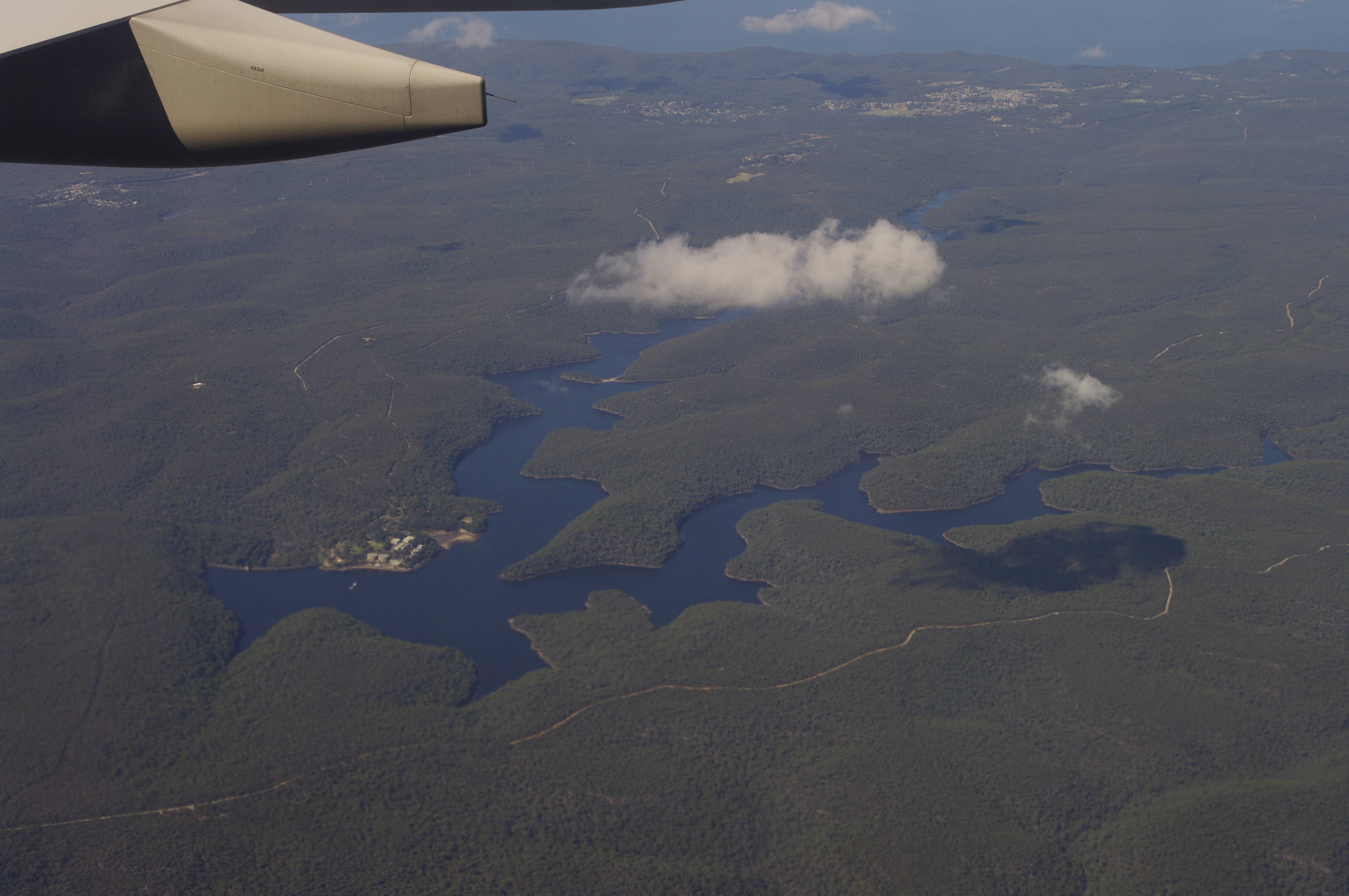
- Aerial view of Woronora Dam reservoir

- Location of the Woronora Dam of the southern boundary of greater Sydney
- Country: Australia
- Location: south of Sydney, New South Wales
- Coordinates: 34°6′40″S 150°56′4″E
- Status: Operational
- Construction began: 1927
- Opening date: 1941
- Construction cost: A$13 million
- Owner: Sydney Catchment Authority

Dam and spillways
- Type of dam: Gravity dam
- Impounds: Woronora River
- Height: 66 m (217 ft)
- Length: 390 m (1,280 ft)
- Dam volume: 285×10^{3} m^{3} (10.1×10^{6} cu ft)
- Spillway capacity: 1,470 m^{3}/s (52,000 cu ft/s)

Reservoir
- Creates: Woronora Dam
- Total capacity: 71,790 ML (2,535×10^{6} cu ft)
- Catchment area: 75 km^{2} (29 sq mi)
- Surface area: 380 ha (940 acres)

New South Wales Heritage Register
- Official name: Woronora Dam
- Type: State heritage (built)
- Designated: 18 November 1999
- Reference no.: 1378
- Type: Water Supply Reservoir/ Dam
- Category: Utilities – Water
- Builders: Metropolitan Water, Sewerage and Drainage Board of NSW

The Woronora Dam is a heritage-listed concrete gravity dam with an uncontrolled serpentine spillway across the Woronora River, located south of Greater Metropolitan Sydney, in the suburb of Woronora Dam, Sutherland Shire, New South Wales, Australia. The principal purpose of the dam is for potable water supply for Sydney's southern suburbs and the northern suburbs of the Illawarra region. The impounded 71,790-megalitre (2,535×10^{6} cu ft) reservoir is also called Woronora Dam and is sometimes incorrectly called Lake Woronora. The dam was designed by G. E. Haskins, Chief Engineer and the Metropolitan Water, Sewerage and Drainage Board of NSW (MWS&DB) and built from 1927 to 1941 by the MWS&DB. The property is owned by the Sydney Catchment Authority, an agency of the Government of New South Wales. It was added to the New South Wales State Heritage Register on 18 November 1999.

In 2009 the NSW State government granted the mining company Peabody conditional approval to mine for coal in the Reservoir catchment and directly under the Reservoir. In 2020 the NSW Planning Department gave final approval for the longwall mine tunnels directly under the Reservoir to go ahead.

== History ==
Water was first supplied to the Sutherland Shire in 1911 when a 150-millimetre (5.9 in) pipe was laid from Penshurst Reservoir across Georges River at Tom Ugly's Point to Miranda. In 1920 a scheme to supply water from the Woronora River to Sutherland and Cronulla was rejected. It was resurrected five years later when the then Metropolitan Water Sewerage and Drainage Board became the sole constructing authority for water supply works in the metropolitan area. The scheme involved the construction of a dam, which could be increased in size if necessary, on the Woronora River, about 24 kilometres (15 mi) upstream of its junction with the Georges River.

Construction of the dam began in 1927, the fifth dam built as part of Sydney's water supply. As forecast, the size of the dam wall had to be increased two years later. Workers' accommodation was spartan but functional with small bungalows built of fibrolite and placed on brick or concrete piers on the sloping ground. In 1930 The Depression intervened, suspending work on the dam. The men were forced to look for work further afield, even interstate, often leaving their families behind to live on the Woronora site. Some families had strong ties to the history of Sydney's dams, moving from the Nepean Dam project to Woronora, and then onto Warragamba. Other workers on Woronora Dam were former coal miners from nearby Helensburgh. Late in 1931 the Unemployment Relief Account released funds to build a weir to provide water to the Sutherland-Cronulla area and four years later, work resumed on the dam itself.

Woronora Dam was completed in 1941 at a cost of about A$13 million. The dam is the only one of Sydney's water supply dams which is not part of the Upper Nepean/Warragamba/Shoalhaven interconnected system. The dam was built with the objective of supplementing Sydney's water supply whilst the much larger Warragamba Dam was constructed. Six of the cottages were retained for on-site maintenance staff housing while the rest of Woronora township site was turned into picnic and recreational areas.

== Features and location ==
Woronora Dam is curved in appearance and is a mass gravity dam, remaining in position under its own weight. The dam wall has a height of 66 metres (217 ft) and a length of 390 metres (1,280 ft). Its lower levels are built of cyclopean masonry - massive sandstone blocks that were quarried on site. The 285-thousand-cubic-metre (10.1×10^{6} cu ft) main wall is made from blue metal and gravel concrete and there are two inspection galleries located inside. The dam has a separate, serpentine overflow spillway that discharges floodwater at the rate of 1,470 m^{3}/s (52,000 cu ft/s) through a concrete lined cutting into the river downstream of the dam. In 1988 Woronora Dam was upgraded at a cost of A$2.9 million by a system of wall and foundation drains to meet international dam safety standards.

The 75-square-kilometre (29 sq mi) catchment area together with the facilities at the dam are managed by the Sydney Catchment Authority. While there are no towns in the catchment area, parts of the Princes Highway, Heathcote Road and the Illawarra railway line pass through the area and the urban areas of Sutherland and Campbelltown are nearby.

Raw water from Woronora Dam is pumped to the adjacent Woronora Water Filtration Plant. This plant is one of nine in Sydney either operated by Sydney Water or privately owned and operated under contract to Sydney Water. The dam and water filtration plant supply water to the areas south of the Georges River including Sutherland, Helensburgh, Otford, Stanwell Tops, Lucas Heights and Bundeena.

The Maritime Operations Division within the Department of Defence use the Woronora Dam reservoir to test its sonar facilities. The testing station is on a pontoon in the middle of the reservoir.

The dam can be viewed by the public, and has a walking trail across the dam wall, and a picnic area including a carpark. Woronora Dam Road leads from the Princes Highway for seven kilometres to the dam.

== Popular culture ==
The building of the Woronora Dam became part of the backdrop of the comedy drama Dad Rudd MP. The film featured several construction scenes and employed many workers and their families as 'extras'.

== Heritage listing ==
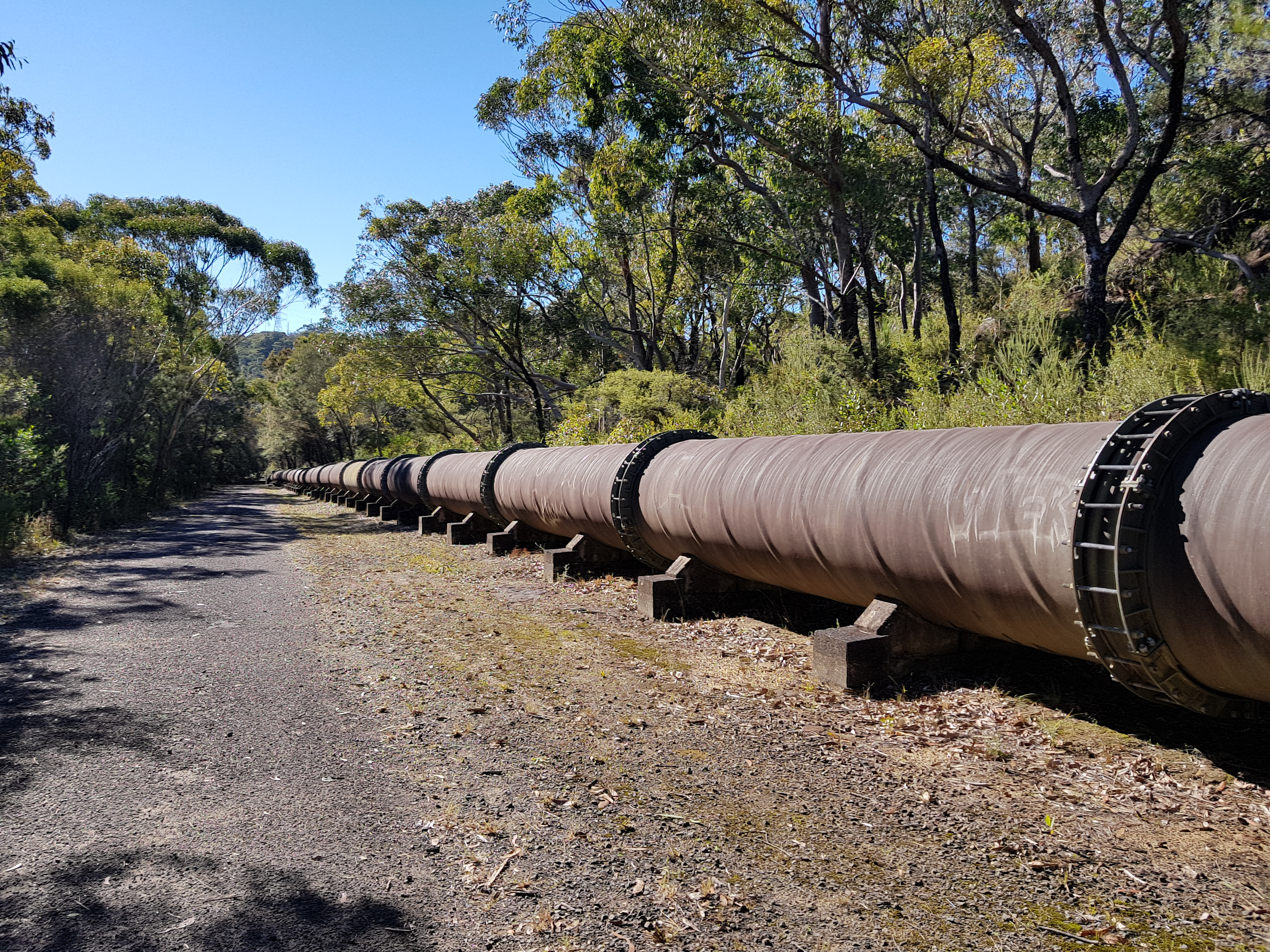
Woronora-Penshurst Pipeline

As at 10 September 2009, the Woronora Dam, constructed between 1927 and 1941, was the fifth and last of the water supply dams constructed prior to the Second World War to provide a secure water supply to satisfy the demands of industrial, commercial and residential development of metropolitan Sydney up to c. 1960. The Woronora Dam was specifically built to service metropolitan areas south of the Georges River.

The foundation and wall drainage systems, and the Stripped Classical architectural expression of the crest and valve houses, collectively continue to be integral elements of an Inter-war (c. 1930s) era high, curved, gravity dam in New South Wales.

The scale of the use of mass concrete in the upper portions of the dam wall is unique in New South Wales for the period. The design of the spillway incorporating the zig zag weir wall and diversion channels are likely to represent an early and notable technological advancement in the design of such structures.

The Woronora Dam is part of a group (in conjunction with the Metropolitan Dams) of like structures which are the State's largest and most intact ensemble of large dams completed prior to the Snowy Mountains Hydro-Electricity Scheme within a well defined geographical area.

The Dam contains in-situ items of Inter-war era water delivery technologies developed by the Water Board, such as lengths of iron discharge pipes, emergency roller gate, stopboards and penstocks which in consideration of their scale and integrity are rare examples of their types. The welded mild steel delivery pipeline (of which only a small section is included in the heritage curtilage) similarly represents a notable advance in construction technology for the period.

The site of the Woronora Dam contains remnants of the construction platforms, roadways blasted out of the hillside for plant and machinery, and the sites of the township specifically established for the construction of the Dam that collectively continue to evoke the era of the dam's construction, which in consideration of the scale and permanent nature of the works represent a notable achievement in civil engineering practice.

The dam is a regional landmark that has engendered beautification works undertaken from the 1950s for the general visiting public. The picnic areas in particular have strong associations with past management practices of the Water Board. The grounds of the dam are associated with the local and regional community of Sydney as a longstanding place of passive recreation.

Woronora Dam was listed on the New South Wales State Heritage Register on 18 November 1999 having satisfied the following criteria.

The place is important in demonstrating the course, or pattern, of cultural or natural history in New South Wales.

In providing water for southern suburbs of metropolitan Sydney the Woronora Dam, in ensuring security of supply, contributed to the extensive residential and commercial development of Sutherland from the 1930s.

Woronora Dam was constructed over a period of ten years between 1927 and 1941, a protracted construction period which is directly related to the Great Depression and a period of government financial stringency. The completion of the Dam during this period was one of the major public works projects undertaken in the State.

The place has a strong or special association with a person, or group of persons, of importance of cultural or natural history of New South Wales's history.

The design and construction of Woronora Dam was undertaken by the Construction Branch of the Water Board. The construction of the Dam drew upon the knowledge and experience of a number of the engineers including Gerald Haskins (the first engineer-in-chief of the former Water Board), Stanley T. Farnsworth and (Sir) William Hudson (best known for his role in the Snowy Mountains Hydro Electricity Scheme).

The place is important in demonstrating aesthetic characteristics and/or a high degree of creative or technical achievement in New South Wales.

The wall of Woronora Dam is an engineering work imbued with a sense of high aesthetic value expressed through the long curved high wall set with the wide valley of the Woronora River. Upstream of the dam wall this setting is characterised by the broad expanse of the pool of water bordered by the crests of the valley sides. Downstream of the dam wall the setting is characterised by forested hillsides. Collectively this topography at times of high water level imparts a picturesque scene when viewed from select vantage points above and on the dam wall.

The design and finishes of the crest house and lower valve house in the Inter War Stripped Classical style were prepared by the engineers of the Water Board. The architectural detailing evokes a sense of monumentalism that is ideally suited to the context of a dam, and is not exhibited elsewhere on this scale.

The place has a strong or special association with a particular community or cultural group in New South Wales for social, cultural or spiritual reasons.

The dam wall and spillway is recognised by the National Trust of Australia (NSW) as being a place which is part of the cultural environment of Australia, which has aesthetic, historical, architectural, archaeological, scientific, social significance for future generations, as well as for the present community of New South Wales.

The Woronora Dam is recognised by the Heritage Council of N.S.W. as a place which is of significance to New South Wales in relation to its historical, scientific, cultural, social, archaeological, natural and aesthetic values.

The grounds of the Dam are likely to be associated by members of the community with the construction township, in particular for the period of the Great Depression when considerable numbers of families who resided at the place during those turbulent years.

The place has potential to yield information that will contribute to an understanding of the cultural or natural history of New South Wales.

The dam wall is an excellent late example of gravity dam construction in the Inter-war era in incorporating inspection galleries, contraction joints, and ground surface drainage system which demonstrate the principal characteristics of this technology at the time.

The use of mass concrete in the upper section of the wall is likely to represent a major innovation in terms of dam construction technology at the time.

The terraces and platforms adjoining the dam wall abutments demarcate the location of plant and equipment used in the construction of the Dam, in particular the location of the cableway head towers, and concrete mixing plant, which may potentially provide further insight into Inter-war era construction practices.

The hillside near the upper picnic area and area alongside the road of access were the sites of the original construction township. These areas retain a road formation, drainage lines, concrete platforms and dry packed walls from that era. The integrity is such that collectively these features may potentially provide further insight into the lifestyles of the employees that constructed the Dam.

The catchment area in being relatively untouched bushland in close proximity to a major urban area has a high potential for further research into natural ecosystems.

The place possesses uncommon, rare or endangered aspects of the cultural or natural history of New South Wales.

The construction technique of mass concrete in the upper sections of the dam wall is a first in New South Wales in dam construction on this scale. It was a technique that came to be exemplified in the construction of the Captain Cook Graving Dock and Warragamba Dam.

The size of the dam is unusual given the primary reason behind its construction was the supply of the suburban areas south of the Georges River. Other comparable sized dams are located in the adjoining Metropolitan Catchment which service the greater metropolitan area of Sydney.

The design of the spillway weir with its zig zag wall and diversion channels is likely to be unique in New South Wales for the time of construction.

The use of a welded mild steel pipeline (the majority of the length of the pipeline is outside the scope of this report) to delivery the water to Penshurst is a first in New South Wales.

The Dam is one of two extant dams in New South Wales that incorporate extensive Inter War Stripped Classical architectural detailing in the crest wall and superstructures of the valve and crest house.

The crest and valve houses and inlet works retain original ironwork which represent a substantial repository of water supply delivery technology for the era.

The place is important in demonstrating the principal characteristics of a class of cultural or natural places/environments in New South Wales.

Woronora Dam is representative of a type of gravity dam constructed in New South Wales by the Water Supply and Sewerage Branch of the NSW Public Works Department and Water Board during the first half of the twentieth century. Key representative attributes of the Dam's design and construction include the use of cyclopean masonry bedded in sandstone concrete in the lower section of wall, use of blue metal concrete in the wall facings, use of a spillway set way from the gravity wall, valve and crest houses attractively designed and finished to a high standard, the use of an array of upstream intakes to regulate the quality of water supply, the internal inspection gallery, the foundation drainage system, the contraction joints, and the drainage system.

The upgrading of the valves and ancillary monitoring and operating equipment is representative of modern-day safe operating practice.

The construction technologies used at Woronora Dam are representative of dams constructed in New South Wales through the first half of the twentieth century. Key representative attributes include the use of cableways, the building of temporary camps to house labourers and tradesmen, building of semi-permanent cottages to house salaried staff, the construction of terraced platforms to for plant and machinery, mechanisation of concrete production, the construction of a purpose built road of access to transport men, supplies and materials from the nearest railhead to the construction site, the building of permanent infrastructure such as water supply for construction plant, men and horses, and the use of electricity to power plant and equipment.

The rehabilitation of tracts of land scarred in the construction processes employed at Woronora Dam through beautification works is representative of practices undertaken at other dams throughout New South Wales. Key representative attributes of this practice include utilising the former terraced construction platforms as picnic areas and lookouts, and utilising the former construction roads and tramway for vehicular access to the dam site and dam wall.

The practice of ongoing maintenance of the dam wall and pipeline after completion through surveillance provided by resident staff is representative of procedures undertaken at other dams and weirs constructed in New South Wales.

The provision of public amenity at the Dam is representative of the use of large water supply and irrigation dams in New South Wales as places for recreation by the greater community.

== Gallery ==
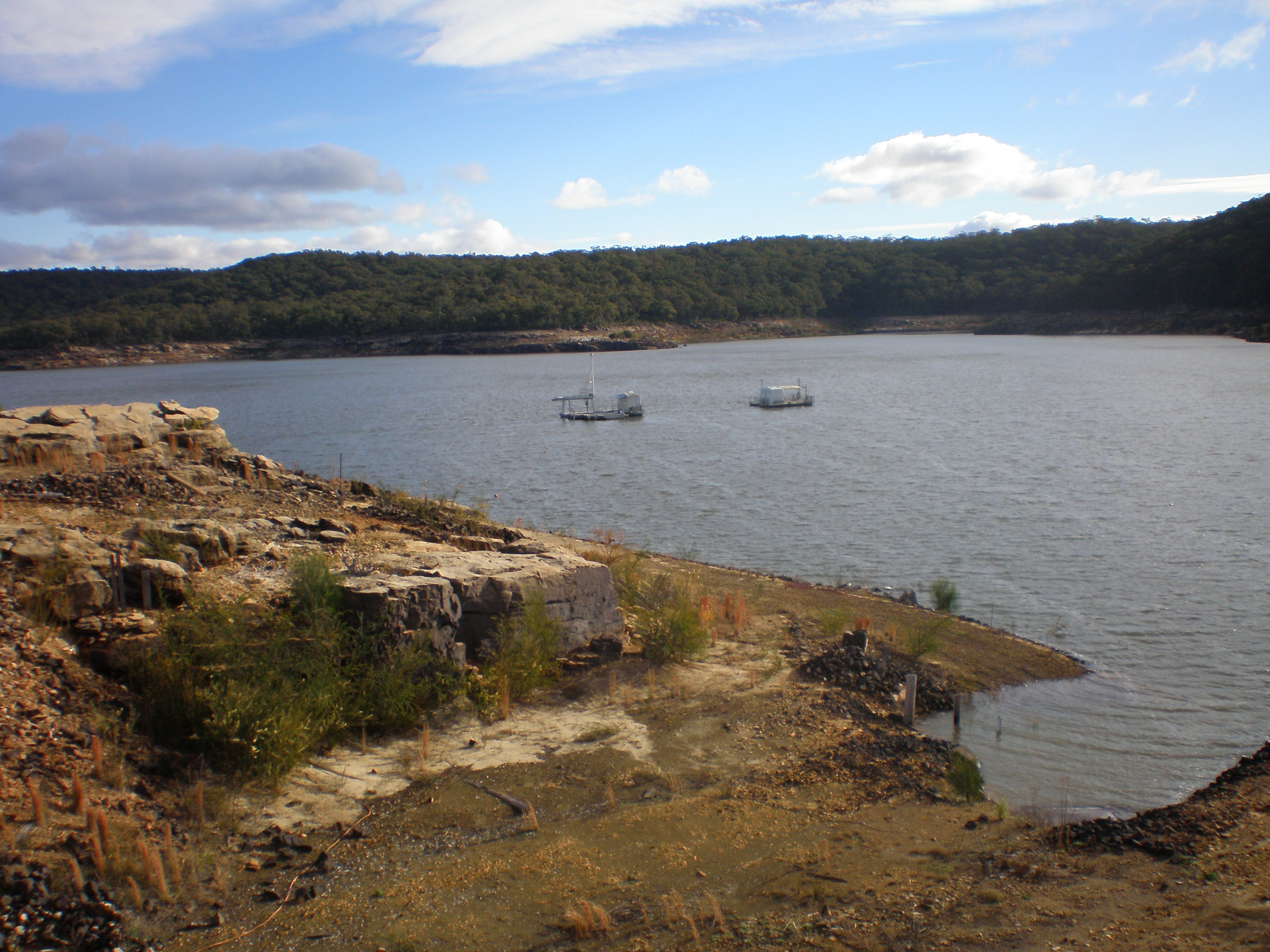
Woronora Dam reservoir and surrounding catchment area

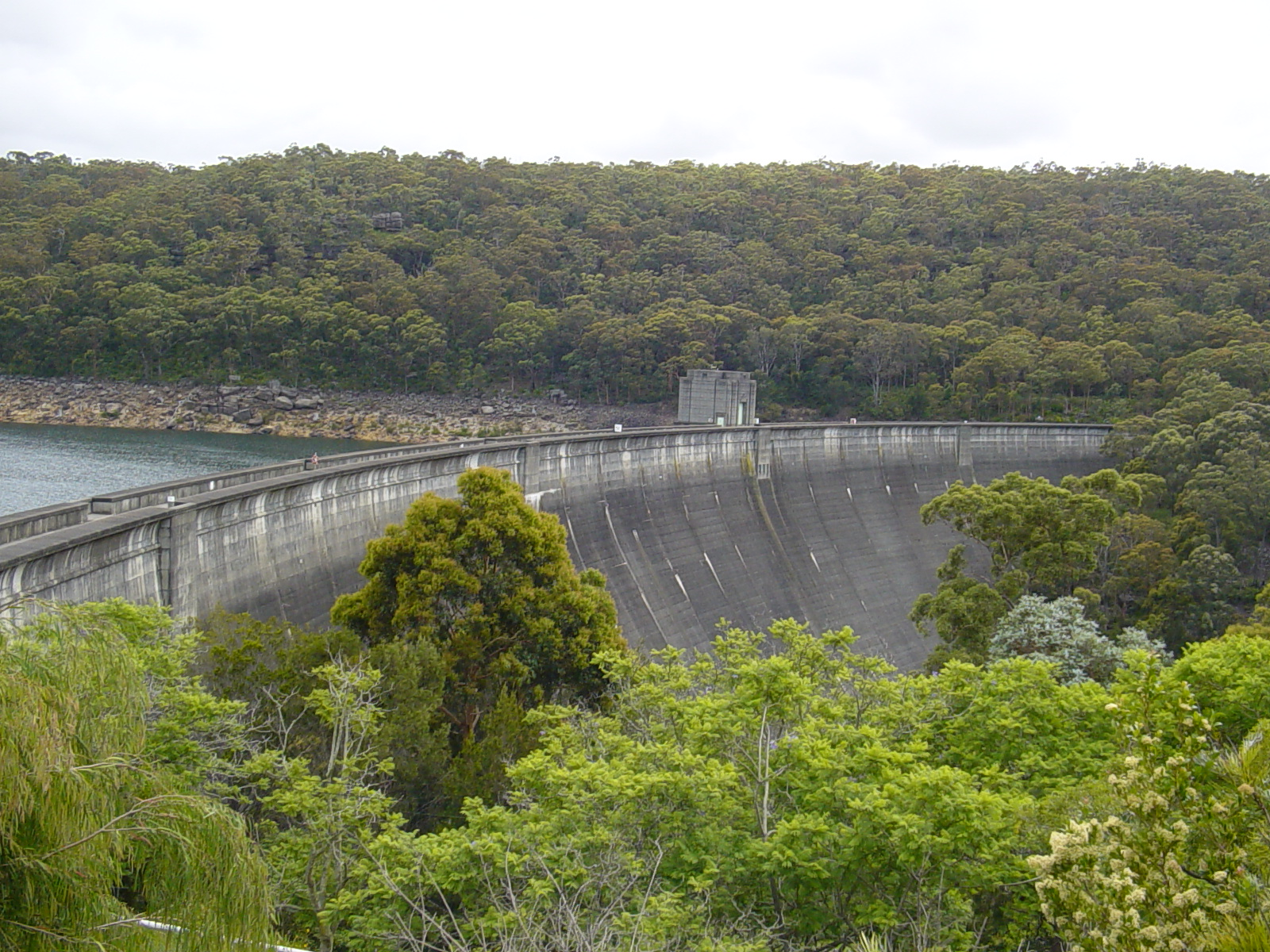
Woronora Dam at 54% capacity

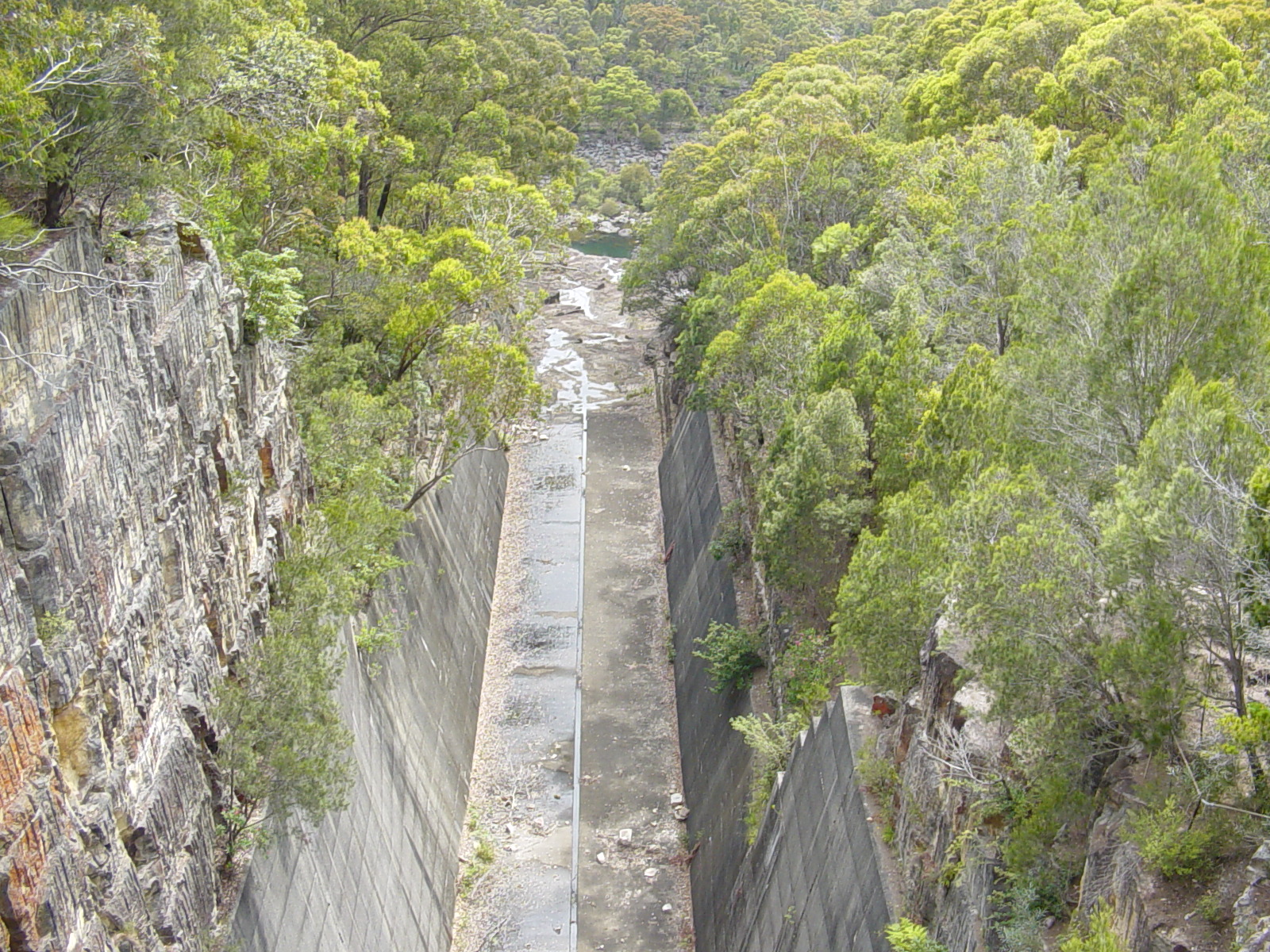
Woronora Dam Spillway

== See also ==
- List of dams and reservoirs in New South Wales
- Geography of Sydney
