= Prospect Reservoir =

Prospect Dam
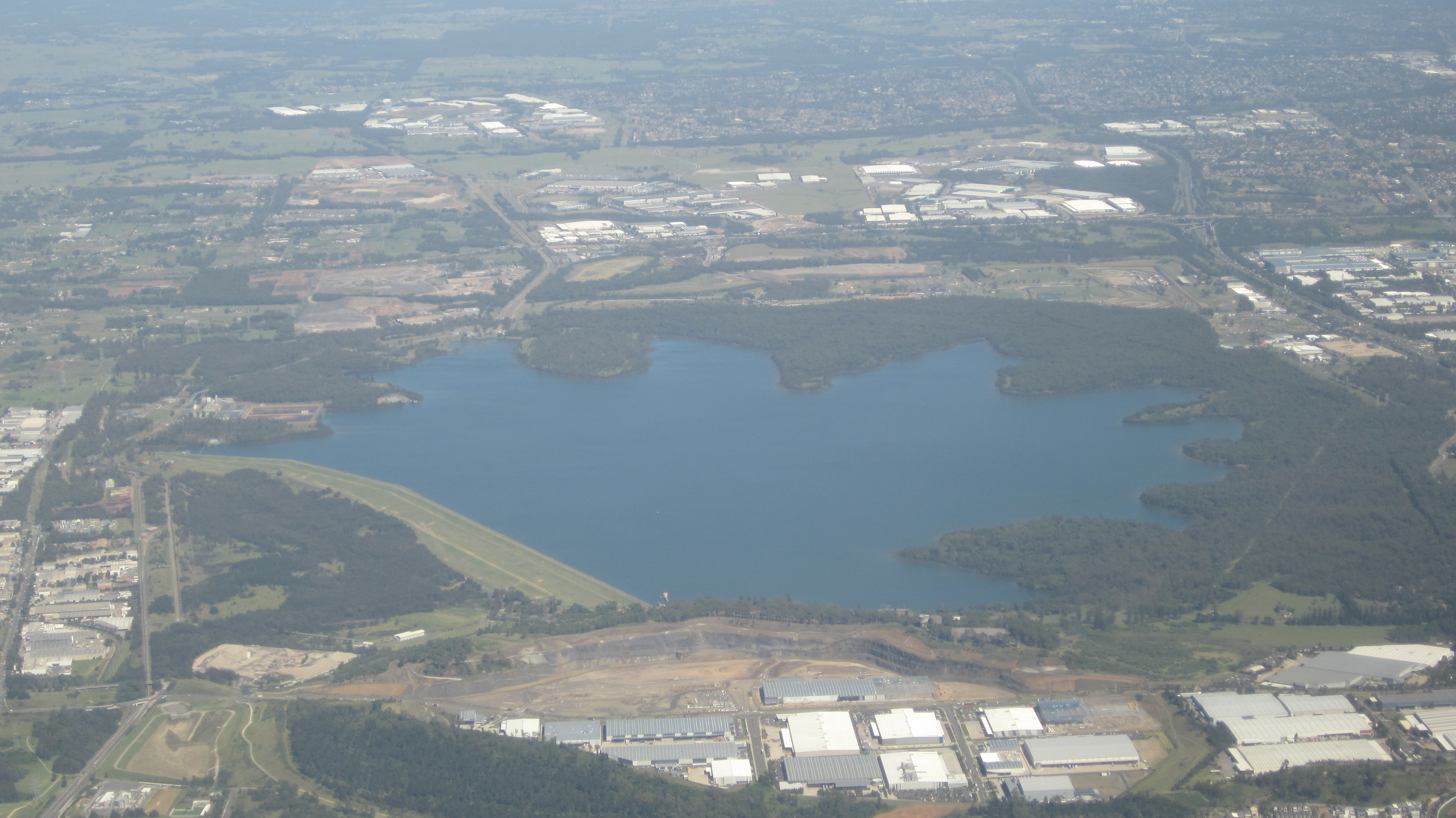
- Aerial view of Prospect Reservoir looking west

- Location of Prospect Reservoir in New South Wales
- Country: Australia
- Location: Western Sydney, New South Wales
- Coordinates: 33°49′41″S 150°53′56″E
- Purpose: Potable water supply
- Status: Operational
- Opening date: 1888
- Owner: Sydney Catchment Authority
- Operator: Sydney Water

Dam and spillways
- Type of dam: Embankment dam
- Impounds: Prospect Creek
- Height: 26 m (85 ft)
- Length: 2,225 m (7,300 ft)
- Dam volume: 2,892×10^{3} m^{3} (102.1×10^{6} cu ft)
- Spillways: 1
- Spillway type: Uncontrolled
- Spillway capacity: 230 m^{3}/s (8,100 cu ft/s)

Reservoir
- Creates: Prospect Reservoir
- Total capacity: 50,200 ML (1,770×10^{6} cu ft)
- Catchment area: 9.7 km^{2} (4 sq mi)
- Surface area: 5.25 km^{2} (2 sq mi)
- Maximum water depth: 24 m (79 ft)

The Prospect Reservoir is a heritage-listed 50,200-megalitre (1,770×10^{6} cu ft) potable water supply and storage reservoir created by the Prospect Dam, across the Prospect Creek in the Western Sydney suburb of Prospect, in New South Wales, Australia. The eastern bounds of the reservoir are a recreational area and the western periphery are within the bounds of Western Sydney Parklands. It was added to the New South Wales State Heritage Register on 18 November 1999.

Prospect Reservoir is Sydney's largest reservoir and stores water conveyed from Warragamba Dam, the Upper Nepean Dams (Cataract, Cordeaux, Avon and Nepean) and if necessary, from the Shoalhaven Scheme, for supplying the larger component of the water distribution system of the Sydney metropolis. Located approximately 34 km west of Sydney, the reservoir is a zoned earth embankment dam that is 26m high and approximately 2.2 km long, with a storage capacity of 50,200 megalitres and an open capacity of 8,870 megalitres.

== History ==
Shortly after 1808, William Lawson was appointed aide-de-camp to George Johnston and was granted 500 acres (2.0 km^{2}) at Prospect. He built a large house there in the 1820s, which he named Veteran Hall. He died on the property on 16 June 1850 and the property was eventually acquired by the Metropolitan Water Board. The house was demolished in 1929 and most of the low lying surrounding property is submerged.

In 1867, the Governor of NSW appointed a Commission to recommend a scheme for Sydney's water supply, and by 1869 it was recommended that construction commence on the Upper Nepean Scheme. This consisted of two diversion weirs, located at Pheasant's Nest and Broughton's Pass, in the Upper Nepean River catchment, with water feeding into a series of tunnels, canals and aqueducts known as the Upper Canal. It was intended that water be fed by gravity from the catchment into a reservoir at Prospect. This scheme was to be Sydney's fourth water supply system, following the Tank Stream, Busby's Bore and the Botany (Lachlan) Swamps.

Prospect Reservoir was the first earthfill embankment dam in Australia and was completed in 1888. At the time it was intended to deliver water from the Upper Nepean Scheme via the Upper Canal to the reservoir. The quintessential feature of the scheme was the diversion of the Nepean River below its junction with the Avon and Cordeaux Rivers. The Pheasant's Nest weir, near the township of Wilton, diverts the water through a 7 km long tunnel to the Cataract River at Broughton's Pass, near the township of Appin, where a similar weir diverts the flow of the four rivers through a 58 km system of tunnels, aqueducts and open channels to Prospect Creek upon which the earthen dam wall is located. When it was completed in 1888, Prospect reservoir provided the storage component of the scheme, as the weirs did not have the capacity to store water. Prior to the completion of the Lower Canal, the water shortage still needed to be dealt with. Hudson Brothers of Clyde built a temporary raised pipe structure to deliver water from Prospect direct to the Botany Swamps.

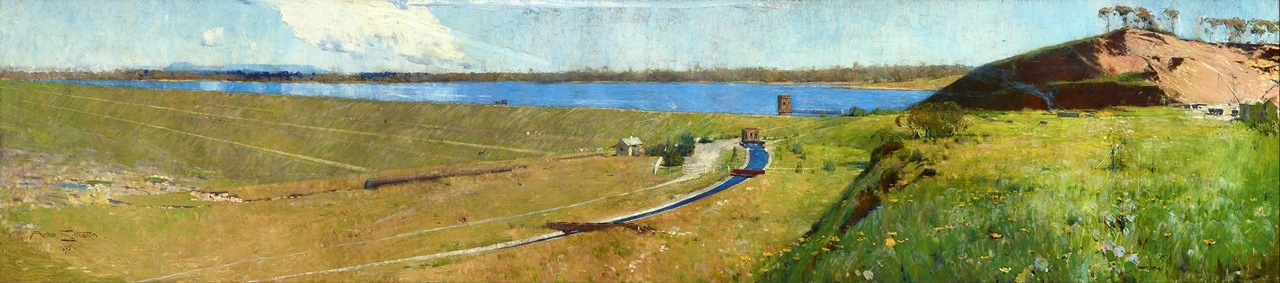
Prospect Reservoir (1895) by Arthur Streeton

In 1895 a painting of the Prospect Reservoir was created by Arthur Streeton which was owned by the Metropolitan Water and Sewerage Board before being donated to the Art Gallery of New South Wales in 1937.

Between 1893 and 1916, extensive remedial works were carried out in order to correct slumps in the upstream face.

With completion of Warragamba Dam in 1960, Prospect Reservoir continued to play an important role in storing Sydney's water. A second pipeline linking Warragamba and Prospect was completed in 1966, significantly increasing the volume of water that could be transferred during peak demand periods. In 1979–80, a major strengthening programme on the reservoir wall was completed by increasing the volume of its downstream side. The upstream face was strengthened in 1997.

With the commissioning of the Prospect Water Filtration Plant in 1996, raw water transferred from Warragamba and the Upper Nepean Dams was sent directly to the treatment facility, by-passing the Reservoir. However, the filtration plant can draw water directly from the Reservoir if needed. This is one of the largest such facilities in the world and it has changed the role of the Reservoir to that of a service reservoir and large off-line settling basin for the Warragamba and Upper Canal systems in the event of a water quality problem, covering daily fluctuations of demand in the distribution system. Since its construction, parts of the area surrounding the reservoir have formerly been used for passive community recreation, and consequently the Water Board provided numerous parks and picnic facilities, primarily on its eastern side.

From 2006 a new raw water pumping station and associated infrastructure were built on the reservoir's south-eastern side, including pipeline, power supply and access road.

It was formerly the major distribution reservoir for Sydney's main water supply system until the commissioning of the Prospect Water Filtration Plant in 1996. The reservoir's role has since been changed to that of an off-line storage service reservoir, which covers daily fluctuations of demand in the distribution system. The reservoir can now be drawn on when needed to supplement the Warragamba Pipeline and Upper Canal inflows into the Filtration Plant. It remains an essential component of Sydney's water supply system and therefore is critical Government infrastructure.

=== Scour/outlet system ===
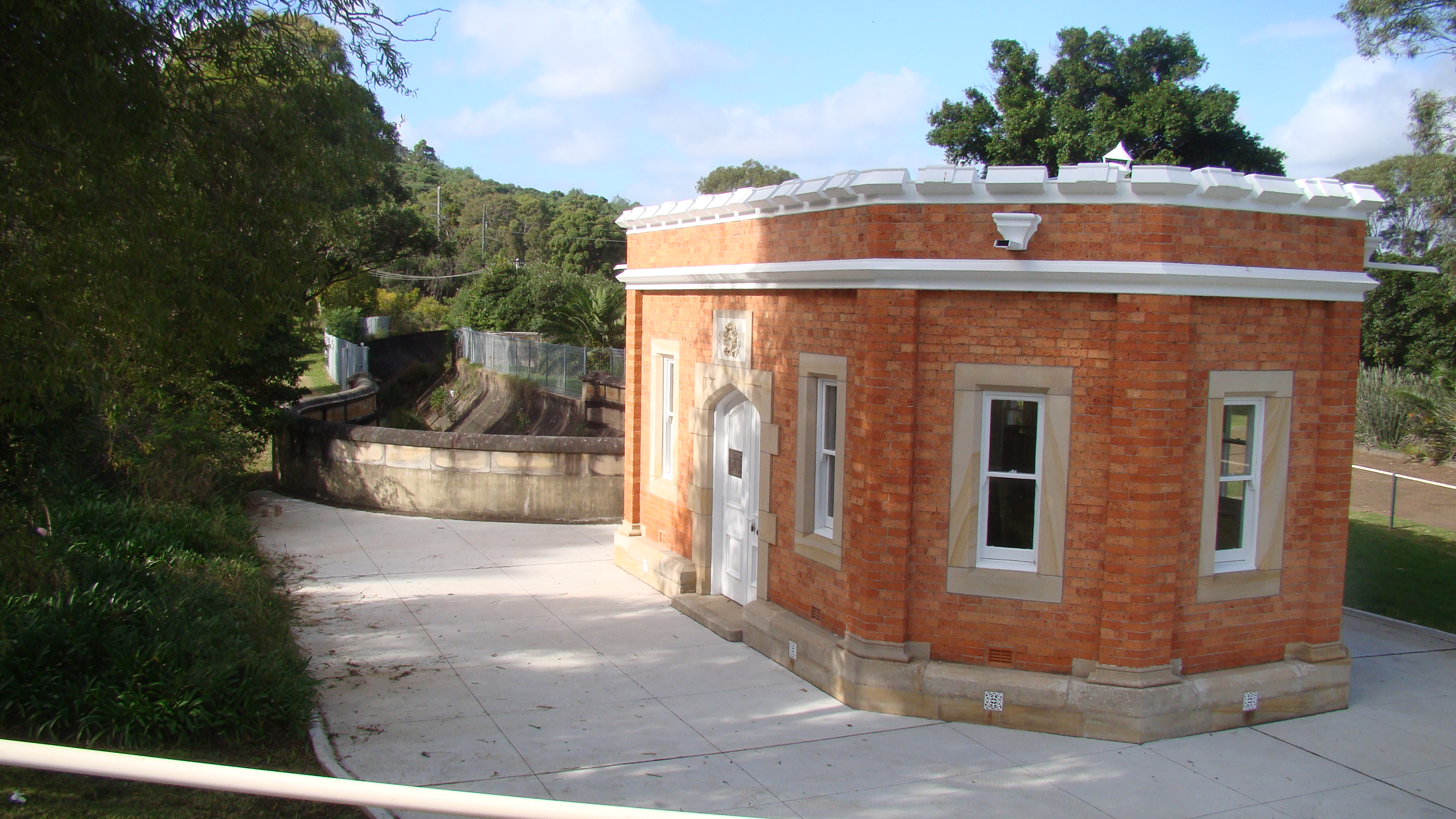
Valve house.

Prior to construction of the Prospect Water Filtration Plant, the water supply was delivered to the Lower Canal via the scour/outlet system, which consists of a number of components (including submerged inlet pipelines, outlet tower with access walkway, lower valve house with outlet to the Lower Canal, scour pipelines, various control and guard valves, brick-lined interconnecting tunnel between outlet valve and lower valve house, with ventilation shaft and access shaft/manhole, discharge pipelines under the Sydney Water Corporation-owned picnic area and an outlet structure.

The Outlet Tower is a small octagonal brick structure standing in the Reservoir waters with access by a small riveted iron footbridge. The tower extends below water with three main platforms accessed by ladders. The interconnecting tunnel is routed in a large U running from the Outlet Tower, into the hillside, then curving back to skirt the end of the Reservoir wall.

The Lower Valve House is similar in style to the Outlet Tower and originally controlled water entering the Lower Canal. The Lower Canal was decommissioned in the 1980s, but the original equipment in the Lower Valve House remains largely intact. The tunnel extends a short distance beyond the Lower Valve House.

The scour/outlet system originally terminated at the end of the tunnel, with a simple brick headwall with wing-walls and iron grill gate. In the late 1970s the scour system was extended with twin concrete pipes and a new outlet structure constructed closer to Prospect Creek. At that time the area downstream and east of the Reservoir wall was re-shaped to form a public picnic area, burying the end of the tunnel and new concrete pipes.

Since decommissioning the Lower Canal, the sole purpose of the scour/outlet system is to allow scouring or draining of the Reservoir. This is critical to ensure dam safety and consequently the system must be adequately maintained. The primary control valves were imported from England in 1887 and are believed to be the last remaining examples of their type in the world. They are in poor condition and at high risk of failure if operated to drain the Reservoir. They are beyond their operational life and cannot be refurbished. Consequently, SCA can no longer test the system as required or safely dewater the Reservoir under emergency conditions.

== Description ==
With the completion of the main storage dams, the reservoir's function has changed from largely being a storage apparatus to the main service reservoir and sedimentation basin for the metropolitan system. Prospect is an earth dam 2210 metres long and consists essentially of a puddle clay core with shoulders of selected earth placed in layers 300mm thick. During construction these were compacted by rolling. It was completed in 1888, and in 1898 the crest level was raised by 0.5 metres. The upstream slope of the wall is pitched with locally quarried diorite blocks 450 mm thick. The curtilage includes the boundary of the grounds owned by Sydney Water Corporation and the components within it, namely;

- the reservoir itself;
- side spillway and channel at the southern end of the wall;
- drainage and monitoring installations at the toe on the downstream face of the wall;
- the access road along the toe of the downstream face of the wall; and
- the outlet works which connect the stored water to the Lower Canal – consisting of outlet tower, pipelines, valve house and valve, scour lines and valves, and the other metering, screening and control installations.

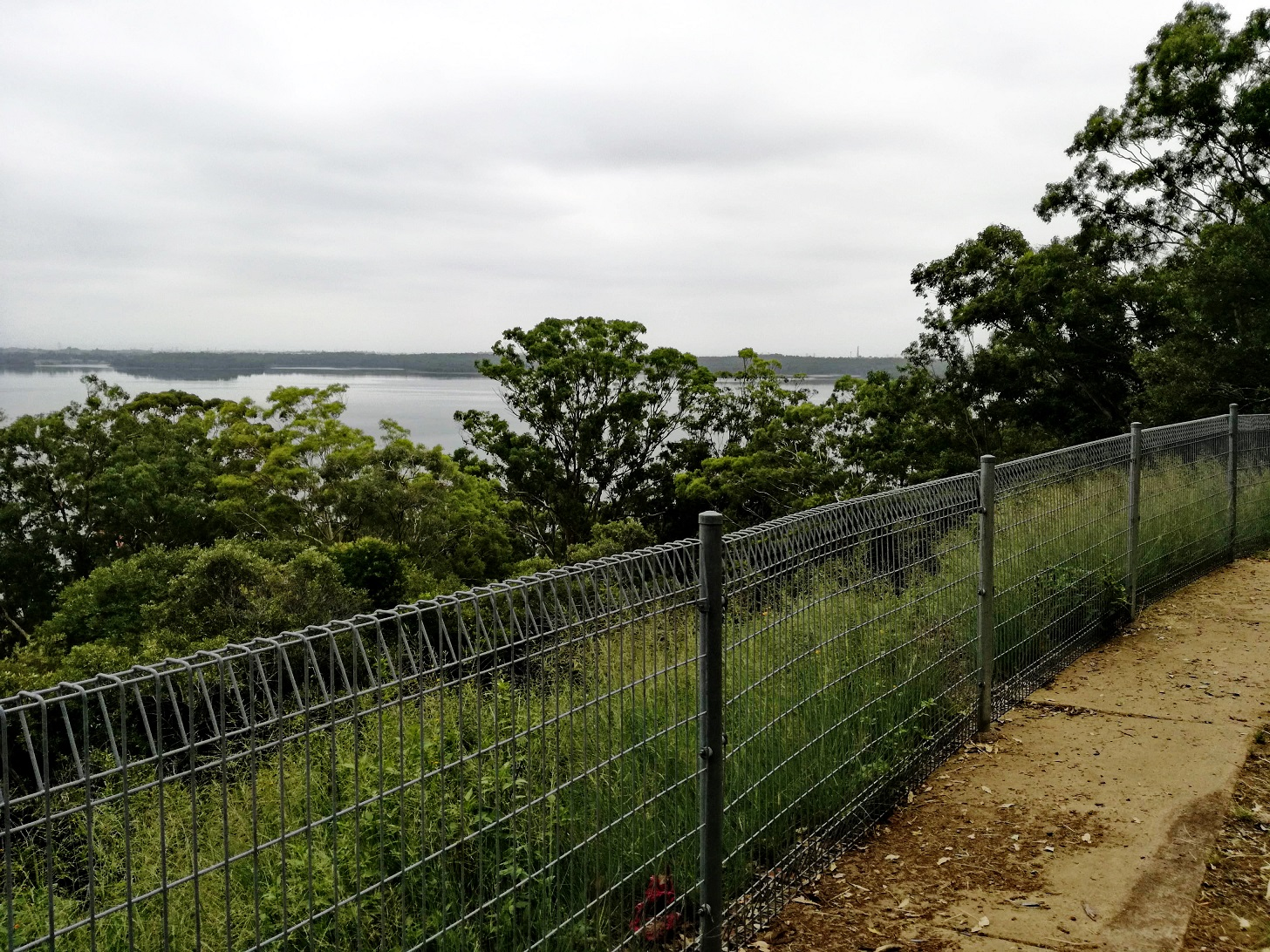
Northwest view of the dam from George Maunder lookout (upper level).

The state heritage listing includes Prospect Reservoir, landscape elements and all associated structures, including pumping stations, to the property boundary. The environs of the reservoir and hence the listing also include a wide range of items, which relate to later amplification of water supply. These include examples of 1920s and 30s pumping stations, a residence, and the 72 in (1,800 mm) main, constructed between the Upper Canal and Pipe Head in 1937. Later items associated with the Warragamba Supply Scheme and more modern developments include several more recent pumping stations, screening and boosting plants on the eastern and southern sides of the Reservoir, and the 84 inches (2,100 mm) water main from Prospect, to Pipe Head, completed in 1958.

=== Ecology ===
The immediate catchment area of the reservoir is almost entirely vegetated. This vegetation, cleared during settlement, has recovered to be one of the finest examples of the native bushland left in the western suburbs of Sydney. The bushland surrounding Prospect Reservoir is classified as Cumberland Plain Woodland (CPW). Cumberland Plain Woodland is listed at state and federal levels as an endangered ecological community. Legislation at both levels provides a framework for the protection of ecological communities under threat. Despite the lower quality of bushland this site still has significant ecological importance. If rehabilitated, it would significantly improve ecological connectivity, especially between Prospect Reservoir and the riparian vegetation along Eastern Creek.

== Continuing use ==
Since the Prospect Water Filtration Plant was completed in 1996, untreated water is generally not drawn from Prospect reservoir any more. Instead, the water is piped to the filtration plant directly from Warragamba Dam. The reservoir remains a part of Sydney Water's storage network, however it is anticipated that it will only be utilised for water supply purposes on average of five days in any five-year period. As the site attracts up to half a million visitors annually, recreational use of the site is carefully managed to ensure the water remains suitable for supplementing Sydney Water's requirements.

=== Recreational use ===
The reservoir has a large recreational area on its eastern side with a number of park precincts that feature picnic spots, lookouts and BBQs. The reserve is accessed by William Lawson Drive from Reservoir Road, which can be entered from Western Motorway to the north or Prospect Highway to the southeast. The Prospect Reservoir is open to public during the week and weekends (but not on public holidays) from 6:00 AM to 6:30 PM during daylight saving time and from 7:00 AM to 4:30 PM during non daylight saving time.

== Heritage listing ==
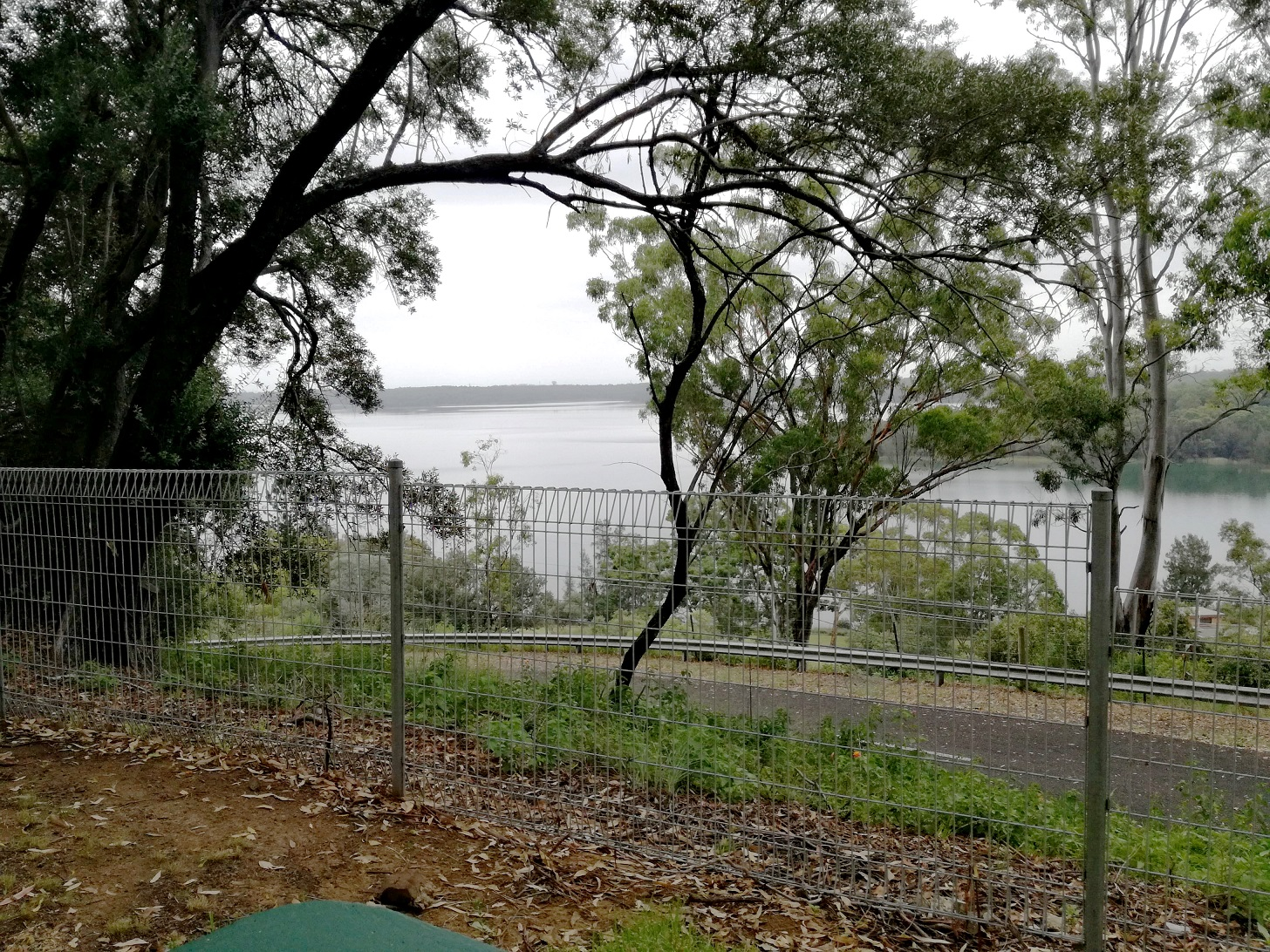
Southwest view of the dam.

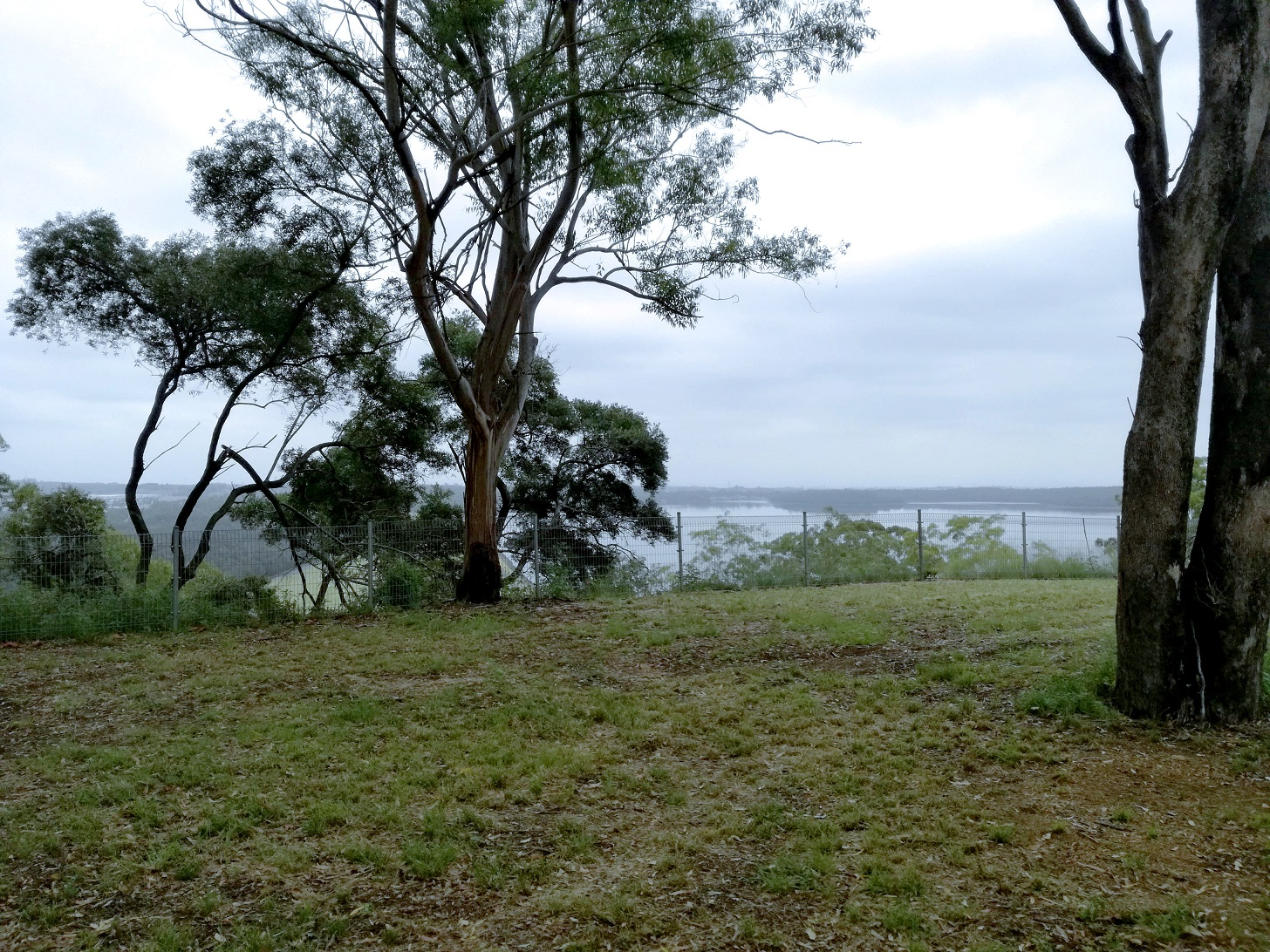
Panoramic view of Prospect Reservoir from the Upper George Maunder lookout area.

Prospect Reservoir is historically significant at the state level as it is a central element of the Sydney water supply system. As a part of the Upper Nepean Scheme, the Reservoir has continued to supply water to Sydney for over 120 years, and generally still operates in the same way as it was originally constructed. That it has continued to be used since its construction reflects the inventive and progressive way in which the reservoir was designed and built, and this contributes to its significance greatly.

The Reservoir reflects three significant changes in municipal life during the late 19th century; the development of water and general public utility services; the importance of ensuring an adequate and dependable centralised water supply; and the collective bureaucratic response to the delivery of capital works of this nature.

Built between 1882 and 1888, it was an outstanding achievement in civil engineering technology at the time, using innovative design and construction methods. It has a high level of historical engineering significance.

Prospect Reservoir is strongly associated with the Harbours and Rivers Branch of the NSW Public Works Department, particularly Edward Orpen Moriarty, Head of the branch at the time of the Reservoir's construction, and later with the Board of Water Supply and Sewerage (later the Metropolitan Water and Sewerage Board) and most recently, with the Sydney Catchment Authority.

The Reservoir area is aesthetically significant, as a picturesque site with a large expanse of water, parklands, landscaping and bush. The place is valuable for its recreational amenity for passive recreation, punctuating the monotony of the surrounding urban landscape. It has been used for recreation by the community for generations.

It continues to regulate the release of water from Prospect Reservoir to the Lower Canal and the Sydney Distribution system.

The place also contains examples of functional colonial architecture.

The listing includes Prospect Reservoir, landscape elements and all associated structures, including pumping stations, to the property boundary. The environs of the reservoir and hence this listing also include a wide range of items, which relate to later amplification of water supply. These include examples of 1920s and 30s pumping stations, a residence, and the 72 in (1,800 mm) main, constructed between the Upper Canal and Pipe Head in 1937. Later items associated with the Warragamba Supply Scheme and more modern developments include several more recent pumping stations, screening and boosting plants on the eastern and southern sides of the Reservoir, and the 84 inches (2,100 mm) water main from Prospect, to Pipe Head, completed in 1958.

Prospect Reservoir and surrounding area was listed on the New South Wales State Heritage Register on 18 November 1999 having satisfied the following criteria.

The place possesses uncommon, rare or endangered aspects of the cultural or natural history of New South Wales.

This item is assessed as historically rare state-wide. This item is assessed as scientifically rare state-wide.

The place is important in demonstrating the principal characteristics of a class of cultural or natural places/environments in New South Wales.

This item is assessed as aesthetically representative locally.

== Engineering heritage award ==
The dam received a Historic Engineering Marker from Engineers Australia as part of its Engineering Heritage Recognition Program.

== See also ==
- Bankstown Reservoir
- Chipping Norton Lake
- Geography of Sydney
- Lake Parramatta
- Prospect Hill
- Prospect Reservoir Valve House
- Sydney Catchment Authority
