= WaterNSW =

Statutory corporation of the New South Wales government, Australia

WaterNSW is a New South Wales Government–owned statutory corporation that is responsible for supplying the state's bulk water needs, operating the state's river systems and dams and the bulk water supply system for Greater Sydney and providing licensing and approval services to its customers and water resource information.

With more than 40 dams across the state, WaterNSW supplies two-thirds of water used in NSW to regional towns, irrigators, Sydney Water and local water utilities. WaterNSW also owns and operates the largest surface and groundwater monitoring network in the southern hemisphere.

WaterNSW was established on 1 January 2015, under the Water NSW Act 2014, merging the State Water Corporation (which managed the states rivers and dams other than Sydney) and Sydney Catchment Authority which managed Greater Sydney's bulk water supply. On 1 July 2016, some compliance functions of the Department of Primary Industries were also transferred to WaterNSW.
