= Longwave (disambiguation) =

Longwave are parts of the radio spectrum with relatively long wavelengths.

Longwave or Long Wave may also refer to:

== Science and technology ==
- Outgoing longwave radiation, associated with the energy emitted from a planetary body
- Thermal radiation, when generated by the motion of relatively low-temperature particles
- Long wave macrotexture, a road characteristic

== Arts and entertainment ==
- Longwave (band), a rock band from Brooklyn, New York
- Long Wave, a Jeff Lynne album
- Longwave (film), a 2013 French-language Swiss-French-Portuguese film, original title Les Grandes Ondes (à l'ouest)

== Other uses ==
- Kondratiev wave, hypothesized cycle-like phenomena in economics
