= Sydney Water =

Utility in New South Wales, Australia

- Sydney Water logo

State-owned statutory corporation overview
- Formed: 1 July 1995
- Jurisdiction: Greater Metropolitan Sydney, Illawarra and the Blue Mountains
- Headquarters: 1 Smith Street, Parramatta
- Minister responsible: Treasurer of New South Wales
- State-owned statutory corporation executives: Darren Cleary, Managing Director; Niall Blair, Chair
- Parent State-owned statutory corporation: Government of New South Wales
- Website: www.sydneywater.com.au

Sydney Water, formally the Sydney Water Corporation, is a New South Wales Government–owned statutory corporation that provides potable drinking water, wastewater and some stormwater services to Greater Metropolitan Sydney, the Illawarra and the Blue Mountains regions, in the Australian state of New South Wales. Sydney Water operates a network of water resource recovery facilities, including the Malabar Wastewater Treatment Plant, one of the largest wastewater treatment facilities in Sydney. The wider Malabar wastewater system serves more than one-third of Sydney's population across southern and western Sydney.

== History ==
=== Foundations of Sydney's water supply (1788–1888) ===
Before European settlement in 1788, the area now occupied by Sydney was inhabited by the Gadigal people of the Eora Nation, who relied on its waterways for drinking water, food, transport and gathering places. Sydney was selected as the site of the First Fleet settlement partly because of its natural harbour and the availability of fresh water from the Tank Stream. Governor Arthur Phillip sought to protect the stream by prohibiting development along its banks, while regulations introduced in 1803 prohibited activities that polluted the watercourse. The origins of Sydney Water date to 26 March 1888, when the Metropolitan Water and Sewerage Amendment Act, 1888 was enacted, repealing provisions of the Sydney Corporation Act, 1879 relating to water supply and sewerage and transferring the property, powers and obligations of the Municipal Council to the Board of Water Supply and Sewerage.

Increasing urbanisation and industrial activity progressively contaminated the Tank Stream, leading to its abandonment as Sydney's principal water supply in 1826. Construction of Busby's Bore commenced the following year to convey water from the Lachlan Swamps (now Centennial Park) to Hyde Park, where it was distributed until 1858. Rapid population growth during the Australian gold rushes drove investment in new water supply and sewerage infrastructure, including the Bennelong Point Sewerage System (1857) and the Botany Swamps Water Supply Scheme (1859). Despite these improvements, untreated sewage continued to discharge into Sydney Harbour, contributing to pollution and outbreaks of typhoid fever and scarlet fever. The Sewerage and Health Board, established in 1875, proposed an integrated sewerage system serving Bondi, Botany Bay and Folly Point. During the 1880s, the Hudson Brothers Emergency Scheme supplemented Sydney's water supply from the incomplete Upper Nepean Scheme, while the Botany Sewage Farm became the city's first sewage recycling scheme, although it ultimately proved unsuccessful. The Upper Nepean Scheme subsequently linked the Nepean River, Cataract, Cordeaux and Avon rivers to Sydney through the Upper and Lower Canals, substantially increasing the city's water supply.

=== Metropolitan Water, Sewerage and Drainage Board (1924–1987) ===
In 1892, the Board of Water Supply and Sewerage was renamed the Metropolitan Board of Water Supply and Sewerage (MBWS&S), while Manly Dam was completed. The Board assumed responsibility for Sydney's major stormwater channels in 1894. Between 1898 and 1902, the Western, Southern and Northern sewerage systems were progressively completed, together with a network of 20 sewage pumping stations that ended the discharge of untreated sewage into Sydney Harbour, significantly improving public sanitation. During the early 20th century, Sydney's water supply expanded with the connection of Wollongong in 1903 and the construction of Cataract Dam (1907–1915), Cordeaux Dam (1918–1926), Avon Dam (1921–1927), Nepean Dam (1925–1935) and Woronora Dam (1927–1941). Major sewerage works included the Southern and Western Suburbs Ocean Outfall Sewer No. 1 (completed 1916), the Northern Suburbs Ocean Outfall Sewer (1916–1930), the Southern and Western Suburbs Ocean Outfall Sewer No. 2 (1936–1941), and the Bondi Sewage Treatment Plant (1936–1953). In 1922, engineer E. M. de Burgh designed the Middle Harbour Syphon, an inverted siphon carrying sewer pipes beneath waterways.

Storm drain cover in Western Sydney inscribed with the MWS&DB acronym, used by the Metropolitan Water, Sewerage and Drainage Board.

In 1924, the MBWS&S was renamed the Metropolitan Water, Sewerage and Drainage Board (MWS&DB), gaining control of its own finances before formally commencing operations on 31 March 1925 under the Water Supply, Sewerage and Drainage Act 1924. The Board was responsible for water supply, sewerage and stormwater drainage throughout the County of Cumberland, including the construction, operation and maintenance of water, sewerage and drainage infrastructure, sewage treatment, stormwater management and the extension of services to developing areas. It also produced detailed engineering survey plans documenting pipes, manholes, roads, tramways, railways, buildings, property boundaries and natural features across Sydney and its suburbs. Surveys date from 1904 to 1945, with most plans compiled between 1910 and 1940.

Between 1934 and 1942, Sydney experienced the Great Drought, during which dam storage fell to 12.5%, resulting in severe water restrictions until widespread rainfall replenished supplies in 1942. In 1980, the Blue Mountains water supply scheme was transferred to the MWS&DB. Between 1984 and 1990, deepwater ocean outfalls were constructed at the Bondi, North Head and Malabar wastewater treatment plants, significantly improving water quality at Sydney's beaches.

=== Modernisation and water security (1994–present) ===
The MWS&DB was renamed the Sydney Water Board in 1987 before being corporatised as the Sydney Water Corporation in 1994. The Prospect Water Filtration Plant was completed in 1996, followed by construction of the Northside Storage Tunnel to reduce wet weather sewer overflows into Sydney Harbour. In 1999, the Sydney Catchment Authority was established to manage Sydney's dams and catchments. During the early 2000s, Sydney Water introduced the Every Drop Counts Business Program and the Rouse Hill Recycled Water Scheme, while severe drought led to voluntary water restrictions in 2002 and mandatory restrictions in 2003. In 2004, the New South Wales Government released the Metropolitan Water Plan, proposing expanded wastewater recycling, improved water-use efficiency, leak reduction and construction of a desalination plant if dam storage levels fell to around 30%. Planning for the Sydney Desalination Plant began in 2005, with construction commencing in 2007. That year, the Water Industry Competition Act 2006 came into effect, allowing private sector competition in water and wastewater services, while Sydney Water also began constructing its headquarters in Parramatta. In 2009, the first private water licence was awarded to Veolia for a wastewater recycling project at Smithfield and Camellia.

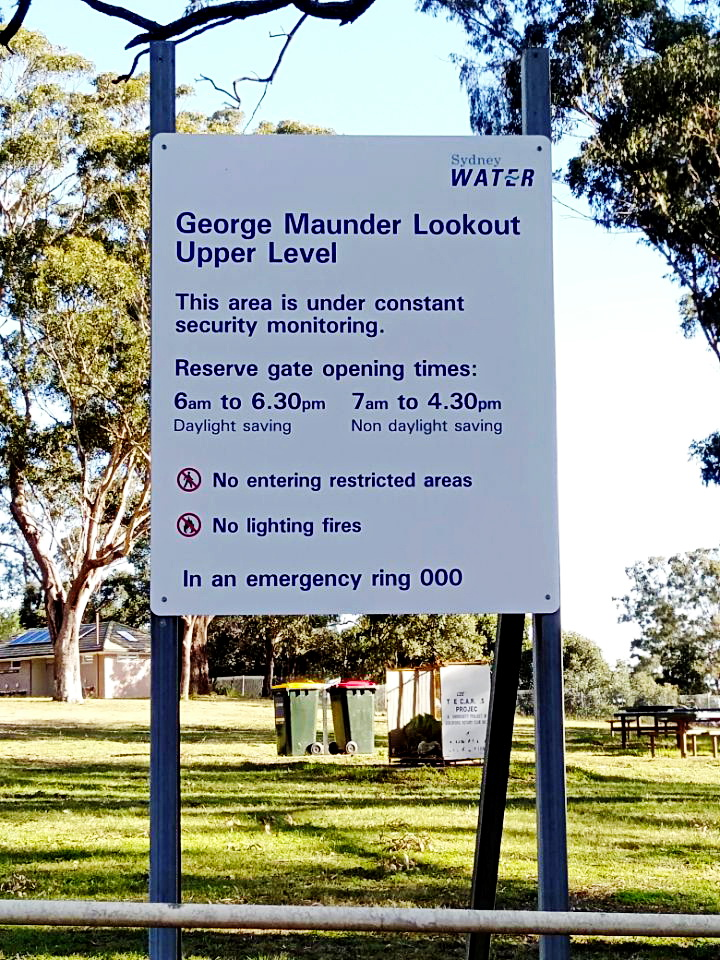
A sign authorised by Sydney Water (Prospect Nature Reserve)

The Sydney Desalination Plant at Kurnell opened in 2010, supplying drinking water to around 1.5 million people. The same year, the St Marys Advanced Water Recycling Plant began returning up to 18 billion litres of recycled water annually to the Hawkesbury-Nepean River. In 2011, Sydney Water opened the Water Recycling Education Centre, commissioned the Prospect Hydroelectric Plant and expanded its public engagement through social media. In 2012, the corporation entered into a long-term lease of the Sydney Desalination Plant. During 2023 New South Wales state election, confidential documents from KPMG and Clayton Utz regarding the privatisation of Sydney Water were made public. Dominic Perrottet, who was the Treasurer at the time had previously declared in March 2020 that he had no plans to even do a study on privatisation, but the documents revealed that studies had taken place in January 2020 and later in November 2021, with the reporting making it clear the study was done due to direct pressure from the Government. During and after the election NSW Labor pledged to enshrine government ownership of Sydney Water in the NSW state constitution.

=== Name changes ===
The forebears of Sydney Water include:

- Board of Water Supply and Sewerage (1888–1892)
- Metropolitan Board of Water Supply and Sewerage (1892–1925)
- Metropolitan Water Sewerage and Drainage Board (MWS & DB) (1925–1987)
- Water Board (1987–1994) which had also been the colloquial name for the organisation for much of its history in the 20th century, and persists among longer term employees and older members of the community to this day
- Sydney Water Corporation Limited (1995–1999)
- Sydney Water Corporation (1999–present) – with "Limited" being dropped when the corporation changed from a state-owned limited company to a statutory state-owned corporation.

== Water supply management ==
Sydney Water's management received extensive criticism following the 1998 Sydney water crisis regarding what was believed to be the large scale contamination of Sydney's raw water supply. The supposed contamination was heightened levels of cryptosporidium and giardia in Sydney's Warragamba Dam. This meant the public had to take extra steps in their own homes to ensure tap water was safe to drink. After this event, the Sydney Catchment Authority was created to manage Sydney's dams, reservoirs, raw water and catchment areas. The Chairman of Sydney Water, David Hill resigned ten days after the crisis and denied any responsibility, claiming he was leaving only to concentrate on his political career.

On 1 January 2015, The Sydney Catchment Authority was merged with State Water Corporation to form WaterNSW so that WaterNSW is now the supplier of raw water to Sydney Water.

In June 2022, Sydney Water started working with decentralised greywater recycling system producer Hydraloop for reducing water use.

== Water restrictions ==
Since June 2019 Sydney Water replaced water restrictions with Water Wise Rules. The Rules are:

Level 1 water restrictions (subject to change at any time by NSW Government)

- All hoses must now have a trigger nozzle.
- Handheld hoses, sprinklers, and watering systems may be used only before 10 am and after 4 pm on any day – to avoid the heat of the day
- No hosing of hard surfaces such as paths and driveways (spot cleaning hazards allowed). Washing vehicles is allowed.
- Fire hoses may be used for fire fighting activities only.

Commercial Businesses who use water in the course of their activities are required to apply for a permit, it's free and can be done via the internet or over the phone on 13 20 92, penalties may apply if caught working without a permit.

NSW government have empowered Sydney Water Community Water Officers the authority to impose fines of $220 for violations of the rules for individuals, $550 for businesses, and $2,200 for individuals and $4,400 for businesses water theft. Rules are enforced by Sydney Water staff known as Community Water Officers through random checks and intelligence gathered from the community.

== Headquarters and influence ==
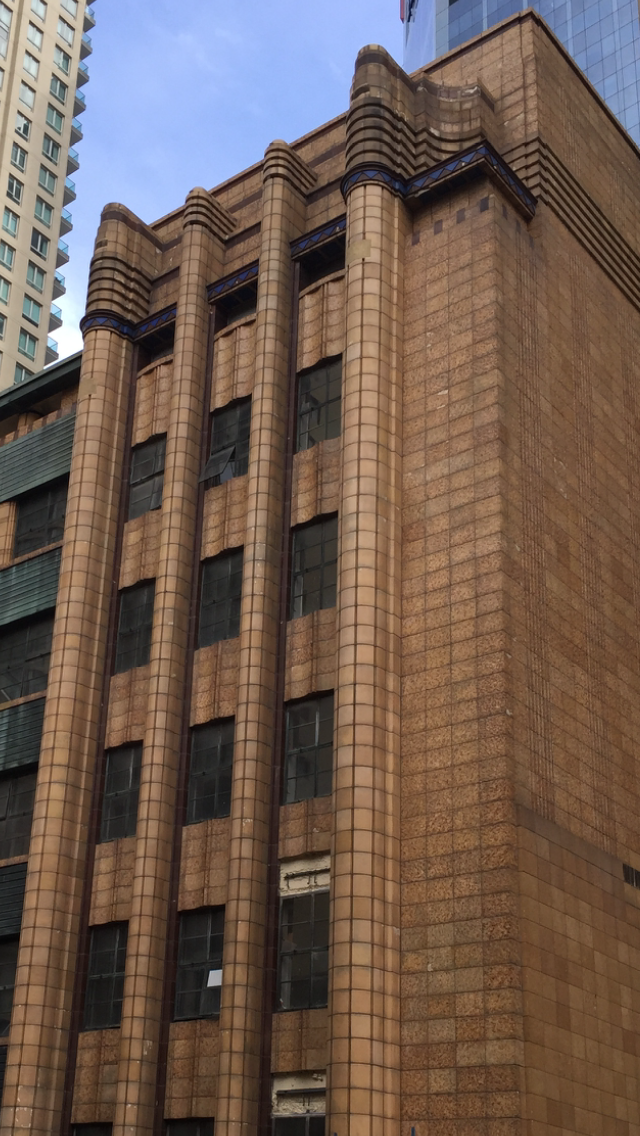
Part of the art deco façade of the former Metropolitan Water Sewerage & Drainage Board Building

Sydney Water, and its predecessors, had for virtually all of its existence dating back to the 19th century, been located in the Sydney central business district at the corner of Pitt and Bathurst streets, directly above Town Hall railway station. The central location of Sydney Water in Sydney reflected the organisation's strategic significance as the lead organisation in planning Sydney's growth and future expansion. Without water services, no residential or business growth could occur in Sydney, the Illawarra or Blue Mountains.

Sydney Water's headquarters were relocated to Parramatta in May 2009. The historic former headquarters building has been redeveloped into a hotel, with the adjacent 1969 building being extended into a skyscraper.

The developer, Brookfield Multiplex, valued the new Parramatta headquarters project at A$176 million. Under this deal, rather than Sydney Water owning its own building, the corporation would enter a long-term lease with a private sector provider, who would own and maintain the corporate head office, at an annual rent charged to the NSW taxpayer.

The main suburban offices throughout Sydney were all closed in the mid-2000s, including offices at Blacktown, Rockdale, Liverpool and Chatswood, with services consolidated to the Headquarters for efficiency. The Rockdale office was opened in 1990 and closed in 2004 These offices were traditionally dealing with customer queries, but saw a drop in use as customers started paying their bills via the internet

== Desalination ==
In early 2010 operations of the Sydney Desalination Plant began; with a licence granted to Veolia Water to operate the plant and supply Sydney Water with drinking water. In 2012, the NSW Government entered into a 50–year lease with Sydney Desalination Plant Pty Ltd (DSP), a company jointly owned by the Ontario Teachers' Pension Plan (50%) and two funds managed by Hastings Funds Management Limited: Utilities Trust of Australia and The Infrastructure Fund (together 50%). The terms of the A$2.3 billion lease lock Sydney Water into a 50–year water supply agreement with DSP.

== Land Ownership ==
Sydney Water is the owner of numerous parklands and public areas in Sydney. Local councils and sporting facilities typically license or lease these properties from Sydney Water, in order to enable public use. Many sites are on land that are part of the historic Botany Water Reserves. Properties currently owned by Sydney Water include:

- Bonnie Doon Golf Club, Pagewood
- The Lakes Golf Club, Eastlakes
- Eastlake Golf Club, Daceyville
- Mutch Park, Pagewood
- Astrolabe Park, Daceyville
- Linear Park, Mascot
- Gardens-R-Us (closed), Eastlakes
- The Old Como railway bridge
- The Centennial Park Reservoir
- The Woollahra Reservoir
- The Hyde Park Obelisk
- Gilgandra Reserve, North Bondi
- Niblick Street Reserve, North Bondi
- Wolli Creek Regional Park

== Executives ==
From 1888 to 1987, Sydney Water and its predecessors were managed by the president, who effectively served as chair of the board and managing director. However, with the passing of the Water Board Act, 1987, the roles were split between an executive managing director and a non-executive chairman of the board.

=== Presidents, 1888–1987 ===
| # | President | Term | Notes |
Board of Water Supply and Sewerage
| 1 | Thomas Rowe | 26 March 1888 – 24 March 1892 | |
Metropolitan Board of Water Supply and Sewerage
| 2 | Cecil West Darley | 24 March 1892 – 20 March 1896 | |
| – | Thomas Rowe | 20 March 1896 – 14 January 1899 | |
| 3 | Jacob Garrard | 24 January 1899 – 22 March 1904 | |
| 4 | Thomas William Keele | 22 March 1904 – 22 March 1908 | |
| 5 | William James Millner | 22 March 1908 – 31 March 1925 | |
Metropolitan Water Sewerage and Drainage Board
| 6 | Thomas Bryce Cooper | 31 March 1925 – 30 April 1935 | |
| 7 | Thomas Haynes Upton | 30 April 1935 – 15 April 1955 | |
| 8 | John William Goodsell | 15 April 1955 – 23 September 1960 | |
| 9 | Stanley Haviland | 23 September 1960 – 22 September 1965 | |
| 10 | Edwin James Walder | 22 September 1965 – 15 October 1981 | |
| 11 | Eric George Warrell | 15 October 1981 – 16 June 1987 | |

=== Managing Directors, 1987–date ===
| # | Managing Director | Term | Notes |
Water Board
| 1 | Robert Ernest Wilson | 23 October 1987 – 2 April 1993 | |
| 2 | Paul Anthony Broad | 5 April 1993 – 31 December 1994 | |
Sydney Water Corporation
| – | Paul Anthony Broad | 1 January 1995 – 29 September 1997 | |
| 3 | Christopher Pollett | 29 September 1997 – 19 August 1998 | |
| 4 | Warren Hart | 19 August 1998 – 16 November 1998 | |
| 5 | Alex Walker | 16 November 1998 – 30 November 2002 | |
| – | Ron Quill (Acting) | 30 November 2002 – 26 May 2003 | |
| 6 | Gregory Francis Robinson | 26 May 2003 – 26 February 2004 | |
| 7 | William David Evans | 27 February 2004 – 1 August 2006 | |
| 8 | Kerry Schott | 2 August 2006 – 1 August 2011 | |
| 9 | Kevin Young | 1 August 2011 – 31 July 2019 | |
| 10 | Roch Cheroux | 2 September 2019 – 28 March 2025 | |
| - | Paul Plowman (Acting) | 28 March 2025 – 17 November 2025 | |
| 11 | Darren Cleary | 17 November 2025 – present | |

=== Chairs, 1987–date ===
| # | Chairman | Term | Notes |
Water Board
| 1 | David Anthony Harley | 19 October 1988 – 15 September 1992 | |
| 2 | John McMurtrie | February 1993 – 31 December 1994 | |
Sydney Water Corporation
| – | John McMurtrie | 1 January 1995 – 21 November 1997 | |
| 3 | David Hill | 21 November 1997 – August 1998 | |
| 4 | Gabrielle Kibble | August 1998 – 31 May 2007 | |
| 5 | Thomas Gregory Parry | 1 June 2007 – 30 September 2013 | |
| 6 | Bruce Morgan | 1 October 2013 – 30 September 2021 | |
| 7 | Grant King | 1 October 2021 – 30 September 2024 | |
| 8 | Niall Blair | 1 October 2024 – present | |

== Coat of arms ==
Coat of arms of Sydney Water

Adopted
Granted to the MWSDB by the Kings of Arms, 1 March 1965.
Crest
In front of a pick and scythe in saltire ensigned with a mural coronet Azure a wheel Argent.
Torse
A wreath of the colours (Argent and Azure).
Helm
A closed helmet.
Escutcheon
Argent gutty, a water bouget and in base two bars wavy Azure on a chief nebuly Gules an escallop Argent between a lion passant and a fleece Or.
Supporters
On the dexter side a figure representing Aquarius proper habited Azure and on the sinister side a figure representing Hygieia proper vested Argent cloaked Azure.
Compartment
A mount Vert and in base two bars wavy Azure.
Motto
Latin: Serviendo Sanitas ("Serving health")
Other elements
Mantled Argent and Azure.
Badge
A water bouget Azure encircled by a Serpent devouring its tail head to the dexter Vert.
Symbolism
The wavy (nebuly) partition line represents clouds, which produce the drops of rain. The rain drops are grouped in threes to represent the Board's three major water catchments. The water bouget represents the primary responsibility of water supply and storage, and the two wavy bars underneath represent the sea and waterways to which the water is discharged via the sewerage and stormwater systems. In the top of the shield, the shell escallop is taken from the arms of Sydney's namesake, Thomas Townshend, 1st Viscount Sydney, and the gold lion and fleece are taken from the Coat of arms of New South Wales. The crest represents the community which the Board services, with the wheel representing industry, the anchor representing the three ports of Sydney, Botany Bay, and Port Kembla, and the scythe representing agriculture. The supporters represent the functions of water supply (Aquarius) and sanitation (Hygeia), and are derived from the arms granted to the London Metropolitan Water Board.
