= Narellan railway station =

Former railway station in Sydney, Australia

Narellan
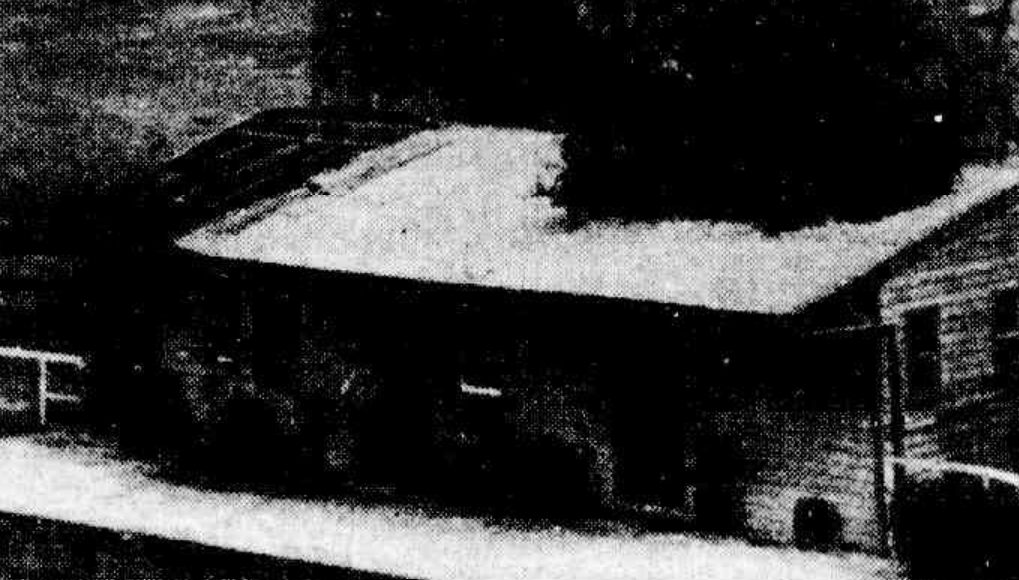
- A newspaper print of Narellan after storm damage in 1947

General information
- Location: Camden Valley Way, Narellan, New South Wales; Australia
- Coordinates: 34°02′22″S 150°44′12″E
- Operator: Department of Railways
- Line: Camden
- Distance: 63.101 kilometres (39.209 mi) from Central
- Platforms: 1 (1 side)
- Tracks: 3

Construction
- Structure type: Ground

Other information
- Status: Demolished

History
- Opened: 10 March 1882
- Closed: 1 January 1963
- Rebuilt: 1893; 1901; 1909

Services
Preceding station	Former services	Following station
Grahams Hill towards Camden	Camden Line	Currans Hill towards Campbelltown
Location

Narellan railway station was a railway station on the Camden railway line, serving the suburb of Narellan, New South Wales, Australia. The site of the former station is now occupied by the Narellan Town Centre.

== History ==
Narellan opened in 1882 with the rest of the original line. The station itself was larger than its neighbours, consisting of a brick platform with a wooden station building, built in 1909. Built on a passing loop, a siding and coal loader was located opposite the passenger platform.

The Camden railway line including Narellan, was closed on 1 January 1963, and the station was subsequently left abandoned until it was fully demolished in the 1990s.

== Future proposals ==
In the 2010s, a Transport for NSW report, 'North South Rail Line and South West Rail Link Extension Corridors' identified the need to build a rail line that would serve the South Western Sydney area. This included a new station located at Narellan, due to the high growth of the area. Narellan would initially serve as the terminus of the southern branch of the extension, with a further extension to Macarthur also an option.

The alignment of the proposed line has been criticised as its construction would result in the demolition of new housing developments in the area. However, the government has proposed an alternative underground alignment that would follow the same route with a more minimal impact.
