= Currans Hill railway station =

Former railway station in Sydney, Australia

Currans Hill
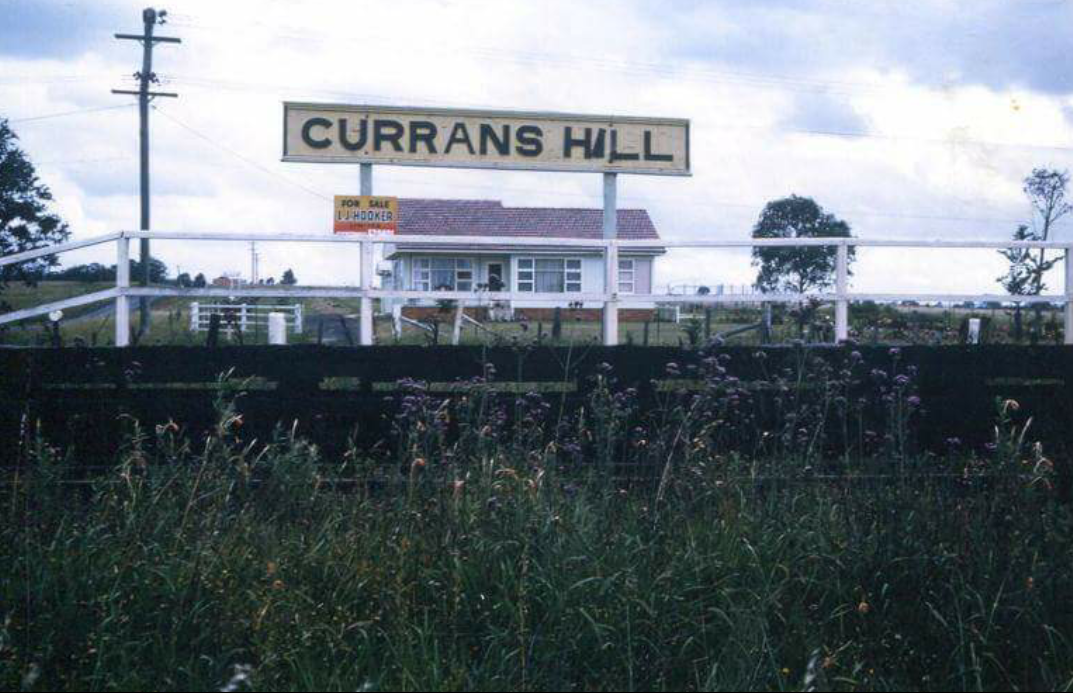
- The station in the 1960s

General information
- Location: Narellan Road, Smeaton Grange, New South Wales; Australia
- Coordinates: 34°02′41″S 150°45′27″E
- Operator: Department of Railways
- Line: Camden
- Distance: 61.326 kilometres (38.106 mi) from Central
- Platforms: 1 (1 side)
- Tracks: 1

Construction
- Structure type: Ground

Other information
- Status: Demolished

History
- Opened: 10 March 1882
- Closed: 1 January 1963
- Rebuilt: 1904
- Former names: Curran's Hill (1882-unknown)

Services
Preceding station	Former services	Following station
Narellan towards Camden	Camden Line	Kenny Hill towards Campbelltown
Location

Currans Hill railway station was a railway station on the Camden railway line, serving the suburb of Currans Hill, New South Wales, Australia. It was located in what is now the modern-day suburb of Smeaton Grange.

== History ==
Currans Hill opened in 1882 with the rest of the original line. It was originally named Curran's Hill, and much like the suburb itself, was named after an early resident, Mr Michael Curran who was a resident until his death at 90 in 1916. However, the apostrophe was gradually dropped from the name. The station itself consisted of only a small wooden platform and a signboard which was first built in 1904.

Currans Hill was closed alongside the ceasing of services between Campbelltown and Camden on 1 January 1963, and the station was demolished.

In 2018, a Transport for NSW report, 'North South Rail Line and South West Rail Link Extension Corridors' identified the need to build a rail line that would serve the South-West Sydney area. Currans Hill was not identified as a future station, but would be served by the proposed extension.
