= Macarthur railway station =

Railway station in Sydney, New South Wales, Australia

Macarthur
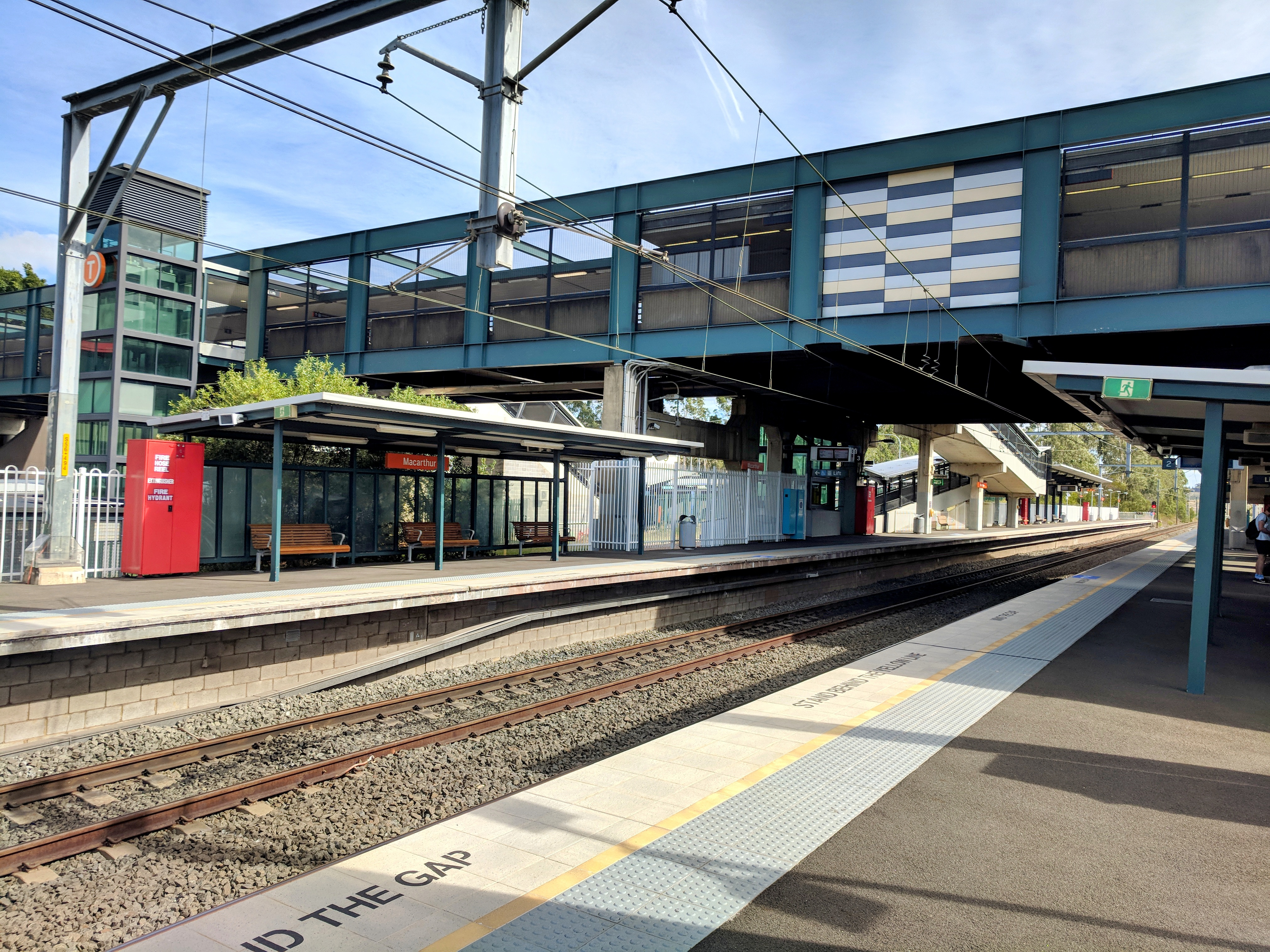
- Southbound view of platforms and concourse, April 2018

General information
- Location: Menangle Road, Campbelltown
- Coordinates: 34°04′19″S 150°47′49″E
- Elevation: 77 metres (253 ft)
- Owner: Transport Asset Manager of New South Wales
- Operator: Sydney Trains
- Line: Main Southern
- Distance: 43.7 kilometres (27.15 miles) from Central
- Platforms: 3 (1 island, 1 side)
- Tracks: 4
- Connections: Bus

Construction
- Structure type: Ground
- Accessible: Yes

Other information
- Status: Weekdays: Staffed: 6am to 10pm: Weekends and public holidays: Staffed: 6am to 7pm
- Station code: MCA
- Website: Transport for NSW

History
- Opened: 28 July 1985; 41 years ago

Passengers
- 2025: 1,573,490 (year); 4,311 (daily) (Sydney Trains)
- Rank: 91

Services
Preceding station	Sydney Trains	Following station
Terminus	Airport & South Line	Campbelltown towards City Circle
Preceding station	Intercity Trains	Following station
Menangle Park towards Moss Vale or Goulburn	Southern Highlands Line	Campbelltown Terminus or towards Central
Location

Macarthur railway station is located on the Main Southern line, serving the Sydney suburb of Campbelltown. It is served by Sydney Trains' T8 Airport & South and NSW TrainLink's Southern Highlands Line services. It is the southern extremity of the electrified Sydney Trains network.

== History ==
In 1976, a plan was created to build a new station 488m in the southern direction of the existing Campbelltown railway station. The plan for a "new" Campbelltown station was dropped and the plan was modified to be an unstaffed, new, station. The plan was later changed to be 1800m to its current location, being built to serve a shopping centre being built 500m away. The station was originally supposed to be named Ambarvale, after the suburb it is located, but this was later changed to Macarthur, the name of the region. Construction started in November 1983 with the station opening on 28 July 1985. It was initially only served by a few peak-hour services until a new timetable was introduced on 16 November 1986.

The station initially consisted of two side platforms. Because suburban trains terminating on the main lines caused congestion to through trains, a side turnback platform was added in time for the 2000 Summer Olympics.

Under the CityRail Clearways Project, Macarthur received an upgrade. This work, completed in late 2010, included refurbishment of the station, a bus interchange, and a new carpark. In a proposed second stage, Macarthur was to receive a fourth platform for through trains heading south, however, the project was cancelled.

In January 2013, the Southern Sydney Freight Line opened to the west of the station.

Electrification through the Macarthur station site was completed in 1968 as part of the Liverpool-Glenlee electrification project. Electric passenger trains terminated at Campbelltown, but freight trains continued to Glenlee coal siding and loader (now in Mount Annan) so that electrically hauled coal trains could connect it and Port Kembla. The Glenlee coal loader has closed and electric trains are stopped at Macarthur, with the wires only extending a few hundred metres down the line.

== Platforms and services ==
Platform	Line	Stopping pattern	Notes
1	Airport & South Line	services to Central & the City Circle via Revesby	
2	Airport & South Line	services to Central & the City Circle via Revesby	
2	Southern Highlands Line	services to Campbelltown morning services to Central (1 weekday, 2 weekend)	
3	Southern Highlands Line	services to Moss Vale evening services to Goulburn (2 weekday, 1 weekend)	

== Transport links ==
Macarthur station is served by various bus routes with Transit Systems being the primary operator. The bus interchange is located on Menangle Road.

- 877: Campbelltown to Kearns via Eagle Vale & Eschol Park
- 879: Campbelltown to Leumeah via Blair Athol
- 880: Campbelltown to Minto via Eagle Vale & Kearns
- 886: Campbelltown to Glen Alpine
- 887: Campbelltown to Wollongong via Appin
- 888: Campbelltown to St Helens Park via Ambarvale & Rosemeadow
- 889: Campbelltown to Menangle via Menangle Park
- 890: Campbelltown to Harrington Park via Narellan Vale & Narellan
- 890C: Campbelltown to Camden via Narellan
- 891: Campbelltown to Mount Annan via Currans Hill
- 892: Campbelltown to Mount Annan via Narellan Vale
- 893: Campbelltown to Narellan via Elderslie & Spring Farm
- 895: Campbelltown to Camden South via Camden
- 896: Campbelltown to Oran Park via Gregory Hills

Macarthur Station is also served by one NightRide route:

- NightRide route N30: Macarthur to Town Hall station
