= Kenny Hill railway station =

Former railway station in Sydney, Australia

Kenny Hill

General information
- Location: Narellan Road, Currans Hill, New South Wales; Australia
- Coordinates: 34°03′18″S 150°46′35″E
- Operator: Department of Railways
- Line: Camden
- Distance: 58.942 kilometres (36.625 mi) from Central
- Platforms: 1 (1 side)
- Tracks: 1

Construction
- Structure type: Ground

Other information
- Status: Demolished

History
- Opened: 10 March 1882
- Closed: 1 January 1963
- Rebuilt: 1910
- Former names: Kenny's Hill (1936-1938)

Services
Preceding station	Former services	Following station
Currans Hill towards Camden	Camden Line	Maryfields towards Campbelltown
Location

Kenny Hill railway station was a railway station on the Camden railway line, serving the nearby area of Kenny Hill in modern-day Currans Hill, New South Wales, Australia.

== History ==
Kenny Hill opened in 1882 with the rest of the original line, as Kenny's Hill, but was renamed Kenny Hill a year later. The station itself consisted of only a small wooden platform and a signboard, first built in 1910 after calls for the erection of this facility.

Kenny Hill was closed alongside the ceasing of services between Campbelltown and Camden on 1 January 1963. Whilst the station has since been demolished, the railway cutting is still visible from Narellan Road.

== Kenny Hill ==
The name of the station was taken from the nearby Kenny Hill itself, named after Dr William Kenny, a resident of the area in the mid-19th century. The Camden railway line climbed the hill between Maryfields and Kenny Hill stations, with the steep 1:19 grade limiting the capabilities of the line. It was common for trains to first fail to reach the top, and many services would divide to allow the train to continue past the hill. On the day of the last service, the tracks climbing up the hill were covered in grease.
