= Grahams Hill railway station =

Former railway station in Sydney, Australia

Grahams Hill

General information
- Location: Grahams Hill Road, Narellan, New South Wales; Australia
- Coordinates: 34°02′27″S 150°43′52″E
- Operator: Department of Railways
- Line: Camden
- Distance: 63.705 kilometres (39.584 mi) from Central
- Platforms: 1 (1 side)
- Tracks: 1

Construction
- Structure type: Ground

Other information
- Status: Demolished

History
- Opened: 10 March 1882
- Closed: 1 January 1963
- Former names: Oxley Street (1882-1883)

Services
| Preceding station | Former services | Following station |
|---|---|---|
| Kirkham towards Camden | Camden Line | Narellan towards Campbelltown |
Location

Grahams Hill railway station was a railway station on the Camden railway line, serving the area of Grahams Hill in the suburb of Narellan, New South Wales, Australia.

== History ==
Grahams Hill opened in 1882 with the rest of the original line, originally as Oxley Street. It was renamed Grahams Hill the following year. The station itself was much smaller than others on the line, such as its neighbour Narellan.

On 1 January 1963, all stations along the Camden railway line including Grahams Hill were closed. The station was subsequently demolished.

The original railway crossing signs have since been moved nearby the Narellan Hotel, and a train carriage on the site acknowledges the railway's history.

== Future proposals ==
In the 2010s, a Transport for NSW report, 'North South Rail Line and South West Rail Link Extension Corridors' proposed the construction of a rail line to serve the South Western Sydney area, including a station at Narellan close to the former site of Grahams Hill. The proposal was formed in response to the increasing demand for public transport to service the growing area. Narellan would serve as the terminus of the southern branch of the extension, although a further extension to Macarthur was also proposed.
