= Magdalene Catholic College =

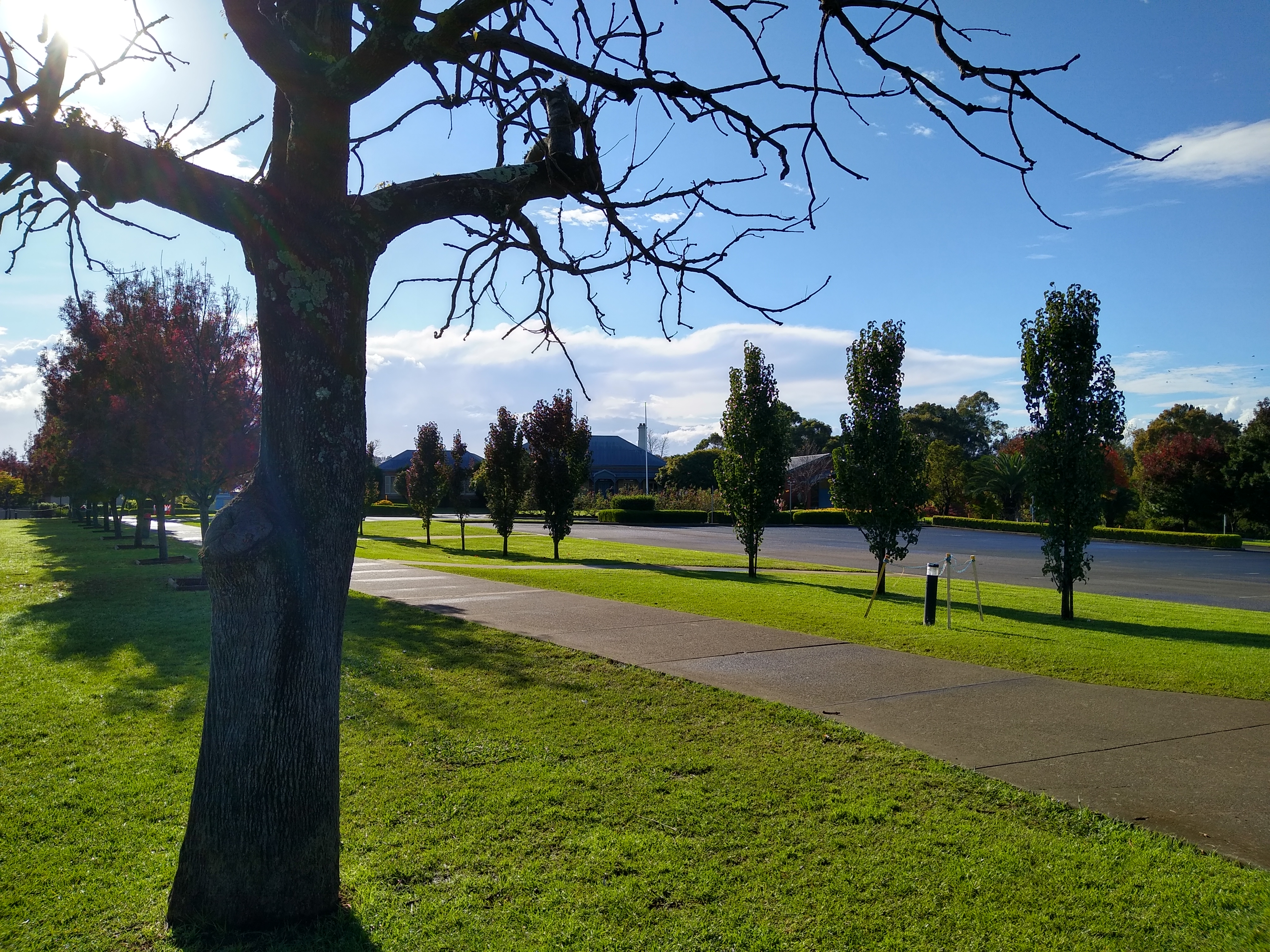

Location
- Smeaton Grange, Macarthur, New South Wales; Australia; 34°02′37″S 150°45′24″E

Information
- Former name: Magdalene Catholic High School
- School type: Independent co-educational secondary day school
- Motto: Latin: QuiaU Dominum Vidi (Because I have seen the Lord)
- Denomination: Roman Catholic
- Established: 1999; 27 years ago
- Oversight: Roman Catholic Diocese of Wollongong
- Principal: David Cloran
- Staff: 94
- Years: 7–12
- Enrolment: 1,012 (2016)
- Area: 10 hectares (25 acres)
- Colors: Light blue, navy, and red
- Website: www.mccdow.catholic.edu.au

Magdalene Catholic College is an independent Roman Catholic co-educational secondary day school located in Smeaton Grange, in the Macarthur region of outer south-western Sydney, New South Wales, Australia. The current principal is David Cloran.

== History ==
Magdalene Catholic High School was established in 1999 by the Roman Catholic Diocese of Wollongong in a temporary location at Mater Dei near Camden with 90 students and 7 teaching staff. The school was built to serve Parishes of the south-western Macarthur Region, specifically Camden, Narellan, Mount Annan and The Oaks.

A ten-hectare (twenty-five-acre) parcel of land was bought from the Patrician Brothers in Smeaton Grange. This land was previously used as a novitiate and retreat centre. In 2000 the School migrated to this new site, occupying the existing buildings. During 2001 the first of five construction stages had completed, and students were able to start moving into the first permanent buildings. By 2004 all five construction stages had completed, this was also when the first Year 12 cohort sat the Higher School Certificate examinations.

== Principals ==
The following individuals have served as College Principal:

Ordinal	Officeholders	Term start	Term end	Time in office	Notes
1	Alan McManus	1999	2009	9–10 years	
2	John Barrington	2010	2010	0 years	Acting
3	John Lo Cascio	2011	2016	4–5 years	
4	Matthew McMahon	2017	2022	8–9 years	
3	David Cloran	2023	Ongoing	4–5 years	
