= Kirkham railway station =

Former railway station in Sydney, Australia

Kirkham
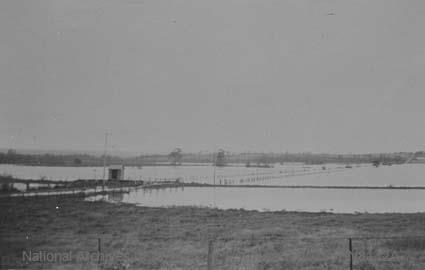
- Kirkham surrounded by floodwaters in 1949

General information
- Location: Kirkham Lane, Elderslie, New South Wales; Australia
- Coordinates: 34°02′48″S 150°43′00″E
- Operator: Department of Railways
- Line: Camden
- Distance: 65.140 kilometres (40.476 mi) from Central
- Platforms: 1 (1 side)
- Tracks: 1

Construction
- Structure type: Ground

Other information
- Status: Demolished

History
- Opened: 10 March 1882
- Closed: 1 January 1963
- Former names: Penrith Road (1882-1883); Kirkham Lane (1883-1938)

Services
Preceding station	Former services	Following station
Elderslie towards Camden	Camden Line	Grahams Hill towards Campbelltown
Location

Kirkham railway station was a railway station on the Camden railway line, serving the suburb of Kirkham, New South Wales, Australia. Its location is situated in the modern suburb of Elderslie.

== History ==
Kirkham opened in 1882 with the rest of the original line, originally as Penrith Road. The following year it was renamed Kirkham Lane, before being again renamed Kirkham in 1938. The station itself consisted of a small wooden platform, and a wooden station building.

Kirkham station closed along with the rest of the Camden railway line on 1 January 1963, with the station set on fire during the final train service. After closure, the station was abandoned and eventually demolished.

The remains of the former railway crossing are still visible close to the station site, across the nearby Kirkham Lane. This is the only remnant of the station's existence.
