= Elderslie railway station, Sydney =

Former railway station in Sydney, Australia

Elderslie
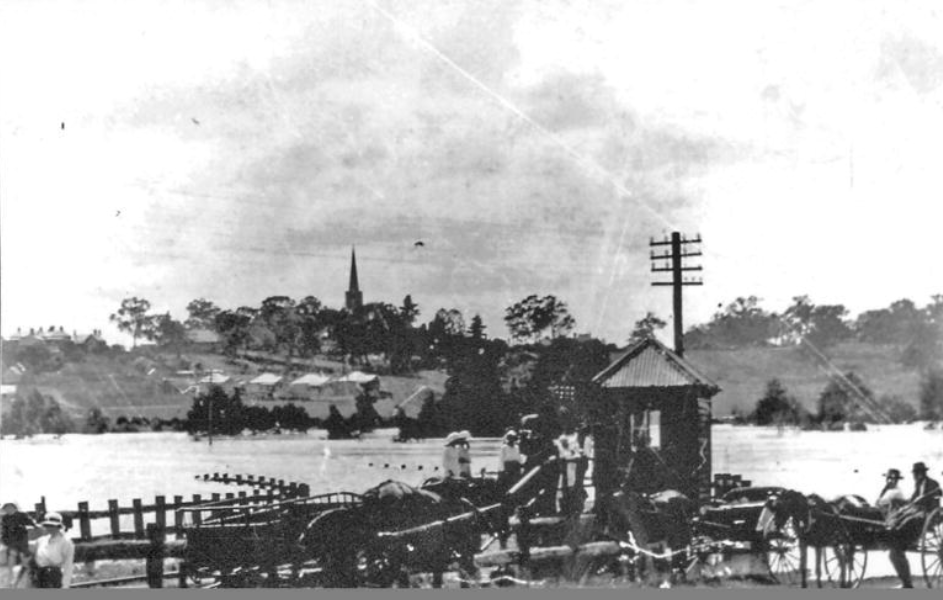
- Elderslie station in the foreground, surrounded by floodwaters in the early 1900s

General information
- Location: MacArthur Road, Elderslie, New South Wales; Australia
- Coordinates: 34°03′15″S 150°42′24″E
- Operator: Department of Railways
- Line: Camden
- Distance: 66.427 kilometres (41.276 mi) from Central
- Platforms: 1 (1 side)
- Tracks: 1

Construction
- Structure type: Ground

Other information
- Status: Demolished

History
- Opened: 1 October 1893
- Closed: 1 January 1963
- Former names: Carpenters Lane (1893-1894)

Services
Preceding station	Former services	Following station
Camden Terminus	Camden Line	Kirkham towards Campbelltown
Location

Elderslie railway station was a railway station on the Camden railway line, serving the suburb of Elderslie, New South Wales, Australia.

== History ==
The Camden line had originally opened in March 1882, although no station was provided at Elderslie at this time.

Elderslie opened in 1893 as Carpenters Lane, being renamed Elderslie on 1 June 1894. The station itself was almost identical to its neighbour Kirkham, consisting of a small wooden platform, and a wooden station building.

Throughout its existence, station services were weaker than that of others on the line. Lighting at the station was non-existent and this proved to be an issue, with the Camden Council making multiple requests for services to be upgraded on the platform. The platform itself was also considerably lower than the doors of the train carriages used, but requests for the platform to be raised were ignored.

Elderslie station closed to services with the rest of the Camden railway line on 1 January 1963. After closure, the station was abandoned and demolished. No remains of the station are extant.
