= Elderslie High School =

Location
- 48 Hilder Street, Narellan, Macarthur region, New South Wales; Australia; 34°03′11″S 150°42′55″E

Information
- Type: Government-funded co-educational comprehensive secondary day school
- Motto: Excellence, Honour, Service
- Established: January 1977; 49 years ago
- School district: Camden, Regional South
- Educational authority: New South Wales Department of Education
- Principal: Jennifer Lawrence
- Enrolment: 958 (2018)
- Colours: Brown and gold
- Website: elderslie-h.schools.nsw.gov.au

Elderslie High School is a government-funded co-educational comprehensive secondary day school, located in Narellan, a town in the Macarthur region, southwest of Sydney, New South Wales, Australia.

Established in 1977, the school provides education for approximately 950 students from Year 7 to Year 12. The school is operated by the New South Wales Department of Education; the principal is Jennifer Lawrence.

== Feeder schools ==
Elderslie's feeder primary schools are Mawarra Public School, Elderslie Public School, Camden Public School, Camden South Public School, Cobbitty Public School, Harrington Park Public School and Spring Farm Public School.

== See also ==
- List of government schools in New South Wales
- Education in Australia
