= Camden railway line =

Former railway line in Sydney, New South Wales, Australia

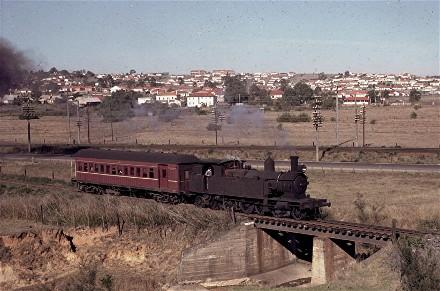
- The 'Camden Tram' approaches the first grade after departing from Campbelltown.

Overview
- Status: Demolished
- Termini: Campbelltown; Camden
- Stations: 9

Service
- Operator: Department of Railways

History
- Opened: 10 March 1882
- Closed: 1 January 1963

Technical
- Line length: 12.59 km (7.82 mi)
- Track gauge: 4 ft 8 1/2 in (1,435 mm)

The Camden railway line was a railway line between Campbelltown and Camden in the southwestern outskirts of Sydney, Australia. The passenger service was also known as the 'Camden Tram' and affectionately as 'Pansy'.

== History ==
The Camden railway line was designed as a light railway and construction of the line started in 1881. The line opened on 10 March 1882 and ran between Campbelltown and Camden. The line was originally operated with Baldwin Steam Tram Motors, but these proved unsatisfactory. The NSWGR purchased two small 0-6-0 saddle tank locomotives from Manning Wardle, which were a standard K Class design. These became the S-292 class. The line carried freight and passengers but was rarely busy. From 1901, the line was upgraded to railway standard and typically operated by an E class (later Z20 class locomotive in the 1924 reclassification of locomotives) 2-6-4 side-tank locomotives. Starting in the 1950s, the usual locomotive power on the Camden Branch Line was provided by C30 class locomotives. Passenger trains in the early years used lightweight KA Tramcars which were specially built for the line, but were also used at Yass and Carlingford. Starting around 1917 the trains typically ran with a CCA type end-platform carriage, usually boosted in capacity by various independent carriages when the occasion demanded.

Due to the steepness of the ruling gradient of 1 in 19 (reported to be the steepest grade used by adhesion locomotives in Australia) between Campbelltown and Kenny Hill, there were often multiple attempts made at ascending the grade. Passengers would sometimes have to disembark from the train and walk alongside it, leaving their bags on board. When trains could not successfully ascend the hill, the train would be divided and the second half of train (invariably the part where the passengers were carried) would be left standing on the line until the first half of the train had been stowed at Campbelltown. Such delays on the line were a source of annoyance and inconvenience for passengers. The main source of income for the line was the coal loader at Narellan and the Dairy Farmers Milk Co-operative depot at Camden. The line closed on 1 January 1963.

Traces of the original line's route can still be seen along looking up Kirkham Lane from Camden Valley Way, including a wooden bridge along this section towards Narellan. The elevated section as it passed through this low-lying area are visible – the nearby Nepean River would flood the land around this area when it burst its banks. Cuttings through Kenny Hill are also visible from parts of Narellan Road near the Mount Annan Botanical Gardens. Photographs of the line are on display in the Camden Historic Society Museum in Camden.

The song 'The Camden Tram' by Buddy Williams, which is featured in the repertoire of the Camden Community Band, commemorates the train.

== Stations and route ==
Name	Distance from Central	Opened	Closed	Railway line	Suburbs served	Other lines
Campbelltown	54.71 km	1858	-	Main Suburban	Campbelltown, Blair Athol	Airport & South Line Southern Highlands Line
Maryfields	57.60 km	1936	1963	Camden	Campbelltown	
Kenny Hill	58.95 km	1882	1963	Camden	Currans Hill	
Currans Hill	61.33 km	1882	1963	Camden	Currans Hill	
Narellan	63.10 km	1882	1963	Camden	Narellan	
Grahams Hill	63.71 km	1882	1963	Camden	Narellan	
Kirkham	65.14 km	1882	1963	Camden	Kirkham	
Elderslie	66.43 km	1893	1963	Camden	Elderslie	
Camden	67.30 km	1882	1963	Camden	Camden	

== Special working ==
Every year, on Good Friday, three or four special trains were run from Sydney to Maryfields, to cater for public attendance to the Via Crucis religious ceremony held on the grounds of the Franciscan Brothers monastery near Campbelltown. This required out-of-the-ordinary working over the branch line, which also included the provision of an additional locomotive at both the front and rear of each train. The station at Maryfields had a platform suitable for an 8 or 9-car train and was located opposite the entrance to the monastery.

== See also ==
- Railways in Sydney
- Steepest gradients
