= Maryfields railway station =

Former railway station in Sydney, Australia

Maryfields
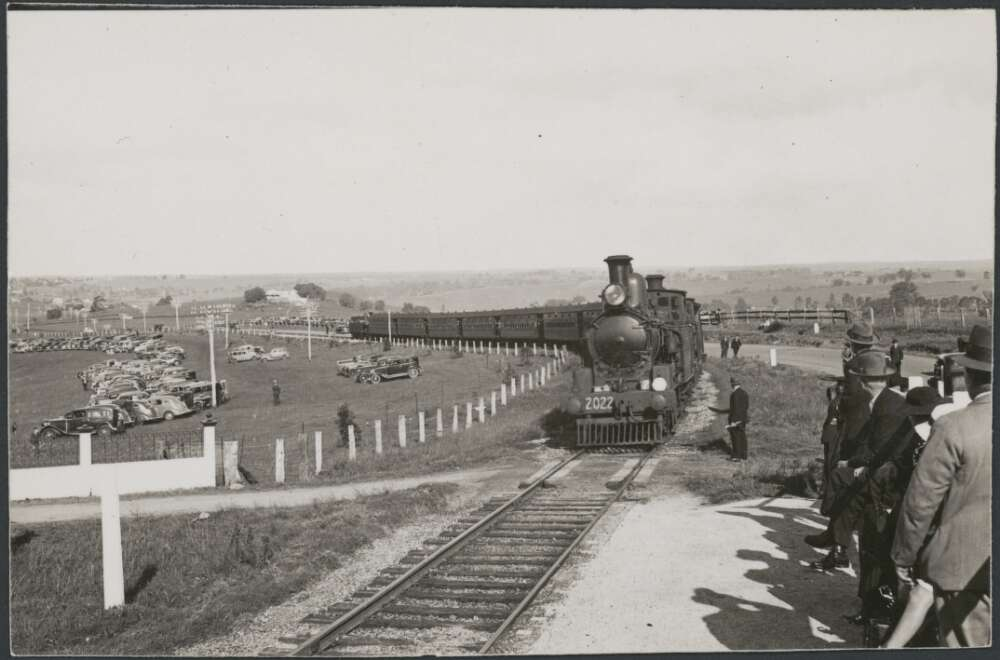
- Maryfields Special arriving at the station in April 1939

General information
- Location: Campbelltown, New South Wales; Australia
- Coordinates: 34°03′53″S 150°47′31″E
- Operator: Department of Railways
- Line: Camden
- Distance: 57.602 kilometres (35.792 mi) from Central
- Platforms: 1 (1 side)
- Tracks: 1

Construction
- Structure type: Ground

Other information
- Status: Demolished

History
- Opened: 1883
- Closed: 1 January 1963
- Rebuilt: 1937
- Former names: Rudds Gate (1883-1938)

Services
Preceding station	Former services	Following station
Kenny Hill towards Camden	Camden Line	Campbelltown Terminus
Location

Maryfields railway station was a railway station on the Camden railway line, serving the area of Maryfields in Campbelltown, New South Wales, Australia.

== History ==
Maryfields opened in 1883 as Rudds Gate before being renamed Maryfields in 1938, and was the last infill station on the Camden railway line, which had originally opened in 1882.

Although originally opened as a small platform, the popularity of the station necessitated better facilities. In 1937 the Department of Railways reconstructed the station as a 150 m platform to accommodate large crowds.

The station had at one point during its existence, enjoyed six return trips each day, but the growing popularity of personal vehicles, and the negative perceptions of the efficiency of the railway line led to the ceasing of services between Campbelltown and Camden on 1 January 1963, resulting in the closure of Maryfields. Only minor formations now remain at the station site.

== Maryfields Special ==
Throughout the entirety of the station's existence, Maryfields was serviced by a special Good Friday train that terminated at the station. This was due to an annual Via Crucis ceremony at the nearby Franciscan Brothers Monastery. From the year of the opening, these services proved popular with 30,000 people in attendance in 1936. Police controlled traffic in and out of the station, with NRMA and St John Ambulance providing extra aid. The continued popularity of the Good Friday service ensure the continued popularity of the station as well.
