= Wakakirri =

Wakakirri is an Australian national Story-Dance festival for primary and Secondary schools that has been running since 1992. Wakakirri is a word from the Aboriginal Wangaaypuwan people meaning "to dance". The name was chosen at the inception of the event in 1992 to give it a uniquely Australian context and feeling.

== Past Categories ==
- Story Singing
- Story Telling
- Story Writing
- Story Arts
- Story Boarding

== Signature Item ==
- 2006 - Key
- 2007 - Ring
- 2008 - Tap
- 2009 - Spring
- 2010 - Duck
- 2011 - Bug
- 2012 - Twelve
- 2013 - Cake
- 2014 - Sun
- 2015 - Chicken
- 2016 - Star
- 2017 - Gift
- 2018 - Fly
- 2019 - Sloth
- 2020 - Dragon
- 2021 - Monkey
- 2022 - Rise

== Past Primary Challenge Winners ==
- 1999 - 'Unknown' Hackham East Primary School
- 2001 - 'Bulli Mine Distaster' St Joseph's Primary School Bulli
- 2000 - 'Charlotte's Web' Moreton Downs State Primary School
- 2003 - 'Reality' Lyneham Primary School
- 2006 - 'When The Going Gets Tough' Edwardstown Primary School
- 2007 - 'Our Only Home' Altona North Primary School
- 2008 - 'Four Walls, Free Spirit' Holy Spirit Primary School
- 2009 - Queanbeyan West Public School
- 2010 - Beechboro Primary School
- 2011 - 'True Inspiration' Dapto Public School
- 2012 - 'The Last Dance' Pearcedale Primary School
- 2013 - 'Such is Life - Ned Kelly' Torrens Primary School
- 2014 - 'The Window Within' Aberfoyle Hub School
- 2015 - 'Fantastic Mr Fox' Rosary Primary School
- 2016 - 'Be Inspired' Dapto Public School
- 2017 - 'Turning Heads, Making Waves' Chapel Hill State School
- 2018 - 'We’ve Got The Power' Mango Hill State School
- 2019 - 'Jack And The Giants' Berwick Primary School
- 2020 - 'Through The Smoke' Whitefriars Primary School

== Past Secondary Challenge Winners ==
- 2006 - 'Drawing The Line' St Patrick's College, Launceston
- 2007 - 'A Fence, Our Journey, An Identity' Engadine High School
- 2008 - 'An Eternity Imprisoned' Engadine High School
- 2013 - 'Turning Tides' Our Lady Of The Sacred Heart College
- 2014 - 'Idol 2.0' East Hills Boys High School
- 2015 - 'One Of Us' Rosebud Secondary College
- 2016 - 'The Leap' Northmead Creative & Performing Arts HS
- 2017 - 'The Greatest Gift You Can Give' Mount Annan Christian College
- 2018 - 'The Rabbits' Tuggerah Lakes Secondary College
- 2019 - 'Be Carful What You Whisper’ Hoppers Crossing Secondary College
- 2020 - 'A Life Lived In Fear Is A Life Half-Lived' Daramalan College
