= Elizabeth Macarthur High School =

Secondary school in Sydney, New South Wales

Location
- Waterworth Drive, Narellan Vale, South Western Sydney, New South Wales; 34°03′27″S 150°44′24″E

Information
- Type: Government-funded co-educational dual modality partially academically selective and comprehensive secondary day school
- Motto: Respect, Responsibility, Pride
- Established: 1988; 38 years ago
- School district: Macarthur; Regional South, New South Wales
- Educational authority: New South Wales Department of Education
- Principal: Kylie Hedger
- Years: 7–12
- Enrolment: 1,363 (2023)
- Colours: Navy blue, white and red
- Website: elizabeth-h.schools.nsw.gov.au

Elizabeth Macarthur High School (abbreviated as EMHS) is a government-funded co-educational dual modality partially academically selective and comprehensive secondary day school, located in Narellan Vale, an outer south-western suburb of Sydney, New South Wales, Australia.

Named in honour of Elizabeth Macarthur, wife of John Macarthur, both Australian agricultural pioneers, the school was established in 1988 and caters for approximately 1,300 students from Year 7 to Year 12, including approximately 70 indigenous students.

The school provides agriculture as a school subject. The school has an established performance in livestock shows, such as the Camden Show and the Royal Easter Show.

On 21 June 2019, the school was evacuated due to an unspecified police operation. It was discovered that the reason for the evacuation was a bomb threat. An additional bomb threat was called in on 28 October 2020 in an attempt to delay the scheduled Higher School Certificate examinations.

== See also ==
- List of government schools in New South Wales
- List of selective high schools in New South Wales
- Selective school (New South Wales)
