= Camden, New South Wales =

Camden
- Town
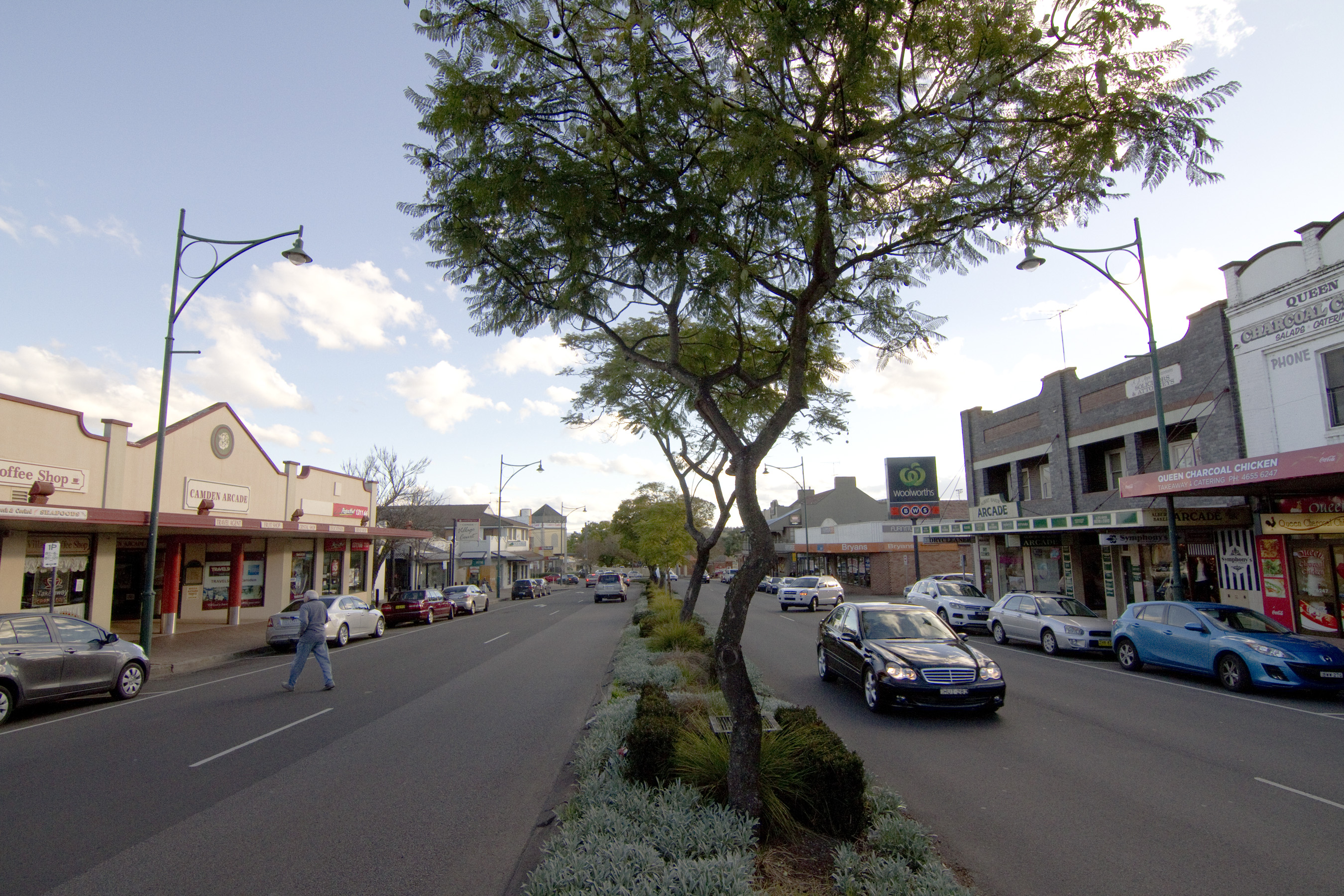
- Argyle Street, Camden

- Interactive map of Camden
- Country: Australia
- State: New South Wales
- Region: Macarthur
- City: Sydney
- LGA: Camden Council
- Location: 70 km (43 mi) south-west of Sydney CBD; 16 km (9.9 mi) W of Campbelltown; 19 km (12 mi) SE of Picton
- Established: 1840

Government
  - State electorate: Camden
  - Federal division: Hume
- Elevation: 77 m (253 ft)

Population
  - Total: 3,378 (SAL 2021)
- Postcode: 2570
Localities around Camden
Ellis Lane	Cobbitty	Kirkham
Grasmere	Camden	Elderslie
Cawdor	Camden South	Spring Farm

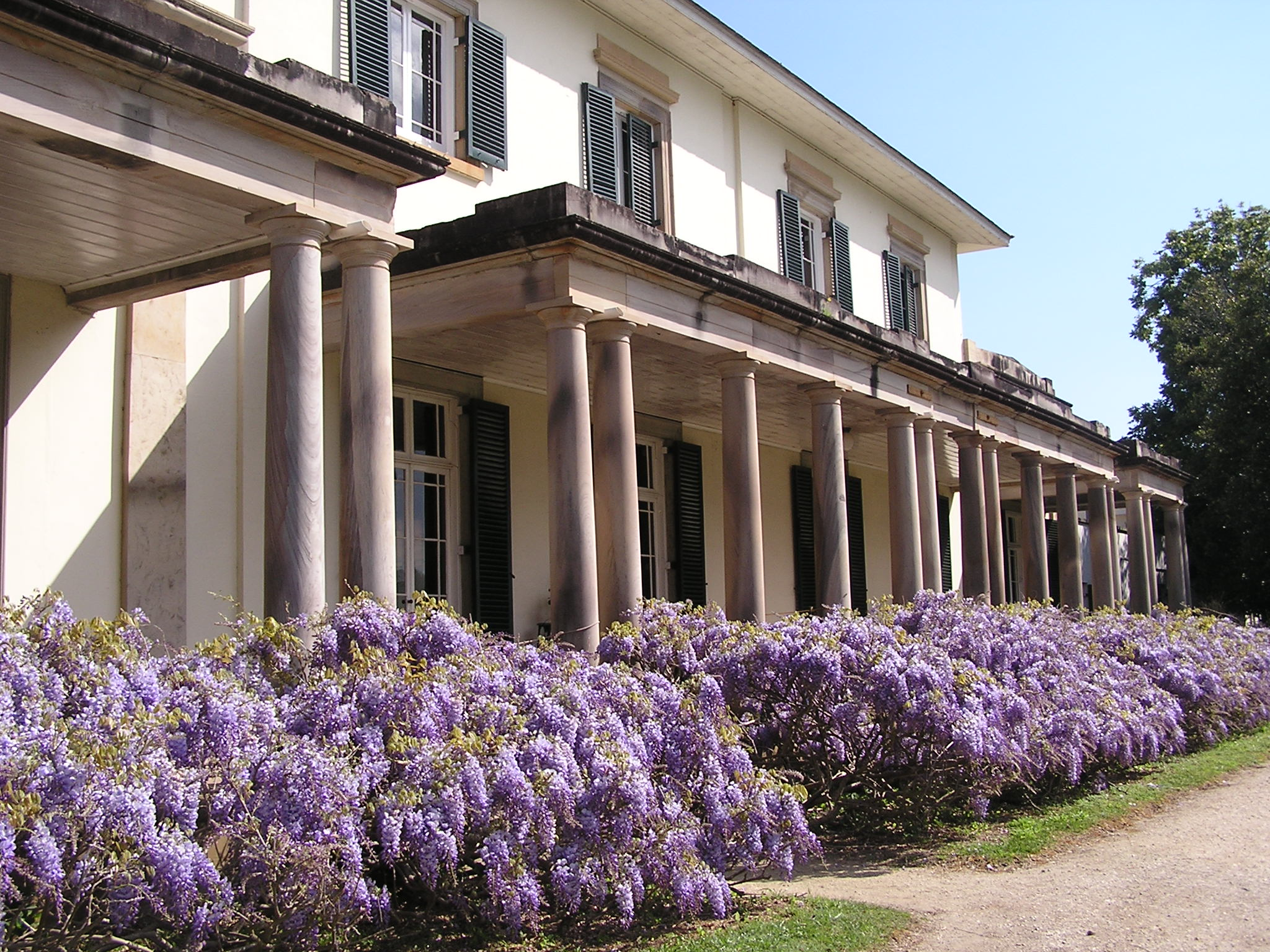
House designed by John Verge at Camden Park – built between 1832 and 1835 for John Macarthur

Camden is a historic town and suburb of Sydney, New South Wales, located 65 kilometres south-west of the Sydney central business district. Camden was the administrative centre for the local government area of Camden Council until July 2016 and is a part of the Macarthur region.

== History ==
=== Indigenous people ===
The area now known as Camden was originally at the northern edge of land belonging to the Gandangara people of the Southern Highlands, who called it Benkennie, meaning 'dry land'. North of the Nepean River were the Muringong, the southernmost of the Darug people, while to the east were the Tharawal people. They lived in extended family groups of 20–40 members, hunting kangaroos, possums and eels and gathering yams and other seasonal fruit and vegetables from the local area. They were described as 'short, stocky, strong and superbly built' and generally considered peaceful. However, as British settlers encroached on their land and reduced their food sources, they turned to armed resistance which ended in 1816 after many of their number were massacred.

=== European settlement ===
Explorers first visited the area in 1795 and named it 'Cowpastures' after a herd of cattle that had disappeared was discovered there. In February 1805, Governor King instructed (apparently reluctantly) a surveyor to measure 5,000 acres (2,000 ha) for John Macarthur at Cowpastures, where Macarthur had been promised land by the Secretary of State for War and the Colonies, Lord Camden. Macarthur named his property Camden Park in honour of his sponsor.

As Macarthur's wool industry thrived, local citizens began pushing for the establishment of a town in the area to support the industry. Surveyor-General Major Thomas Mitchell suggested Macarthur surrender 320 acres (130 ha) of his land for the purpose to which he refused. Following his death in 1834, his children decided to subdivide the land and the first lots in the new town of Camden went on sale in 1840. Camden Post Office opened on 1 May 1841, the day after the nearby Elderslie office (open from 1839) closed. By 1883, the population had grown to over 300 and a movement began to establish a local council which held its first meeting in 1889.

== Heritage listings ==
Commonwealth Heritage List places:

- Camden Post Office, 135 Argyle Street

NSW State Heritage Register listed places:

- Camden Park House and Garden, Elizabeth Macarthur Avenue
- Camden Park Estate and Belgenny Farm, Elizabeth Macarthur Avenue
- Macquarie Grove, Aerodrome Road
- Nant Gwylan and Garden, Exeter Street
- St Johns Anglican Church Precinct, incorporating St John's Anglican Church, 6–22 Menangle Road

== Transport ==
Between 1882 and 1963, Camden station connected Camden to Campbelltown and Sydney by the Camden railway line. Camden is served by Camden Airport, which is mostly used by trainee pilots for flying schools, the Australian Air League, and other forms of general aviation.

== Climate ==
Camden has a humid subtropical climate (Köppen climate classification: Cfa) with warm, humid summers and cool to cold winters–it is significantly colder than central Sydney in winter.

Climate data for Camden Airport (1991–2020 averages)
Month	Jan	Feb	Mar	Apr	May	Jun	Jul	Aug	Sep	Oct	Nov	Dec	Year
Record high °C (°F)	46.4 (115.5)	45.6 (114.1)	41.0 (105.8)	38.5 (101.3)	29.5 (85.1)	24.9 (76.8)	27.0 (80.6)	30.2 (86.4)	36.5 (97.7)	40.5 (104.9)	42.6 (108.7)	44.0 (111.2)	46.4 (115.5)
Mean daily maximum °C (°F)	29.7 (85.5)	28.7 (83.7)	26.9 (80.4)	24.0 (75.2)	20.6 (69.1)	17.8 (64.0)	17.4 (63.3)	19.2 (66.6)	22.2 (72.0)	24.5 (76.1)	26.4 (79.5)	28.7 (83.7)	23.8 (74.8)
Mean daily minimum °C (°F)	17.0 (62.6)	16.9 (62.4)	15.0 (59.0)	11.1 (52.0)	7.0 (44.6)	4.5 (40.1)	3.1 (37.6)	4.1 (39.4)	6.8 (44.2)	10.1 (50.2)	13.0 (55.4)	15.3 (59.5)	10.3 (50.5)
Record low °C (°F)	7.9 (46.2)	7.2 (45.0)	5.9 (42.6)	−0.7 (30.7)	−2.2 (28.0)	−5.4 (22.3)	−6.0 (21.2)	−4.0 (24.8)	−1.8 (28.8)	1.3 (34.3)	3.8 (38.8)	5.7 (42.3)	−6.0 (21.2)
Average precipitation mm (inches)	71.8 (2.83)	108.4 (4.27)	80.6 (3.17)	48.6 (1.91)	31.7 (1.25)	77.1 (3.04)	33.8 (1.33)	33.8 (1.33)	32.7 (1.29)	50.0 (1.97)	69.9 (2.75)	66.4 (2.61)	698.9 (27.52)
Average precipitation days (≥ 0.2 mm)	10.8	11.0	11.5	9.3	7.2	10.3	9.0	7.3	7.8	8.4	10.0	10.2	112.8
Average afternoon relative humidity (%)	48	53	51	50	50	53	51	41	42	44	49	45	48

== Education ==
Camden is the location of research facilities for the veterinary and agricultural schools of the University of Sydney. The local government area has four public high schools, Mount Annan High School, Camden High School, Elderslie High School and Elizabeth Macarthur High School, as well as eight Catholic and three Anglican schools.

== Culture ==
The Camden Show is an annual event which combines amusement park attractions with the elements of a state fair. Camden is served by three local radio stations, 2MCR, Vintage FM and C91.3FM. Sydney radio station Gold 101.7 also serves Camden via a translator on 88.3 FM. Local newspapers are the Camden Advertiser, the District Reporter and the Macarthur Chronicle.

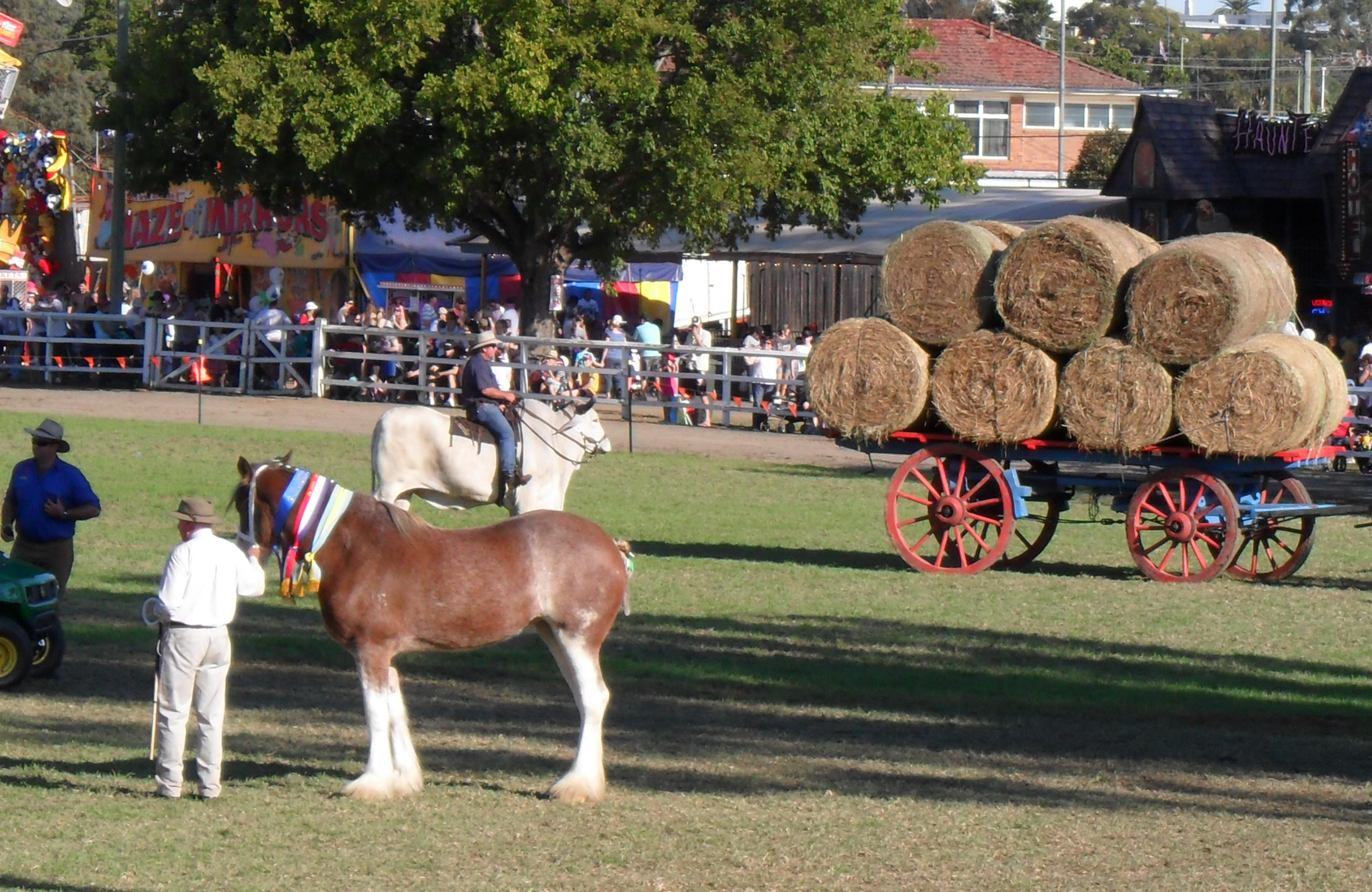
Camden Show 2011, main arena.

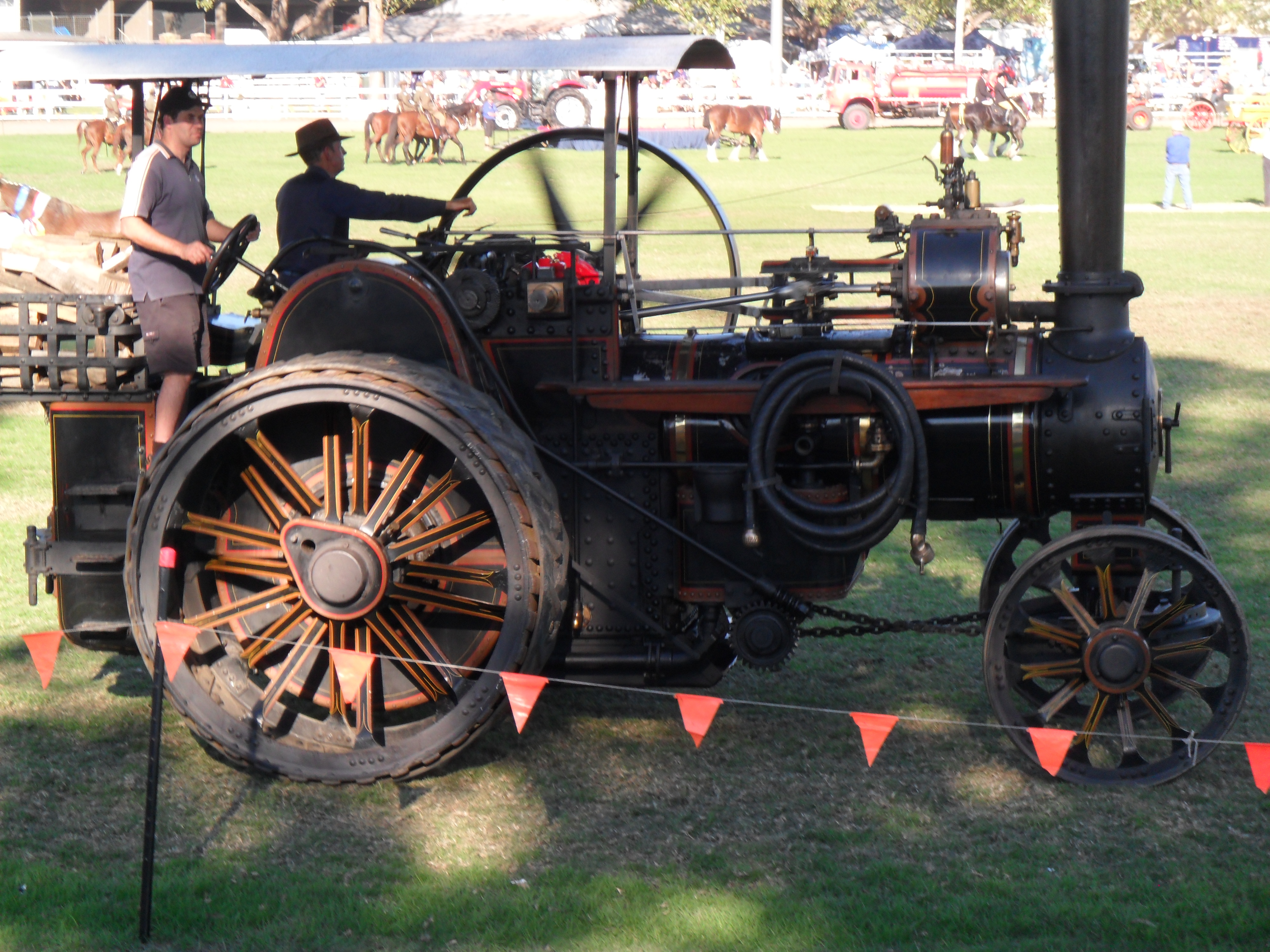
Traction engine, Camden Show

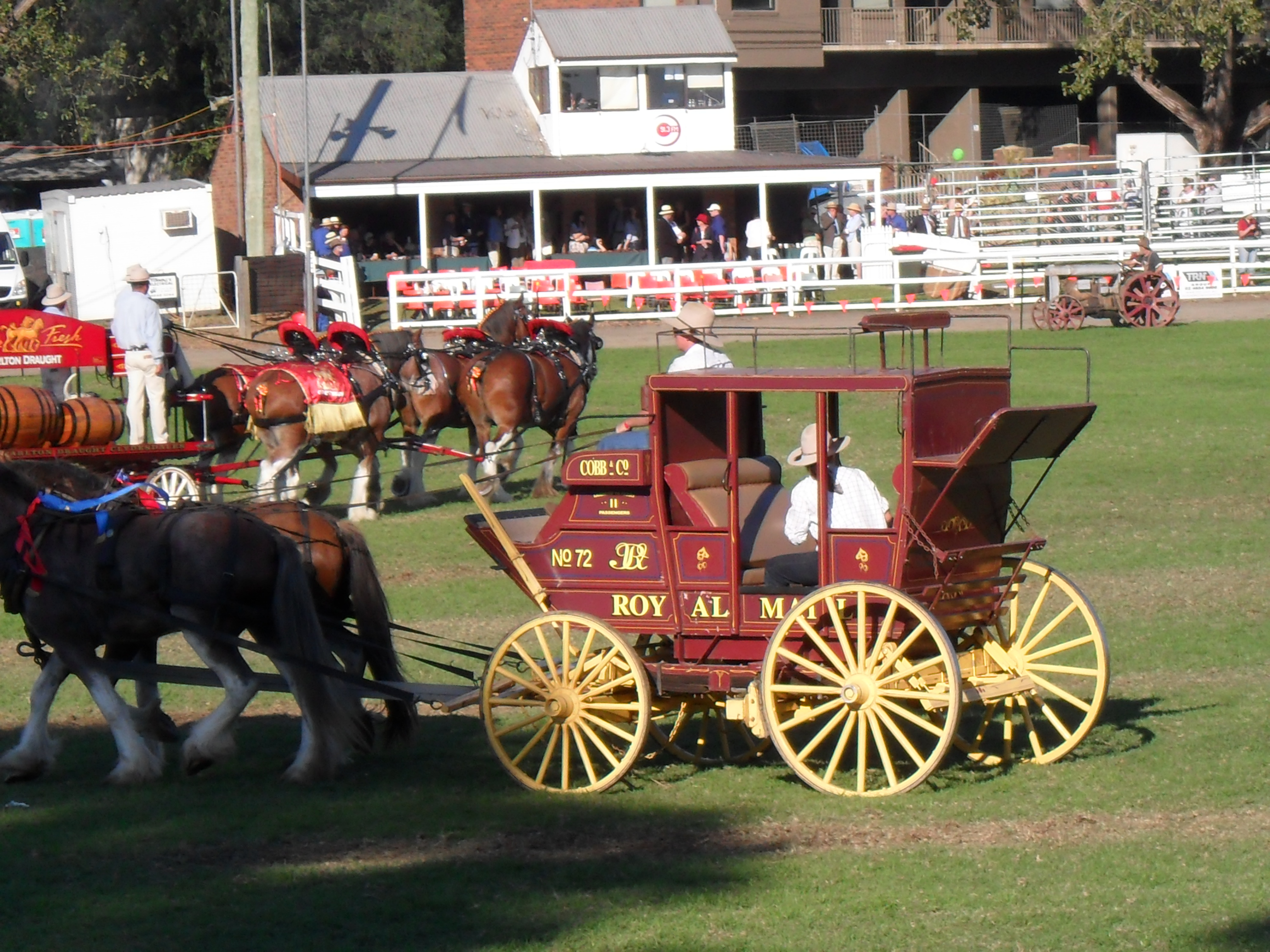
Camden Show 2011, Cobb & Co. coach

== People ==
=== Demographics ===
According to the 2021 census, there were 3,378 residents in Camden. In Camden, 80.3% of people were born in Australia; the most next common countries of birth included England 4.5%, New Zealand 1.2%, Scotland 0.8%, South Africa 0.5% and Germany 0.5%. 88.8% of people only spoke English at home; other languages spoken at home included Italian 0.6%, Spanish 0.5%, German 0.4%, Croatian 0.4% and Arabic 0.4%. The most common responses for religion in Camden included Catholic 30.3%, No Religion 28.0%, Anglican 21.3%, and Uniting Church 2.5%; a further 6.5% of respondents elected not to disclose their religion.

== Politics ==
Camden lies within the local government area of Camden Council. The council consists of nine councillors; three for each of the three wards; North Ward (consisting of Bringelly, Rossmore, Leppington, Cobbitty, Oran Park, Catherine Field and Harrington Park), Central Ward (consisting of Gledswood Hills, Gregory Hills, Smeaton Grange, Currans Hill, Narellan Vale and Mount Annan) and South Ward (consisting of Ellis Lane, Narellan, Grasmere, Camden, Elderslie, Spring Farm, Bickley Vale, Cawdor and Camden South). Lara Symkowiak was elected mayor in 2012.

The southern part of the Camden LGA including Camden town centre is contained within the federal electorate of Hume while the northern end of the LGA (north of Narellan Road) is within the federal electorate of Macarthur. The state seat of Camden covers all of the Camden LGA.

The state member for Camden is Sally Quinnell, first elected in 2023, representing the Australian Labor Party. The federal member for Macarthur is Mike Freelander, first elected in 2016 and the federal member for Hume is Angus Taylor, first elected in 2013. Taylor is a member of the Liberal Party of Australia while Freelander is a member of the Australian Labor Party.

=== Planning issues ===
On 27 May 2008 Camden Council rejected plans from the Quranic Society to build a 1,200-student Islamic school in the nearby suburb of Cawdor on planning grounds. The site was 2.5 kilometres (1.6 mi) south of the centre of Camden adjacent to the Camden General Cemetery and 800 metres (2,600 ft) north of the then recently relocated Camden High School. The issue received national and international media coverage. The proposal was opposed from within the local community, many expressing fear and hatred about the presence of Muslims in an area where relatively few Muslims live. There were angry comments by a number of residents in Camden that were viewed as racist and Islamophobic. The Christian Democratic Party (CDP) opposed the proposal. Speaking at a public meeting in December 2007, CDP leader Fred Nile (present alongside Robert Balzola) said he opposed the school "because Islam opposed Christianity". A spokesman for the Quranic Society said it was "absurd" to claim that Muslims are anti-Christian.

In making its decision several council members, including Mayor Chris Patterson, said the school was inappropriate for the semi-rural area of Camden and likely to cause parking, traffic and other problems. Australian Prime Minister Kevin Rudd indicated before the council decision that he wouldn't support the school on planning grounds. The Quranic Society said it will appeal the council's decision in the Land and Environment Court of New South Wales.

In September 2008, a proposal to build a private Catholic school received media attention for not provoking the same sort of outcry as the previous proposal. Some residents who were not supportive of the Islamic school now welcomed the Catholic school proposal.

On 2 June 2009, The Land and Environment Court passed down the decision to reject the appeal by the Quranic Society, with the court stating that the "development application was not suitable for the rural nature of the land."

However, on 17 May 2021, it was announced that A-League team Macarthur FC had acquired 17 hectares (42 acres) of the planning grounds to construct a football precinct to house the team's future W-League squad, as well as the National Premier Leagues NSW squads.

== Notable residents ==
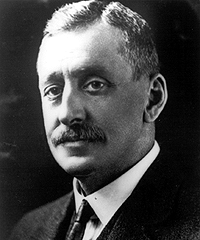
James William Macarthur-Onslow

- Senna Agius (born 2005), motorcycle racer
- Jason Behrendorff, cricketer
- Steven Bradbury, short track speed skater who won Australia's first Winter Olympics gold medal
- Professor Graeme Clark, inventor of the Bionic Ear
- James Francis Dwyer (1874–1952), author
- Chloe Esposito, modern pentathlon competitor who won the gold medal in the 2016 Rio Olympics
- Amy Harrison, association football player (Sydney FC and Washington Spirit)
- Daniel Heckenberg, rugby league player
- Rob Hirst, drummer with the band Midnight Oil
- John Macarthur, father of the Australian wool industry
- Francis Arthur Macarthur-Onslow (1875–1938), grazier and businessman
- James William Macarthur-Onslow (1867–1946), soldier, grazier and politician
- Dustin Martin, Australian rules footballer (Richmond)
- Hugh McCrae, Australian poet, biographer, illustrator
- Mat Mladin, world motorcycle champion
- Elizabeth Ralston, association football player at Sydney FC
- Garry Rush, racing driver
