= Camden High School (New South Wales) =

Location
- Camden, Macarthur, New South Wales; Australia; 34°4′46″S 150°40′33″E

Information
- Type: Government-funded co-educational comprehensive secondary day school
- Motto: Together We Achieve
- Established: 1956; 70 years ago
- School district: Camden
- Educational authority: New South Wales Department of Education
- Principal: Karen Wood
- Teaching staff: 47.8 FTE (2018)
- Years: 7–12
- Enrolment: 1,071
- Area: 6.5 hectares (16 acres)
- Campus type: Outer suburban / Regional
- Colours: Navy, light blue and yellow
- Website: camden-h.schools.nsw.gov.au

Camden High School is a government-funded co-educational comprehensive secondary day school, located in the town of Camden, in the Macarthur region of New South Wales, Australia.

Established in 1956, the school catered for approximately 1,100 students, from Year 7 to Year 12, of whom five percent identified as Indigenous Australians and ten percent were from a language background other than English. The school is operated by the NSW Department of Education.

== Location ==
The school was originally situated on John and Exeter Streets within the town of Camden itself. This site was previously a gasworks and after industrial contamination was discovered at the school in 1995, including BTEX, PAH, cyanides and sulphates, it was closed down. The property was completely fenced off pending remediation. An unknown number of former students who attended the original site became ill. Marsdens solicitors in Camden commenced preparation of a class action against the Department of Education. On 23 July 2013 the ABC TV 7.30 Report aired details of an investigate report into the matter.

Construction of the new high school was completed in 2001, with students and staff making use of the new facilities from the end of that year. The new school is set on 6.5 hectares (16 acres) with views of the Razorback Range as a backdrop.

== See also ==
- List of government schools in New South Wales: A–F
- Education in Australia
