= Smeaton Grange =

- Suburb
- Interactive map of Smeaton Grange
- Coordinates: 34°2′6″S 150°45′25″E
- Country: Australia
- State: New South Wales
- City: Sydney
- LGA: Camden Council
- Location: 60 km (37 mi) from Sydney CBD

Government
  - State electorate: Camden
  - Federal division: Macarthur
- Elevation: 80 m (260 ft)

Population
  - Total: 16 (2021 census)
- Postcode: 2567
Suburbs around Smeaton Grange
| Harrington Park | Currans Hill | Currans Hill |
| Harrington Park | Smeaton Grange | Currans Hill |
| Narellan | Narellan Vale | Mount Annan |

Smeaton Grange is an industrial suburb of Sydney, in the state of New South Wales, Australia. It is located in the Camden Council local government area. The suburb mainly consists of industrial buildings and warehouses.

== History ==
The area now known as Smeaton Grange was originally home to the Muringong, southernmost of the Darug people. In 1805 John Macarthur established his property at Camden where he raised merino sheep.

During World War II, there was a temporary army encampment at Smeaton Grange.

In July 2017, the global retailer Amazon purchased a 2.11ha site in Smeaton Grange for $7 million which is used as a data centre for Amazon Web Services.

== Education ==
There is one local school, Magdalene Catholic High School (MCHS), which was built in 2000 and is located on Smeaton Grange Road.

== Governance ==
Smeaton Grange is part of the north ward of Camden Council represented by Lara Symkowiak (currently mayor), David Bligh and Peter Sidgreaves. The suburb is contained within the federal electorate of Macarthur, represented by Russell Matheson (Liberal), and the state electorate of Camden, currently held by Chris Patterson (Liberal).
