= Mount Annan =

- Suburb
- Interactive map of Mount Annan
- Country: Australia
- State: New South Wales
- Region: Macarthur
- City: Sydney
- LGAs: Camden Council; Campbelltown City Council
- Location: 60 km (37 mi) south-west of Sydney CBD

Government
  - State electorates: Camden; Campbelltown
  - Federal divisions: Hume; Macarthur

Area
  - Total: 7.15 km^{2} (2.76 sq mi)
- Elevation: 88 m (289 ft)

Population
  - Total: 11,784 (2021 census)
  - Density: 1,648.1/km^{2} (4,269/sq mi)
- Postcode: 2567
Suburbs around Mount Annan
Smeaton Grange	Currans Hill	Blairmount
Narellan Vale	Mount Annan	Campbelltown
Spring Farm	Menangle Park	Glen Alpine

Mount Annan is a suburb of Sydney, in the state of New South Wales, Australia. Mount Annan is located 60 kilometres south-west of the Sydney central business district, in the local government areas of Camden Council and Campbelltown City Council, and is part of the Macarthur region. The Federal Electorates of Hume and Macarthur divide the Gardens.

== History ==
The area now known as Mount Annan was originally home to the Dharawal people, based in the Illawarra region, although the Western Sydney-based Darug people and the Southern Highlands-based Gandangara people were also known to have inhabited the greater Camden area. Very early relations with British settlers were cordial but as farmers started clearing and fencing the land, affecting food resources in the area, clashes between the groups arose until 1816 when a number of indigenous people were massacred and the remainder retreated from direct conflict with the settlers.

In 1805, wool pioneer John Macarthur was granted 5,000 acres (20 km^{2}) at Cowpastures (now Camden). After the land was cleared, it was used for farming for most of the next 200 years until Sydney's suburban sprawl reached the town of Camden and modern suburbs like Mount Annan were subdivided into housing blocks.

== Transport ==
Mount Annan is off the Hume Highway. It includes the locality formerly known as Glenlee and the former Glenlee Colliery loader, which served the former Burragorang Valley coal mines. A number of bus services operated by Transit Systems run through the suburb. The nearest railway station is Macarthur.

== Education ==
There are three local schools in the area. Mount Annan Public School was built in 1993 and is located on Stenhouse Drive. Mount Annan High School was built in 2003 and is located on Welling Drive. Mount Annan Christian College (MACC) which was built in 1999 and is located on Narellan Road.

== Sport ==
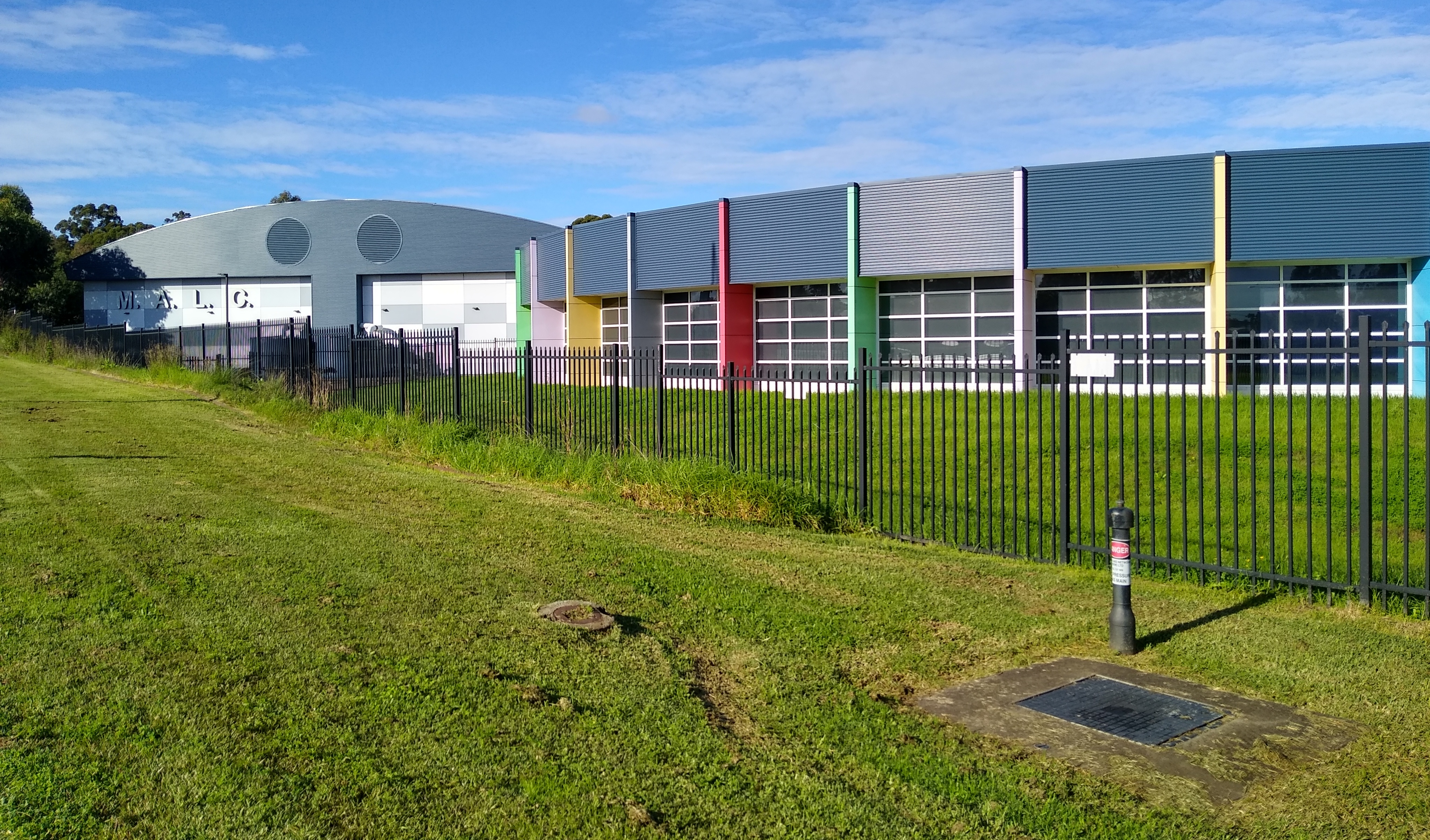
Mount Annan Leisure Centre

=== Netball ===
Mount Annan is home to one netball club, Mount Annan Netball Club, which was founded in 1993. MANC is affiliated with the Camden and District Netball Association. There are approximately 300 players a year across 30 teams.

=== Soccer ===
Mount Annan Mustangs is Mount Annan's local soccer club. The group was formed in 1999 by Alan Dudley.

=== Cricket ===
Mount Annan is a part of the Cobbitty-Narellan Cricket Club. It is hosted at the Birriwa Reserve.

=== Swimming ===
Mount Annan Swimming Club is hosted at Mount Annan Leisure Centre, which is owned by YMCA, which runs its swimming season from October through to August.

== Commercial area ==
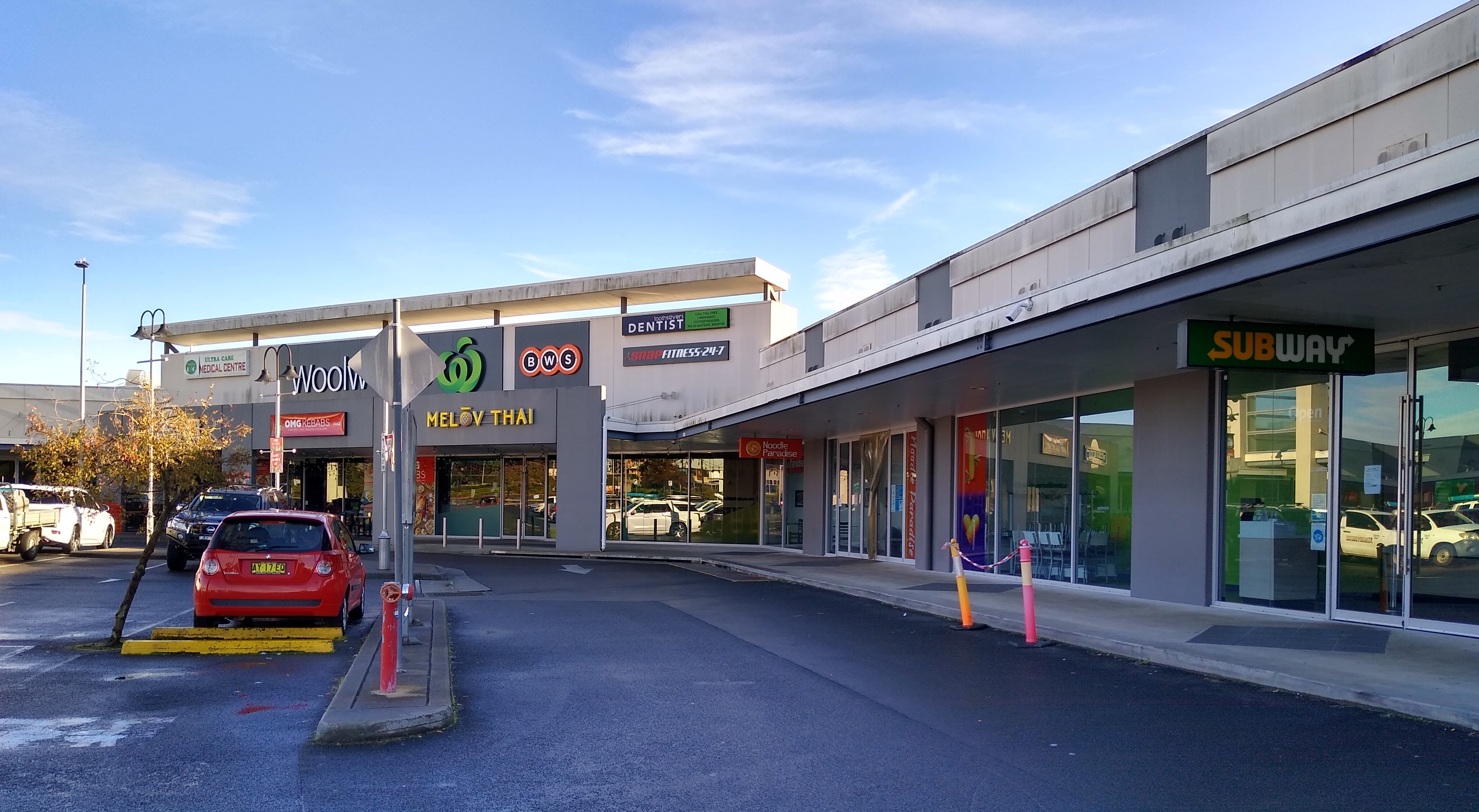
Mount Annan Marketplace

There are two notable shopping malls in the area, Mount Annan Marketplace and Mount Annan Central. There are also several restaurants in the area including Italian, Thai, Chinese, Japanese, American, and other cuisines.

== Churches ==
- C3 Church Mount Annan

== Landmarks ==
The Australian Botanic Garden Mount Annan is primarily a native garden but is equipped with barbecuing facilities and picnic areas. Mount Annan is a hill within the grounds and there is a track in the gardens to the summit. Sundial Hill is another landmark of the gardens and there is a water feature area. The gardens also includes a Stolen Generations Memorial.

== Demographics ==
In the 2021 census, the suburb of Mount Annan had a population of 11,784 people, with 58.0% of couple families having children. The suburb is almost entirely detached houses (96.2%) with 140 dwellings (3.9%) recorded as either apartments or townhouses. A high percentage of these houses are mortgaged (56.5%), higher than the national average (35.0%).

- Aboriginal and Torres Strait Islander people made up 3.4% of the population.
- 78.4% of people were born in Australia. The most common countries of birth were England 2.7%, New Zealand 1.5%, Philippines 1.2%, India 1.0% and Fiji 0.9%.
- 82.2% of people only spoke English at home. Other languages spoken at home included Arabic 1.6%, Spanish 1.6%, Hindi 1.0%, Mandarin 0.8% and Greek 0.7%.
- The most common responses for religion in Mount Annan were Catholic 30.2%, No Religion 29.6% and Anglican 15.8%.

== Local media ==
=== Newspapers ===
- Camden Advertiser – the local weekly newspaper based in Camden. It is owned by Fairfax Media.
- Macarthur Advertiser – the region's weekly newspaper based in Macarthur. It is owned by Fairfax Media.
- Macarthur Chronicle - one of the local newspapers, it is based in Campbelltown. The newspaper is owned by Newscorp.

=== Websites ===
- MountAnnan.net – local news and information

== Governance ==
Mount Annan lies in the central ward of Camden Council, currently represented by Rob Mills, Ashleigh Cagney and Theresa Fedeli. It sits within the state electorate of Camden, represented by Liberal Party of Australia's Chris Patterson, a former Mayor of Camden, and the federal electorate of Hume, represented by Liberal's Angus Taylor.

== Notable residents ==
- Dan O'Connor – actor
