= Mount Annan Christian College =

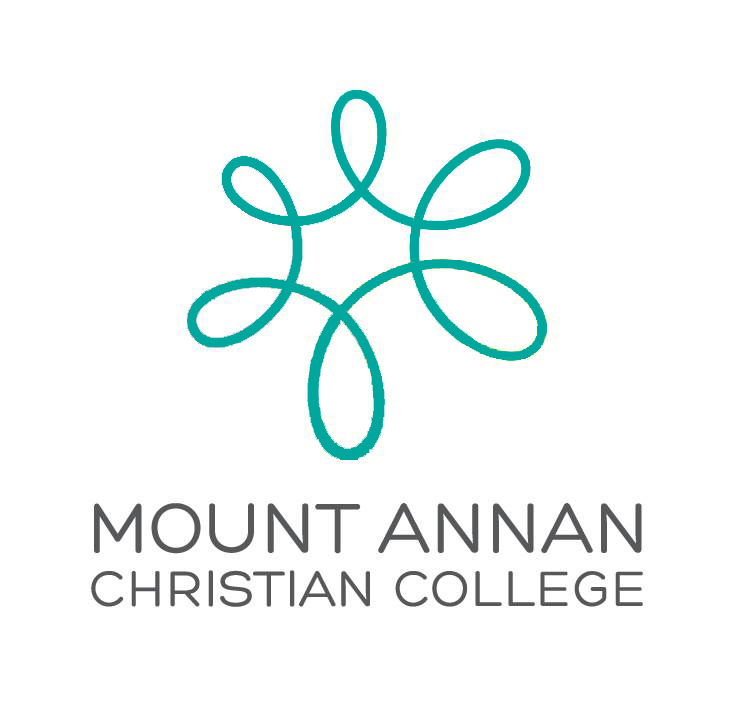

Location
- Narellan Road, Mount Annan, Macarthur, New South Wales; Australia; 34°02′52″S 150°46′40″E

Information
- Type: Independent co-educational early learning, primary and secondary day school
- Motto: Nurtured for life, Prepared for purpose
- Denomination: Non-denominational Christian
- Established: 1999; 27 years ago
- Chairman: Kenneth McLean
- Principal: Ian Liney
- Staff: 85
- Years: Early learning and K–12
- Enrolment: 1059 (2025)
- Campus type: Semi-rural
- Colours: Navy, Green and Yellow
- Affiliation: Association Independent Schools
- Website: https://macc.nsw.edu.au/

Mount Annan Christian College is an independent non-denominational Christian co-educational early learning, primary and secondary day school, located in Currans Hill, a suburb in the region of Macarthur, New South Wales, Australia.

Mount Annan Christian College was founded as a ministry of C3 New Hope on 12 February 1999 in order to establish a leading Prep to Year 12 school in the heart of the Macarthur region, New South Wales.

Mount Annan Christian College is a member of the Australian Independent Schools.

== Overview ==
The school consists of one large campus in the rural suburb of Mount Annan, and this campus facilitates the three sections of the school:

- Prep (preschool)
- Primary: Kindergarten to Year 6
- Secondary: Years 7 to 12

== Principals ==
The following individuals have served as Principal of Mount Annan Christian College:

Ordinal	Officeholder	Term start	Term end	Time in office
1	Wayne Parks	1999	2005	6 years
2	Nathan Gray	2005	2016	11 years
3	Gabi Korocz	2016	2025	10 years
4	Ian Liney	2026		

== Sport ==
College sport allows students to choose team sports that they are interested in, such as:

- Basketball
- Touch football
- Oztag
- Netball
- Volleyball
- Soccer
- cricket

== House system ==
Upon entry to the school, each student is allocated, according to age and gender, or family tradition, to one of the four Houses present on campus:

Nattai
Macquarie
Hawkesbury
Nepean

Houses form the basis for sporting and cultural competitions or interactions within the school.

Students can represent the College in a weekly inter-school competition in a variety of sports throughout the entire year. These competitions are a part of the Macarthur Independent Schools Association.

The Macarthur Independent Schools Association is an association made up of Christian based schools in the south west of Sydney. Through this association, high school students participate in a number of sporting competitions and cultural events.

== Student Leadership Council (SLC) ==
The school has a Student Leadership Council (SLC) spanning both primary and secondary. Primary and secondary each have 8 house captains, 8 prefects (four males, four females), 2 vice captains (one male, one female), and captains (one male, one female). The SLC have a range of responsibilities including; speaking at school events such as assemblies, organising school carnivals for Swimming, Cross Country and Athletics, and assisting in other events across the College. The SLC is an integral part of Mount Annan Christian College significantly contributing to student and school culture.

Role	Primary		Secondary	
Role	M	F	M	F
Captain	1	1	1	1
Vice Captain	1	1	1	1
Prefect	4	4	4	4
Sport Captains	1	1	1	1
House Captains	8		8	

== See also ==
- List of non-government schools in New South Wales
