= Mount Annan High School =

Secondary school in Sydney, New South Wales

Location
- Welling Drive, Mount Annan, South Western Sydney, New South Wales
- Coordinates: 34°03′27″S 150°45′40″E

Information
- Type: Government-funded co-educational dual modality partially academically selective and comprehensive secondary day school
- Motto: Be the best you can be
- Established: 2003; 23 years ago
- School district: Macarthur; Regional South, New South Wales
- Educational authority: New South Wales Department of Education
- Principal: Ken Bates
- Years: 7–12
- Enrolment: 890 (2024)
- Colours: Grey, white and green
- Website: mountannan-h.schools.nsw.gov.au

Mount Annan High School (abbreviated as MAHS) is a government-funded, co-educational, secondary school, located in the south-western Sydney suburb of Mount Annan, New South Wales, Australia. It is administered by the New South Wales Department of Education, with an enrolment of 890 students and a teaching staff of 72 as of 2024. The school serves students from Year 7 to Year 12 and was established in 2003.

== History ==
Construction began in 2000 and the school opened in January 2003 with 162 foundation students and 20 staff members.

=== Incidents ===
On 18 September 2019, emergency services were called to the school due to a fire in one of the science labs. In addition to the fire, a blunt object was used to damage 12 windows within the science block of the school. On account of the damage to the windows, it was later determined that the cause of the fire was deliberate. In a similar incident on 14 October 2019, a fire was started within the library causing approximately $2.5 million dollars ($AUS) in damages; it has since been refurbished. Two years later on 18 July 2021 an 18-year-old man was arrested who had allegedly started both fires as well as damaged school property, including 56 windows with a handsaw and crowbar.

In 2020 the school was one of twenty to receive a bomb threat.

== Demographics ==
In 2022 the school had a student enrolment of 881 students with 65 teachers (67.6 full-time equivalent) and 12 non-teaching staff (16.4 full-time equivalent). Female enrolments consisted of 441 students and Male enrolments consisted of 440 students; Indigenous enrolments accounted for a total of 7% and 34% of students had a language background other than English.

In 2023 the school had a student enrolment of 855 students with 62 teachers (65.6 full-time equivalent) and 12 non-teaching staff (15.9 full-time equivalent). Female enrolments consisted of 445 students and Male enrolments consisted of 410 students; Indigenous enrolments accounted for a total of 7% and 34% of students had a language background other than English.

In 2024 the school had a student enrolment of 890 students with 72 teachers (68.2 full-time equivalent) and 21 non-teaching staff (17.4 full-time equivalent). Female enrolments consisted of 457 students and Male enrolments consisted of 433 students; Indigenous enrolments accounted for a total of 7% and 32% of students had a language background other than English.

== Extra-curricular ==
For extra-curriculars, the school has a variety of clubs and a band. The clubs include an art club, Pokémon club, breakfast club, homework club, dance club, and a chess club.

== Notable staff ==
- Ebanie Bridges, professional boxer
- Benjamin Denmeade, actor

== See also ==
- List of government schools in New South Wales
- List of selective high schools in New South Wales
- Selective school (New South Wales)
