= Narellan Town Centre =

- Location: Narellan, New South Wales, Australia
- Coordinates: 34°02′23″S 150°44′12″E
- Address: 326 Camden Valley Way
- Opened: 1995
- Manager: Dart West Retail
- Num. of stores: 220
- Num. of anchor tenants: 7
- Floor area: 72,000 m^{2} (775,000 ft^{2})
- Floors: 2
- Parking: 3,000+
- Website: https://www.narellantowncentre.com.au/

Narellan Town Centre is a sub-regional shopping centre located in the suburb, Narellan, in the local government area of Camden Council and is part of the Macarthur region. The centre currently features over 220 stores including Big W, Kmart, Target, Woolworths, Coles, H&M, JB Hi-Fi and United Cinemas.

== History ==
The centre first opened in 1995 by Arnold Vitocco and Tony Perich, after being offered two hectare block of land in the middle of Narellan. It was originally anchored by a Woolworths supermarket with little over 20 speciality stores.

The first expansion in started 1999, adding Big W and 50 stores, and a further 20 stores in 2001.

In 2010, the centre had included cinema, food court and Coles supermarket, extending to 35,000 square metres.

In 2016, about 30 stores were opened in September, followed by a few restaurants in December.

In 2017, a $200 million redevelopment of the centre added a 38 metre pedestrian bridge over Camden Valley Way, connecting the old South area and the new North area, expanding the centre from 36,000 square metres to 72,000 square metres (total gross area of 132,810 square metres). The new Northern area added over 100 stores, 1500 new parking spaces, civic plazas and entertainment precincts, indoor/outdoor restaurants and casual dining precincts, banking precinct, as well as refurbishing the Coles supermarket, making it one of the largest Coles supermarket in Australia.

== Shopping and facilities ==
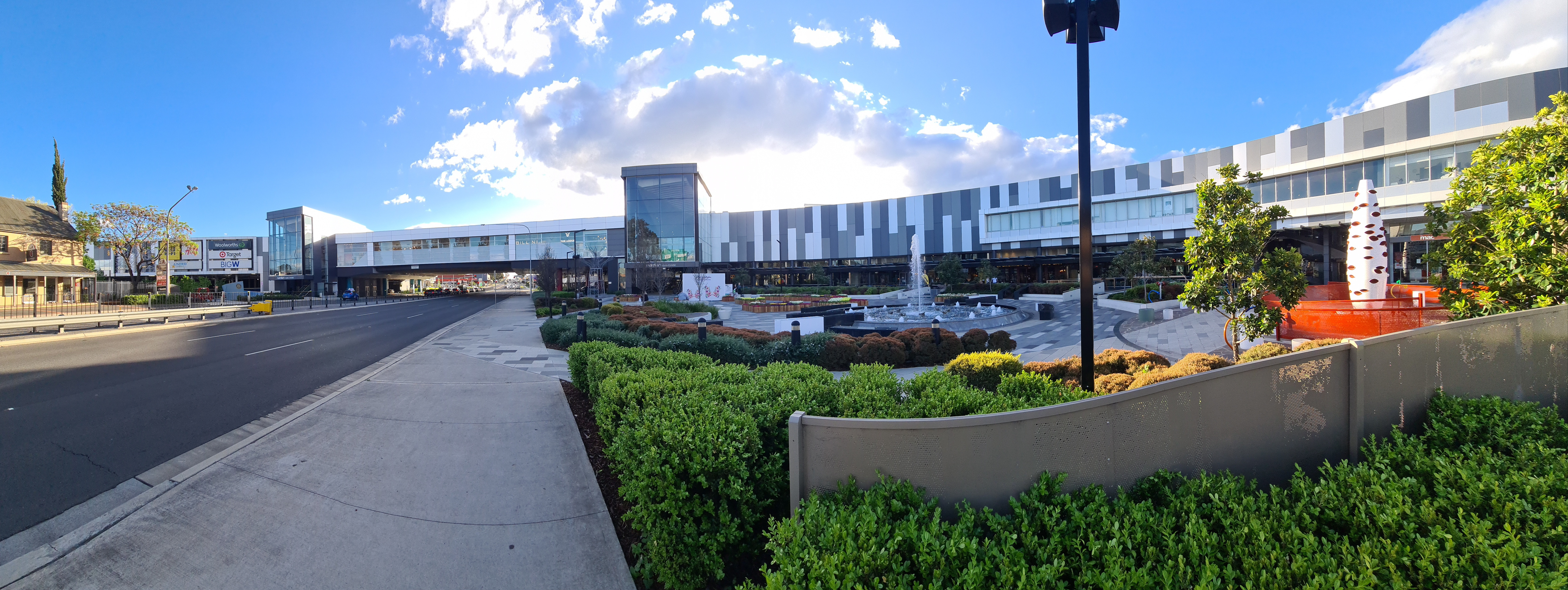
Narellan Town Centre seen from Camden Valley Way

Narellan Town Centre is the largest shopping centres in the South West Growth Area featuring 220 stores including Big W, Kmart, Target, Woolworths, Coles, H&M, JB Hi-Fi and United Cinemas. The centre includes an entertainment precinct, indoor/outdoor restaurants and casual dining precinct, banking precinct, civic plaza cinema, and a car-washing service.

Since the 2017 redevelopment, the centre has two sections with a 38 metre pedestrian bridge, fully enclosed with retail stores across the bridge, over Camden Valley Way connecting the old South side and the new North side. The bridge also acts as entrance points for the Southern Carpark and Northern Carpark below on Camden Valley Way.

The new north side features the history of Narellan and Camden in its civic plaza. These include quotes from the website of local historian, Dr Ian Willis, dioramas of Pansy the Camden tram, and a stylised art piece of the critically endangered Elderslie Banksia.
