= Glenlee railway station =

Former railway station in New South Wales, Australia

Glenlee

General information
- Location: Glenlee Road, Menangle Park, New South Wales; Australia
- Coordinates: 34°05′13″S 150°45′23″E
- Operator: Department of Railways
- Line: Main Southern line
- Distance: 60.711 km (37.724 mi) from Central
- Platforms: 2 (2 side)
- Tracks: 2

Construction
- Structure type: Ground

History
- Opened: 19 August 1884
- Closed: 9 June 1947

Services
Preceding station	Former services	Following station
Menangle Park towards Albury	Main Southern Line	Campbelltown towards Sydney
Location

Glenlee railway station was a railway station on the Main Southern line, serving Glenlee estate within the suburb of Menangle Park in Sydney, New South Wales, Australia. It was open between 1884 and 1947 and is now demolished with little trace remaining. North of the station site lies a triangle junction to the Glenlee colliery, the northern arm of which was electrified and served as the southern extent of electrification on the Main South line until it was cut back to Macarthur in the early 2000s.
