= Campbelltown railway station =

Railway station in Sydney, New South Wales, Australia

Campbelltown
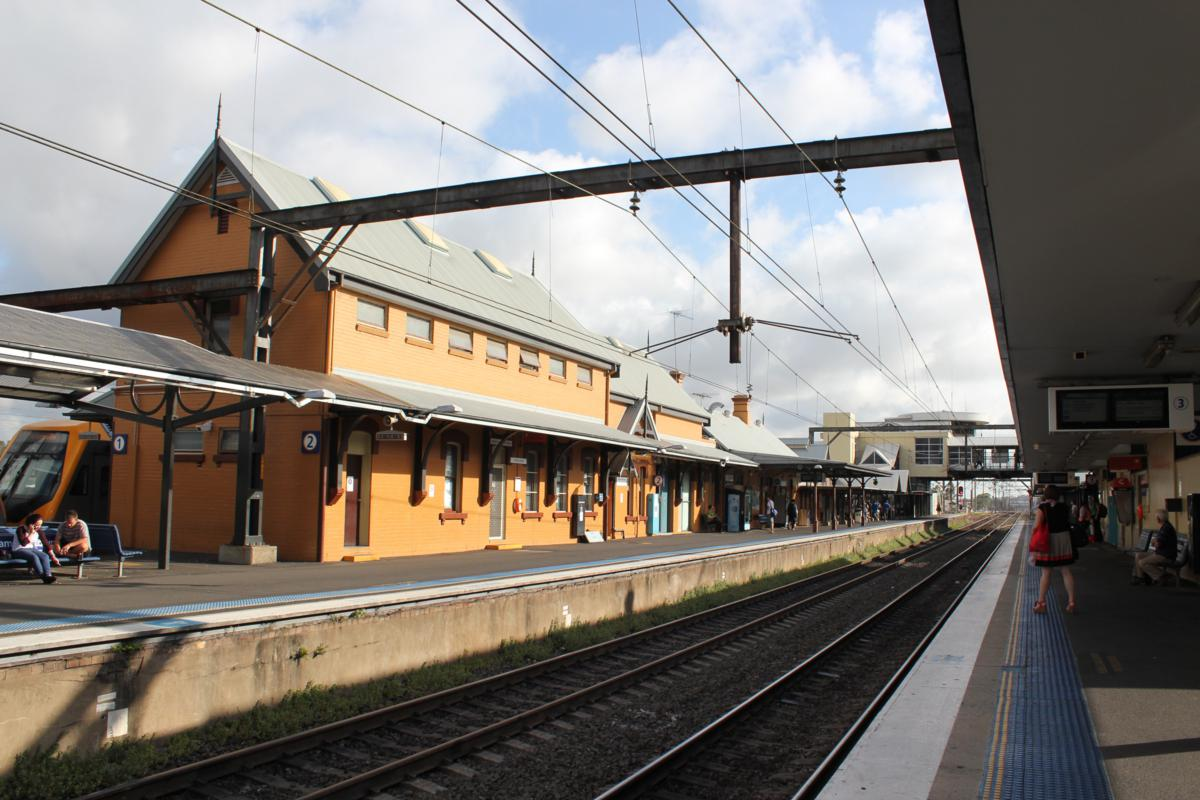
- Northbound view from Platform 3, December 2012

General information
- Location: Hurley Street, Campbelltown
- Coordinates: 34°03′49″S 150°48′52″E
- Elevation: 67 metres (220 ft)
- Owner: Transport Asset Manager of New South Wales
- Operator: Sydney Trains
- Line: Main Southern
- Distance: 41.4 kilometres (25.7 mi) from Central
- Platforms: 4 (1 island, 1 side, 1 bay)
- Tracks: 5
- Connections: Bus

Construction
- Structure type: Ground
- Accessible: Yes

Other information
- Status: Staffed
- Station code: CAM
- Website: Transport for NSW

History
- Opened: 17 May 1858

Passengers
- 2025: 3,116,910 (year); 8.539 (daily) (Sydney Trains)
- Rank: 54

Services
Preceding station	Sydney Trains	Following station
Macarthur Terminus	T8 Airport & South Line	Leumeah towards City Circle
Preceding station	Intercity Trains	Following station
Macarthur towards Moss Vale or Goulburn	Southern Highlands Line	Terminus
Macarthur towards Moss Vale or Goulburn	Southern Highlands Line Limited morning and evening services	Glenfield towards Central
Preceding station	NSW TrainLink	Following station
Mittagong towards Griffith or Canberra	NSW TrainLink Southern Line Griffith and Canberra Xplorers	Sydney Terminus
Moss Vale towards Melbourne	NSW TrainLink Southern Line Melbourne XPT	Sydney Terminus
Former services
Preceding station	Former services	Following station
Glenlee towards Albury	Main Southern Line (pre-1947)	Leumeah towards Sydney
Maryfields towards Camden	Camden Line (1882–1963)	Terminus
Location

Campbelltown railway station is a heritage-listed railway station located on the Main Southern line, serving the Sydney suburb of Campbelltown. It is served by Sydney Trains' T8 Airport & South line services and NSW TrainLink services to Moss Vale, Goulburn, Canberra, Griffith and Melbourne.

== History ==
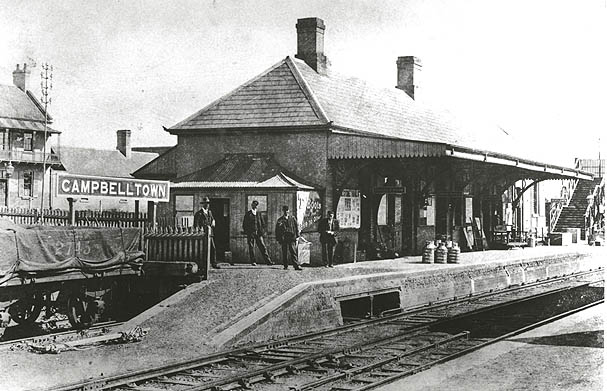
Historical view of the station

Campbelltown Railway Station was briefly the southernmost extent of Great Southern Railway of New South Wales being situated at the end of the Liverpool to Campbelltown railway extension completed in 1858.

The station opened on 4 May 1858 with services commencing 17 May 1858. Preparations for the opening of the railway station commenced after a 3pm meeting at the Court House on 12 March 1858. In the meantime, the railway was progressing towards completion with the Chief Commissioner, Chief Engineer, and railway officials having inspected the progress of station construction on 29 April 1858.

The opening included an afternoon banquet, "with every delicacy upon the table which the colony can produce will be held in the goods station (which has been placed at the disposal of the committee by the Commission).", an evening ball, "upon a scale which would do credit to a much larger town than we can boast of", a band placed on an elevated platform, and separate male and female areas with each area to be waited upon by a man-servant and female respectively.

The revised Great Southern Railway timetable for the opening of the railway listed seven down, and seven up, services; five passenger services, and two mixed services. The journey time from Sydney was 1 hour 45 minutes with 8 stops for a 34-mile journey length. Services from Campbelltown commenced at 6am and finished at 5:30pm. However, soon after opening, the travel time had become 2 hours with services commencing at 6:50am and finishing at 5:45pm and the loss of a goods/mixed service.

Between 1882 and 1963, it was the junction station for the Campbelltown-Camden line.

On 5 May 1968, the Main South line was electrified from Liverpool. It was the extremity of the Sydney suburban network until extended to Macarthur opened in July 1985. However many services still terminate at Campbelltown.

In June 1999, an upgrade to the station including lifts was complete.

In January 2013, the Southern Sydney Freight Line opened on the western side of the station. The station is surrounded by an extensive network of sidings to stable terminating Sydney Trains rolling stock.

Since the second half of 2017, Campbelltown railway station has been served exclusively by the Airport and East Hills line, meaning commuters have to change at Glenfield to travel to either the city via Granville or to Blacktown via the Cumberland Line.

== Platforms and services ==
Platform	Line	Stopping pattern	Notes
1	T8 Airport & South Line	6 morning peak services to Central & the City Circle via Sydenham; 8 terminating services from Central & the City Circle via Sydenham; 2 terminating services from Central & the City Circle via the Airport	
2	T8 Airport & South Line	services to Central & the City Circle via Wolli Creek	
2	Southern Highlands Line	morning services to Central (1 weekday, 2 weekend)	
2	Southern Region	services to Central	Set down only
3	T8 Airport & South Line	services to Macarthur	
3	Southern Highlands Line	1 evening service to Moss Vale; 1 evening service to Goulburn	Pick up only on weekdays; the weekday service divides at Moss Vale
3	Southern Region	services to Canberra, Griffith & Melbourne	Pick up only
4	Southern Highlands Line	services to Moss Vale; 1 weekday evening service to Goulburn	

To the west of the station is Campbelltown Yard, a large rail yard where trains are parked overnight and during the off-peak. The Southern Sydney Freight Line (leased to Australian Rail Track Corporation) also runs through Campbelltown Station. It has no platforms (as it is a freight line) and passes to the west of Campbelltown Yard. There are also a number of sidings and refuges around Campbelltown. Some of these sidings, such as the perway siding and the goods siding (the two dead ends north of the station), are unelectrified, and rarely used. There are no signals permitting a movement into the perway siding (the northern one), so the catch points must be manually closed after receiving permission from the signaller. The other siding is connected to platform 4, a dock platform used by terminating Southern Highlands line trains. All platforms at Campbelltown are long enough for 8 car suburban trains, with the exception of platform 4, which is around 100m long, enough to fit 4 Endeavour cars.

== Transport links ==
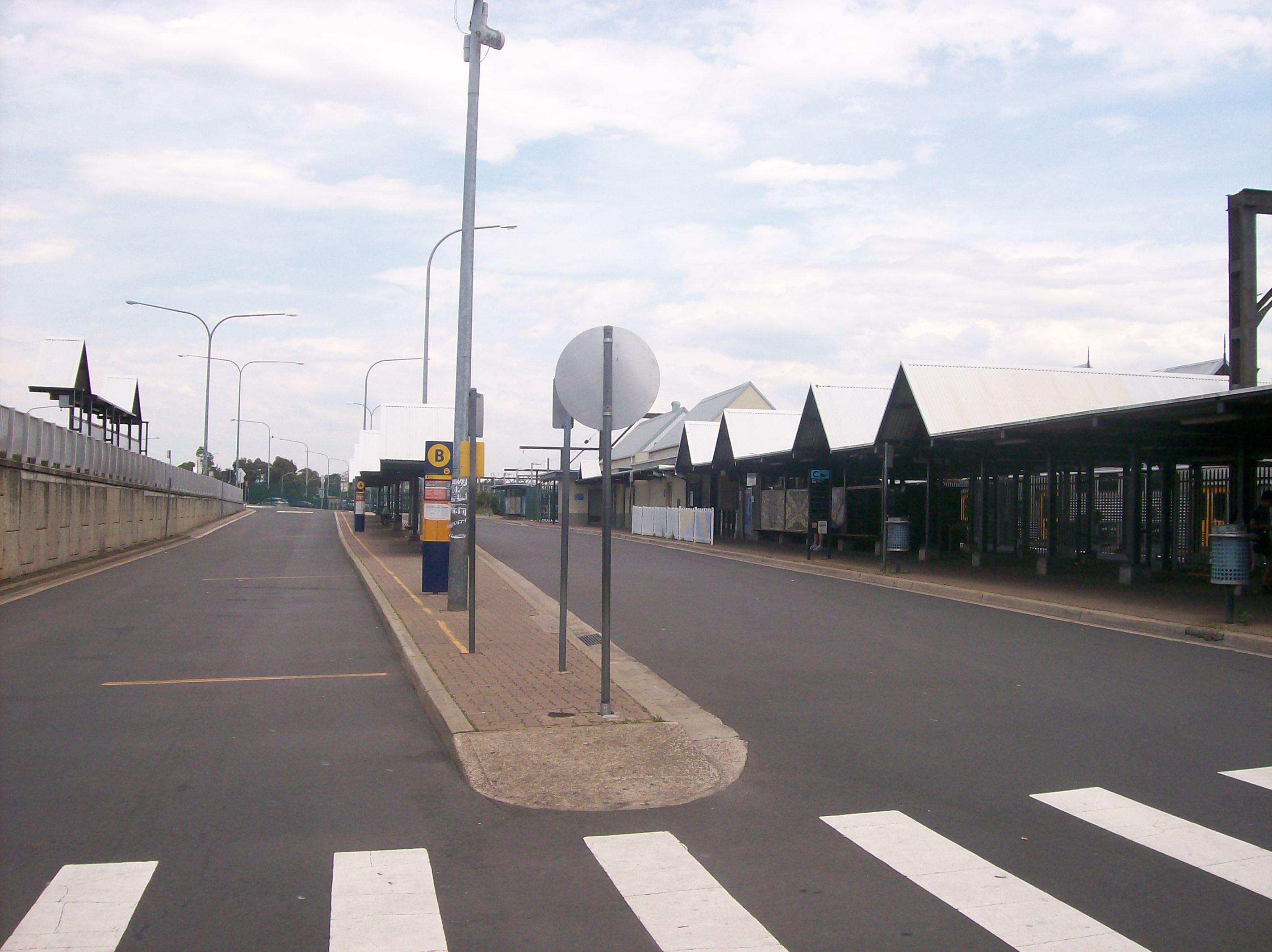
Bus stop bays on east side of station

Campbelltown Station Bus Interchange

Stand A: Transit Systems

- 890: to Harrington Park
- 890C: to Camden
- 891: to Mount Annan South, off-peak extension to Narellan
- 892: to Mount Annan
- 893: to Narellan
- 894: peak hours only to Bridgewater Estate
- 894X: peak hours only to Bridgewater Estate via Camden Bypass
- 895: to Camden South
- 896: to Oran Park Town Centre
- 897: to Smeaton Grange
- 898: peak hours only to Harrington Park, occasional extension to Catherine Field

Stand B: Transit Systems

- 886: to Glen Alpine
- 887: to Wollongong
- 888: to St Helens Park South
- 889: to Menangle

Stand C: Picton Buslines

- 900: to Picton

Stand D: Transit Systems

- 884: to Airds
- 884W: to Wedderburn
- 885: to Bradbury and St Helens Park North

Stand E: Transit Systems

- 878: to Eschol Park
- 879: to Leumeah
- 880: to Minto

Stand F: Transit Systems

- 881: to Leumeah North
- 882: to Leumeah South
- 883: to Ruse
- 883K: to Kentlyn

Stand G: Transit Systems West side

- 840: to Campbelltown Hospital

Stand H: Transit Systems West side

- 840: to Oran Park
- 877: to Kearns via Eagle Vale & Eschol Park
- 880: to Minto via Eagle Vale & Kearns

Campbelltown station is served by one NightRide route:

- N30: Macarthur station to Town Hall station
