= Elderslie, New South Wales =

Elderslie
- Suburb
- Interactive map of Elderslie
- Country: Australia
- State: New South Wales
- City: Sydney
- LGA: Camden Council
- Location: 62 km (39 mi) SW of Sydney CBD

Government
  - State electorate: Camden
  - Federal division: Hume
- Elevation: 80 m (260 ft)

Population
  - Total: 7,878 (2021 census)
- Postcode: 2570
Suburbs around Elderslie
Camden	Kirkham	Narellan
Camden	Elderslie	Narellan
Camden South	Spring Farm	Narellan Vale

Elderslie is a suburb of the Macarthur Region of Sydney in the state of New South Wales, Australia in Camden Council. In addition, it is located on the east side of the Nepean River. It has a small local shop, high school, primary school, skateboard park, netball courts, cricket, Australian Football (AFL) oval, Rugby League oval, a BMX track and a historic house, John Oxley Cottage, which was built in the 1890s and converted into the Camden Visitors' centre in 1989. It was named after explorer John Oxley who held an early grant of land in the area.

== History ==
The area now known as Elderslie was probably originally home to the Tharawal people, based in the Illawarra region, although the Western Sydney-based Darug people and the Southern Highlands-based Gandangara people were also known to have inhabited the greater Camden area. Very early relations with British settlers were cordial but as farmers started clearing and fencing the land affecting food resources in the area, clashes between the groups arose until 1816 when a number of indigenous people were massacred and the remainder retreated from direct conflict with the settlers.

In 1795, a group of lost cattle was discovered in the area, earning it the name Cowpastures. In 1805, a small hut was built at Elderslie near the ford on the Nepean River to house two constables assigned to keep an eye on the cattle. This was the first house built by British settlers in the Camden region. Later the same year, wool pioneer John Macarthur was granted 5,000 acres (20 km²) at Cowpastures. After the land was cleared, it was used for farming for most of the next 200 years until Sydney's suburban sprawl reached the town of Camden and modern suburbs like Elderslie were subdivided into housing blocks.

Elderslie Post Office opened on 1 January 1839 and closed on 30 April 1841 when it was replaced by the nearby Camden office. It reopened on 1 August 1876 and closed in 1969.

== People ==
=== Demographics ===
At the 2021 census, there were 7,878 residents in Elderslie. Aboriginal and Torres Strait Islander people made up 3.7% of the population. The most common ancestries in Elderslie were Australian 41.2%, English 41.0%, Scottish 10.7%, Irish 10.5%, and Italian 5.5%. 83.1% of people were born in Australia. The next most common country of birth was England at 3.4%. 89.1% of people spoke only English at home. The top responses for religious affiliation were No Religion 33.2%, Catholic 27.7%, and Anglican 19.8%.

== Governance ==
Elderslie lies in the south ward of Camden Council, currently (March 2021) represented by Russell Zammit, Eva Campbell and Paul Farrow. It sits within the state electorate of Camden, represented by Labor's Sally Quinnell, and the federal electorate of Hume, represented by the Liberal Party's Angus Taylor.
