= Narellan =

- Suburb
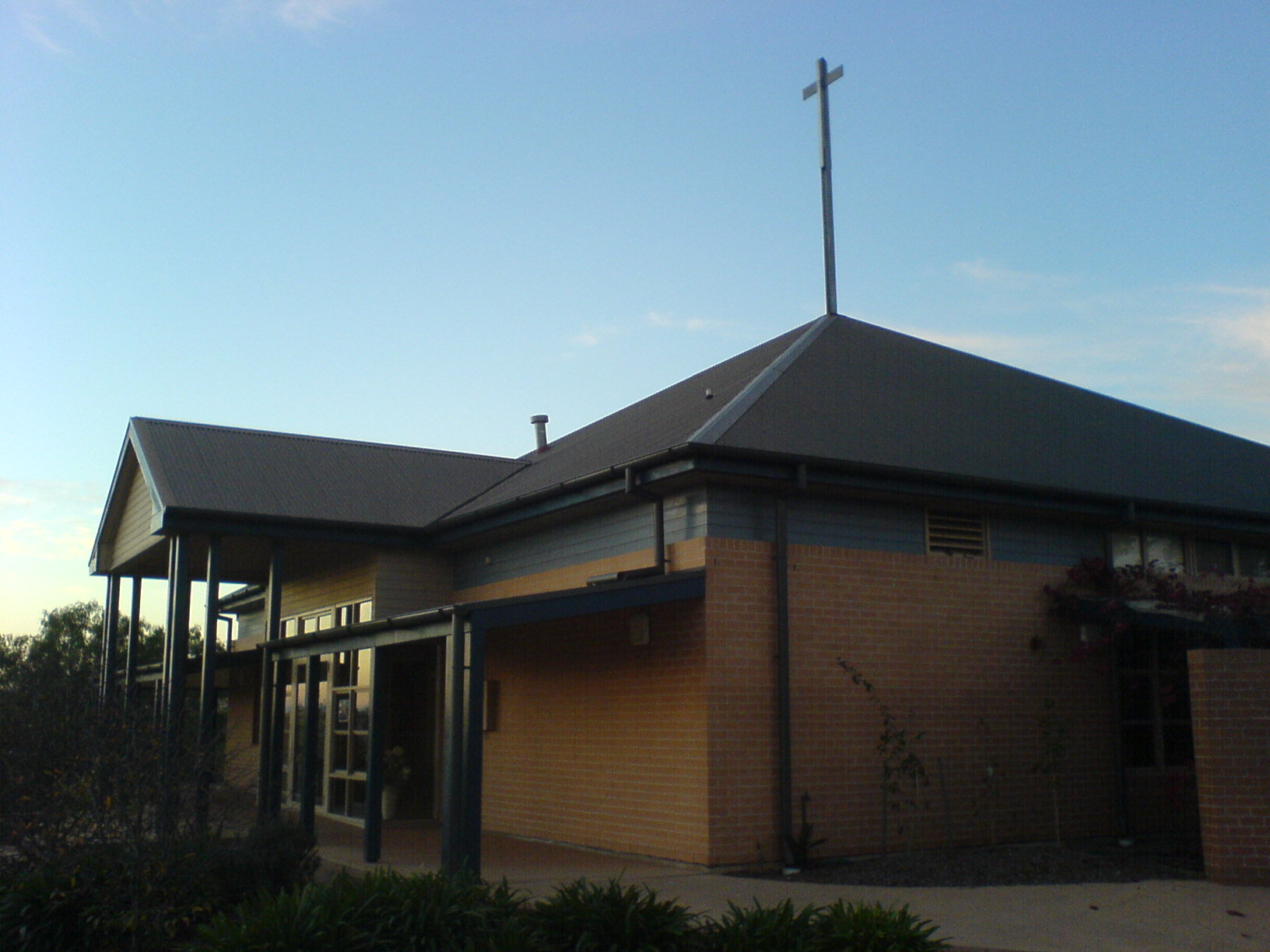
- St Thomas' Anglican Church

- Interactive map of Narellan
- Country: Australia
- State: New South Wales
- Region: Macarthur Region
- City: Sydney
- LGA: Camden Council
- Location: 64 km (40 mi) SW of Sydney CBD; 10 km (6.2 mi) W of Campbelltown; 5 km (3.1 mi) SW of Camden

Government
  - State electorate: Camden
  - Federal division: Hume
- Elevation: 90 m (300 ft)

Population
  - Total: 3,358 (2021 census)
- Postcode: 2567
Suburbs around Narellan
| Kirkham | Harrington Park | Currans Hill |
| Elderslie | Narellan | Narellan Vale |
| Spring Farm | Spring Farm | Narellan Vale |

Narellan is a suburb of Sydney, New South Wales. Narellan is located 60 kilometres south-west of the Sydney central business district, in the local government area of Camden Council and is part of the Macarthur region.

Narellan is known for its modern shopping centre, Narellan Town Centre, historic St Thomas Chapel, Studley Park House and golf course.

== History ==
The area now known as Narellan was probably originally home to the Tharawal people, based in the Illawarra region, although the Western Sydney-based Darug people and the Southern Highlands-based Gandangara people were also known to have inhabited the greater Camden area. Very early relations with British settlers were cordial but as farmers started clearing and fencing the land affecting food resources in the area, clashes between the groups arose until 1816 when a number of indigenous people were massacred and the remainder retreated from direct conflict with the settlers.

In 1805 wool pioneer John Macarthur was granted 5,000 acres (20 km^{2}) at Cowpastures (now Camden). After the land was cleared, it was used for farming for most of the next 200 years until Sydney's suburban sprawl reached the town of Camden and modern suburbs like Narellan were subdivided into housing blocks.

The name of the suburb originates from William Hovell who pronounced it as "Narelling" after receiving a land grant from Governor Macquarie in 1816.

In the 1840s, land allotments were for offered for sale in Narellan but settlement remained scarce owing to the popularity of Camden.

Between 10 March 1882 and 1 January 1963 the area was served by Narellan and Grahams Hill railway stations, on the Camden line.

Narellan Post Office opened on 1 August 1856.

In 2025, the morning following the Bondi beach shooting, a Muslim cemetery in Narellan was desecrated with severed pig heads left on graves.

== Heritage listings ==
Narellan has a number of heritage-listed sites, including:

- Camden Valley Way: Studley Park, Narellan
- Kirkham Lane: Camelot, Kirkham
- Kirkham Lane: Kirkham Stables

== Sport and recreation ==
Narellan was home to the Oran Park Raceway motor racing circuit, which has been redeveloped into a new residential suburb known as Oran Park Town.

Camden Golf Club is the only golf club in Narellan. Narellan also has a football club known as Narellan Rangers located at Nott Oval.

The Narellan Jets play in the local Macarthur Division Rugby League First Grade competition.

The 1st Narellan Scout Group hall is situated on the corner of Queen and Elyard streets (diagonally opposite Narellan Library). The 1st Narellan Scout Group was formed on 1 July 1964 and is open to boys and girls aged 5-8 (Joey Scouts), 8-11 (Cub Scouts), 11-14 (Scouts) and 15-18 (Venturer Scouts). The Venturer Scouts meet at their own hall in neighbouring Elderslie.

== Churches ==
- St Thomas' Anglican Church

== People ==
=== Demographics ===
In the 2021 census, the suburb of Narellan had a population of 3,358 people. Like its neighbouring suburbs, Narellan is predominantly Australian born (82.3%) families with young children (41.9%) living in detached houses (90.6%). The number of people aged 65 and over (15.5%) is less than the national average (17.2%).

=== Notable residents ===
- Jimmy Sharman, boxing promoter
- James Tyson, wealthy pastoralist

== Governance ==
Narellan lies in the central ward of Camden Council, currently represented by Fred Anderson, Rob Elliott and Debby Dewbery. It sits within the state electorate of Camden, represented by the Liberal Party's Peter Sidgreaves, and the federal electorate of Hume.
