= Narellan Vale =

- Suburb
- Interactive map of Narellan Vale
- Country: Australia
- State: New South Wales
- Region: Macarthur
- City: Sydney
- LGA: Camden Council
- Location: 60 km (37 mi) SW of Sydney CBD
- Established: 1986

Government
  - State electorate: Camden
  - Federal division: Hume
- Elevation: 98 m (322 ft)

Population
  - Total: 6,931 (2021 census)
- Postcode: 2567
Suburbs around Narellan Vale
Narellan	Smeaton Grange	Smeaton Grange
Narellan	Narellan Vale	Mount Annan
Spring Farm	Spring Farm	Mount Annan

Narellan Vale is a suburb of Sydney, in the Australian state of New South Wales. Narellan Vale is located 60 kilometres south-west of the Sydney central business district, in the local government area of Camden Council and is part of the Macarthur region.

== History ==
The area now known as Narellan Vale was probably originally home to the Tharawal people, based in the Illawarra region, although the Western Sydney-based Darug people and the Southern Highlands-based Gandangara people were also known to have inhabited the greater Camden area. Very early relations with British settlers were cordial but as farmers started clearing and fencing the land affecting food resources in the area, clashes between the groups arose until 1816 when a number of indigenous people were massacred and the remainder retreated from direct conflict with the settlers.

In 1805, wool pioneer John Macarthur was granted 5,000 acres (20 km^{2}) at Cowpastures (now Camden). After the land was cleared, it was used for farming until the mid-1980s when Sydney's suburban sprawl reached the town of Camden and Areas like Narellan Vale were Established.

In 1986 Narellan Vale was established and then two years later in 1988 Elizabeth Macarthur High school opened and then a few years later Narellan Vale Public School And St Clare's Catholic Primary School opened, the suburb was completed by 1998.

== Demographics ==
According to the 2021 census of population, there were 6,931 people in Narellan Vale.

- Aboriginal and Torres Strait Islander people made up 4.1% of the population.
- 82.6% of people were born in Australia. The next most common countries of birth were England 2.7% and New Zealand 1.5%.
- 86.3% of people spoke only English at home.
- The most common responses for religion were No Religion 30.7%, Catholic 29.7% and Anglican 18.5%.
- There was a high percentage of families with children (51.9%).
- The percentage of children aged 0–14 (21.7%) is substantially higher than the national average (18.2%).
- Like its neighbouring suburbs, there is also a very high proportion of detached houses in the area (97.2%).

== Education ==
There are three schools in Narellan Vale:

- Narellan Vale Public School
- St Clare's Catholic Primary School
- Elizabeth Macarthur High School

== Governance ==
Narellan Vale lies in the central ward of Camden Council, currently represented by Theresa Fedeli, the current mayor of Camden, Rob Mills and Ashleigh Cagney. It sits within the state electorate of Camden, represented by Liberal's Peter Sidgreaves and the federal electorate of Hume represented by Liberal's Angus Taylor.
