= Currans Hill =

- Suburb
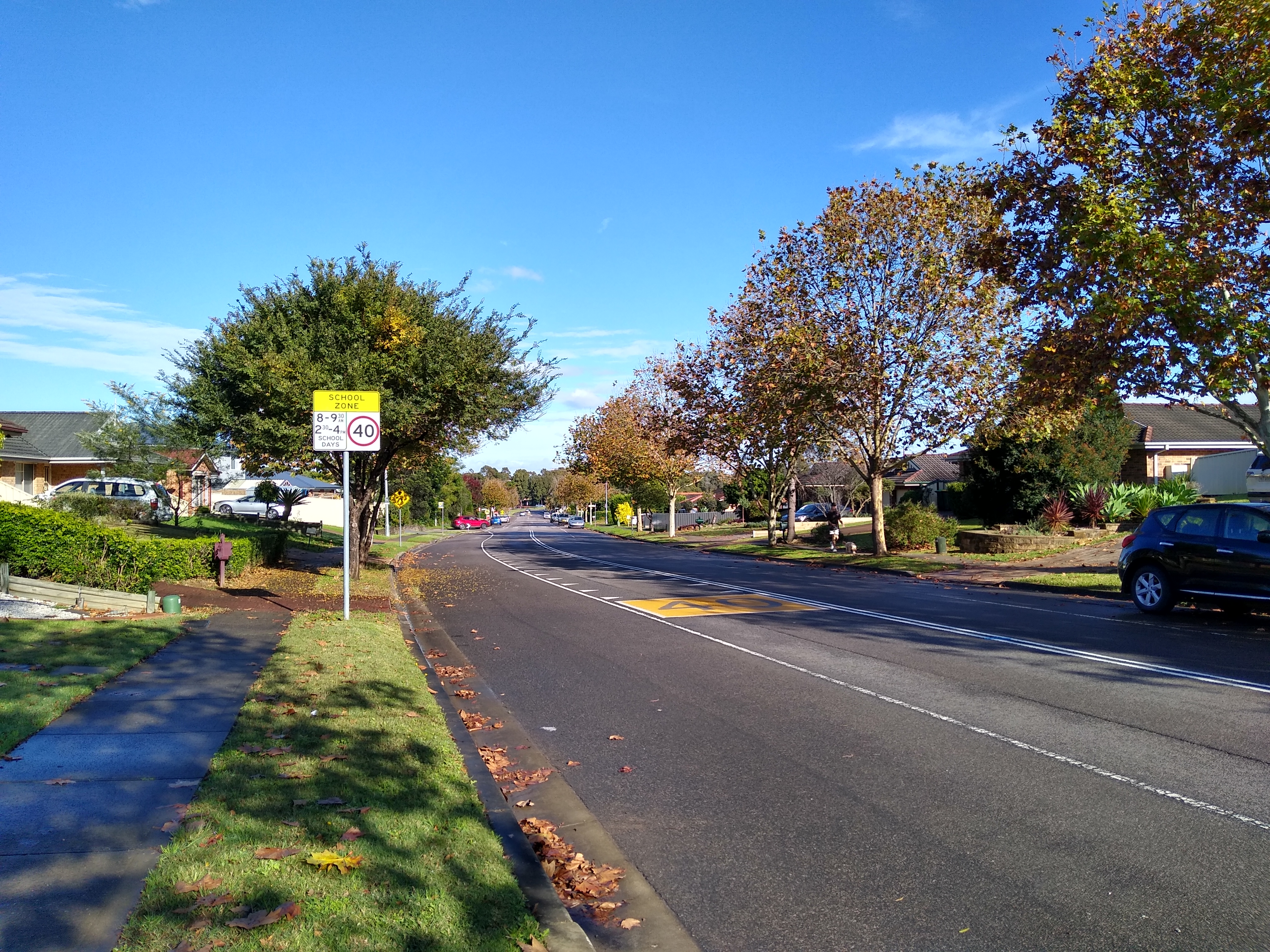

- Interactive map of Currans Hill
- Country: Australia
- State: New South Wales
- Region: Macarthur
- City: Sydney
- LGA: Camden Council
- Location: 60 km (37 mi) from Sydney CBD

Government
  - State electorate: Camden
  - Federal division: Macarthur
- Elevation: 89 m (292 ft)

Population
  - Total: 5,541 (2021 census)
- Postcode: 2567
Suburbs around Currans Hill
Harrington Park	Catherine Field	Eschol Park
Smeaton Grange	Currans Hill	Blairmount
Mount Annan	Mount Annan	Campbelltown

Currans Hill is a suburb of Sydney in the state of New South Wales, Australia. It is 60 km (37 mi) south-west of the Sydney central business district, in the local government area of Camden Council and is part of the Macarthur region.

== History ==
The area now known as Currans Hill was originally home to the Muringong, southernmost of the Darug people. In 1805 John Macarthur established his property at Camden where he raised merino sheep.

== People ==
=== Demographics ===
In the 2021 census, there were 5,541 residents in Currans Hill. Aboriginal and Torres Strait Islander people made up 4.9% of the population. The median age of people in Currans Hill was 32 years. Children aged 0–14 years made up 25.6% of the population and people aged 65 years and over made up 7.6% of the population. In Currans Hill, 80.8% of people were born in Australia. The next most common countries of birth were England 2.4%, New Zealand 1.7%, Philippines 1.5%, Fiji 0.8% and India 0.8%. 83.3% of people spoke only English at home. Other languages spoken at home included Spanish at 1.7%. The most common responses for religion were No Religion 31.9%, Catholic 29.1% and Anglican 15.8%.

== Governance ==
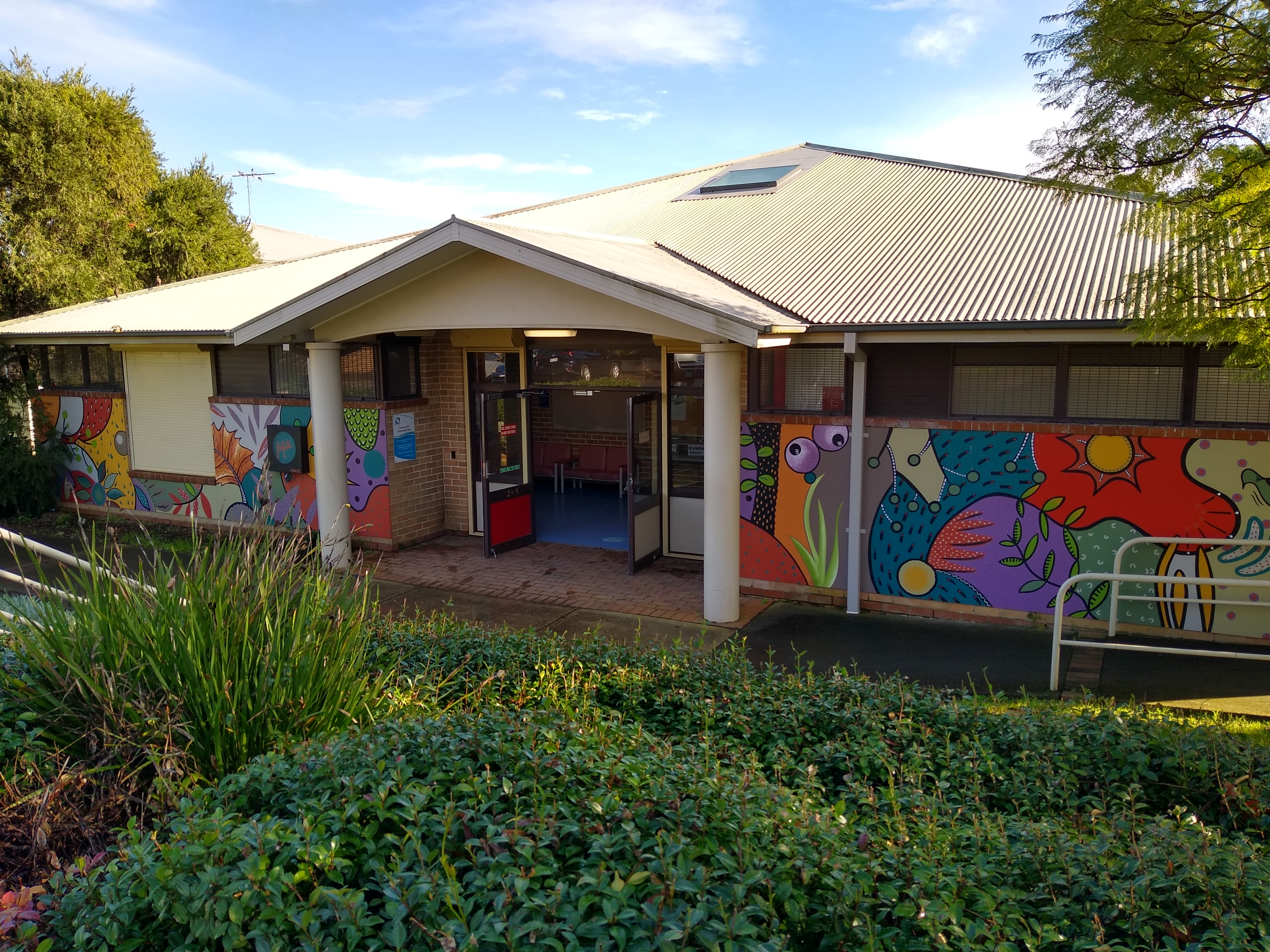
Currans Hill Community Hall

Currans Hill is part of the central ward of Camden Council represented by Ashleigh Cagney, Theresa Fedeli (currently deputy mayor of Camden), and Rob Mills. Peter Sidgreaves is currently the local mayor. The suburb is contained within the federal electorate of Macarthur, represented by Michael Freelander (Labor), and the state electorate of Camden, currently held by Sally Quinnell (Labor).
