= Camden railway station =

Former railway station in Sydney, New South Wales, Australia

Camden
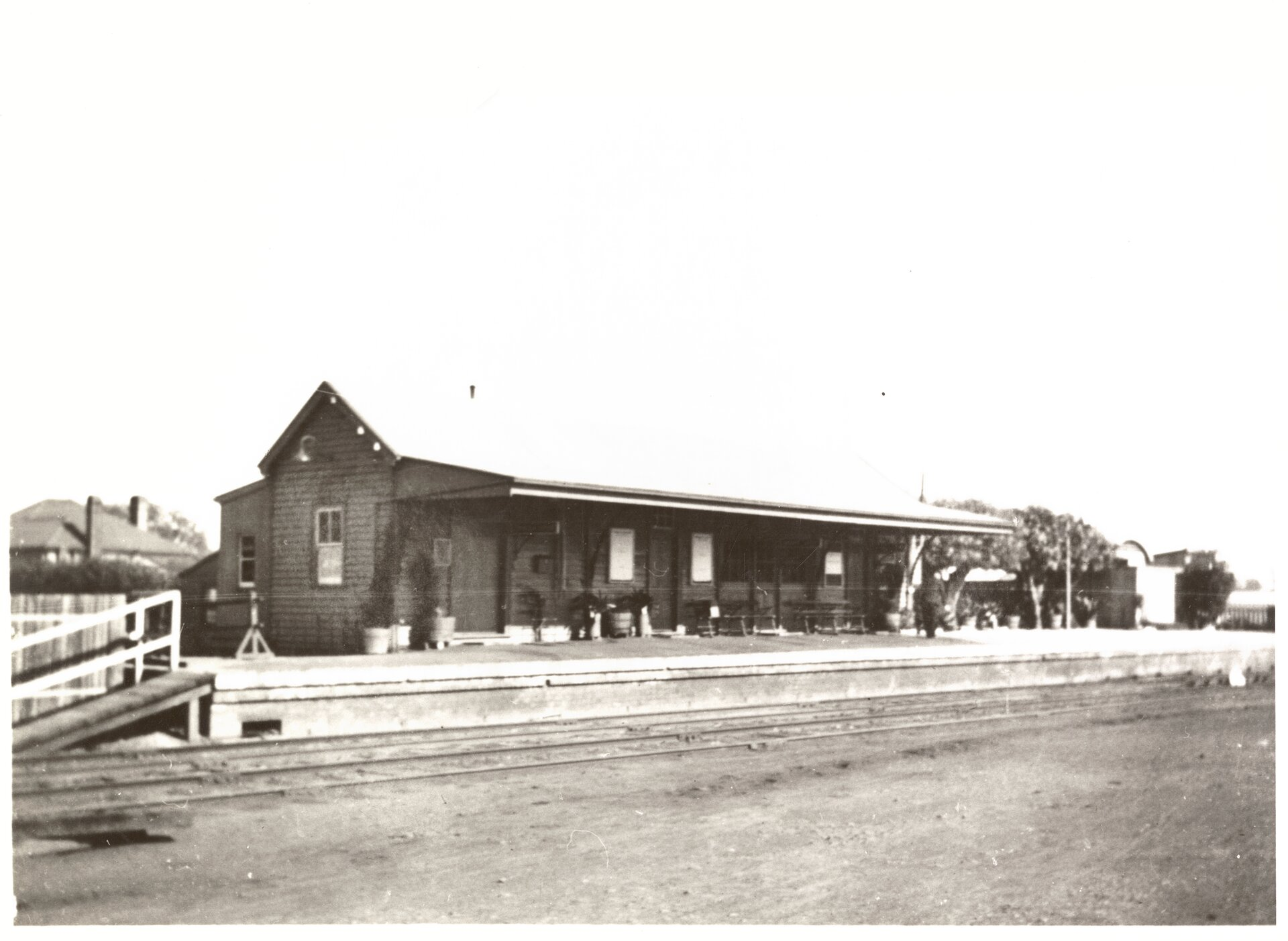
- View of the station and siding in 1937

General information
- Location: Australia
- Coordinates: 34°03′08″S 150°41′54″E
- Operator: Department of Railways
- Line: Camden
- Distance: 67.30 kilometres (41.82 mi) from Central
- Platforms: 1
- Tracks: 1

Construction
- Structure type: Ground

Other information
- Status: Demolished

History
- Opened: 10 March 1882
- Closed: 1 January 1963

Services
Preceding station	Former services	Following station
Terminus	Camden Line	Elderslie towards Campbelltown
Location

Camden railway station was a railway station in Camden and the terminus of the Camden line in South Western Sydney. It opened along with the line on 10 March 1882 and closed along with it on 1 January 1963. Apart from the stationmaster's residence, the station is no longer extant.

== History ==
Camden station opened on its first location on 10 March 1882, 11.56 kilometres from the junction with the Main Southern line. A waiting shed existed on the down track, as well as a run-round. In January 1883, the line was extended and the station was relocated. At this point, there was a goods siding, as well as a siding on the up track and a crossover. The station has a waiting shed and an office, whereas the original waiting shed from the initial temporary site was moved to Kirkham Lane. A station master's house was constructed in 1889 next to the passenger station building, which was moved in 1901. Some improvements were also made to the station.

In 1930, a siding was created to serve Dairy Farmers.

The Camden line had been perpetually unprofitable and lacked investment, and a bus service had operated the length of the line in 1925 and from 23 February 1961. The line closed on 1 January 1963. The final train departed Campbelltown just after midnight and arrived at Camden at 12:55am.

== Services ==
The Camden line initially carried three daily return services, which was later increased to six, with a journey time to Campbelltown of approximately 40 minutes.

== Gallery ==
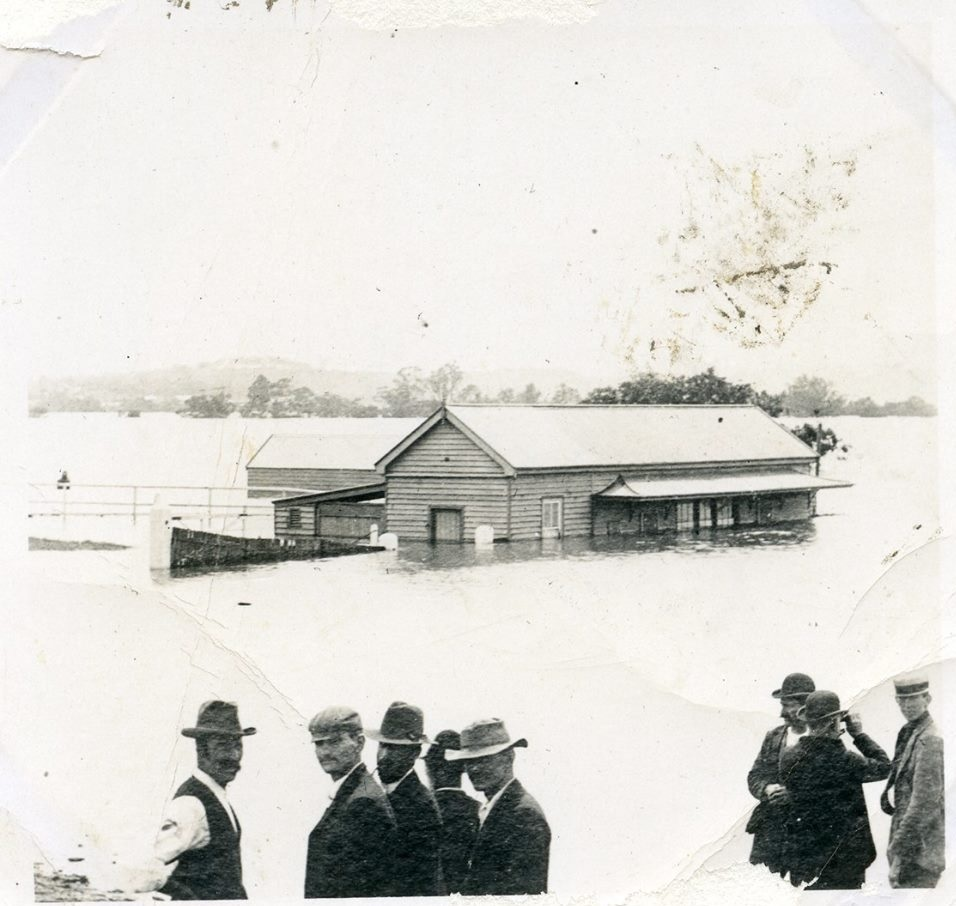
The station building visible above floodwaters, 1899.

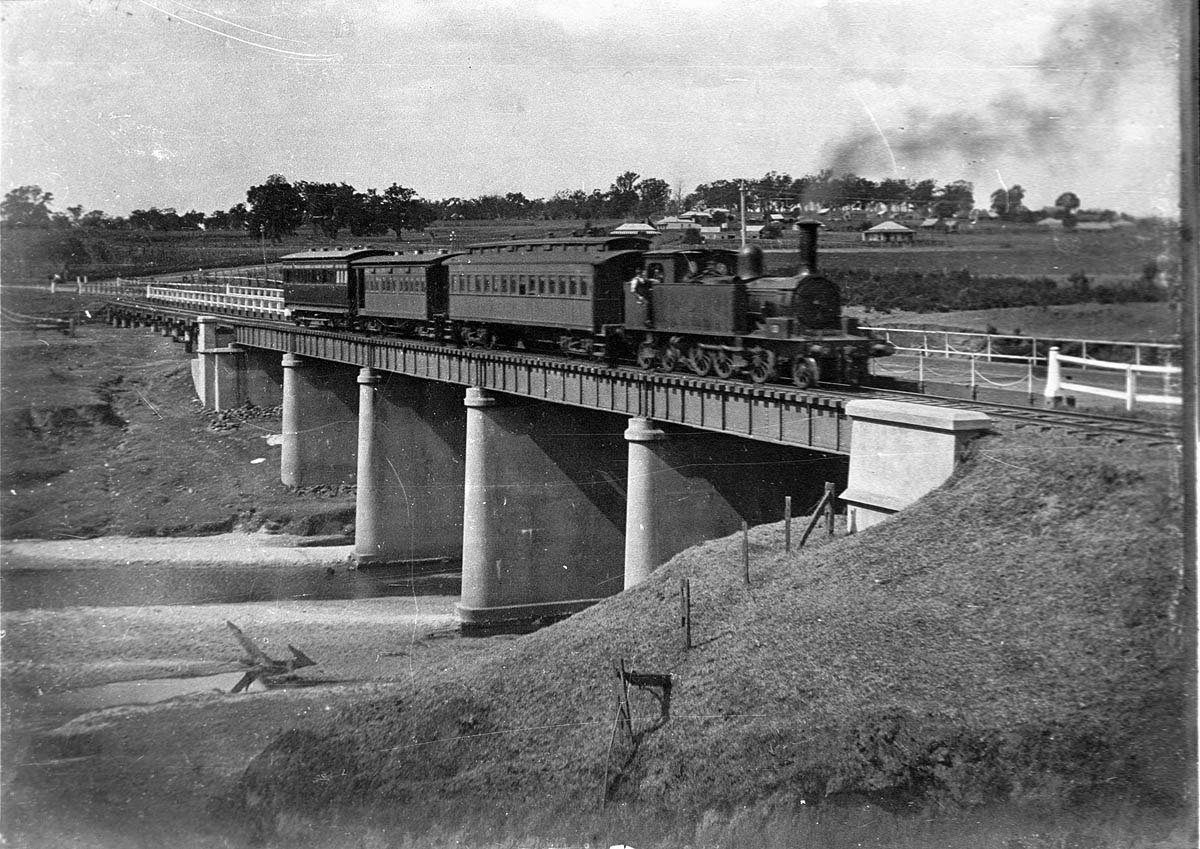
Passenger service in Camden, circa 1930

== See also ==
- Camden railway line
