= Harrington Park =

Harrington Park is the name of the following places:

- Harrington Park, New Jersey, a borough in Bergen County, NJ, USA
- Harrington Park, New South Wales, a suburb of Sydney, New South Wales, Australia
  - Harrington Park (homestead), a heritage-listed homestead located within the suburb of Harrington, New South Wales
