= Orielton, Harrington Park =

Orielton
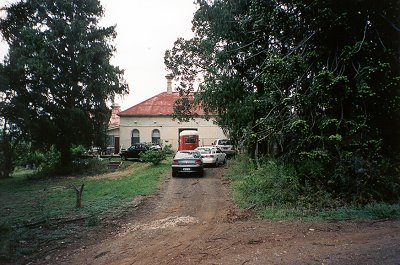
- View of the c.1840s single storey Georgian Homestead and remnant early plantings

- Location within Sydney Location within Australia
- 34°01′29″S 150°43′25″E
- Location: 181–183 Northern Road, Harrington Park, Camden Council, New South Wales, Australia

History
- Built: 1815–1834

Site notes
- Architectural style: Victorian Italianate

New South Wales Heritage Register
- Official name: Orielton; Orielton Farm; Orielton Homestead
- Type: State heritage (landscape)
- Designated: 22 December 2006
- Reference no.: 1693
- Type: Historic Landscape
- Category: Landscape – Cultural

Orielton is a heritage-listed former hunting, pleasure garden, farming estate, weekender, cereal cropping, flour mill and pastoral property and now horse agistment and residence located at 181–183 Northern Road in the south-western Sydney suburb of Harrington Park in the Camden Council local government area of New South Wales, Australia. It was designed and built from 1815 to 1834. It is also known as Orielton Farm and Orielton Homestead. The property is privately owned. It was added to the New South Wales State Heritage Register on 22 December 2006.

== History ==
=== Early Colonial history ===
Edward Lord was granted 655.5 hectares (1,620 acres) in the Parish of Narellan that he then named Orielton Park in about 1815. He established a Tasmanian property and this Camden (Cowpastures) property from 1814. His principal residence was in Tasmania. Initial occupation at Camden/Narellan probably included siting a shelter to take in the sublime prospect afforded by the current location of the house. Timber-getting for fuel and fencing and clearing of land for cropping were establishment processes of this time. The initial landscape was probably open forest with grass understorey. Lord's grant included extensive alluvial flats along Narellan Creek and these were probably soon put to cultivation for cereal and hay production.

Orielton was used from 1822 to 1841 as an outstation by John Dickson. James Dickson (John's brother) lived at Nonorrah (now Maryland) to the north and managed both properties. Agricultural use of Orielton from the 1828 census showed cattle and sheep stocked on Dickson's properties and he cultivated land for cropping, growing cereal (wheat and barley) for milling in his mills. Dickson would probably have sited (probably the confirmed (later) house site) the main residence (manager's house) to provide an outlook and surveillance over the estate. He was using Orielton for cereal production and dairy cheese-making and built barns and operated threshing and winnowing machinery. The Australian Auction Company described Orielton estate as having a substantial built brick cottage, commodious stabling, an excellent built barn with two floors, containing therein 8 horse-power threshing and winnowing machine'. This was probably built c. 1830. In 1834, fifty men were working on the farm at Orielton - there would have been extensive quarters. The steam mill (three storeys high) was constructed in this period, possibly by Dickson, but most likely by the trustees.

In 1834 Orielton was noted in letters written by David Waugh as being a productive farm. By 1835, 93 hectares (230 acres) of Orielton estate was amalgamated with the neighbouring Wivenhoe.

In 1847 it was purchased by Camden miller, John Perry who had been using its mill and occupying Orielton before purchase. Perry was growing cereals and milling them for flour. Agriculture continued with cereal crops and livestock grazing. Perry later subdivided a portion of the estate and leased the main property to Charles Thompson, Clerk of the Bench to Camden Court. During the whole of this early period the estate seems to have been used mainly for grazing, with some limited agriculture.

=== Ownership, 1861 to 1876 ===
In 1861 William Peisley, a carcass butcher bought Orielton. From 1861 until 1864 when Peisley put it up for auction and it was bought by (Sydney) absentee owner, "gentleman" John Thomas Neile. Neile bought the estate in two parcels – the Home Farm (in 1864, of 134 hectares (330 acres)), 81 hectares (200 acres) in cultivation; and a second farm on the other (eastern) side of the "Great South" (now The Northern) Road, of 81 hectares (200 acres) with a farm house and stockyard. The Mill (recently built by previous owner Perry, the miller "on the best position in the district" and in 24 hectares (59 acres) of paddocks, was passed in at auction. Neile then bought it for A£600 – a knock-down price for so elaborate a structure. He maintained the whole property as a going concern until 1876. It featured extensive cleared and fenced paddocks, paling-fenced orchard and picking garden adjacent to the west side of the house, extensive buildings/quarters set on a knoll above the alluvial flats and below the ridge line, extensive trees and shrubs to the east or front entry, probably cypress, Bunya or hoop pines and other broad-canopied trees, a three-storey mill, livestock shelters and paddocks, ploughed paddocks and a cottage fronting the Northern Road's eastern side farm.

In 1863 Abraham Davy of Harrington Park purchased Lot 1 of Orielton Farm (24 hectares (59 acres)) from three Sydney businessmen who had earlier purchased the estate - John Lait of Sydney, James Ryan of Emu Plains and James Jones of Sydney.

An auction notice in 1864 describes Orielton's extensive development. It was sold to Neile, who bought a major homestead with infrastructure. A c. 1860 (likely 1865) photograph from the summit of the hill to the west, shows a well-kept farm complex in an ordered estate. The Peisley family came to be regarded as local gentry and some family members remained prominent in the district after they left Orielton in 1876. People came to Orielton from Sydney, using the train to Campbelltown to shoot over Orielton's land and attend the adjacent Harrington Park race track. The Peisley family knew the Davy family who occupied Harrington Park from 1852 to 1870.

During the early 1870s the sport of coursing (the pursuit of live hares by greyhounds across the countryside) was introduced to Orielton which became a popular activity at both the Orielton and Harrington Park estates. By the 1870s Harrington Park house had established a reputation as a gentleman's country seat, with "hospitality, picturesqueness and the hunt bringing interesting associations to the English eye".

In 1874, Harrington Park and Lot 1 of Orielton was purchased by William Rudd Snr, a grazier of Houtong Station in the Lower Murrumbidgee who also then owned neighbouring Harrington Park. Rudd changed the perceptions of Orielton and Harrington Park as a "gentleman's seat" to that of a graziers property. He also gained control of the remaining parts of Orielton estate. Harrington Park and Orielton remained within the Rudd and Britton (descendant) families until 1933 when (with the Great Depression having an impact) they were sold to Arthur and Elaine Swan.

=== Ownership, 1876 to 1943 ===
Mrs Harriet Beard, widow of Wynyard Square, Sydney bought and occupied Orielton in 1876 when the Rudds were living at Harrington Park and both were responsible for developing the properties in the Victorian period building design and garden or landscape schemes. The Beard family became involved in district affairs and were esteemed as gentry. The Beards changed and developed the homestead extensively to relate to the southern prospect and expansive views to Studley Park and the floodplain of Narellan Creek. At one stage, a small school was conducted at Orielton. With the shift to grazing, the great barn would have lost its original function. The existing access and arrival drives date to this era, as does the terracing south of the house and its extension and reorientation to the south, with two-storey Victorian Italianate style southern facade. Harriet appears to have made Orielton a large residential villa, making many garden plantings including Bunya pines, hoop pines, funeral cypress, Moreton Bay fig, maritime pine, Austrian pine, privet (hedges), photinia (hedges) and European olives to the orchard's northern boundary. These plantings probably reflect Victorian era symbolism relating to her loss of a husband, and some may relate to her own death in 1910. The estate was held in trust until it sold in 1912 to Frederick Walker (solicitor), Henry Webster (Bank Manager) and John Morton (physician) as joint tenants and was leased to Ephraim Cross, a Narellan storekeeper. Cross' family had been Camden brickmakers (making bricks for Studley Park and Camelot), and later bought the property. The 1912 sale was of approximately 372 hectares (919 acres), 202 hectares (500 acres) of which were cleared, balanced and ring-barked, subdivided into paddocks and well-grassed and watered from the creek with five dams. The property was described as having "extensive stabling and carriage room, milking shed, barns, vegetable gardens etc, etc. Brick barn (100" x 40') of 3 floors, engine house, saw bench, pumping plant, windmill, workshop, two cottages'.

Cross sold the section east of The Northern Road to Harrington Park in 1926 and the remainder (including the houe) to Yvonne Coleman in 1927. The northern farm building was lost in a fire in 1928. It was considered by the local community to be where Cross operated a spirits distillery. Coleman sold it in 1930 to William Bernard Pilling of Rushcutters' Bay, builder and investor, who in turn sold it in 1931 to William Henry Trautwein, of Sydney, manager, through Union Investments. The property then returned to Pilling's ownership.

The Pilling family in 1930 had Orielton run by estate managers with its homestead being maintained as a country residence for the family to visit. Daughter Eileen Pilling described her father as not a farmer but that he had bought 405 hectares (1,000 acres) at Narellan which included Orielton estate. He ran 100 cows on the southern end of it, where timber bales with galvanised iron roofs housed the cows. The family lived in Elizabeth Bay. She would visit on school holidays and remembers the ornate iron verandah, bullnose bay, French doors onto the verandah with vistas to Narellan. She recalls the long drive lined with trees and at the entry to the house a carriage loop circled close to the garden, within which a large aviary was located with many colourful birds. Towards the front of the house was a tennis court (east of the carriage loop) and stone steps led to the Italianate facade through splendid gardens. An orchard west of the homestead was filled with nuts and fruit, including walnuts and almonds. A ballroom was located underneath the house.

By 1938 the Swans had purchased all the remaining parts of Orielton, and managed the two farms (with Harrington Park) as a single entity. The Swans upgraded the sections of Orielton's farm buildings and then allowed the Department of Defence to make the homestead liveable for their occupation, from 1942 to 1943.

During World War II the Camden district was the scene of much military activity, and Orielton was occupied by the army for training and residential purposes.

=== Post World War II ===
Since 1944 Orielton has been owned by the Fairfax family who also own neighbouring Harrington Park. The Fairfax family resided at Harrington Park and Orielton was managed as part of the Harrington Park estate. Orielton was important in Sir Warwick Oswald Fairfax's pursuit of breeding Stud Hereford cattle. The yarding, sheds and paddocks were modified to cater for the extensive breeding program he undertook. He set Orielton up as his holding and breeding centre for Harrington Park Poll Hereford stud. Fencing, paddocks and shelters were established to raise and manage stud livestock. The steam mill appears to have been pulled down during this initial period of occupation. During this period, the property was an outstation with tenants occupying Orielton house. A dam visible in a 1947 aerial photograph south-west of the homestead was expanded by Fairfax c. 1958, across the western boundary of the former picking garden and orchard. In the 1960s Warwick Fairfax was knighted, Orielton's windows were boarded up and some parts of the estate were used for goat farming.

Realignment of The Northern Road to the east in the 1970s including a new bridge over Narellan Creek east of the previous one, led to the cutting off of Orielton's (south-eastern-running) main drive (towards Narellan Creek). A new extension was added, making the drive a "V" shape and joining the Northern road further north, roughly in line but to the east of the main homestead and farm management complex.

The subdivision of Harrington Park in the 1990s for urban development has visually encroached upon Orielton estate, with Harrington Park suburb abutting The Northern Road alongside it and Kirkham Lane large-lot residences approaching its south-western flanks north of Narellan Creek. Cattle grazing fields and shelter sheds lining Orielton's northern edge of Narellan Creek are apparent in a 1990 aerial photograph but absent in a 2005 one. The original grant and its management for grazing can still be understood in the broader landscape of the Narellan Valley.

== Description ==
=== Setting ===
Orielton Park is located within the Central Hills complex of the Scenic Hills of the Camden Valley. The property is enclosed by a ridge to the north and to the west. The property has been developed around the Narellan Creek which drains the eastern and northern hills of this valley to the Nepean River, which passes through Camden and then into the Hawkesbury River. Soils are predominately clays derived from the underlying Wianamatta shale.

The area is characterised by subdivision, development and extensive grass(ed) hills and forest. Orielton homestead Lot is currently bound on the north, south and west by open paddocks and to the east by The Northern Road. Recent residential developments have begun to the south-west of the homestead complex and will continue.

Rainfall is approximately 750 millimetres (30 in) per year. Soils are predominantly clays derived from the underlying Wianamatta shale which is over sandstone. Vegetation systems are related to soils and hydrology. Narrellan Creek has a significant surviving tree and grass ecology. The river flats have remnant trees and express the past land uses of agricultural cropping, pasture improvement and recreation pursuits. The hills and slopes have remnant trees and shrubs associated with this environment. The whole site is part of the Cumberland Plain or Cowpastures region.

The home paddock surrounding the homestead was separated from the surrounding farm management complex and arable land and pasture by fencing. Orielton has a relationship to its surrounding rural landscape. Early photographs and plans and aerial photographs from the 1940s onwards show that the homestead operated as a whole precinct of functional spaces and buildings. Despite minor changes to garden settings and access ways, the estate was divided into the following general areas:

The main homestead, presentation garden and recreation areas: tennis court, riding;

- Picking gardens and orchards;
- Farm management complex and working areas (the former Mill, silos, etc.);
- Grazing pastures;
- Narellan Creek and arable (crop) land.

Within the precinct there are important functional relationships between the main homestead, pleasure gardens and entry, the picking garden, farm management complex and workers' buildings and homestead, working areas (including mills, silos) and access roads (The Northern Road), stables and grazing pastures.

The change in entry was a result of the change in ownership and subsequent design style and period. It is suggested the Victorian Italianate style was influenced by the Picturesque movement. Homes were set in their extensive gardens and entry to these landed gentry estates resulted in a more formal procession to the house. The change in driveway access does not suggest a negative impact on the original functional relationship of the precinct.

=== Garden and grounds ===
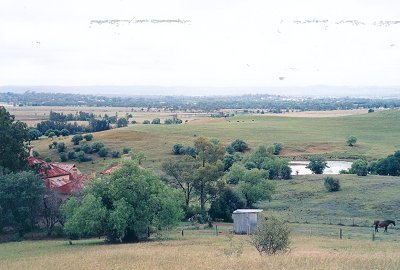
View from northern ridge looking south west to Homestead Precinct and dam

The garden appears to express Harriet Beard's occupation of the site and the Victorian period design styles. To the east of the homestead the gardens comprise a carriage loop with densely planted species including Bunya pines and a Moreton Bay fig (Ficus macrophylla). The area is delineated by collapsing timber post and wire strand fencing leading into the paddocks. The original northern entry came from the north-east of this area as the road linked to Maryland further up the Northern Road and physical evidence shows how it linked to the current carriage loop. The levelled portion of land directly east of the carriage loop was the tennis court. This area was expanded recently, filled with spoil from Roads & Maritime Services road works on the Northern Road. This area is currently used for horse agistment.

Evidence of formal gardens appears in the 1947 aerial photograph with remnant hedges forming the lines of formal gardens. Presently there is little found-evidence of the original gardens apart from terracing, steps and trees and a couple of rose bushes.

The southern entry relating to Narellan, Campbelltown and Camden resulted in the formal garden being relocated (to the house's south). Like the early garden, little remains. The current entry drive passes the formal gardens and links to the early carriage loop. The drive is lined with prominent pines (Araucaria spp.). The 1947 aerial photograph shows semi-circular gardens (beds) in front of the Italianate portion of the homestead with associated planting and arrangements. The ashlar steps leading up to the "front" of the garden are still intact, however little garden arrangement and vegetation remain.

More mature plantings were on the north-east side of the house, the main garden, Between the Northern Road and the homestead. A mature Bunya pine (Araucaria bidwillii) features on the northern edge of the garden. Other large hoop (A.cunninghamii) and Bunya pines are also now a feature of the garden and driveway. Mature conifers (?Cypresses) were notable in an undated 19th century photograph of the homestead group, east of the house. A large barn featured to the south east of the house in the same photograph. There were few trees in the paddocks but the landscape between Orielton and (neighbouring) Harrington Park shows that there was little change between the early photograph and one taken in December 2007.

Significant tree plantings include the following species: Bunya Bunya pine (Araucaria bidwillii), hoop pines (A.cunninghamii), funeral cypress (Cupressus funebris), maritime pine (Pinus pinaster), she oak (Casuarina sp.), Brazilian peppercorn (Schinus areira), Moreton Bay fig (Ficus macrophylla), privet (Ligustrum sp.) and jacaranda (J.mimosifolia). Scattered plantings include native kurrajong (Brachychiton populneus), deodar or Himalayan cedar (Cedrus deodara) and privet (Ligustrum sp.) trees.

A couple of rose bushes remain on the terraces south of the homestead.

The west of the homestead was the working area and included the picking garden and orchard and a modest dam. While structures in this area have been lost, the northern line of European olive trees and 1946 aerial photographs reveal the boundaries of the area. Eileen Cummings (daughter of owner William Pilling) reveals that the orchard was still in use during their 1930 occupation and included fruits and nuts. The space is currently used for grazing.

The large dam built by Warwick Fairfax in c. 1958 was constructed across the boundary of the former picking garden and orchard. The dam has recently been removed in preparation for the residential subdivision and new spine road.

=== Homestead Group and entry drive ===
The main homestead group focuses on the east and south with open rural land as its traditional address. The existing entry to Orielton follows the Old Northern Road easement in a north south direction curving sharply to the north west. At this point the drive is bordered by old pines and to the south is Narellan Creek. Towards the homestead group is evidence of previous hedges and remnant gardens formalised to the south. Located west of the main homestead is a dam. An old well structure remains near the top of the north ridge.

The homestead consists of an early building with a large complex of additions. To the east of the main house is the stables and horse agistment area. To the north of the stables is evidence of an earlier garden or entry that orientates to the east.

Additions were made to the house in the late 19th century and it was re-oriented (the original entrance driveway appears to have been from the Northern Road directly passing through the area occupied by farm buildings (today) to the entrance, which was oriented toward Northern Road and facing Crear Hill.

=== Outbuildings ===
- Silos (c.1950)
- Former Miller's Cottage / Office (c. 1850, adapted c. 1950)
- Large Stables (c. 1930, adapted c. 1950)
- Hay Shed (c. 1930, adapted c. 1950)
- Early milking shed (c. 1880)
- Stalls shed (c. 1950–c. 1990)
- Concrete bin (c. 1950, c. 1990)
- Stock Yards (c. 1950)
- Mill Building (3 storeys, no longer extant, c. 1830-1950).

=== Condition ===
As at 24 February 2004, Orielton still retains some of its character based on the traditional juxtaposition of the main homestead area with its dominant garden and cleared pastureland beyond. Orielton has considerable archaeological potential as the property has been a continuously developing site from c. 1815–c. 1940.

Orielton still retains its relationship to the various natural features such as Narellan Creek and the enclosing ridgelines, and its open pastoral landscapes.

=== Modifications and dates ===
- late 19th century – additions when the house was reoriented to face toward Camden. The original entrance driveway appears to have been from the Northern Road directly passing through the area occupied by farm buildings (today) to the entrance, which was oriented toward Northern Road and facing Crear Hill.
- WWII – army occupied the site. It was during this time that substantial change to the fabric of the house occurred.
- c. 1940s – orchards west of homestead neglected and not clear (plantings gone) in aerial photographs of 1946–47.
- c. 1958 – a large dam built by Warwick Fairfax in c. 1958 across the boundary of the former picking garden and orchard.
- c. 1990 – cultivated paddocks south-west of homestead along northern side of Narellan Creek abandoned for grazing. Tracks and cattle shelters no longer apparent in 2005 aerial photograph (cf. 1990 photo).
- pre-2005 – new suburb of Harrington Park east of The Northern Road, including part of Orielton's estate. New roundabout inserted in The Northern Road almost directly east of Orielton homestead. The alignment of The Northern Road adjusted, affecting Orielton's driveway, which is now a 'switchback, from the western side of this roundabout south, doing a "hairpin bend" north of Narellan Creek and approaching the homestead on the same line as the existing driveway.
- pre 2013 – new large lot development approaching Orielton's south-west north of Narellan Creek from Kirkham suburb.
- c. 2013–14 – the levelled portion of land directly east of the carriage loop (former tennis court) was expanded recently, filled with spoil from Roads & Maritime Services road works on the Northern Road.
- 2014 – large dam built c. 1958 recently removed in preparation for the residential subdivision and new spine road.

== Heritage listing ==
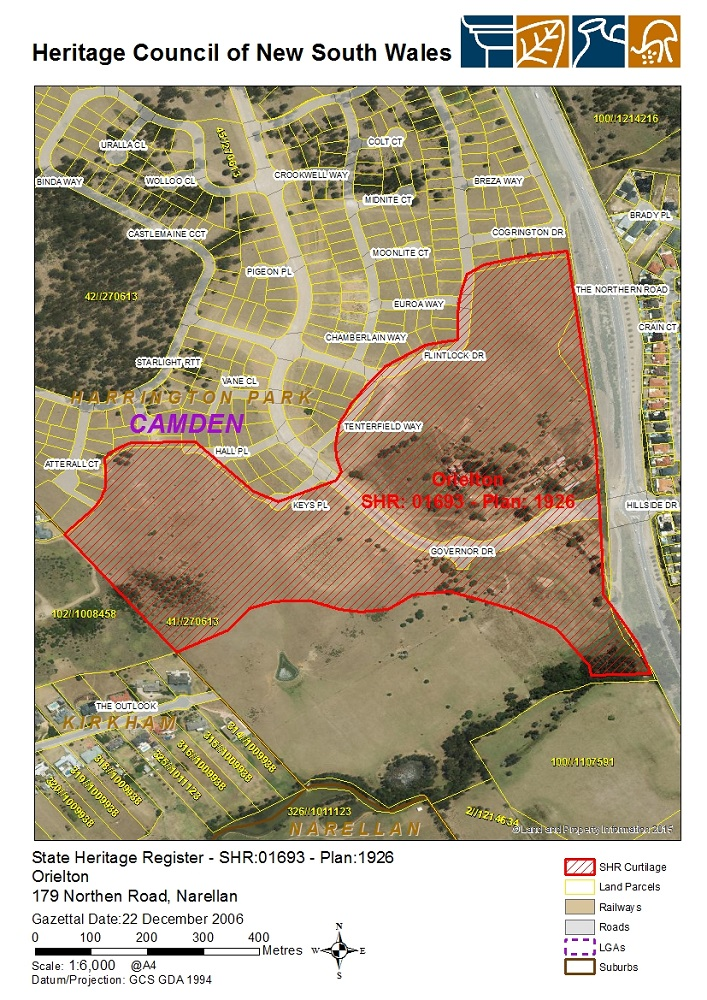
Heritage boundaries

As at 23 February 2004, Orielton is of state heritage significance to the Camden area for the following reasons:

1. Orielton is a good representative example of a gentleman's estate from the 1840s, and possibly as early as the 1820s (granted in 1815);
2. Orielton housed the mill for wheat grown in the area – an important early industry. The continued adaptive reuse of the residence and the outbuildings is an important part of Orielton's history;
3. Orielton in its stages of construction and the arrangement of its buildings and gardens, illustrates the evolution of an upper-class working farm from early colonial times to the present day, with the occupants appreciating the landscape setting;
4. The buildings and grounds, in their periods of construction, illustrate the sequence of design elements as the estate grew since 1815;
5. Orielton homestead represents the layout of a gentleman's estate with views and vistas afforded to and from the homestead over the landscape and important access routes;
6. Orielton has strong associations with prominent land owners and local gentry since its 1840 occupation to the present Fairfax ownership. It has an association with the World War II air force occupation;
7. The buildings and layout of Orielton have the ability to demonstrate past estate development and farming practices particularly for wheat and flour production. Archaeological remains would provide insights into past occupation and use;
8. Orielton is aesthetically significant because it displays elements of Georgian design and detailing which is representative of the area. It also displays Italianate design rare to the area and to rural properties. Orielton's setting in the rural landscape is representative of design philosophies of the time. Its visual links with the landscape and surrounding properties is significant;
9. Orielton's setting in the rural landscape is representative of design philosophies of the time. Its visual links with the landscape and surrounding properties is significant;
10. The gardens surrounding the homestead are significant for retaining plant specimens and garden layouts associated with their early arrangement. The gardens have been arranged to provide a formal garden setting for the homestead, with its signal plantings of Bunya and Norfolk Island pines, providing a distinctive presence of the homestead against the undulating topography.

Individual elements located on the subject site which are considered to be of heritage significance include, but are not limited to, the following:

- Orielton house;
- remnants of the original driveway to The Northern Road;
- remnants of original outbuildings to the north of the site and in the working area;
- views and vistas;
- landscape setting;
- plantings.

Orielton dates from Governor Macquarie's 1815 land grant to Edward Lord. The visually prominent farm complex (c. 1840) is situated on the side of a knoll commanding sweeping views of Narellan and obeying the principles of 18th Century English landscape design. Orielton is considered to be of exceptional significance because of the integrity of its rural setting and the demonstrable functional relationships within the homestead and farm complex. The varied topographical features of Orielton (ridges, knolls and gentle slopes) contribute significantly to the setting and function of the property and its significant visual links with surrounding properties such as Harrington Park and Studley Park, the spire at St John's Church, Cobbitty and The Northern Road.

Orielton outline of significance:

- It still retains its quintessential landscape character – based on the traditional juxtaposition of homestead area, with its dominant garden, and cleared pastureland beyond;
- Its historical relationship to other nearby early grants (Harrington Park, Wivenhoe and Kirkham) and its place in the development of the local area can still be appreciated;
- It has associations with some notable people;
- The place retains its historical local prominence and serves as an important local landmark;
- The place retains some key historical visual relationships – vistas to Harrington Park, Studley Park, the spire of St. John's, Camden and the Razorback Range;
- A relatively intact estate - still able to appreciate the main homestead group in its traditional rural context and in relationship to the various natural features – Narellan Creek and the enclosing ridgelines;
- The place has many features of individual significance such as the original homestead, later homestead, outbuildings, garden layout, terracing and mature plantings and the entry drive from the Northern Road;
- The place has considerable capacity to demonstrate its development from c. 1815 to the present;
- The place is of considerable scientific interest on account of its archaeological research potential.

Orielton was listed on the New South Wales State Heritage Register on 22 December 2006 having satisfied the following criteria.

The place is important in demonstrating the course, or pattern, of cultural or natural history in New South Wales.

Orielton is historically significant as one of the first land grants in the Cowpastures district that still retains its historical relationship to other nearby early grants such as Harrington Park, Wivenhoe and Kirkham. Orielton is an important historical property in the development of the local area.

The place has a strong or special association with a person, or group of persons, of importance of cultural or natural history of New South Wales's history.

Orielton has several historical associations with notable people, especially Edward Lord and more recently the Fairfax family.

The place is important in demonstrating aesthetic characteristics and/or a high degree of creative or technical achievement in New South Wales.

Orielton retains some significant historical visual relationships - vistas to Harrington Park, Studley Park, the spire of St Johns in Camden and the Razorback Range. The landscape character can still be appreciated based on the traditional juxtaposition of the homestead area, with its dominant garden and cleared pastureland beyond.

The place has a strong or special association with a particular community or cultural group in New South Wales for social, cultural or spiritual reasons.

Orielton's historical relationship to other nearby early grants such as Harrington Park, Wivenhoe and Kirkham and its place in the development of the Camden area are locally significant. Orielton retains its historical local prominence and serves as an important local landmark.

The place has potential to yield information that will contribute to an understanding of the cultural or natural history of New South Wales.

Orielton has considerable technical/research significance for its capacity to demonstrate its development from 1815 to the present. The homestead site in particular has high research significance for its continuous architectural evolution, including the impact of World War Two in the region.

The place possesses uncommon, rare or endangered aspects of the cultural or natural history of New South Wales.

Orielton is rare as a relatively intact estate with its main homestead group still in its traditional rural context.

The place is important in demonstrating the principal characteristics of a class of cultural or natural places/environments in New South Wales.

Orielton Estate is representative of past land uses of agricultural cropping, pasture improvement and recreation pursuits that reflect the emergence of Sydney's new middle class during the 19th century. The estate, much like neighboring Oran Park and Harrington Park is representative of Crown grants, subdivision patterns, ownership patterns and grazier's homesteads

== See also ==
- Australian residential architectural styles
