= Studley Park =

Studley Park may refer to:

- Studley Park, Narellan, Sydney
- Yarra Bend Park, Melbourne
