= Camden Council (New South Wales) =

- Local government area
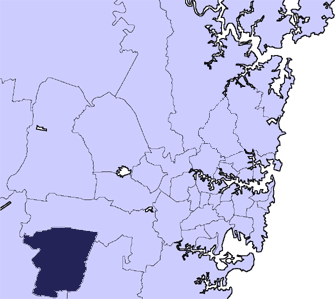
- Location in Metropolitan Sydney

- Interactive map of Camden Council
- Coordinates: 34°03′S 150°42′E
- Country: Australia
- State: New South Wales
- Region: Greater Western Sydney
- Established: 6 February 1889
- Council seat: Oran Park

Government
  - Mayor: Vince Ferreri (Libertarian Party (Australia))
  - State electorates: Badgerys Creek; Camden; Campbelltown; Leppington
  - Federal divisions: Hume; Macarthur

Area
  - Total: 201 km^{2} (78 sq mi)

Population
  - Total: 119,325 (2021 census)
  - Density: 593.7/km^{2} (1,538/sq mi)
- Website: Camden Council
LGAs around Camden Council
Wollondilly	Liverpool	Liverpool
Wollondilly	Camden Council	Campbelltown
Wollondilly	Wollondilly	Campbelltown

Camden Council is a local government area in the Macarthur region of Sydney, in the state of New South Wales, Australia. The area is located south west of the Sydney central business district and comprises 201 square kilometres (78 sq mi) with an estimated population at the 2021 census of 119,325. The mayor of Camden is Vince Ferreri, a member of the Libertarian Party.

== Suburbs in the local government area ==
Suburbs serviced by Camden Council are:

- Bickley Vale
- Camden
- Camden South
- Catherine Field
- Cobbitty
- Currans Hill
- Elderslie
- Ellis Lane
- Gledswood Hills
- Grasmere
- Gregory Hills
- Harrington Park
- Kirkham
- Leppington
- Mount Annan
- Narellan
- Narellan Vale
- Oran Park
- Smeaton Grange
- Spring Farm

== Demographics ==
At the 2021 census there were 119,325 people in the Camden local government area, of these 49.1 per cent were male and 50.9 per cents were female. Aboriginal and Torres Strait Islander people made up 3.2 per cent of the population; similar to the NSW and Australian averages of 3.4 and 3.2 per cent respectively. The median age of people in the Camden Council area was 33 years, which is significantly lower than the national median of 38 years. Children aged 0 – 14 years made up 25.3 per cent of the population and people aged 65 years and over made up 9.9 per cent of the population. Of people in the area aged 15 years and over, 54.0 per cent were married and 10.9 per cent were either divorced or separated.

Population growth in the Camden Council area between the 2001 census and the 2006 census was 13.35 per cent; in the subsequent five years to the 2011 census, population growth was 14.25 per cent. At the 2016 census, the population in the Camden local government area increased by 37.9 per cent. When compared with total population growth of Australia for the same period, being 8.8 per cent, population growth in Camden local government area was in excess of four times the national average. The median weekly income for residents within the Camden Council area was generally slightly higher than the national average.

At the 2021 census, the proportion of residents in the Camden local government area who stated their ancestry as Australian or Anglo-Saxon approached 70% of all residents. In excess of 58.0% of residents in the Camden Council area nominated a religious affiliation with Christianity at the 2021 census, compared with the national average of 43.9%; and the proportion of residents with no religion was about half the national average. Meanwhile, as at the 2021 census date, compared to the national average, households in the Camden local government area had a slighter higher proportion (22.5 per cent) where two or more languages are spoken (national average was 22.3 per cent); and had a similar proportion (74.0 per cent) where English only was spoken at home (national average was 72.0 per cent).

Selected historical census data for Camden local government area
Census year		2001	2006	2011	2016	2021
Population	Estimated residents on census night	43,799	▲49,645	▲56,720	▲78,218	▲119,325
Population	LGA rank in terms of size within New South Wales			39th	▲28th	▲24th
Population	% of New South Wales population			0.82%	▲1.05%	▲1.48%
Population	% of Australian population	0.23%	▲0.25%	▲0.26%	▲0.33%	▲0.47%
Median weekly incomes						
Personal income	Median weekly personal income		A$566	A$690	A$821	A$984
Personal income	% of Australian median income		121.5%	119.6%	124.0%	122.2%
Family income	Median weekly family income		A$1,353	A$1,865	A$2,161	A$2,487
Family income	% of Australian median income		131.7%	125.9%	124.6%	117.3%
Household income	Median weekly household income		A$1,465	A$1,727	A$2,047	A$2,353
Household income	% of Australian median income		125.1%	140.0%	142.4%	134.8%

Selected historical census data for Camden local government area
Ancestry, top responses
2001		2006		2011		2016		2021	
No Data		No Data		Australian	31.1%	Australian	▼27.0%	Australian	▲32.7%
No Data		No Data		English	27.2%	English	▼25.1%	English	▲28.9%
No Data		No Data		Irish	7.2%	Irish	▲7.4%	Irish	▲7.6%
No Data		No Data		Scottish	6.1%	Scottish	▼6.0%	Italian	▲7.4%
No Data		No Data		Italian	4.6%	Italian	▲5.0%	Scottish	▲6.7%
Country of birth, top responses
2001		2006		2011		2016		2021	
Australia	79.8%	Australia	79.8%	Australia	▲80.2%	Australia	▼77.4%	Australia	▼74.1%
England	4.9%	England	▼4.3%	England	▼4.0%	England	▼3.1%	India	▲2.4%
New Zealand	1.3%	New Zealand	▼1.0%	New Zealand	▲1.1%	New Zealand	▲1.3%	England	▼2.3%
Italy	0.9%	Italy	0.9%	Italy	0.9%	India	▲0.9%	New Zealand	▲1.5%
Scotland	0.9%	Scotland	▼0.8%	Scotland	0.8%	Philippines	▲0.7%	Philippines	▲1.3%
China	0.5%	China	0.5%	China	0.5%	Fiji	▲0.7%	Iraq	▲1.1%
Language, top responses (other than English)
2001		2006		2011		2016		2021	
Italian	1.7%	Italian	▼1.6%	Italian	▼1.5%	Arabic	▲1.4%	Arabic	▲2.3%
Spanish	0.7%	Spanish	▲0.8%	Spanish	▲0.9%	Italian	▼1.3%	Spanish	▲1.6%
Cantonese	0.7%	Arabic	▲0.7%	Arabic	▲0.8%	Spanish	▲1.3%	Hindi	▲1.5%
Arabic	0.6%	Cantonese	0.7%	Cantonese	▼0.6%	Hindi	▲0.9%	Punjabi	▲1.1%
Maltese	0.5%	Croatian	0.5%	Maltese	▼0.4%	Mandarin	▲0.7%	Italian	▼1.1%
Religious affiliation, top responses
2001		2006		2011		2016		2021	
Catholic	33.5%	Catholic	▲34.7%	Catholic	▲35.4%	Catholic	▼34.4%	Catholic	▼31.7%
Anglican	30.9%	Anglican	▼29.1%	Anglican	▼28.3%	Anglican	▼21.4%	No Religion	▲25.1%
No Religion	9.6%	No Religion	▲11.3%	No Religion	▲12.9%	No Religion	▲18.9%	Anglican	▼13.9%
United Church	4.8%	United Church	▼4.0%	United Church	▼3.5%	Not Stated	▲6.6%	Islam	▲4.8%
Presbyterian and Reformed	3.0%	Presbyterian and Reformed	▼2.6%	Presbyterian and Reformed	▼2.4%	Uniting Church	▼2.4%	Not Stated	▼4.3%

== Council ==
=== Current composition and election method ===
Camden Council is composed of nine councillors elected proportionally as three separate wards, each electing three councillors. All councillors are elected for a fixed four-year term of office. The mayor is elected by the councillors at the first meeting of the council. The most recent election was held on 14 September 2024, and the makeup of the council is as follows:

Party	Councillors
Labor	3
Independents	3
Libertarian	2
Liberal Party	1
Total	9

The current Council, elected in 2024, by ward, is:

Ward	Councillor	Party	Notes
Central Ward	Therese Fedeli	Liberal	
Central Ward	Ashleigh Cagney	Labor	
Central Ward	Peter McLean	Independent	
North Ward	Abha Suri	Independent	
North Ward	Eliza Rahman	Labor	Deputy Mayor
North Ward	Vince Ferreri	Libertarian	Mayor
South Ward	Eva Campbell	Independent	
South Ward	Damien Quinnell	Labor	
South Ward	Rose Sicari	Libertarian	

== Election results ==
=== 2024 ===
2024 Camden Council election: Ward results
Party	Votes	%	Swing	Seats	Change
Labor	20,054	29.7	−3.3	3	Steady
Independents	18,491	27.3	+4.8	3	▲1
Libertarian	16,448	24.3	+24.3	2	▲2
Liberal	8,378	12.4	−31.6	1	▼3
Camden Community First	3,677	5.4	+5.4	0	Steady
Shooters, Fishers and Farmers	568	0.8	+0.3	0	Steady
Formal votes	67,616	90.5			
Informal votes	7,115	9.5			
Total	74,731	100.0		9	
Registered voters / turnout	87,311	85.6			

=== 2021 ===
2021 New South Wales local elections: Camden
Party	Votes	%	Swing	Seats	Change
Liberal	27,148	44.0	+12.0	4	Steady
Labor	20,351	33.0	+8.0	3	Steady
Independent	13,913	22.5	−20.5	2	Steady
Shooters, Fishers and Farmers	314	0.5	+0.5	0	Steady
Formal votes	61,726	94.58			
Informal votes	3,537	5.42			
Total	65,263	100.0			

== Mayors from 1889 to present ==
#	Mayor	Term start	Term end	Time in office	Notes
1	Frederick Burne	24 April 1889	1891	2 years, 0 days	
2	Charles Whiteman	1892	1893	2 years, 0 days	
3	Henry Reeves	1894	1894	1 year, 0 days	
4	James Noakes	1895	October 1895 (res)	273 days	
5	James Rankin	23 October 1895	4 May 1896 (res)	194 days	
6	W.C. Furner	4 May 1896	14 February 1899	2 years, 286 days	
7	George Furner	14 February 1899	13 February 1901	1 year, 364 days	
8	E.F. Druitt	13 February 1901	12 February 1902	364 days	
9	George Macarthur Onslow	12 February 1902	10 February 1904	1 year, 363 days	
10	A.D. Little	10 February 1904	12 February 1906	2 years, 2 days	
−	George Macarthur Onslow	12 February 1906	1 March 1907	1 year, 17 days	
−	George Furner	1 March 1907	1 March 1909	2 years, 0 days	
−	George Macarthur Onslow	1 March 1909	1 March 1910	1 year, 0 days	
−	George Furner	1 March 1910	7 February 1911 (res)	343 days	
−	George Furner (acting)	7 February 1911	1 March 1911	22 days	
11	Thomas Sheil	1 March 1911	1 March 1913	2 years, 0 days	
12	R.E. Young	1 March 1913	19 January 1915 (ret)	1 year, 324 days	
−	George Furner	19 January 1915	10 July 1917	2 years, 172 days	
13	W.F. Peters	10 July 1917	1 March 1918	234 days	
−	George Furner	1 March 1918	15 December 1925	7 years, 289 days	
14	Francis Macarthur Onslow	15 December 1925	11 December 1928	2 years, 362 days	
15	William Larkin	11 December 1928	12 December 1932	4 years, 1 day	
16	Robert Crookston	12 December 1932	11 December 1933	364 days	
−	William Larkin	11 December 1933	19 December 1938	5 years, 8 days	
17	Horace (Stan) Kelloway	19 December 1938	14 December 1954	15 years, 360 days	
18	William Cruikshank	14 December 1954	1962	8 years, 0 days	
19	G.T. Griffiths	1962	1964	2 years, 0 days	
20	R.B. (Bruce) Ferguson	1964	1977	13 years, 0 days	
21	Grahame Bush	1977	1980	3 years, 0 days	
22	Elizabeth (Liz) Kernohan	1980	1981	1 year, 0 days	
−	Grahame Bush	1981	1982	1 year, 0 days	
23	L.A. (Don) Duncombe	1982	1983	1 year, 0 days	
24	Warren Eggins	1983	1985	2 years, 0 days	
−	Elizabeth (Liz) Kernohan	1985	1991	6 years, 0 days	
25	Theresa Testoni	1991	27 September 1993	2 years, 26 days	
26	Frank Brooking	27 September 1993	1997	3 years, 339 days	
27	Geoff Corrigan	1998	1999	1 year, 0 days	
28	Eva Campbell	1999	2001	2 years, 0 days	
–	Geoff Corrigan	2001	2003	2 years, 0 days	
29	Fred Anderson	2003	September 2006	3 years, 0 days	
30	Chris Patterson	September 2006	14 June 2011	4 years, 286 days	
31	Greg Warren	14 June 2011	9 October 2012	1 year, 12 days	
32	Lara Symkowiak	9 October 2012	11 September 2018	5 years, 337 days	
33	Peter Sidgreaves	11 September 2018	23 April 2019	224 days	
34	Therese Fedeli	23 April 2019	9 May 2023	4 years, 16 days	
35	Ashleigh Cagney	9 May 2023	15 October 2025	2 years, 157 days	
−	Therese Fedeli	15 October 2025	8 September 2026	328 Days	
36	Vince Ferreri	8 September 2026	Present	Incumbent	

== Urban development ==
In Camden Council area there were 2,168 residential buildings approved to be built in the financial year 2021–22. Being a significant part of the South-Western Sydney Growth Area, Camden Council represents a rapidly growing region which is expected to house a large portion of Sydney's population growth over the coming decade. To the north are residential developments including Oran Park (8,000 homes) and Gregory Hills (2,600 homes), whilst to the south are further developments of the Elderslie estate.

A Muslim group, the Quranic Society, made a development application in the Camden area for an A$19 million Muslim school with the capacity for 1,200 students. In May 2008 the Council voted unanimously to reject the application. After reducing its proposal to a school catering for 900 students, the Quranic Society took its case to the Land and Environment Court. The application was met with significant community protest; and the application rejected by the Court on the grounds that the land chosen was suited to rural uses.

=== Waste management ===
The Spring Farm Resource Recovery Park at Spring Farm processes household waste from the Campbelltown City Council, Camden Council, Wollondilly Shire Council and Wingecarribee Shire Council areas. The site includes a materials recycling facility for sorting kerbside recyclables and recovering reusable materials. General waste and garden organics are temporarily stored before being transferred to landfill and commercial composting facilities, respectively.

== Heritage listings ==
The Camden Council has a number of heritage sites, including:

- Camden, 135 Argyle Street: Camden Post Office
- Camden, Aerodrome Road, Cobbitty: Macquarie Grove
- Camden, Exeter Street: Nant Gwylan and Garden
- Camden South, Elizabeth Macarthur Avenue: Camden Park Estate and Belgenny Farm
- Catherine Field, 1025 Camden Valley Way: Raby, Catherine Field
- Cobbitty, 421 The Northern Road: Denbigh, Cobbitty
- Gledswood Hills, 900 Camden Valley Way: Gledswood
- Harrington Park, 1 Hickson Circuit: Harrington Park (homestead)
- Harrington Park, 181–183 Northern Road: Orielton
- Narellan, Camden Valley Way: Studley Park, Narellan
- Narellan, Kirkham Lane: Camelot, Kirkham
- Narellan, Kirkham Lane: Kirkham Stables
- Oran Park, 112–130 Oran Park Drive: Oran Park (homestead)

== See also ==
- Local government areas of New South Wales
