= Oran Park, New South Wales =

Oran Park
- Suburb
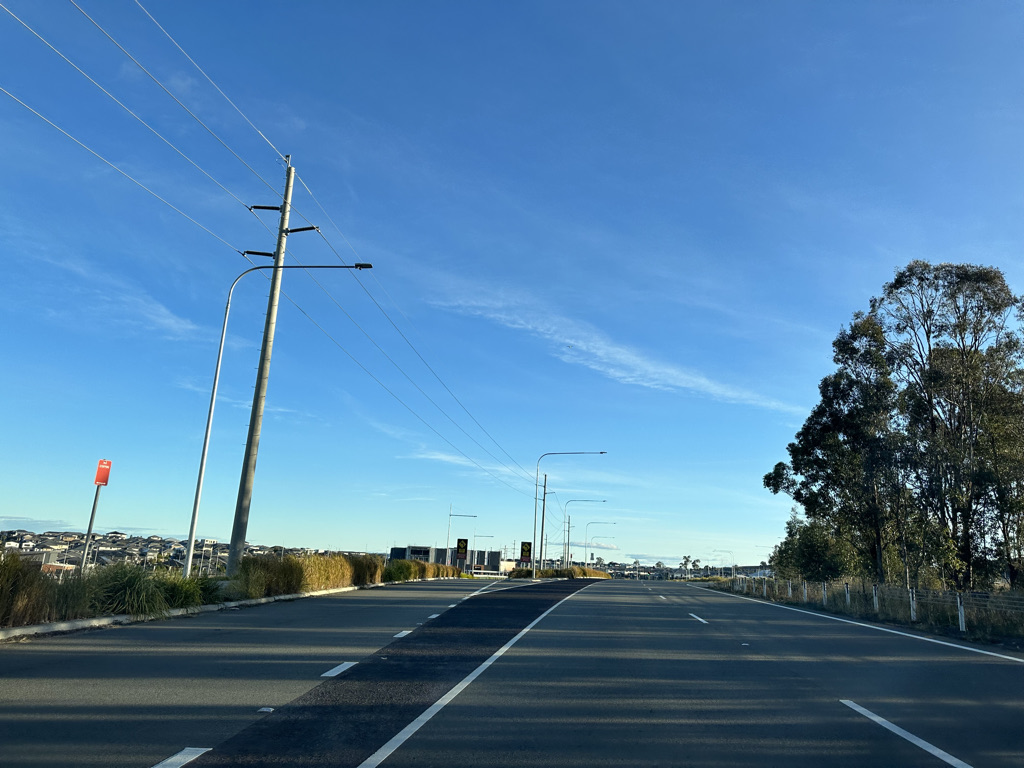

- Interactive map of Oran Park
- Coordinates: 34°00′11″S 150°44′35″E
- Country: Australia
- State: New South Wales
- City: Sydney
- LGA: Camden Council
- Location: 59 km (37 mi) from Sydney CBD

Government
  - State electorate: Badgerys Creek
  - Federal division: Hume
- Elevation: 92 m (302 ft)

Population
  - Total: 17,624 (2021 census)
- Postcode: 2570
Suburbs around Oran Park
Bringelly	Bringelly	Rossmore
Cobbitty	Oran Park	Catherine Field
Harrington Park	Harrington Park	Gledswood Hills

Oran Park is a suburb in the Macarthur Region of South Western Sydney in the state of New South Wales, Australia. Oran Park is located in the local government area of Camden Council, 59 kilometres south-west of the Sydney central business district. The suburb is often cited as an example of urban sprawl.

== History ==
The area now known as Oran Park was originally home to the Dharawal people. In 1805, John Macarthur established his property at Camden where he raised merino sheep.

The locality was part of Nepean Shire Council until 1948, at which time the shire council was split up between Penrith, Liverpool and Camden Councils. Oran Park was part of the shire's C Riding and was amalgamated with Camden Municipal Council.

The Oran Park Town housing development replaced Oran Park Raceway, which stood from 1962 – 2010. The circuit hosted the Australian Grand Prix in its pre-Formula One era and rounds of the Australian Touring Car Championship, later known as the Supercars Championship.

These urban fringe-dwellers have been recently joined by developer corporations selling dreams to new suburbanites who live in streets named after motor racing celebrities.

== Heritage listings ==
Oran Park has a number of heritage-listed sites, including:

- 112-130 Oran Park Drive: Oran Park (homestead)

== Commercial area ==
Oran Park has a shopping centre named Oran Park Podium, which opened in September 2014 and has since been renovated and enlarged in 2024.

== Transportation ==
The main public transport is 858 bus to Leppington railway station.

== Population ==
According to the 2021 census, there were 17,624 residents in Oran Park. 62.2% of residents were born in Australia. 56.4% of residents spoke only English at home. Other languages spoken at home included Punjabi 3.8%, Hindi 2.9%, Nepali 2.7% and Spanish 2.3%, The most common responses for religious affiliation were Catholic 28.9%, No Religion 19.8%, Hinduism 9.7%, and Anglican 8.3%. Top ancestries include Australian (23%), English (18.8%), Indian (8.8%), Italian (6.9%) and Irish (4.3%).

== Governance ==
Oran Park is part of the north ward of Camden Council represented by Cindy Cagney, Usha Dommaraju and Lara Symkowiak as of December 2021. The suburb is contained within the federal electorate of Hume, represented by Angus Taylor of the Liberal Party, and the state electorate of Badgerys Creek, currently held by Tanya Davies of the Liberal Party.
