= Nant Gwylan and Garden =

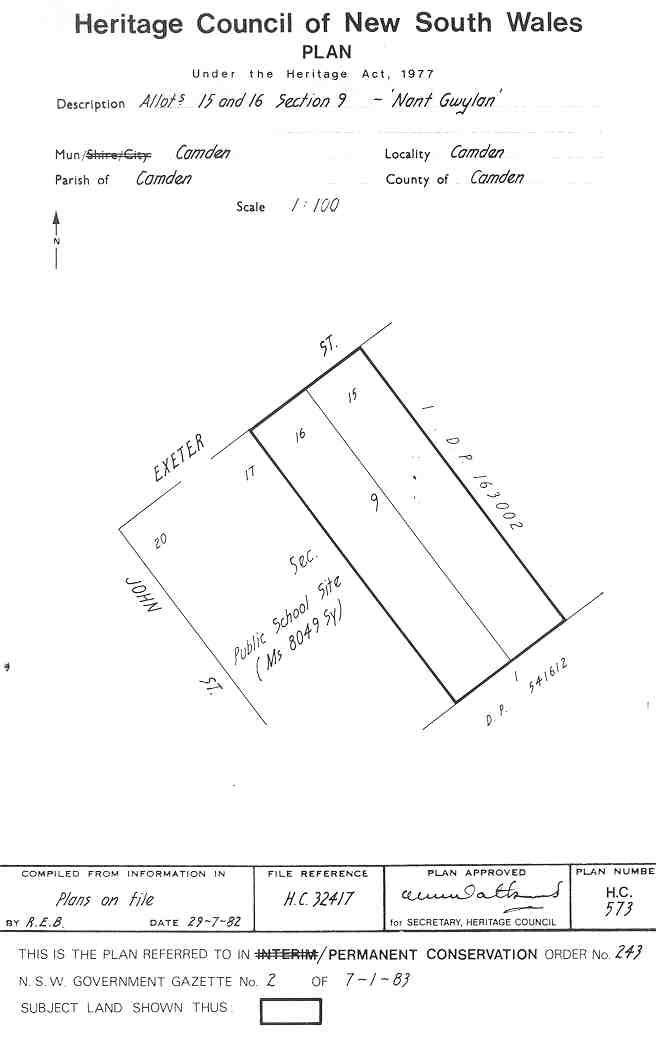
- Heritage boundaries

- Location within Sydney Location within Australia
- 34°03′03″S 150°41′43″E
- Location: Exeter Street, Camden, Camden Council, New South Wales, Australia

New South Wales Heritage Register
- Official name: Nant Gwylan and Garden
- Type: State heritage (complex / group)
- Designated: 2 April 1999
- Reference no.: 243
- Type: Garden Residential
- Category: Parks, Gardens and Trees

Nant Gwylan and Garden is a heritage-listed residential garden at Exeter Street in the south-western Sydney suburb of Camden in the Camden Council local government area of New South Wales, Australia. It was added to the New South Wales State Heritage Register on 2 April 1999.

== Heritage listing ==
As at 5 January 2006, Nant Gwylan, built c. 1905 by John Peat, a Camden bricklayer of note, is an intact Edwardian house and outbuilding set in a cottage garden of the same period. Occupied for more than 90 years by the Davies family, the garden has been little altered from its inception until recent times, while the house has organically evolved over time with pavilion additions and enclosed verandas. Long-time custodian of the house and garden, Miss Llewella Davies, OAM was recognised for her services to the Camden community with a key to the town in 1999. Nant Gwylan maintains a visual relationship with the farmland lying opposite, which was associated with the Davies family from 1908 to 2000, and was donated to the town through the will of Miss Davies.

Nant Gwylan and Garden was listed on the New South Wales State Heritage Register on 2 April 1999.
