= Oran Park (homestead) =

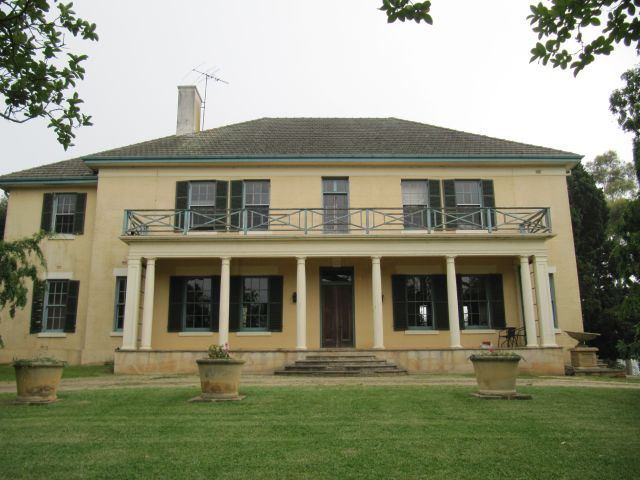

- Location within Sydney Location within Australia
- 34°00′38″S 150°44′55″E
- Location: 112–130 Oran Park Drive, Oran Park, Camden Council, New South Wales, Australia

History
- Built: 1837–1946

Site notes
- Architectural styles: Victorian Italianate; Georgian Revival

New South Wales Heritage Register
- Official name: Oran Park; Catherine Park House
- Type: State heritage (complex / group)
- Designated: 5 March 2015
- Reference no.: 1695
- Type: Homestead Complex
- Category: Farming and Grazing

Oran Park is a heritage-listed former golf course, private residence and golf clubhouse and now private residence located at 112–130 Oran Park Drive in the south-western Sydney suburb of Oran Park in the Camden Council local government area of New South Wales, Australia. It was built from 1837 to 1946. It is sometimes referred to as Catherine Park House due to a land subdivision of Catherine Fields, however "Catherine Park" is only a developer's name for the area and not a true suburb. The property is privately owned. It was added to the New South Wales State Heritage Register on 5 March 2015.

== History ==
After settling at Sydney Cove in 1788, the First Fleet soon found the soil unsuitable for farming and looked for more fertile soils beyond the established boundaries of the colony. By 1795, the settlers had journeyed to the Cumberland Plain (to the west) and discovered the rich land of the Cowpastures, named after the discovery of a herd of wild cows that had escaped the colony years earlier and wandered west, grazing the land now known as the Camden district.

Following the discovery of the area, the colonial gentry soon regarded it as rich, fertile and suitable land for livestock grazing and pastoral pursuits. The low rambling hills and wide expanses of grass flats were devoid of difficult vegetation and reminded the colonists of the familiar landscape of an English gentleman's park. This environment was considered ideal for the establishment of the wealthy estates so desired by the colonial gentry.

Quickly, the acquisition of land in the district was being sought by private colonists. The newly appointed governor, Lachlan Macquarie, soon had the land surveyed and began granting land allotments to the colonial elite.

In 1815, Governor Macquarie granted an 809-hectare (2,000-acre) parcel of land to Captain William Douglas Campbell, a member of the British merchant navy, who named the estate Harrington Park. The land on which Oran Park house now resides was, during Campbell's time, open cleared land for pastoral cultivation and livestock grazing.

Upon Campbell's death in 1827, Harrington Park underwent the first of many land subdivisions. One thousand acres was transferred to Campbell's nephew, John Douglas Campbell, who commenced construction of a dwelling house and associated outbuildings (the existing coach house dates from c. 1837). Although the buildings were incomplete, Campbell leased the property in 1839 to Henry Keck Esq., Governor of Darlinghurst Gaol, who (as an agreement of the lease) was to continue with and finalise the construction of Oran Park house.

In 1842, the lease was transferred to Henry William Johnson who took out two mortgages on the property. It is assumed that the first was to purchase 324 hectares (800 acres) of land and the buildings and the second was to finalise the construction of Oran Park house (c. 1865). Johnson lived at Oran Park until 1867 when he defaulted on his mortgages and was foreclosed on by Thomas Barker who took possession of the property. It is alleged that, following this, the shamed Johnson leapt to his death from the roof of Oran Park house.

By 1871, when Oran Park was sold to Edward Lomas Moore, the house was in poor condition. A wealthy grazier and one of the largest landowners in the Campbelltown district, Moore lived at Oran Park with his wife Anne and large family (of some 12 or so children) until the construction of the nearby Badgally house was complete. When the family moved in 1882, Moore leased the imposing two-storey Oran Park house (with wrap-around verandahs, rear basement, octagonal tower and established gardens) to Thomas Cadell who operated the property as a dairy farm.

Upon Moore's death in 1887, and after years of the contention of his will, the ownership of the Oran Park property finally passed to his younger son Essington Moore in 1907 who initially leased the property before returning from England in the 1930s to make Oran Park his permanent home. Oran Park house underwent some changes during the Moore period (the roof was reconfigured and the lantern removed) but, upon his sudden death in 1937, the property was sold to Hubert Harry Robbins who had grand intentions to develop Oran Park as his family's country retreat. Much of the significant modifications to Oran Park house are attributed to Robbins who converted the Victorian Italianate house into a Georgian Revival style.

After Robbins death in 1945, Oran Park was sold to Daniel James Cleary (who established the Oran Park Raceway, west of the property), sold again to Sydney merchants Arthur Raymond Booth and Robert Leslie Booth later in 1946 and then again to Camden farmer John Thomas Vivian Frost in 1947. Frost continued the farming use of the property until 1960 when it was then sold to Cobbitty Investments Pty Ltd for subdivision into hobby farms. Sold again in 1961, Oran Park became the property of Edward Star, a hotel proprietor from Sydney's eastern suburbs, who developed the property and established a trotting track, 18-hole golf course and function centre. During this time, Oran Park house was used as the golf clubhouse.

After another failed development attempt and a succession of different owners, Oran Park was purchased in 1969 by the Honourable Lionel John Charles Seymour Dawson-Damer. An engineer and motor racing enthusiast in Australia and internationally, Dawson-Damer was attracted to the property because of its close proximity to the Oran Park Raceway and was said to house his historic car collection in the stables and outbuildings of the Oran Park property.

In a dilapidated state upon the purchase, Dawson-Damer and his wife, Ashley, set about restoring the house and outbuildings (including coach house), re-establishing the gardens and reinstating the former historic driveway to Cobbitty Road (now Oran Park Drive). John Dawson-Damer was killed in a racing accident in 2002 and the ownership of Oran Park has since exchanged hands a number of times. Currently owned by Hixon Pty Ltd (as of August 2013), Oran Park is the subject of the Catherine Fields (Part) Precinct land release area.

In the mid-2010s, the driveway was shortened to Seidler Parade, a local street within the Oran Park development, and is no longer accessible directly to/from Oran Park Drive.

== Description ==
=== Site and setting ===
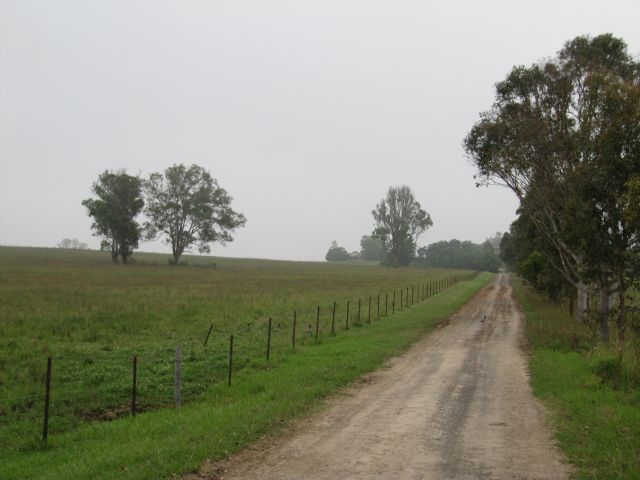
Long driveway

Approached up a long straight driveway from Oran Park Drive and terminating in a formal carriage loop, Oran Park house is positioned on a prominent natural knoll surrounded by open paddocks and rural landscape. Its siting in the landscape makes Oran Park house a visually dominant structure and affords it views from and towards the surrounding historic estates.

The Oran Park property retains the main house, coach house, silo, gardens, paddocks and driveways.

=== Driveways ===
Two driveways mark changes in access to Oran Park house over time. The older driveway runs on a diagonal from south-east to north-west, from close to the corner of the former Cow Pasture Road (now Camden Valley Way) to the homestead. This was lined in the 1920s with inter-planted avenue of South African yellowwood / outeniqua (Afrocarpus falcatus) and native Port Jackson cypress pine (Callitris rhomboidea).

The other driveway runs south–north off former Cobbitty Road (now Oran Park Drive) to the homestead. This was lined in part in the mid-late 20th century with a mixture of eucalypt species. Existing eucalypts (mature in 1947) west of this western, newer driveway.

=== Garden ===
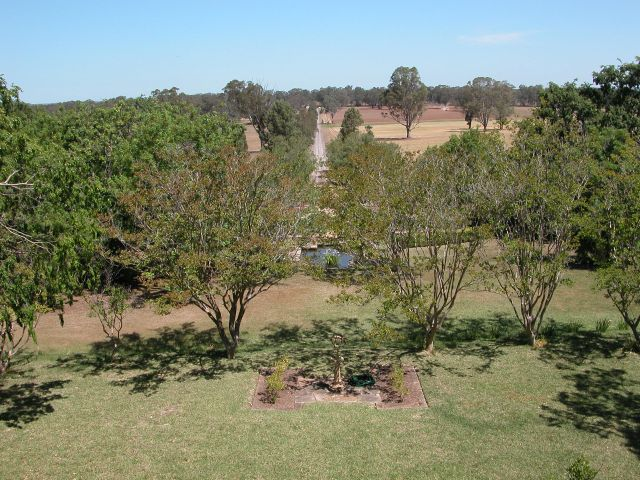
Driveway and gardens

The homestead is surrounded by a large country garden, chiefly lawns with scattered shrubberies and specimen trees. Some trees are mature and date either to the Victorian or Edwardian eras, such as a bunya-bunya pine (Araucaria bidwillii) and Mediterranean cypress (Cupressus sempervirens) and white cedar trees (Melia azederach var. australasica). Also prominent are old Brazilian peppercorn trees (Schinus molle var. areira);

A 20th century planting south-west of the house is hoop pine (A.cunninghamii). Also prominent are maturing Chinese elms (Ulmus parvifolia). Much of the garden around the house reflects mid-late 20th century plantings and replantings made by the Dawson-Damers. These include Cape chestnut (Cupania capensis). Garden shrubs include a hedge of mature Cape honeysuckle/tecoma (Tecomaria capensis), South African wintersweet/ dune poison bush (Acokanthera oppositifolia), climbing/hairy aloe (Aloe ciliata), African boxthorn (Lycium ferocissimum) (a popular hedge species) and geraniums (Pelargonium x hortorum cv's). A kitchen garden area is to the west of the house, flanked by Cape honeysuckle hedging and fences.

=== Homestead ===
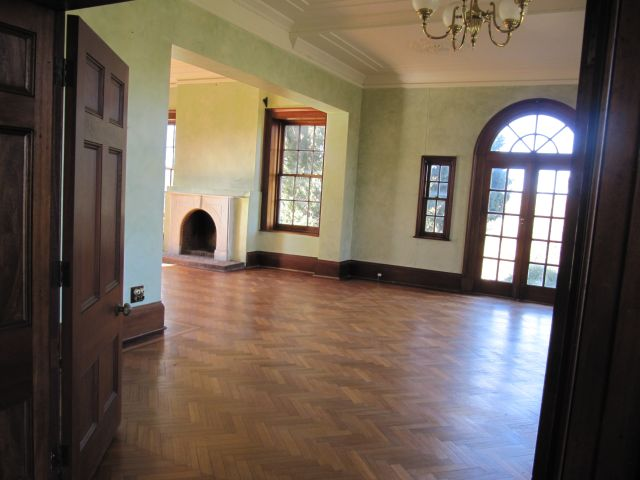
Homestead interiors

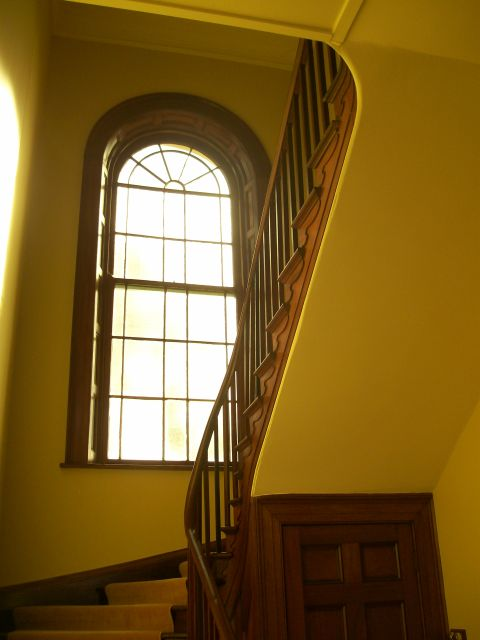
Staircase

Oran Park is a two-storey residential dwelling with rear wing. Originally constructed in the Victorian Italianate style, the house underwent significant modifications in the Inter-War period and now has a Georgian Revival appearance. At the rear of the house, the courtyard is enclosed by masonry walls. A well or cistern is beneath the paving of the rear courtyard. A caretaker's cottage is located to the rear of Oran Park house.

=== Coach House ===
The coach house, located to the east of the main house, is a single storey (originally two storey) building constructed of the same sandstock bricks as Oran Park house.

=== Condition ===
Oran Park house is in generally good condition. On-site caretakers provide ongoing maintenance and security for the house.

The original form of Oran Park house has changed significantly due to alterations, additions and intervention throughout its history. The Inter-War development of the house, to give it a Georgian Revival appearance, has compromised the integrity of the house.

Although some original fabric and features remain extant, the consistent evolution and modification of the house has also compromised the original intactness of its fabric.

The site (house, outbuildings and grounds) now has a layering of fabric which, although not originally intact, does demonstrate the evolution of the site and its use over time.

=== Modifications and dates ===
- 1907–37 – Essington Moore undertook some modifications on Oran Park house, including reconfiguring the roof and removing the lantern in the 1930s.
- 1937–45 – Hubert Harry Robbins undertook significant alterations and additions at Oran Park House and converted the Victorian Italianate house into a Georgian Revival style building. The rear basement was converted to a garage.
- 1960 – Oran Park converted into 26 hobby farms.
- 1961 – Trotting track and 18-hole golf course established. Oran Park house converted to gold clubhouse.
- 1969 – John Dawson-Damer restored Oran Park house and coach house and reinstated historic driveway to Cobbitty Road (now Oran Park Drive). Constructed swimming pool to west of house.
- 1990 – Further renovations undertaken by the Dawson-Damer family.

== Heritage listing ==
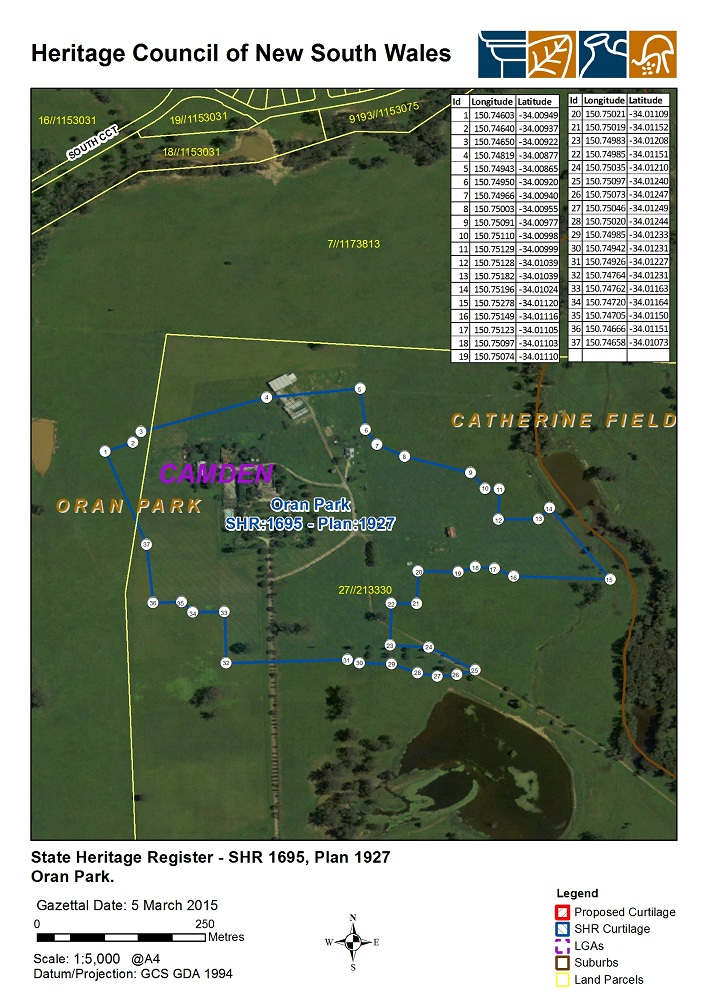
Heritage boundaries

As at 28 June 2007, Oran Park is of state heritage significance as an early surviving cultural landscape in NSW. Part of a 809-hectare (2,000-acre) land grant, awarded by Governor Lachlan Macquarie to William Douglas Campbell in 1815, Oran Park represents the colonial development of the Cowpastures district in the early to mid-19th century and demonstrates the emergence of country estates for the prominent and wealthy members of the colony.

Oran Park retains a number of layers of fabric that demonstrates the evolution of the property and its use over the last two centuries.

Oran Park is of state heritage significance for its association with a number of prominent people, including: William Douglas Campbell (recipient of original grant and owner of Harrington Park, 1815–27), Edward Lomas Moore (wealthy grazier and large landholder in Campbelltown district, 1871–82) and the Honourable John Dawson-Damer (engineer and motor racing enthusiast, 1969–2002).

Oran Park was listed on the New South Wales State Heritage Register on 5 March 2015 having satisfied the following criteria.

The place is important in demonstrating the course, or pattern, of cultural or natural history in New South Wales.

Oran Park is of state heritage significance as an early surviving cultural landscape in NSW. Part of a 809-hectare (2,000-acre) land grant, awarded by Governor Lachlan Macquarie to William Douglas Campbell in 1815, Oran Park represents the colonial development of the Cowpastures district in the early to mid-19th century and demonstrates the emergence of country estates for the prominent and wealthy members of the colony.

Established in the early 19th century (the coach house dating from c. 1837), Oran Park estate and house contains various layers of fabric that demonstrate the evolution, development and changing taste and use of the property over the past two centuries. Originally constructed in the Victorian Italianate style, the house underwent significant modifications in the Inter-War period and now has a Georgian Revival appearance.

Oran Park is of state heritage significance for its association with a number of prominent people, including: William Douglas Campbell (recipient of original grant and owner of Harrington Park, 1815–27), Edward Lomas Moore (wealthy grazier and large landholder in Campbelltown district, 1871–82) and the Honourable John Dawson-Damer (engineer and motor racing enthusiast, 1969–2002).

The place has a strong or special association with a person, or group of persons, of importance of cultural or natural history of New South Wales's history.

Oran Park is of state heritage significance for its association with a number of prominent people, including members of the colonial ruling class of NSW in the 19th century.

The Oran Park property was originally part of a 2000-acre land grant, awarded by Governor Lachlan Macquarie to William Douglas Campbell in 1815. Campbell was a prominent colonist and member of the British merchant navy who named the property Harrington Park and used that land, on which Oran Park now resides, as open cleared space for pastoral cultivation and livestock grazing.

Over two centuries, Oran Park has been under the ownership of a number of different people and companies. Edward Lomas Moore, the wealthy grazier and one of the largest landholders in the Campbelltown district, owned Oran Park from 1871 until his death in 1882 (the family would own the property until 1939). Oran Park also had a significant association with the Honourable John Dawson-Damer who owned and lived at the property from 1969 until his death in 2002 (his family sold Oran Park in 2006). Dawson-Damer was a renowned motor racing enthusiast, in a national and international setting, and was attracted to the Oran Park property because of its proximity to the Oran Park Raceway. It was said that Dawson-Damer housed his own historic car collection in the stables and outbuildings of the Oran Park property.

The place is important in demonstrating aesthetic characteristics and/or a high degree of creative or technical achievement in New South Wales.

The establishment of Oran Park house on a prominent hilltop location in a rural setting reflects the landscape design principles that were practised in England in the early 19th century. The siting of the house in the landscape, reminiscent of the summit model, provided its residents with sweeping views of the countryside and vistas to and from Oran Park to neighbouring colonial estates in the Cowpastures district.

The relationship between the house, its formal gardens and wider landscape remains discernible. The original driveway to Camden Valley Way is partially discernible by the remnant vegetation.

Oran Park was originally constructed in the Victorian Italianate style and, since undergoing significant modifications, has been adapted to the Inter-War Georgian Revival style.

The place has a strong or special association with a particular community or cultural group in New South Wales for social, cultural or spiritual reasons.

With a long held use as a private residence, the social significance of Oran Park is limited.

However, Oran Park is widely recognised as an early cultural landscape and has some social significance for the greater Camden district (once the Cowpastures).

The place has potential to yield information that will contribute to an understanding of the cultural or natural history of New South Wales.

There is potential for archaeological studies to be undertaken on the Oran Park property. Although the pastoral and agricultural use of the land may have disturbed likely archaeological evidence, analysis of the landscape could reveal further information about how the land was laid out and used over time. There is also potential for archaeological evidence to be discovered in core areas immediately surrounding Oran Park house and the coach house that could reveal further information about the construction of the buildings and later works carried out on the property.

The place possesses uncommon, rare or endangered aspects of the cultural or natural history of New South Wales.

Oran Park is an early cultural landscape of the Cowpastures district. While not a rare example, it is representative of colonial country estates of the 19th century.

The place is important in demonstrating the principal characteristics of a class of cultural or natural places/environments in New South Wales.

Oran Park is of state heritage significance as a representative example of a mid-19th century cultural estate in the Cowpastures district. Established in the 1830s, Oran Park is a remnant country estate that reflects the landscape design principles that were practised in England at the time.

The siting of an imposing mansion-style house on a dominant natural hilltop or ridgeline was a British design type used throughout the Cowpastures district during the early to mid-19th century. With an extended driveway, entranceway and carriage loop, the placement of the house in this landscape encouraged those passing by to see the house and observe the status and wealth of the landowner.

This landscape design and the retention of the main house, outbuildings, driveways and setting makes Oran Park a representative example of an early cultural landscape.

== See also ==
- Australian residential architectural styles
