= Harrington Park, New South Wales =

Harrington Park
- Suburb
- Interactive map of Harrington Park
- Coordinates: 34°01′40″S 150°43′51″E
- Country: Australia
- State: New South Wales
- Region: Macarthur
- City: Sydney
- LGA: Camden Council
- Location: 60 km (37 mi) from Sydney CBD

Government
  - State electorate: Camden
  - Federal division: Hume
- Elevation: 75 m (246 ft)

Population
  - Total: 13,332 (2021 census)
- Postcode: 2567
Suburbs around Harrington Park
Cobbitty	Oran Park	Catherine Field
Cobbitty	Harrington Park	Currans Hill
Kirkham	Narellan	Smeaton Grange

Harrington Park is a suburb of the Macarthur Region of Sydney in the state of New South Wales, Australia in Camden Council. Once a grand estate, owned by the Fairfax family, it was subsequently developed as a residential suburb. Harrington Park House has been restored by Harrington Estates who manage the property on behalf of the Fairfax Estate.

== History ==
The area now known as Harrington Park was originally home to the Muringong, southernmost of the Darug people. Shortly after the arrival of the First Fleet in Sydney in 1788, four cows and two bulls strayed from a Government Farm at Rosehill and found their way to a rich expanse of lush land southwest of Sydney. It was seven years before the healthy herd (which had grown in number) was discovered.

Governor Hunter had the region surveyed in 1795 and named it Cowpastures in honour of the herd. The region was declared a Government reserve although settlers such as John Macarthur soon lobbied the Governor for land grants in the rich farming area.

In 1813, 2,000 acres (8.1 km^{2}) in the area was granted to trader Captain William Douglas Campbell as compensation for the loss of his snow Harrington which was seized by convicts, from its anchorage in Sydney Harbour, on the evening of 15 May 1808. In March 1809, His Majesty's Ship Dedaigneuse fell in with the Harrington near Manila, in the Philippines. After a short engagement, the vessel was driven on shore and totally destroyed. Campbell called the land Harrington Park in remembrance of his vessel.

When Captain Campbell died in 1827, he left Harrington Park to his two nephews, Murdock and John from Scotland, both of whom worked on the land. In 1833, young Murdock was shot on the property by bushranger James Lockhardt.

Abraham Davy bought Harrington Park from James Rofe in June 1853 for 2000 pounds. The property was sold by Jane Davy in 1875, after the death of her husband and eldest son Daniel in 1874. There are interesting photos of Harrington Park and the family taken in 1871 in descendants' possession. While the Davys lived at Harrington Park it was frequently visited by Quakers from around the world, and a sketch from 1854 by Frederick Mackie (a visiting Quaker) is in the Nan Kivell collection in National Library of Australia in Canberra.

Harrington Park Post Office opened on 16 October 1876.

Harrington Park was leased for several years before being sold to Abraham Davy in the 1859s, who later sold the property to Mr. and Mrs. William Rudd in 1875. After Mrs. Rudd's death in 1902, their grandson William Britton and his sister Mrs. Dunlop took control of the estate. They sold the property in the 1920s as a dairy farm to the Giddins family who in turn sold it to Arthur Swan.

In 1944, Sir Warwick Oswald Fairfax (at that time a director of John Fairfax Ltd) bought Harrington Park and the adjacent property (which was land granted to Lieutenant Edward Lord on 10 June 1815) from Swan. Sir Warwick Fairfax carried out renovations and additions to the homestead and set up a nursery in the 1950s specialising in camellias, roses and imported flowers. Until 1976, Sir Warwick ran a Poll Hereford stud where he bred many show-winning champions. He spent much time at Harrington Park with his family and dogs. It was a place where he enjoyed writing, country walks, picnics and devoting time to his family. The Harrington Park property is owned by the estate of Mary, Lady Fairfax.

== Heritage listings ==
Harrington Park has a number of heritage-listed sites, including:

- 1 Hickson Circuit: Harrington Park (homestead)
- 181 - 183 Northern Road: Orielton

== Demographics ==
According to the 2021 census, there were 13,332 people in Harrington Park.

- Aboriginal and Torres Strait Islander people made up 2.6% of the population.
- 77.5% of people were born in Australia. The next most common countries of birth were England 2.8% and India 1.3%.
- 78.8% of people spoke only English at home. Other languages spoken at home included Arabic 2.3%, Italian 1.5%, Spanish 1.5% and Mandarin 1.2%.
- The most common responses for religion were Catholic 39.3%, No Religion 21.0% and Anglican 15.6%.

Housing is almost entirely (97.8%) detached houses with no apartments recorded in the area at the time of the 2021 census. The houses tend to be large, with 92.1% of them having four or more bedrooms. A little over half of houses (60.4%) in the area are mortgaged.

== Governance ==
Harrington Park is part of the north ward of Camden Council represented by David Funnell (currently deputy mayor of Camden), Cindy Cagney and Peter Johnson. Lara Symkowiak is currently the local mayor. The suburb is contained within the federal electoral division of Macarthur, represented, until 2010, by former ultra-marathon runner Pat Farmer (Liberal), and the state electorate of Camden, currently held by Chris Patterson in the Liberal interest.
