= Studley Park, Narellan =

Studley Park
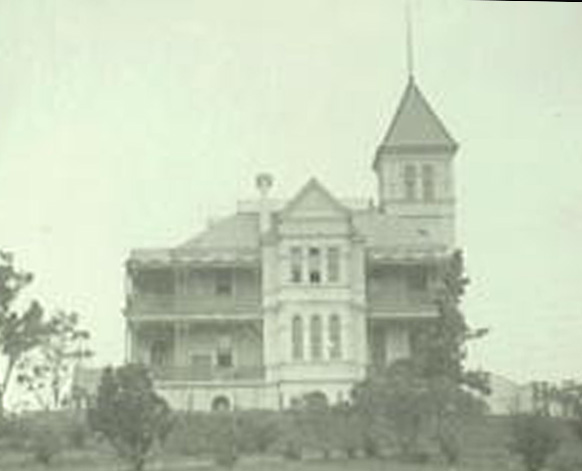
- Studley Park, circa 1900

- Location within Sydney Location within Australia
- 34°03′00″S 150°43′47″E
- Location: Camden Valley Way, Narellan, Camden Council, New South Wales, Australia

History
- Built: 1888–1889

Site notes
- Architect(s): A. L. & G. McCredie

New South Wales Heritage Register
- Official name: Studley Park; Payne's Folly; St. Helen's School; Campbelltown-Camden Grammar School; Camden Co
- Type: State heritage (complex / group)
- Designated: 2 April 1999
- Reference no.: 389
- Type: Mansion
- Category: Residential buildings (private)

Studley Park is a heritage-listed former defence establishment, grammar school and private residence and now clubhouse and golf course located at Camden Valley Way in the south-western Sydney suburb of Narellan in the Camden Council local government area of New South Wales, Australia. It was designed by A. L. & G. McCredie and built from 1888 to 1889. It is also known as Payne's Folly, St. Helen's School, Campbelltown-Camden Grammar School and Camden Co. It was added to the New South Wales State Heritage Register on 2 April 1999.

On 22/11/2019 a concept development application was lodged covering Studley Park and part of the adjoining golf course for a staged development comprising demolition, restoration works to Studley Park House, construction of 2 story hotel and at-grade parking, construction of 4 residential flat buildings with 2-4 stories and basement parking as well as associated road access, vegetation removal, landscaping and civil infrastructure.

== History ==
=== Land grant(s) ===
Two early grants comprise the land today forming Camden Golf Course / Studley Park estate (what remains of it). These were made in 1810 and 1812. Prior to this John Macarthur received a grant on the southern side of the Nepean River of 2,023 hectares (5,000 acres) and this became known as Camden Park Estate. Governor Macquarie granted two of Macarthur's employees, John Condron and William Parrott (both convicts who subsequently obtained freedom) each 40 hectares (100 acres) in 1810 and 1812 respectively. These two grants, when later combined, made up the original enclosure of Studley Park. They were used for farming, the 1814 muster showing that Parrott (his land became known as 'Parrott's Farm') was a landowner with two convicts under his control whilst the 1822 muster records that Condron had cleared 26 of his 100 acres and owned three houses, twenty five cattle and ten pigs.

William Parrot received the first grant on 1 January 1810. He arrived in the colony as a convict in 1791 and by 1807 was working as a shoemaker at Camden Park. The second grant was to John Condron on 25 August 1812. He was transported from Ireland arriving in 1800 and by 1806 was employed at Camden Park as a herdsman.

Both blocks changed hands a number of times in the 19th century. The only mention of any structures erected on either property (cited by Ray Herbert) is a carriage house that reportedly was erected on Condron's grant by Henry Ellison. The documents cited don't mention where this was situated and nothing remains of it today. The 1987 Conservation Plan (CP) includes this carriage house in a detailed chronology of the site, stating it was built c. 1870 and destroyed in a 1980s fire. It would appear that this is a confusion between the carriage house and the engine house/granary which burned down in 1982.

The 1987 Conservation Plan goes on to state that the transfer of Condron's grant in 1878 from Henry Ellison to William Henry Thompson shows that there was a building on the original Condron grant. However it is unclear if this was the carriage house or not.

The plan from 1840 shows that by this date Parrott's grant was mortgaged to a Mr Cooper and that three structures had been built on it. Two appear to be a cottage and outbuilding (possibly a stable belonging to a Mr Fitzpatrick and a single structure, most likely a cottage, belonging to a Dr Swayne), have been built on the grant facing the main road. A series of roads have been drawn on the block immediately to the east which represents the laying out of the town of Narellan. The closes one to Parrott's original grant appears to be the road which was later named Richardson Road. Also of interest is the church indicated east of Parrott's original grant which appears to be in the same position as the church which exists there currently.

Ellison owned the Condron grant until 1878 when it was transferred to William Henry Thompson. In 1884 Thompson purchased the adjacent 100 acres originally granted to Parrott, thereby combining the two properties and establishing the original boundary of Studley Park.

=== 1888-1902 Payne era - Studley Park ===
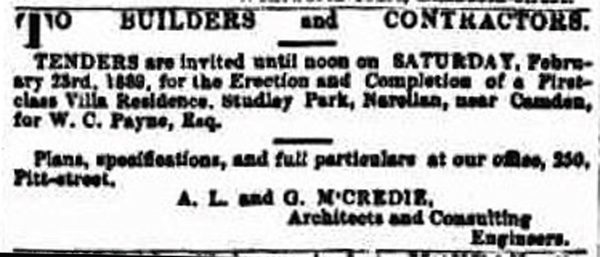
Advertising for a builder for Studley Park in the Sydney Morning Herald on 9 February 1889

On 2 October 1888 businessman William Charles Payne bought the combined property of 200 acres from Thompson for £1,400. He authorised A. L. & G. McCredie of Sydney to construct the house, stables and a granary/engine house. The engine house reportedly contained a steam traction engine and a dynamo which provided electricity to the house. A lengthy article in the Australasian Building and Contractors News edition dated 20 July 1889 described the project. It called the house a "picturesque looking villa-residence, in a light Italian style". A rendered drawing view of the house from the west incorporated the two floor plans produce by the McCredies at the time of construction. The original drawings are in the Mitchell Library as part of a collection of architectural drawings belonging originally to a William Keen. He was a Sydney architect born in England and trained at the Royal Academy School, London, before migrating to Australia in 1886. It has not been able to be ascertained if Keen was employed by A. L. & G. McCcredie.

Payne named the property "Studley Park". Ray Herbert writes that Payne named it after a property near where his father-in-law lived at Ripon in England. He also writes that at the time of construction four workers' cottages were built near the main road. These were visible on an aerial photograph taken in 1947, three side by side fronting Camden Valley Way with the fourth a little further away to the west, in the north-eastern corner of the original Studley Park landholding. It seems unlikely that these were constructed for workers on Studley Park as the project seems too small to warrant separate workers' accommodation. The area where the cottages were was further subdivided during the 1970s, resulting in formation of Wilton Crescent and the surrounding modern residential development.

There is no evidence Payne intended Studley Park to be a self-supporting farm. What is more likely is that it was established as a country retreat. Many such estates were established around the outskirts of Sydney during the latter half of the 19th century. Prosperity in the colony since the 1850s gold rushes had helped establish a class of wealthy merchants and business people who established such estates, thus imitating the behaviour of a similar class of people in England at the time. Within the Camden area a number of examples of gentlemen's country estates/residences were built in the 19th century. Structures such as Camelot at (nearby) Kirkham, Camden Park House, built for the Macarthur family, and Fernhill at Mulgoa to the north are examples. The main feature of these holdings was a grand house situated on a part of the landscape so as to be visible to neighbours and surrounding residences. The house at Studley Park is a good example of this, situated on a rise and equipped with a tower (Campanile) which enhances its visibility and makes it a prominent landmark in the area. The visibility and grandness emphasises the perceived importance of its owner and visually underlines their standing in society.

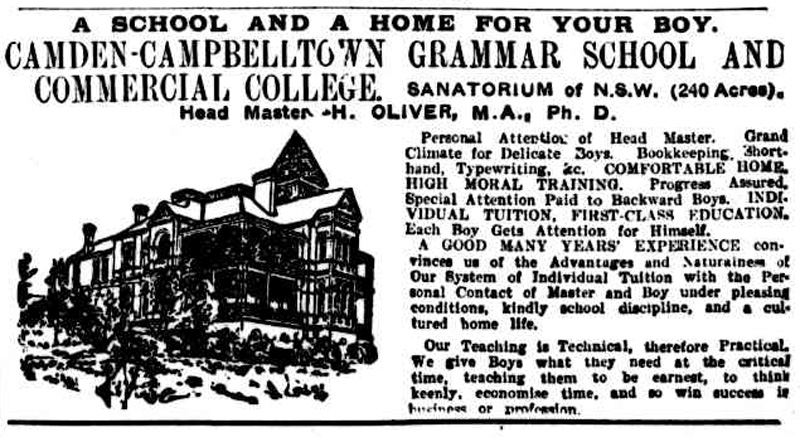
Advertising for the school, 1908

Studley Park was built at the height of a housing boom. Due to its size, grandiosity and the cost incurred, it came to be known as Payne's Folly. At the back is a large block containing stables and coach house.

Due to its elevation the house has clear views of (and its tower in particular can be viewed from) other colonial landmarks in the district such as the spire of St. John's Church, Camden, Camelot (formerly Kirkham), Harrington Park and Orielton estates.

The opulent mansion bankrupted Payne: he sold it in 1902 and it became Camden Grammar School.

=== Alternative history ===
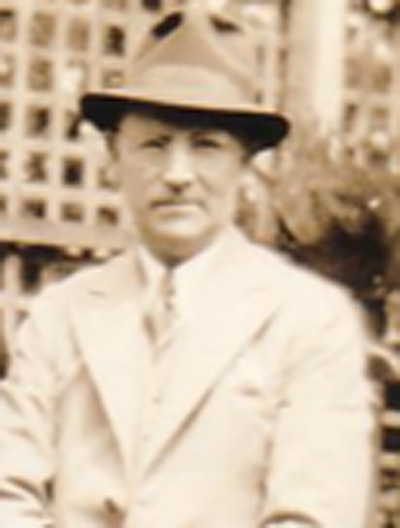
Archibald Adolphus Gregory, circa 1935

Payne sold the house to its architect, Francis Buckle, in 1891 and Buckle sold it in 1902 to Dr Henry Oliver.

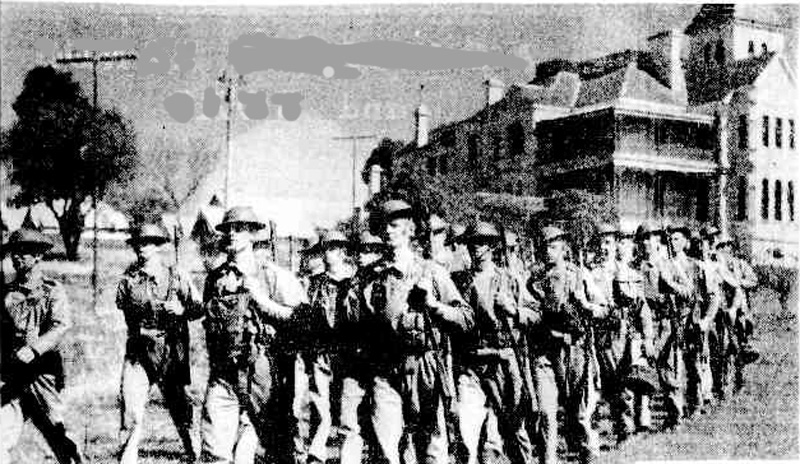
Studley Park as a military facility, 1939

It became Camden Grammar School until 1933 when it was sold to Arthur Gregory, a Hollywood movie mogul. Gregory, a keen golfer, commissioned construction of a nine-hole golf course, later adding another nine holes. A few decades later it was transformed into an art deco playground for the sales manager of 20th Century Fox. During World War II it was resumed as the Eastern Command Training School for the army.

In 1951 the first intake of the newly-formed Women's Royal Australian Army Corps began training at Studley Park House.

Today, Camden Golf Club owns and is restoring this house. It is open to the public during the year on specially-planned open days and for functions to raise money for restoration. In 2009 the house was sold to a private owner and the golf course land was transferred to the care, control and management of Camden Council.

== Description ==
=== Setting ===
The former Hume Highway (the main road south of Sydney once, now Camden Valley Way) was the original access to the site – an early set of gates are still visible on this road) abuts the grounds of the Studley Park / Camden Golf Club, to the west. Lodges Road (the current entry to Camden Golf Club) abuts the grounds to the east.

The original Studley Park estate (1880s) was in the order of 81 hectares (200 acres). The total remaining area today is 142.412 hectares (351.91 acres), including golf course, land for flood mitigation works, house lot etc.

Surrounding Studley Park House is Camden Golf Course.

Behind the outbuildings are a range of Army era buildings (from WW2), the club house (adapted from and extending the coach/carriage house) of the Camden Golf Course, parking and landscaped areas of golf course. Two areas of woodland abut the Army era buildings east of the main house, and in the golf course's north-east corner towards Camden Valley Way.

Including house, and former stables and carriage house block (Club House), located in the grounds of Camden Golf Course, Camden Valley Way and Lodges Road, Narellan.

=== Mansion – siting and composition ===
The Studley Park House is situated near the highest point of the ridge at the eastern section of allotment DP556856, Narellan. It could have been set further east, on the highest point, but to do so would have made it less visible from Camden Valley Way, formerly the Hume Highway, and from the neighbouring mansions Camelot and Kirkam, on the Cobbity Hills opposite. In order to impress those and other neighbours, it was set upon a mound at least 3m. high above ground level, was given an attenuated form, and topped with a tower with a peaked roof. The prominence and degree of visibility it achieved, which must have satisfied those who built it.

At the golf course's centre is the house – a large towered mansion on the property built for W.C. Payne in 1889 at the height of a housing boom. Due to its size, grandiosity and the cost incurred, it came to be known as Payne's Folly. There is a wealth of iron lacework. The interior is as extravagant as the exterior with decorative joinery, elaborate ceilings and stained glass. At the back is a large block containing the stables and coach house.

At the time of construction of Studley Park House, Camden Valley Way was the only road linking Camden to the city of Sydney, so that the access to the House had to be obtained via a carriage drive leading from it. The entry to the carriage drive was marked by a handsome gateway with white painted, decorated timber posts capped with finials and rails from which wire mesh was hung. The gateway was set in from the road, to allow adequate space for turning or to make way or stand by if another carriage was seeking to exit the property.

The carriage drive, in the best 18th century practice, did not follow a straight line to the house but curved gently towards it, following the contours. As early photographs show, it was not originally planted with its present avenue of Cypress trees; these do not appear until some decades later - they appear in the historic photographs of 1935 as being about ten years old. That photograph also shows an attempt at infill planting at regular intervals, with protective posts and wire around young plants within, no doubt to keep them from being eaten by stock. The driveway curved gently at the gateway to the house yard, after which it curved again to the left of the house, before curving sharply to the right, giving visitors a close up view of the towering front. It then curved sharply again to the left, splitting to form a teardrop-shaped carriage loop in front of an elegant staircase. After depositing its passengers, the carriage could then proceed to the coachhouse at the back of the house, or return via the loop.

Just after the entry gates to the House and before the Bunya Pine, a smaller road ran off the carriagedrive towards the north. This would have led not only to the engine house and shed, but also to Richardson Road behind St Thomas' cemetery, as mentioned in p. 24 of the Conservation Plan (CP).

=== Garden layout ===
Early photographs show very little planting in the House yard: just a few small trees plus a row of Pines to the south of it. The mature Bunya Pine at the front gateway may have been present in 1915 – the photograph is not easy to read – but most of the plantings were ornamentals from Britain. There were several of these about 5 metres (16 ft) tall scattered randomly near the House, but it is not easy to determine the species. They appear to have comprised plants such as Cypresses, Laurels, Liquidambar and Citrus. Another of the mid 1930s photographs confirms this. The ground to the south of the House was largely clear, covered with a lawn, as it is today. The slopes of the mound on which the House sits appears to have been planted with sprawling shrubs such as Honeysuckle and Briar Roses, much as it is today.

By 1933 the ground along the carriage drive within the homestead yard was planted with a deep border or shrubs. This pattern has been simplified today, but the essentials of the scheme have been retained. The 1935 photograph shows a couple of small trees along the "instep" of the carriageway curve, but it is doubtful that they were the same Crepe Myrtles present there today. One notable feature is that a side path led off the left of the carriageway towards the engine house and swimming pool, while a curved bed and path linked the tennis court to the point where the carriageway came closest to the house.

The principal adornment to the House's garden during the 1930s, following its acquisition by Mr A. A. Gregory in 1933, was an elaborate pergola and lattice construction on a low earth platform in the southern sector of the garden, adjacent to the kitchen block and former dining room. The lattice screen walls were at least 3 metres (9.8 ft) high and a doorway and a few steps gave access between the interior "garden room" and the lawn outside. We are fortunate to have a clear photograph of the interior of this garden room, which was itself divided into two linear spaces, one being defined by the pergola roof and lattice screen walls and intended for sitting within, and the other by screens in front of the kitchen block. The whole composition of lattice frames was held together by high, horizontal beams with a fringe of lattice below, a technique also used on the back garden. The ground was grassed, not paved, although a few large paving stones appear to be present in the centre of the seating area below the pergola. Some creepers grew up the screens, while most of the other planting were either in pots or herbaceous perennials of shade-tolerant species. Stag or elkhorn ferns were suspended from the screen walls at various places. An ornate Italianate fountain was located at the centre of a circular mound, which appears to have been sited directly over, or close to, the original well (from which it no doubt drew its water). The inspiration appears to have been American, in keeping with the redecoration of the interior of the House in a "Hollywood" style.

A somewhat similar, but lighter, pergola and screen structure was added to the front of the coachhouse and stables building, with a fringe of herbaceous plants around the bottom. A white post and rail fence also ran along the outside of the driveway in front of the pergola screen. Only remnant eucalypts were present in this part of the grounds.

Few details exist of the garden to the north of the House, other than the post and lattice framework that defined what appears to have been a shrubbery (the plants are too substantial to be vegetables). A wide flight of steps leads up the mound or platform of the house into this area, which is defined on its outer boundary by a white post and rail fence. Another flight of steps leads from the front verandah down into that shrubbery. A small tree, without leaves, appears in the roughly the location of the large Jacaranda present today, but it seems more like a dead eucalypt than a young Jacaranda. It is understood that a kitchen garden lay behind this shrubbery, and that an orchard once existed in the area now occupied by the Army buildings. However, according to the CP, this had been cleared by Dr Oliver between 1902-1919, possibly for use as a football field.

Contrary to the usual 19th century practice, the vegetation on the ridge to the north of the House was not cleared, and is visible in the 1915 and 1935 photographs. Those trees along the western boundary of the golf course had been thinned out and some appear to be regrowths after 19th century clearing. The land beyond the House grounds to the west and south was mostly covered with grass for grazing, with few trees left standing When that ceased, it was rough cut, being used as fairways for the golf course. The early dams were converted into water hazards for the golfers.

==== Fencing ====
As historical photographs show, the early fencing was post and rail, painted white, with wire mesh panels between. The tennis court fencing, although higher, was also treated in the same way. A white painted timber post and rail fence also ran along the outer edge of the carriageway, to ensure that vehicles did not stray over the fairly steep battered slope of the House's mound or platform.

==== Tennis Courts ====
A tennis court existed in the front yard/paddock to the south-west of the house from early on, although it is not clear whether this was built by the original owner, Mr. Payne, his successor Mr Buckle, or by Dr Oliver when the property was re-developed as a school after 1902. This court, with its high fencing topped by white painted rails, would have been quite visible to visitors arriving along the carriage drive. However, being set sufficiently to one side of the house, on a distinctly lower level, and largely transparent, it did not actually detract from the presentation of the House itself. Subsequently, a second tennis court was constructed behind this, closer to the House and on a platform about 2 metres (6 ft 7 in) higher than the first court. It is not clear from the CP when this was built, and by whom, but it does not appear in the photographs of 1935. However, the CP does refer to another tennis court, said to have been built opposite the coachhouse building and shown on the site plan "Private School 1902–1933". It is assumed that this would have been built during Dr. Oliver's tenure, but it also does not appear in photographs of this area in 1935. (One presumes that Mr Gregory was not much interested in tennis.)

==== The Golf Course ====
Insufficient evidence is available on the development of the golf course to say with certainty when it began. It would appear from early photographs, c. 1915, that some golf was being played on the land to south and south-west of the House, and it seems likely that its evolution as a formal course was incremental. On page 37 of the CP, it states that a Mr K. C. Whyte acquired a grazing licence over 57 hectares (140 acres) of the site and planned to reconstruct the golf course (which confirms that it previously existed, although probably in an amateurish form). The CP then states that from 1948 "all but 7 hectares (18 acres) of the property were leased to the Camden Golf Club who, taking Whyte's idea, proposed to re-establish a golf course on the site". Renovations for the Golf Club began during 1949, but it was not until 1950, when Whyte's lease expired, that the Golf Club was granted a ten-year lease from the Army, with an option to renew for a further ten years.

According to the CP, p. 38, "the lease of a large portion of the estate to the Camden Golf Club precipitated the destruction or alteration of large areas of the former landscaping". It is assumed that many of the plantings, especially of Jacarandas, Camphor Laurels and Eucalypts, as well as the shrubs along the carriage drive, were planted during this early period of "alteration". Perhaps taking its cue from the CP, p. 54, the same Club removed those Jacarandas between 1997 and 1999, in order to restore the visual prominence of the House and protect its foundations. However, while the Club also made some 'dramatic alterations" to the landforms when redesigning the golf course, the continued existence of the extensive fairways has preserved the important vistas between the House and the main roads, in a broad arc from the south-west to the north-west.

==== Statement of Significance ====
The siting of the house on a platform on a prominent knoll towards the rear of the estate reflects the practice of Victorian landowners of the boom period. Through this, they could display their wealth, participate in social rivalry with other major landowners in the district, and enjoy the impressive visual catchments out to the south and around to the north-west.

The carriagedrive and its entry gateways has a high degree of both historical and aesthetic significance, being the original access way to the House from 1889 and retaining its gently curving form and characteristic plantings throughout the last century (although some of the plantings are replacements from later periods). The curving form reflects 18th century landscape design, retained for use in providing different visual sequences to, and a final impressive display of, the grand House in the process of arrival. It also has a degree of social significance, being valued by the present community.

The carriage loop has a moderate to high degree of historical and aesthetic significance, having essentially the same configuration as that of the original, although without the accompanying post and rail fence and associated plantings of Pine Trees.

The grounds have a moderate degree of historical significance, generally retaining their original layout but having lost all the original plantings, pathways, and clearly defined functional areas (such as orchard, kitchen garden, and shrubbery). They have a minor degree of aesthetic significance in that they demonstrate the landscaping concepts of the early owners, even though the fabric and integrity has largely been lost.

The pergola and lattice structures of the mid 1930s, though interesting and innovative, were not typical of either the overall landscaping concept of the House or of landscape design in New South Wales in that period. Although they reflected the taste and ideas of the American owner who redecorated the interior of the house in an art deco style, they were not a clear expression of that style with regard to landscape design. Rather, they gave the impression of an improvised Hollywood set.

The post and rail fencing has mostly disappeared, but had historical and aesthetic significance as a clear example of a style favoured by wealthy Victorian and Edwardian landowners at the turn of the century, and as such, carried some social significance as well. They warrant reinstatement.

The tennis courts (or at least their sites) have a moderate degree of historical and social significance, demonstrating a form of recreation favoured by landowners and schools for gentlefolk for the first three to four decades of the 20th century. They carry the potential to be restored to their former use.

The trees on the site have varying degrees of significance, depending on their age and with which phase of ownership they were associated. Those of greater historical and aesthetic significance are the senescent Pine, old Camphor Laurel and a few old Pepper Trees originally planted (c. 1890–1900) just beyond the south-west sector of the drive, and the mature Bunya Pine at the entrance to the House grounds. Some of the Cypresses along the carriagedrive also have a moderate degree of significance. The Jacaranda and the Liquidambar to the north and west of the House have a low degree of significance, being plantings by the Golf Club after 1950, as have the shrubs along the carriagedrive within the House grounds.

The part regenerated, part remnant Eucalypt woodland to the north of the House has a moderate degree of historical, technical and aesthetic significance, demonstrating the original landcover of the property and its unusual retention despite its successive periods of quite different ownerships and land uses. Its existence as a rich textural backdrop and setting to the House gives it some aesthetic value, as does the screening it provides for the otherwise visually intrusive Army barracks.

The golf course has historical and social significance as a valued recreation facility that has existed on the site in varying formats since the 1920s, and has high aesthetic value for continuing the role of the former grazing fields in providing a "forecourt" and setting to Studley Park House.

=== House ===
A fine example of a Boom style high Victorian mansion, set in a prominent location, with its outbuildings representing an important period in a series of large nineteenth-century houses in this region. Internally the house is important for its exuberant detailing, its central hall and staircase, and its stained glass window. Large towered Boom style mansion. External walls of heavily moulded cement render, encrusted with a profusion of debased architectural detail of vaguely Italianate character. Slate roof, imported Italian marble entrance stair. Large stained glass window in a tower with a moulded monogram. Victorian iron lace. Internally exuberant style of exterior is maintained, grand staircase with open first floor gallery, stained glass, fine woodwork.

Due to its elevation the house has clear views of (and its tower in particular can be viewed from) other colonial landmarks in the district such as the spire of St. John's Church, Camden, Camelot (formerly Kirkham), Harrington Park and Orielton estates.

== Heritage listing ==
As at 24 March 2000, Studley Park is a place of State significance for its aesthetic and visual qualities associated with a very fine nineteenth-century country house and its setting and for its historic associations with important uses and historic themes of twentieth century development around Sydney. Studley Park House and associated historic lands that now form Camden Golf Club course are an important and comparatively rare cultural landscape that retains an open landscape character and setting for the House, typifying a grand, nineteenth-century country estate. This cultural landscape setting includes important views that physically connect Studley Park to other nearby historic "country estates" such as "Camelot" and "Kirkham Stables", and define a broader historic landscape in the areas surrounding Camden.

Studley Park House is an excellent example of Victorian Italianate architecture, enhanced by its prominent location and open landscape setting. It is one of the last "country estate" dwellings to be built in the Camden/Campbelltown area and is representative of the work of the Sydney firm of architects A. L. & G. McCredie. It has fine internal spaces joinery and finishes.

Subsequent phases of use of Studley Park provide evidence of important themes in Sydney's history, including school education, defense and recreation. Studley Park is associated with the development of school education at the end of the nineteenth century and of private school education in the Camden/Campbelltown area in particular.

Studley Park was one of a number of places around Sydney associated with Australia's preparations for World War II and its activities and its preparedness after the War, including the establishment of the Women's Royal Australian Army Corps.

The period of ownership of Studley Park House by Arthur Gregory in the 1930s is represented by its remaining "Hollywood" style internal finishes and is supported by high quality contemporary photographs. Gregory was the representative of the US film company Twentieth Century Fox in Australia. Gregory's use of Studley Park as a private residence, "golf-country club" and film theatre represent both connections to other uses of the place and some aspects unique to Gregory's ownership. The continued use of the place as a golf course since the 1930s is significant and has helped retain the landscape character of the place associated with its earlier country estate history.

While compromised by modern additions, the former Stables building (current Golf Clubhouse) retains an historic and visual relationship with Studley park House and has the potential to be reconstructed in its original form. The archaeological resource of the site of Studley Park has the potential to contribute to an understanding of some aspects of the construction and maintenance of a substantial late-nineteenth century 'country estate'

The site has natural heritage value in retaining two areas of regenerating remnant (endangered ecological community) Cumberland Plain Woodland including a population of the nationally endanaged shrub species, Pimelea spicata.

Studley Park was listed on the New South Wales State Heritage Register on 2 April 1999.

== See also ==
- Australian residential architectural styles
