= Harrington Park (homestead) =

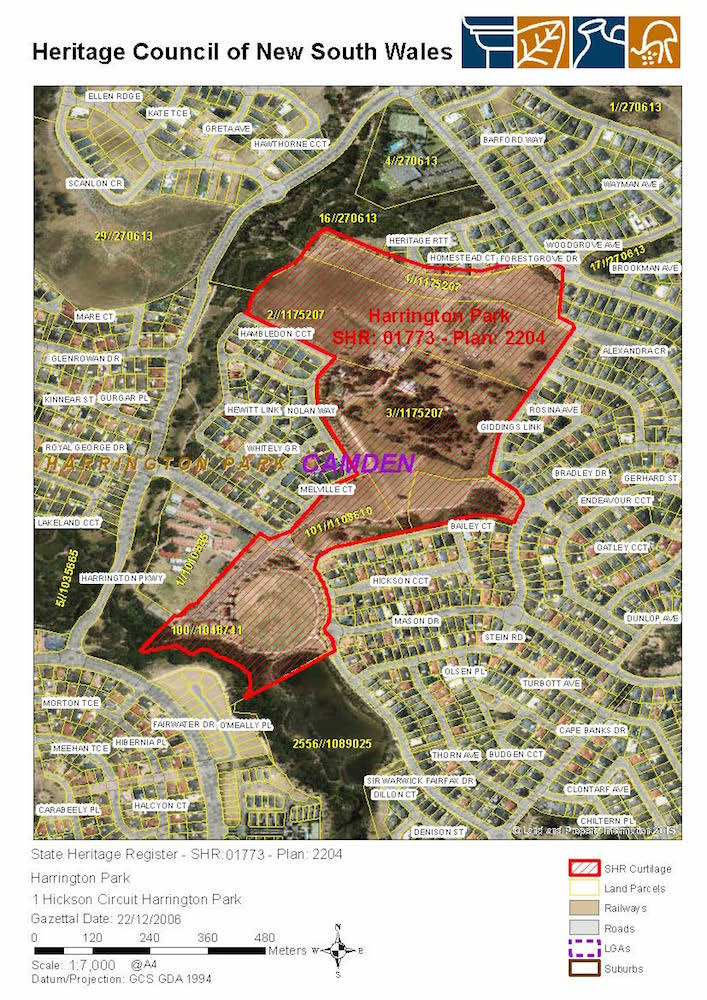
- Heritage boundaries

- Location within Sydney Location within Australia
- 34°01′26″S 150°44′33″E
- Location: 1 Hickson Circuit, Harrington Park, New South Wales, Australia

History
- Built: 1817–1827

Site notes
- Architects: Unconfirmed (original); Marcel Weyland (1950/60s additions)

New South Wales Heritage Register
- Official name: Harrington Park
- Type: State heritage (landscape)
- Designated: 22 December 2006
- Reference no.: 1773
- Type: Homestead Complex
- Category: Farming and Grazing

Harrington Park is a heritage-listed rural estate and former race track, located at 1 Hickson Circuit, Harrington Park, New South Wales, an outer suburb in south-western Sydney, Australia. The original designer is unconfirmed, with 1950–60s additions completed by Marcel Weyland. The homestead was built from 1817 to 1827. The property is privately owned and was added to the New South Wales State Heritage Register on 22 December 2006.

== History ==
=== The Cowpastures frontier ===
The Europeans first saw the Camden area in August 1790. Captain Watkin Tench, Lieutenant William Dawes and surgeon George Worgan (late surgeon of the Sirius) undertook an expedition where the country had not previously been explored by the settlers. The second expedition into the Camden area by Europeans was in 1795.

For a short period the settlement was short on livestock because the cattle that arrived on the First Fleet had escaped within five months of its arrival. A large importation from India in May 1795 had ended the shortage. Nonetheless a party was organized by Governor Hunter to investigate the stories of the Aboriginal people that the first herd (which had grown substantially in size) was grazing 60 kilometres (37 mi) to the south-west of the Sydney town centre. Sixty-one cattle were found grazing in open country beyond the Nepean River. Hunter named the area the Cowpastures; the name used in England for the common grazing of land near a village.

The country impressed the Europeans but it was too far away from the seat of government to be useful. Governor Hunter left the cattle to multiply undisturbed. In 1800 when the herd numbered about five or six hundred, his successor Governor King tried unsuccessfully to have the cattle mustered. When that plan failed he had a slab hut built at the river crossing place, which acted as a guard house and a base for butchering. Governor King tried to stop settlers from going there.

During King's time the Cowpastures was becoming a fine spot for visiting naval officers and those interested in romantic landscapes. To prevent depredations on the wild herd, on 6 July 1803 Governor King issued a proclamation forbidding people to cross to the western bank of the Nepean River without a permit signed by the Governor (cattle were thought to have been killed by escaped convicts as a source of sustenance). In a later ruling on 1 March 1804 he continued the ban, stating that "no ground whatever ought to be granted or leased to individuals on the other side of the Nepean". It appears that a number of settlers occupied land on the Nepean from 1800, although no grants were issued there until 1805, and early accounts of this occupation suggest that most was on the north-eastern bank.

Historian Alan Atkinson reports the river flats drew admiration from the Europeans who travelled through in 1795. They described "large ponds covered with ducks and the black swan, the margins of which were fringed with shrubs of the most delightful tints". Governor Bligh, a naval man, particularly admired the second type of country in the district rising gradually from the river as "Hills and Dales, waving like the Sea, their Bases nearly uniting and rising as they advance towards the high Mountains" [of the Razorback range]. The Europeans thought the flats were perfect for cattle and the hills would carry sheep. They admired the absence of underbrush – probably achieved through Aboriginal land management practices (burning off) – and felt comfortable with a landscape that reminded them of an English gentleman's park.

In spite of Governor Bligh's ruling that no further grants should be made at Cowpastures, small settlers made their homes on the Sydney side of the Nepean from about 1810. This move was part of a large push to extend the settlement southwards after floods and over-cultivation had blighted the Hawkesbury farming area.

The New South Wales Corps deposed Governor Bligh on 26 January 1808 and during the interregnum, which lasted until Lachlan Macquarie replaced Bligh as Governor in January 1810, members of the Corps served as lieutenant governors. Joseph Foveaux in particular thought Bligh's restriction of land grants was detrimental to the colony's progress and he granted land to all who requested it, spreading the small farmers broadly across the Cumberland landscape. Even so, as John Booth's map of 1810 indicates, the "Cowpastures plains" was remote, at the edge of the known landscape.

Restoring order after the rebellion, Governor Macquarie recalled a number of the grants given out by Foveaux and Paterson during the interregnum but he agreed that the "right" or northern bank of the Nepean should be settled. He had James Meehan survey the area and made additional grants on the Sydney side of the river. Some of these were modest, ranging from 20 to 81 hectares (50 to 200 acres), but others were extensive. From 1812, Macquarie began to allot land north of Camden to potential large scale landowners, men of substance in the colony. Food shortages and the imminence of population growth as the Anglo-American War of Independence drew to a close prompted this move to favourable ground in the south-west of the Sydney Plain. The first grants in the area were made in 1815: Kirkham to John Oxley (Surveyor-General) who was also granted the 332-hectare (820-acre) Elderslie farm; Harrington to William Campbell (sea captain and Pacific trader); and Orielton to Simeon Lord (ex-naval officer and entrepreneur). In 1816 there was Netherbyres to Molle (regimental colonel) and Nonnorah (later Maryland) to Dickson (steam miller). About the same time, grants of a similar kind were made: Macquarie's Gift to Cowper (clergyman); Denbigh to Hook (merchant); Curtis to Blaxcell (merchant); and Raby to Riley (merchant). Macquarie later regretted his generosity because of the great numbers of cattle stolen from the government herds after the settlers had moved into the area.

At first, these, and similar properties in the neighbourhood were used for sheep and cattle; the few assigned resident convict stockmen lived in primitive huts. By the 1820s some owners looking for "rural retreats" and needing to cultivate the land, established residences and began to build permanent homes with associated farm buildings. These included Oxley and Campbell. The practice began of such landowners running sheep beyond the mountains (on Crown land), using their Cowpasture estates for breeding and agistment and, increasingly, developing agriculture, which began to include milling, threshing, and viticulture as allied activities.

=== Founder of Harrington Park, William Douglas Campbell ===
Captain William Douglas Campbell was a member of the British merchant navy who worked initially in the India trade. He was the most knowledgeable navigator of the Pacific region. He first visited the colony of New South Wales in 1797 on the brig Deptford that brought merchandise from Madras. Two years later he returned as captain of the Rebecca and came to Sydney again in 1801 as master of the brig Harrington. On the way back to Madras in 1803 he visited Chile and Peru for trade purposes and was so successful that he purchased a half-share in the Harrington and returned there the following year. On this occasion, he raided the coast on the "somewhat flimsy excuse" that he believed England and Spain to be at war. When he next visited Sydney, Governor King detained the Harrington while he investigated whether Campbell's actions amounted to piracy. Though Navy officials in England judged Campbell's action to be highly questionable, they returned his ship but confiscated his prizes, which they sold for A£5,054.

Campbell next entered the sandalwood trade with John Macarthur. His profits from delivering Fijian sandalwood to China and returning with oriental merchandise enabled him to buy the remaining share in the Harrington. Having been a close associate of Macarthur before the New South Wales Corps deposed Governor Bligh in 1808, Campbell later fell out with Macarthur and supported Governor Macquarie. In 1809 escaping convicts seized the Harrington and she was destroyed by her pursuers near Manila.

Campbell continued to trade sandalwood from Fiji until late that year when that resource was exhausted. He subsequently concentrated on the trade in salt pork from Tahiti that he had initiated in 1805. During one of his voyages he recaptured the Venus from Tahitian rebels and rescued the English missionaries escaping the civil war. Campbell returned to London where he succeeded in gaining compensation for the Harrington. The grant of 809 hectares (2,000 acres) near Camden issued by Governor Macquarie on 10 June 1815 was his payment for that loss. Campbell continued trading, though in a less flamboyant manner, until 1817 when he settled on his property naming it Harrington Park after his ship. During the next ten years he stayed mainly at his farm where he died on 3 March 1827.

==== Building the homestead ====
Some sources state that the first house that William Douglas Campbell built at Harrington Park – now the kitchen – was a modest single-room dwelling of local bricks with a stone floor and a fireplace at one end and sleeping cabins at the other. Another room provided washing facilities with water from the well nearby. These arrangements were similar to those of other gentlemen farmers when establishing their country properties. Other local farms that began with similar dwellings were Elizabeth Farm at Parramatta, Brownlow Hill at Cobbitty and Nonorrah (later Maryland) at Bringelly. James Broadbent in his book "The Australian Colonial House" (p151), states that Campbell "built a simple two-storeyed single-pile brick house which he enlarged some time before his death". Broadbent believes that, not only did W. D. Campbell build the two-storey house at Harrington Park, but he also made significant changes to it before his death.

==== Later generations of Campbells ====
W. D. Campbell never saw the homestead fully completed, dying in 1827 aged 57. He left the estate to his nephews Murdoch and John Campbell. In 1828 the Census recorded (his nephew) Mr Murdoch Campbell and Mrs A. Campbell living at Harrington Park with convict servants Sarah Maker, housemaid and William Bailey, cook. The farm had 324 hectares (800 acres) of cleared land with 81 hectares (200 acres) in cultivation and 150 cattle and nine horses. The convict labourers working the farm were Patrick Murphy, Samuel Lester, Lawrence Lyons, Abraham Malabar and Joseph Parker. In 1830 William Riley described the Campbell's' altered residence as "an elegant mansion on an eminence and about 324 hectares (800 acres) cleared and in cultivation".

The first subdivision of Harrington Park occurred on 29 August 1829 when Murdoch Campbell sold 324 hectares (800 acres) of enclosed land from the northern part of the estate to his cousin John Douglas Campbell for £600. This farm was named Aberfoil. Two years later, he leased, and later sold, a smaller farming allotment of 121 hectares (300 acres) north of the Cobbitty Road to George Graham, a farmer from Liverpool.

Murdoch Campbell was murdered at Harrington Park by an escaped convict or bushranger in 1833. After his death, his share in the Harrington Park estate passed to his eldest brother, William Douglas Campbell the younger, a resident of Scotland, and the property reportedly declined from that time. The incumbent released very small allotments in the form of 99-year leases – two just over one hectare (two acres) to James Greenfield and John Graham, and two of about zero hectares (one acre) to Andrew Keaton and another unnamed recipient.

In 1838 William Douglas Campbell the younger died without a will and his share of the estate passed to his eldest son, Alexander, an Edinburgh merchant, who issued a power of attorney for the property to his brother William Douglas Campbell III of Arbroath, Scotland, on the understanding that he was about to embark for New South Wales. However, later title details show that W. D. Campbell III was a writer who never left Scotland.

John Douglas Campbell who had purchased the 324-hectare (800-acre) farm named Aberfoil in 1829 sold it to Henry William Johnson in 1842 for £1,600. He made the sale in the worst year of the 1840s depression, so it seems likely that he had financial problems. His action permanently removed this farm from the Harrington Park estate. It later became Oran Park. Outraged, Alexander Campbell, still residing in Scotland, opened legal proceedings against John Campbell in the New South Wales Supreme Court, claiming that he had no right to sell off parts of the Harrington Park estate. The Court ruled that the remnant parts of the estate be divided between Alexander and John Campbell. The remaining 364-hectare (899-acre) portion (with the homestead on it) was sold at auction to the highest bidder, Sydney leather dealer James Rofe for £1,775, together with the 3 hectares (8 acres) under lease. The enforced sale ended the Campbell's interest in Harrington Park. It appears that Rofe's interest was purely speculative for he sold the diminished Harrington Park to Abraham Davy in 1853.

=== Abraham Davy (Davey), ownership 1853–1874 ===
When Abraham Davy purchased Harrington Park in 1853, the property still had a significant amount of open forest and bushland. Improvements included a reasonable amount of cleared land, a dam, a racecourse, and numerous grass paddocks. Close to the house was a chain of ponds that supplied the dam and this was the site where smaller fields supported oats, barley and wheat. The main approach to the house passed a large pond or lake and there was a store and stockyard nearby. A gardener tended a one-hectare (two-acre) garden on the Cowpasture Road (now Camden Valley Way) side of the house.

Abraham Davy has been credited with restoring and improving Harrington Park to the point where it became "one of the most picturesque in the district of Camden". Davy also added land to the estate in 1863 when he bought 60 acres of the adjoining Orielton farm when it was subdivided by James Ryan esquire of Emu Plains and Sydney wine and spirit merchant James Jones. As well as renovating the property, Davy restored some of the pursuits that gentleman expected to enjoy on their country estates. As Carol Liston reports in her history of Campbelltown, Davy introduced live hare coursing to Harrington Park. It is not possible, however, to trace details of the other changes that Davy made.

Records of William Macarthur's Camden Park Nursery sales indicate that Davy, who was proposed as a member of the Australian Horticultural and Agricultural Society in September 1857, undertook an extensive planting program with many of his purchases consisting of conifers. A photograph c. 1860s–90s shows a grassed carriage loop with shrubs or small trees in a garden bed abutting the verandah. Trees are in the background to the side of and behind the house.

=== The Rudd family, ownership 1874–1934 ===
The Rudd family's ownership of Harrington Park began when William Rudd Senior purchased the property on 6 March 1874. It still retained the triangular shape created after the sale of the northern section to John Campbell in 1829, comprising the 889 acres of the original Harrington Park together with the southern addition of the 53 hectares (131 acres) in Lot 1 of the Orielton Park subdivision. William Rudd Senior was a grazier who owned Houlong Station on the Lower Murrumbidgee River. It appears that this family originated from Campbelltown as Carol Liston includes William Rudd's sons, Isaac and James in her list of Campbelltown families who held squatting licences between 1847 and 1850. According to Liston, a significant proportion of the Campbelltown farmers were ex-convicts who owned small holdings. Whether this was true of the Rudds or not, during the squatting era, it was common for established farmers and graziers to send their sons out into the hinterland to build grazing properties. It was also customary for graziers to move closer to town in their more mature years leaving their sons to continue to work their country estates. In such cases there could be a continuing connection between the grazing runs and the home in town or, in this case, close to the city.

William Rudd died in 1885 leaving Harrington Park to his wife Emma for the remainder of her life, and then to his married daughter, Elizabeth Britten who was to hold the property in trust until her children Walter and Emma Mary Harrington Britten reached the age of 21. At the time of William's death, Harrington Park comprised 413 hectares (1,020 acres). Unusual for the district, its main livestock were 350 sheep and it also carried 40 cattle and 5 pigs. There was no dairy herd although dairying was emerging as the main farming activity in the Camden-Campbelltown area at this time.

Major renovations were made to the house in the 1890s and a new drive was created which passed an ornamental pond and entered through a picket-fenced gateway to the garden on the east of the house. A photograph taken during this period indicates the tall shrubs in the garden bed next to the verandah had been removed but the still current Cupressus sp. to the rear of the house are mature. Pedestals were constructed at the foot of the verandah steps. Changes that the Rudds made to the house in the late nineteenth century include replacement, or covering of the shingle roof with corrugated iron and replacement of the original timber-trimmed veranda with one of Victorian design. The new veranda featured an ogee corrugated iron roof and trim of cast iron filigree that were fashionable at the time. Rudd's daughter Elizabeth Britten died young in 1886, but his widow survived until 1902. The estate passed to William Rudd's grandchildren Walter William and Emma Mary Harrington Britten. In 1905 Emma married Harold Herbert Dunlop, an insurance risk assessor of Narellan. Her brother Walter continued to farm on the property, raising a mortgage of £1,100 that year, possibly to buy out his sister. Not much is known about Walter Britten's farming activity but he leased some of the land to dairy farmer in the interwar period and the remainder to a Sydney agent, Lee Chapman Solomon in 1931.

It appears that this period was not kind to William Rudd's grandchildren as they sold the property in 1934 not long after the worst years of the Great Depression. Few of the large properties in the district survived intact. The farming ventures still concentrated on dairying to supply the city, or stud farms for horses or cattle. There was a considerable amount of subdivision with real estate agents offering farmlets for orchards or poultry. Some of these were established for soldiers returning from World War I. Gentleman farmers were rare in this environment.

=== Arthur and Elaine Swan, ownership 1934–1944 ===
Harrington Park first became a country retreat when Sydneysiders Arthur Donovan Swan and his wife Elaine Gordon Hall Swan purchased the property in 1934 as the depression began to lift for people of means. Once ensconced, Swan described himself a grazier and financier of Narellan.

The Swans were also the proprietors of Lot 8 of Orielton Estate, lots 43, 44, 50, 51, 52 and part of lot 45 of Perry's subdivision of Orielton Estate and adjoining land (all part portion 43) of 367 hectares (908 acres). All of this was transferred to John Fairfax & Sons in 1947.

=== The Fairfax family 1944–2005 ===
The famed Fairfax publishing dynasty bought Harrington Park in 1944 in the name of John Fairfax & Sons Ltd., a public holding company formed to fund its expansion into other media. At the time the company acquired the property, during World War II, part of a military camp occupied a piece of land in the north-west corner. Known locally as Greene's Corner, "Narellan Camp" was an extensive military facility established as a place for army units to form up before they were posted. Situated approximately 1.5 miles from Narellan, it clustered around four points of the intersection of Cobbitty and Northern Roads. The Harrington Park corner accommodated the guard room and camp hospital whilst the Orielton corner, held the engineers' depot, canteen and armoured vehicles that were concealed in the bush. On the Denbigh corner were 150 to 200 tents, most accommodating six men each, while the corner that is now part of Oran Park Raceway held the camp administration and the horse lines. The Army used other neighbouring historic properties such as Studley Park and Brownlow Hill and the Camden district also accommodated RAAF training squadrons at the local Aerodrome.

At 72 kilometres (45 mi) by the Hume Highway (formerly the Great South Road), the Narellan campsite was ideal, because the district was sufficiently distant from Sydney for security purposes but close enough for regular contact. The Army removed the whole facility when the war ended leaving only areas of bitumen and concrete.

An aerial photograph from the time of transfer to the Fairfax family indicates the garden as having a defined southern edge with the garden extending east over part of the area (?) shown as 'garden (i.e.kitchen/vegetable garden) and gardener's house on the 1852 map. Many of the plantings are mature but the traditional viewline to the Razorback Range may have been appreciable. The location of the race course is no longer apparent but the cleared alluvial flats are still cleared. Between Cowpasture Road (Camden Valley Way) and the cleared flats in 1852 there was an area marked "bush land". This is now cleared with scattered trees and the current entrance road deviates from its original marked course in this location. Tropman and Tropman have analysed the 1952 map of the property stating that the "fields around the house remain, although in attenuated form".

Sir Warwick Oswald Fairfax Kt., cr. 1967 (b.1901– d.1987) became sole owner of Harrington Park in 1956. Warwick Fairfax joined the staff of the Sydney Morning Herald in 1925, and was appointed director in 1927. Following the death of his father, Sir James Oswald Fairfax in 1928, Warwick was appointed Managing Director and Chairman of Directors in 1930. Following the incorporation of John Fairfax Ltd. in 1956 he was appointed Chairman, a position he retained until 1977. He was knighted in 1967.

Following the death of his mother Lady Fairfax in 1965, Warwick inherited the historic harbour side mansion Fairwater at 560 New South Head Road, Double Bay. Owned by his family from 1900 until 2018, Fairwater became the family's permanent Sydney seat and Harrington Park its country retreat. Warwick Fairfax married three times: M. (1) 1928, Marcie E. Wilson (James 1 d.); (2) 1948, Hanne A. Bendixsen (1 d.); (3) 1959, Mary Wein (Warwick 1 d. 1 s.).

Warwick Fairfax began major renovations to Harrington Park in 1957. North Sydney Architects Fowell Mansfield & Maclurcon planned the changes, and the building work was supervised by T. W. Jackson Pty Ltd. During this period a garden study was also built in a secluded part of the garden. This building was designed by Wilshire, Hodges and (Marcel) Weyland and furnished by Emery T. Reeves. Other estate buildings renovated at the same time were a cottage on Bringelly Road and the manager's residence on Northern Road. The renovations included construction of new cottages for the manager, housekeeper and gardener and a glasshouse was added to the garden. Local contractors regraded the entrance road and constructed a bridge over the creek. Other additions were a new dam, pig yards and a children's cubby house. Changes to the Fairfax Board in the early 1960s allowed Warwick Fairfax more time for private and intellectual pursuits. In his new study at Harrington Park he wrote The Triple Abyss: Towards A Modern Synthesis. Published in London in 1965, this book explored major world religions and synthesised them into a liberal view that explained his own philosophy. After his third marriage (1959), Fairfax spent more time at Harrington Park with his family and devoted more time to his writing. At the same time he was also engaged with company affairs and orchestrated coverage of the electoral campaigns, continued to take a keen interest in electoral campaigns and other issues editorialised in the Sydney Morning Herald.

In 1966 Warwick Fairfax expanded the property with the purchase of the Funnell's property that straddled Campbell's Portion 60 and Molle's Portion 59. In 1967 two pavilion style rooms (master bedroom and retreat) were added to the northern side of the house.

==== Changes to the estate since 1980 ====
In 1981, Camden Council approved in principle the residential subdivision and development of the Harrington Park estate. By the mid-1980s the house knoll was largely treed on the southern slopes so that views from the house are oriented to the hills to the north and the arrangement of paddocks and fields is more open. Tropman & Tropman wrote '...by the late 1970s/early 1980s, the city man's country house was becoming increasingly divorced from its rural setting and oriented towards a more desired landscape of forests, groves and hilly dales'. The reorientation of the relationship of the house in its garden setting with the broader landscape is likely to be directly related to plans for a suburban subdivision to the south of the house. In 1982 a Commission of Inquiry into the future of Harrington Park recommended that the 320 hectares (790 acres) in the southeast corner be rezoned from rural to urban, which was approved by then Planning Minister Craig Knowles in 1986. An area of 40 ha around the house was to be retained by the Fairfax family.

In the late 1980s, planning commenced and the first of the Harrington Park villages (Lakeside) began construction in 1994.

Currently the name "Harrington Park Estate" is used for the suburban area developed to the south of Narellan Creek, Stage 1 of a development which extends to the north of Narellan Creek. A 1997 proposal for an altered curtilage to the house was rejected by Camden Council. The direct relationship between the homstead group and its traditional landscape features, such as Narellan Creek and Crear Hill, has been recently compromised by intervening suburban development. During the 1990s, the residential development continued. Construction of the third Harrington Park Village (Park Haven) was underway in 2005. By 2011, Harrington Grove (north-east of the homestead) was nearing completion.

== Description ==
=== Estate ===
The 1815 grant was for 809 hectares (2,000 acres). The 1828 census noted that 324 hectares (800 acres) of this was cleared and 81 hectares (200 acres) cultivated. Broadly that comprised rich alluvial flats where paddocks of crops and cultivated land were, and broader grazing paddocks, with scattered remnant eucalypt sclerophyll woodland across the ridge of hills to the homestead's north.

Harrington Park homestead complex is the core of a once much larger historic farm estate, covering what today is the new suburb of Harrington Park, Harrington Grove etc. The centre of the historic estate including the area around the homestead, outbuildings, garden, yards, former nursery site(s) etc. remains although the remainder has been subdivided, rezoned and is being redeveloped in stages as a residential suburb, primary school and open space areas.

Landscape Elements

- access from Camden Valley Way along Sir Warwick Fairfax Drive
- Hickson Circuit entry gates – arrival fence lines, ford and pond
- fencing to the home paddock, cattle grid and remnant c.1890 fencing
- formal entry driveway and carriage loop
- gateways to the homestead and farm management complex
- sculptures:
  - a) owls on brick fence to homestead "front of house" entry;
  - b) 1952 bull to rear of house (to brick fence near kitchen), by Tom Bass;
  - c) various sculptures around former swimming pool
- remnant orchard trees – pears, mulberries, citrus
- remnant indigenous eucalypts – forest red gums (E.tereticornis) and regrowth.

Plantings

- c. 1820–50 – Campbell family;
- c. 1855–c. 1875 – Davy family;
- 1875–90 – Rudd family;
- 1890–1930 – Rudd family descendants;
- 1930–44 – Swan family;
- 1944–2013 – Fairfax family:
  - a) 1944–52 – Fairfax and Sons P/L
  - b) 1952–90 – Fairfax family
  - c) 1960–70 – Plant and Flower Nursery – Fairfax family
  - d) 1995–2013 – Fairfax family

The homestead is situated in a fine location fairly high on a south-sloping hill commanding a direct view from the homestead south-sou-west to the Razorback Range. At the estate auction in 1852 a race course had been established between the house and Narellan Creek to the south-west. Other views from the homestead or its surrounding gardens to neighbouring estates Orielton, Studley Park, Camden town (St.John's church spire), Camelot / Kirkham etc. are available. The ridgeline to the north cuts off views to Oran Park, Denbigh and Maryland although these are not far away.

Entrances to the property were from both Cowpasture Road (now Camden Valley Way) in roughly the same location as the current entry drive (since altered by residential development), passing across the race course and arriving at the carriage loop in front of the house via the south-west near the stockyards. At that time the estate comprised 800 acres of cleared land, pasture and forest with crop paddocks and a vegetable garden near the house. A second driveway approaches the homestead complex from within the new suburb of Harrington Park, off Parkway Drive / Cobbitty Road/ Oran Park Drive to its north via the new suburb and off the Northern Road to the west. A series of farm dams to the house's south-east have been modified or lost with residential development although the small pond alongside the 1890s realigned driveway remains within open space.

=== Garden ===
Today the garden retains many mature coniferous and other trees most likely planted after 1853 under the Davy ownership, including Araucaria bidwillii (bunya-bunya pine – several giant specimens) and A.cunninghamii (hoop pines – several), Cupressus sempervirens (Mediterranean cypress – several) and a Chinese funeral cypress (C.funebris). In the 1890s major house renovations occurred and a new drive was created that passed an ornamental pond and entered through a picket-fenced gateway to the garden on the east of the house. A number of tall shrubs in the garden bed next to the verandah were removed at this time. Pedestals were added at the foot of the verandah steps. An aerial photograph from c. 1947 (transfer to the Fairfax family) shows the garden as having a defined southern edge with the garden extending east over part of the area shown as garden (kitchen/vegetable garden) and gardener's house on the 1842 map. The racecourse was no longer clear but the cleared alluvial flats were still cleared.

The large circular / elliptical carriage loop south of the homestead is lined with mature trees, predominantly large conifers - these distinguish the homestead group and due to their height and colour, mark its site and can be seen from quite some distance away. These include bunya bunya and hoop pines, Canary Island pines (Pinus canariensis). Non-coniferous species include the native kurrajongs (Brachychiton populneus), Norfolk Island hibiscus / white oak / cow itch tree (Lagunaria patersonia – several), European olive (Olea europaea cv. – several – at least some are nineteenth century) and silky oak (Grevillea robusta), dating from the mid-late nineteenth century. Some shrubs may date from the nineteenth century also, such as pomegranate (Punica granatum cv.).

Later plantings of trees and shrubs date from the early and mid-twentieth century and include plantings made by the Fairfax family. These include more deciduous species such as Chinese elm (Ulmus parvifolia), Chinese pistachio (Pistacia sinensis), swamp cypress (Taxodium distichum), Illawarra flame tree (Brachychiton acerifolius), evergreen species such as African and fruiting olive trees (Olea europaea var. cuspidata and O.e. var. europaea), hedging species such as Italian buckthorn (Rhamnus alaternus), sky flower (Duranta plumieri), large leaved privet (Ligustrum ovalifolium), Cotoneaster species, yellow jasmine (Jasminium humile), oleanders (Nerium oleander cv.s) etc.

Climbing cactus the "dragon fruit" (Hylocereus undatus) from Honduras and Central America climbs over a garden wall near the western entry gate. Clumping orchid cactus (x Disocactus ackermannii cv. scarlet) is underplanted under some of the Mediterranean cypresses to the house's north.

The driveway is of crushed laterite. It has been patched and repaired over the decades with a variety of gravels.

A tennis court in bitumen dating from the 1960s is to the north-east of the homestead and to the east was an area of glasshouses and a former gardener's cottage. A study or retreat built by Sir Warwick Fairfax in the vicinity of the gardener's cottage is secluded by surrounding hedges of African olives, planted by Fairfax (pers.comm., Stuart Read & Lester Tropman, site visit, 7/11/2011).

=== The Harrington Park Homestead Complex ===
The homestead complex consists of the homestead and associated elements and features. The buildings and structures on the site include the following:

- Harrington Park Homestead;
- Garden Study;
- The Studio (Billiard Room);
- Farm Cottages 1 & 2, including swimming pool;
- Farm Storage Sheds 1, 2 & 3;
- Shelter to Pump Station;
- Carriage Loop;
- Arboretum (collection of trees); and
- Part of 1890s arrival drive.

==== Homestead ====
The Homestead comprises a single storey rendered brick vernacular section (1817) and a two-storey single pile Georgian (with later Georgian, Victorian and Modern overlays) rendered brick section which faces south (the earliest part was built between 1817–29 and then faced north).

A triangular pedimented piece above the central steps and columns. The front has an extensive stone-flagged verandah and a deep wooden fascia under the verandah eaves. Beneath the house is an extensive cellar and a remarkable bowed sitting room at the rear (north), which leads out into the garden. During the residency of Sir Warwick Fairfax's family, the place contained contents and collections that related to their cultural pursuits. A kitchen block lies to the west of the main homestead block.

=== Condition ===
As at November, 2005, the residence is in fair condition, but requires extensive works to repair the masonry and joinery. The roof has been renewed to control falling damp and termite detection systems have been installed. The farm cottages and shedding are in fair to good condition. The landscape/garden areas are suffering from the drought. The large trees and generally drought resistant shrubs and perennials are in good condition. The driveway, entry gates, carriage loop and arrival area are in good condition. The garden Studio (Billiard) is in good condition and the Garden Study is in fair condition.

==== Archaeological potential ====
The valued archaeological components of the Homestead Complex include former building sites e.g. the nursery sheds and other farm structures. An 1852 plan of the estate sets out an arrangement of buildings relating to the entry road arriving from the west to the carriage loop at the front of homestead. Areas of the site associated with these early arrangements of structures are important and have archaeological potential. Stables were shown to the east of the loop and stock yards were shown to the west. Footings to the stock yard structures are evident in the service road's western edge. A kitchen building was shown to the north of the homestead and a garden area and gardener's cottage was shown to the east area beyond the stables. Paddocks, fence lines and entry roads were indicated. The site has potential to yield information regarding the other buildings of this 1852 plan.

The Estate has somewhat lost its integrity due to the residential development in the southern portion of the estate. The Homestead Complex, including gardens, garden study, and farm complex, retain their integrity.

=== Modifications and dates ===
The following modifications have been made to the Harrington Park estate:

- 1815 – grant of 2000 acres
- 1828 – 800 acres cleared, 200 in cultivation
- 1829 – sale of part of estate to relative John Douglas Campbell (this later became Oran Park)
- Northeast moiety as defined by Cobbitty Road was leased in 1832 and eventually sold, leaving Cobbitty Road as the estate's northern boundary
- c. 1852 – map shows a gardener's cottage and kitchen garden to the homestead's south-east and a racecourse formed on the lower slope south-west of the homestead towards Narellan Creek.
- Entrances to the property from both Cowpasture Rd (now Camden Valley Way) and Cobbitty Road (now Oran Park Road). The original entrance passed over the later racecourse and arrived at the carriage loop via the south-west near the stockyards.
- 1853+ – Davy made substantial improvements to estate, house and garden, planting much in the latter (see below)
- c. 1860s–90s – photo shows a grassed carriage loop with shrubs or small trees in a garden bed abutting the verandah. Trees are shown in the background to the side of and behind the house.
- 1874–1930s – estate changed from gentleman's seat to a grazing property and homestead
- 1920s–37 – estate leased and run as a dairy farm
- 1982 – Commission of Inquiry recommends that the 320ha in the south-east corner of Harrington Park estate be rezoned from rural to urban – approved by the then Planning Minister, Bob Carr in 1986. 40ha around the house was retained by the Fairfax family.
- c. 1990 – area to the south of Narellan Creek redeveloped in stages as residential suburb named Harrington Park Estate. Stage two of this extends north of Narellan Creek.
- 1997 – a proposal for an altered curtilage around the homestead was rejected by Camden Council.

The following modifications have been made to the Harrington Park homestead:

- 1817 – Original single storey cottage, now kitchen wing
- 1825 – Single pile 2-storey section of homestead to south of original cottage.
- 1830 – Bow front to homestead's northern elevation and dining room
- 1860 – Verandah modifications
- 1890 – Verandah changed to cast iron posts etc. and ogee roof, roof shingles replaced with corrugated iron
- 1930 – Sunroom to north-west elevation
- 1955 – Alterations and additions including west kitchen additions, verandah (front terrace)
- 1967 – Master bedroom and retreat to north-eastern end /elevation of homestead

The following modifications have been made to the garden structures:

- c. 1950 – Studio (Billiard) (c. 1930 converted cottage)
- 1957 – Garden Study
- c. 1960 – Nursery established west of house
- 1967 two pavilion style rooms (master bedroom and retreat) added to the northern side of the house by architect Marcel Weyland.

The following modifications have been made to the garden:

- by 1852 – a race course established between the house and Narellan Creek. At that time the estate comprised 800 acres of cleared land, pasture and forest with crop paddocks and a vegetable garden near the house.
- 1850s–60s – Davy planted many mature coniferous and other trees most likely after 1853, including Araucaria bidwillii (bunya-bunya pines) and A.cunninghamii (hoop pine) and Cupressus sempervirens (Mediterranean cypress).

Other major modifications include:

- 1890s – major house renovations occurred and a new drive created that passed an ornamental pond and entered through a picket-fenced gateway to the garden on the east of the house. A number of tall shrubs in the garden bed next to the verandah were removed at this time. Pedestals were added at the foot of the verandah steps.
- c. 1947 – an aerial photograph (transfer to the Fairfax family) shows the garden as having a defined southern edge with the garden extending east over part of the area shown as garden (kitchen/vegetable garden) and gardener's house on the 1842 map. The racecourse was no longer clear but the cleared alluvial flats were still cleared.

== Heritage listing ==
As at 11 November 2005, Harrington Park is of State significance as one of the earliest "Cow Pasture" homesteads on the Cumberland Plain.

Harrington Park forms part of a grant to the mariner and trader, William Douglas Campbell, by Governor Macquarie in 1815. The homestead built in stages between 1817 and 1827, associated structures, gardens, landscape features, and remnant grazing paddocks have historical, social, aesthetic and technical significance at the State level.

Harrington Park demonstrates the layout of a gentleman's estate with views and vistas afforded to and from the homestead over the landscape and important access routes. The remnant cultural landscape has many features of individual significance such as the original cottage, early homestead, garden, entry drive from the old Cowpastures Road (Camden Valley Way), the 1957 garden studio and the remaining estate area.

Historically the landscape character based on the juxtaposition of a homestead area, with its garden, and cleared pastureland beyond represented an example of this contrast as well as the siting of a homestead group on a landform summit in the Cumberland Plain / Camden area.

The place currently retains some key historical visual relationships – vistas to Orielton, Studley Park, the spire of St. John's Church, Camden and the Razorback Range. Its historical relationship to other nearby early grants (Orielton & Oran Park) and its place in the development of the local area can still be appreciated. The place currently retains its historical local prominence and serves as an important local landmark.

The property has strong associations with members of the ruling class in early NSW and the familial dynasties of the Campbells (1810s–1850s); the Rudds-Brittens (1870s–1920s) and the Fairfax publishing family 1940s–2005).

The place has considerable capacity to demonstrate its development from the early 1810s to the present. It is of considerable scientific interest on account of its archaeological research potential.

Harrington Park was listed on the New South Wales State Heritage Register on 22 December 2006 having satisfied the following criteria.

The place is important in demonstrating the course, or pattern, of cultural or natural history in New South Wales.

Harrington Park estate is of State significance as the main part of a grant to William Douglas Campbell by Governor Macquarie in 1815. This land encompasses the house that Campbell built in stages from 1817 to 1827. The property was part of a landscape dotted with similar gentlemen's properties established on generous grants from colonial governors and lieutenant governors. However, the house is one of the earliest in the vicinity of Cowpastures and one of few 1820s dwellings remaining on the Cumberland Plain.

The homestead at Harrington Park is earlier than the Macarthurs' Camden Park (1840) and only a few years later than their Home Farm cottage, which replaced the rough hut at Belgenny. Although the Harrington Park homestead now shares its land with modern housing estates, it still retains sufficient grounds, farm buildings and improved pastures to demonstrate the style of living enjoyed by gentleman farmers in the early nineteenth century. This area at the edge of the Cumberland Plain represented a landscape where Europeans were physically and mentally comfortable. The large property owners who settled this area and built their impressive houses later were all recreating the situation of a county gentleman in the British Isles. The natural landscape of the Camden/Narellan area reminded these settlers of home and their own enhancement of their grounds increased that similarity.

Harrington Park homestead is significant as a fine example of an upper-class colonial society's model of a Gentleman's Estate from an era when this model was taken seriously. Its perpetuation illustrates the interdependence of pastoral, mercantile and estate modes of life in the nineteenth and twentieth centuries. Harrington Park is a good representative example of a gentleman's estate from 1817 (granted in 1815). The continued adaptive reuse of the residence and the outbuildings is an important part of Harrington Park's history.

The place has a strong or special association with a person, or group of persons, of importance of cultural or natural history of New South Wales's history.

Harrington Park homestead is of State significance for its association with members of the ruling class in early NSW. The grantee William Douglas Campbell was a well-known trader who established the salt pork trade with Tahiti. He was a partner of John Macarthur whose properties were at neighbouring Camden but later earned favour with Governor Macquarie for his part in rescuing the English missionaries from Tahiti.

The Harrington Park homestead complex is significant for its strong associations with the familial dynasties of the Campbells (1810s–1850s), the Rudds-Brittons (1870s–1920s) and the Fairfaxs (1940s–2005). The homestead was established and developed initially by the Campbell family who held the property for almost 40 years until it was sold in 1852 and used as a country house by a number of owners.

The homestead complex is significant for its associations with the squatting age, established when William Rudd Snr, formerly a smallholder from Campbelltown, made his home there after his success with a much larger pastoral lease on the Murrumbidgee. The property was a manifestation of Rudd's upward social mobility. It is also significant for its twentieth-century association with Sir Warwick Fairfax, Chairman of John Fairfax Limited, the family company that had published the Sydney Morning Herald since 1841. Communicating with his office by telephone, Sir Warwick ran the paper while he lived part-time at Harrington Park and used the property as a retreat from his business life. While there, he created literary works including plays that were performed in the early 1950s and a book explaining his "modern, liberal philosophy" in the garden study.

The Harrington Park homestead is significant for its associations with prominent architects including Marcel Weyland (b. 1927) who designed the Asian influenced garden study and pavilions linked to the homestead between 1957 and 1967. The earliest phase of the house has been associated with Francis Greenway but this attribution has yet to be verified.

The estate has significance at the Local level as the location of the murder of Murdoch Campbell, nephew of Captain Campbell, by an escaping convict. This story has been passed down through the generations and has become somewhat of a local legend.

The place is important in demonstrating aesthetic characteristics and/or a high degree of creative or technical achievement in New South Wales.

Harrington Park homestead is of State significance for its ability to demonstrate the layout of an early nineteenth-century gentleman's estate with views and vistas afforded to and from the homestead over the landscape and important access routes.

The Harrington Park has landmark qualities as the homestead, outbuildings and gardens are prominently located on a knoll which dominates the once rural landscape. The homestead complex, with its signal plantings of Bunya and Hoop pines, is visible from The Northern Road and sections of Camden Valley Way. Despite the residential development of much of the Harrington Park Estate, the homestead knoll and remnant cultural landscape is still easily discernable from the major access routes in the area of The Northern Road and Camden Valley Way.

Harrington Park homestead's setting takes advantage of a commanding position in the landscape context of the Camden Valley. This selected position of the homestead shows an understanding of seventeenth- and eighteenth-century Arcadian and Picturesque European landscape ideals. The Homestead's siting was skilfully selected – located on a high knoll with topographical features of hills, alluvial flats, creek lines and distant views to Mount Prudhoe and Razorback Range (the location of a spring on this hill may also have been a deciding factor on the location of the homestead).

The gardens surrounding the homestead are significant for retaining plant specimens and garden layouts associated with their early arrangement. The gardens have been arranged to provide a formal garden setting for the homestead, with its signal plantings of Bunya & Hoop pines and collection of specimen trees and shrubs, providing a distinctive presence of the homestead against the undulating topography.

The garden study (c. 1957) with its copper pagoda style roof and the glass roofed pavilions linked to the homestead (c. 1967) designed by the architect Marcel Weyland introduces a subtle yet distinct Asian influence to the Australian environment. Weyland who was born in Poland grew up in the Jewish community of Shanghai and was interned there by the Japanese during World War II. Weyland's aesthetic sensibility was no doubt influenced by his experiences in China.

The place has a strong or special association with a particular community or cultural group in New South Wales for social, cultural or spiritual reasons.

Harrington Park estate is understood to possess local social and cultural significance to Aboriginal people representing the Cubbitch Barta Title Claimants and the Tharawal Local Aboriginal Land Council.

The Harrington Park estate and Harrington Park Homestead possesses social significance at the local level for the people of Camden as a prominent historic landmark associated with the early colonial history of Camden. It is held in high esteem by groups who value the historic and aesthetic values of the Cowpastures area, and those who have an interest in the early settlement of New South Wales, especially the Cowpasture frontier. Harrington Park Estate was accessible to the public during Sir Warwick Fairfax's ownership by way of open days and the commercial nursery on the estate. The place is also held in high esteem by Camden Council and the National Trust of Australia (NSW).

The site has social significance for the descendants of the familial dynasties that resided at the estate including the Campbells (1810s–1850s); the Rudds-Brittons (1870s–1920s) and the Fairfax publishing family (1940s–2005).

The place has potential to yield information that will contribute to an understanding of the cultural or natural history of New South Wales.

Harrington Park is of State significance for its ability to demonstrate the evolution of an upper-class working estate from early colonial times to the twentieth century. The evolution of the house in terms of its fabric, dimensions and layout, is illustrative of the social and economic standing of its owners within the colony and their resources and the genteel lifestyle to which they aspired.

The homestead gardens and approaches, and vistas from the homestead with managed incident elements in the vistas, demonstrate Australian Colonial garden philosophies from the early and mid-nineteenth century onwards.

The place possesses uncommon, rare or endangered aspects of the cultural or natural history of New South Wales.

Harrington Park is rare at the State level as one of the earliest Gentleman's residences (1817–1827) dating from the Macquarie period on the Cowpasture frontier of the Cumberland Plain.

The place is important in demonstrating the principal characteristics of a class of cultural or natural places/environments in New South Wales.

The Harrington Park estate is of State significance as a fine example of a Gentleman's Estate from the early 1800s. The Harrington Park homestead is a representative example of a substantial Georgian-period Homestead with Victorian and modern-period additions.
