= Alexander Kinghorne =

- Born: Alexander Kinghorn; 15 May 1770; Kelso, Roxburghshire, Scotland
- Died: 16 February 1846 (aged 75); Galashiels, Roxburghshire/Selkirkshire, Scotland
- Burial place: Dryburgh Abbey (unattested)
- Education: Kelso Grammar School
- Occupations: Teacher, factor (estate manager), agriculturalist, surveyor, architect, civil engineer and Australian pastoralist.
- Spouse: Elizabeth Brockie (m. 1793; died 1819)
- Children: 10 (8 survived infancy)
- Parent(s): James Kinghorn and Margaret Eddington

Alexander Kinghorne (15 May 1770 – 16 February 1846) was a Scottish-born surveyor, cartographer, architect, civil engineer and pastoralist who held several government appointments in colonial New South Wales, Australia. Educated at Kelso Grammar School, he began his career as a schoolmaster in the Scottish Borders before becoming an estate manager and developing a professional practice in surveying, agricultural improvement and engineering. His work in Scotland included architectural projects, railway surveys undertaken for Thomas Telford, and the preparation of county maps of Roxburghshire and Selkirkshire. He was a contemporary and associate of the novelist Sir Walter Scott, who provided professional recommendations for him.

Kinghorne emigrated to New South Wales in 1824, where he became Superintendent of the Emu Plains convict establishment (1824–1825), Colonial Civil Engineer (1826), and subsequently supervised building works for the Clergy and School Lands Corporation. He also served as a magistrate and Supreme Court Assessor. From 1827, he established extensive agricultural and pastoral interests around Goulburn, Bathurst and Jervis Bay, laying the foundations for Kinghorne and Chisholm family's pastoral enterprises. He returned to Scotland in 1840 and died at Galashiels in 1846.

== Early life and education (1770–1800) ==
Alexander Kinghorne was born on 15 May 1770 at Kelso, Roxburghshire, Scotland, and baptised on 20 May as Alexander Kinghorn. He was the only child of James Kinghorn (1746–1811), a master tailor, and Margaret Eddington. The Kinghorn family originated in Fife, with ancestors recorded in Dunfermline from the sixteenth century, before settling in the Scottish Borders (2). Alexander adopted the spelling Kinghorne in 1799.

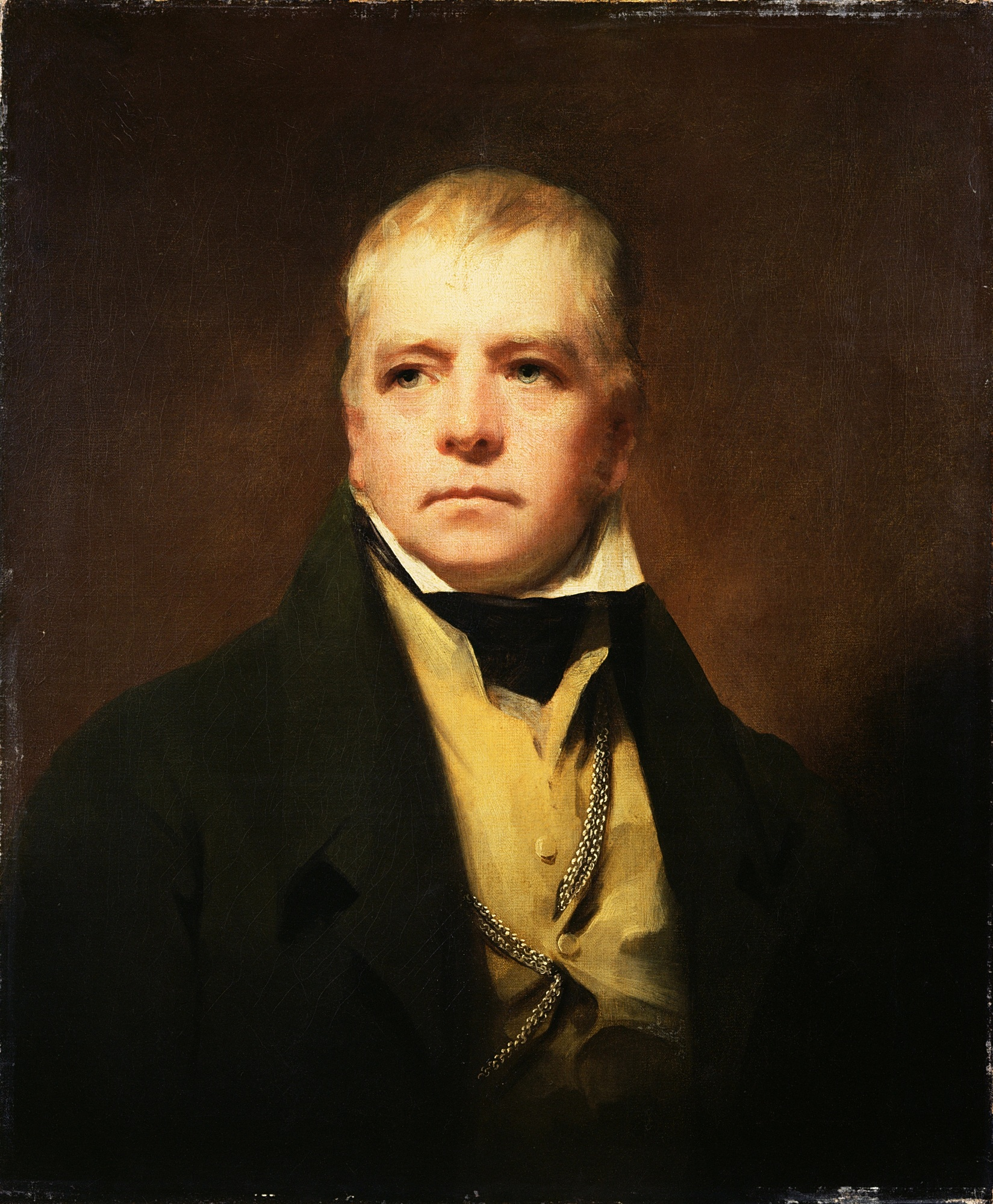
Figure 1. Portrait of Walter Scott (1771 - 1832), novelist and poet, by Sir Henry Raeburn.

His mother died in 1775, when he was five years old. His father subsequently married Ann Smith, with whom he had eight children. James Kinghorn operated a successful tailoring business in Kelso, enabling Alexander to attend Kelso Grammar School. Under its rector, Lancelot Whale, the school provided instruction in classical and modern languages, mathematics and other subjects. In 1783, Kinghorne attended Kelso Grammar School alongside the future novelist and poet Sir Walter Scott (Figure 1) and future publisher James Ballantyne. Kinghorne later described Scott as a classmate and close friend, although the extent of their early friendship is uncertain. Their association continued in later life, when Scott assisted Kinghorne in developing his professional connections.

In 1791, Kinghorne was appointed schoolmaster at Bowden Parish School, near St Boswells, following his presentation by John, Duke of Roxburghe. He taught English, writing, arithmetic, practical mathematics, French, Latin, Greek and geography. The parish's Statistical Account, published in 1795, recorded approximately seventy pupils attending the school. Kinghorne also developed an association with the agricultural innovator Andrew Blaikie of Holydean, who encouraged his interests in surveying and scientific agriculture.

On 31 December 1793, Kinghorne married Elizabeth (Betty) Brockie (1769–1819) at Mertoun. She was the daughter of William Brockie, a tenant farmer on the Haig family's Bemersyde estate. The marriage established connections with the Haig and Elliot families, which subsequently assisted Kinghorne's career. The couple lived in the Bowden schoolhouse, where their first three children were born: James (1794), William (1796) and Helen (1798). They eventually had ten children, of which eight survived infancy. By the end of the eighteenth century, Kinghorne had established himself as a schoolmaster while developing the mathematical, agricultural and surveying interests he subsequently pursued professionally.

== Factor of the Kippilaw estate (1799–1813) ==
In 1799, Alexander Kinghorne was appointed factor (estate manager) to John Seton Karr (1741–1815), proprietor of the Kippilaw estate near Bowden, Roxburghshire. The estate comprised approximately 800 acres, including Kippilaw Mains, Bowden Moor and Bowden Mill Farm. Kinghorne's appointment marked his transition from teaching to estate management, agriculture and surveying.

Following the death of Andrew Ramsay Karr in January 1799, Kinghorne prepared a detailed survey and financial inventory of the estate for its new proprietor. He subsequently assumed responsibility for its management, initially combining these duties with his position as schoolmaster at Bowden. By June 1800, he had relinquished his teaching appointment and moved with his family to Kippilaw Mains.

=== Agricultural and estate improvements ===
Figure 2. Kippilaw Mains Farmhouse, 2014.

Kinghorne undertook an extensive programme of agricultural improvements at Kippilaw, introducing crop rotation, improved pasture species, fertilisers and new methods of cultivation. Influenced by Andrew Blaikie, he reorganised fields, improved drainage, constructed boundary walls and developed livestock breeding programmes. These included experiments with Teeswater cattle and West Highland stock obtained from the Duke of Argyll. He also supervised substantial improvements to the estate's buildings and infrastructure. These included a new carriageway and entrance gates, stables, a coach house, farm buildings and the reconstruction of his own farmhouse at Kippilaw Mains (Figure 2). Between 1807 and 1811, he directed extensive renovations to the Kippilaw Mansion, developing practical experience in architectural design and construction.

=== Surveying and antiquarian interests ===
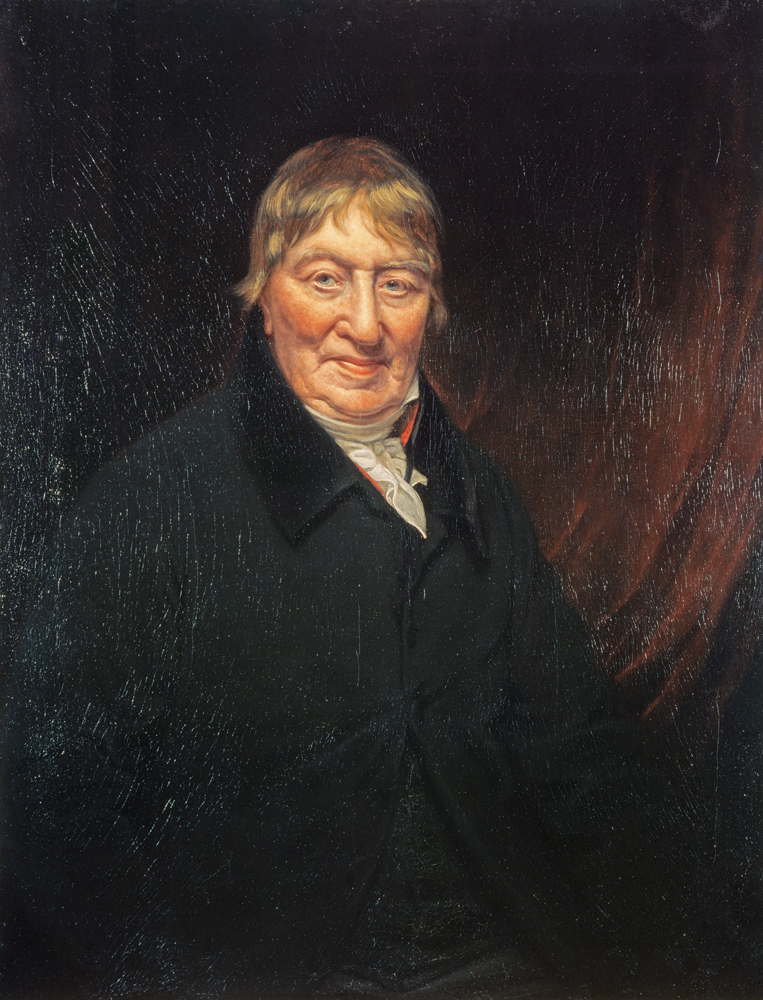
Figure 3. Portrait of George Chalmers (1742–1825), Scottish antiquarian and writer.

Alongside his estate duties, Kinghorne undertook independent commissions as a land surveyor and held responsibilities as County Fiscal and Road Surveyor for Roxburghshire, with responsibilities for roads, bridges and standards of measurement. In 1803, he conducted a survey of ancient roads and fortifications for the antiquarian George Chalmers (Figure 3), who incorporated his findings into his book Caledonia. Chalmers praised Kinghorne's work, although subsequent archaeological investigations have questioned some of his identifications of Roman remains.

Kinghorne also designed and supervised a drainage scheme to reclaim the Marle Moss, involving extensive underground excavation through rock. Completed in 1805, the project provided additional agricultural land and materials for soil improvement, although its costs exceeded initial expectations.

=== Departure from Kippilaw ===
Despite these improvements, relations between Kinghorne and Seton Karr became increasingly strained. Rising expenditure, declining rental income and disagreements over estate management contributed to financial difficulties. Kinghorne also experienced disputes with domestic staff, while his wife suffered prolonged illness. In 1812, Seton Karr decided to lease Kippilaw Mains, substantially reducing the need for a resident factor. Kinghorne relinquished his position between August and December 1812 and was succeeded by William Foggo. In May 1813, the Kinghorne family moved to Crossflat Farm, between Maxton and St Boswells.

After leaving Kippilaw, Kinghorne continued his surveying and engineering work independently.

== Surveyor, architect and civil engineer (1800–1824) ==
While employed as factor of the Kippilaw estate, Alexander Kinghorne developed a private surveying practice, undertaking commissions for landowners throughout the Scottish Borders. His principal patron was John Seton Karr, who recommended him to aristocratic clients, including the Dukes of Roxburghe and Lord Minto.

Figure 4. Scott's View, showing Gledswood House (right).

Kinghorne's work increasingly extended beyond land measurement into agricultural improvement, architectural design and construction. In 1803, he surveyed the Gledswood estate for Colonel William Sibbald and subsequently designed and supervised the construction of Gledswood House, near “Scott’s View” in Berwickshire, completed around 1805 (Figure 4). At this time, his former schoolmate, Sir Walter Scott, also employed Kinghorne professionally. As Sheriff-Depute of Selkirkshire, Scott employed Kinghorne as a surveyor in legal disputes involving property boundaries and land measurements. Their association continued as Kinghorne sought to establish himself professionally.

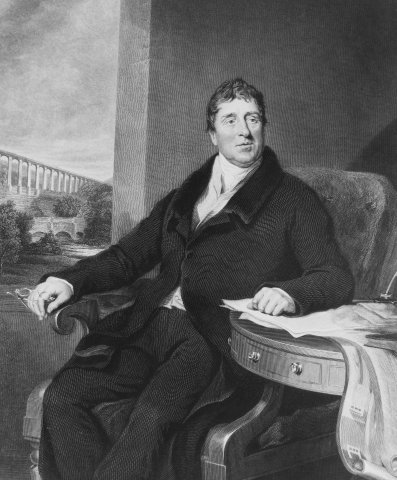
Figure 5. Thomas Telford, Civil Engineer in 1838. Engraved by W. Raddon from a painting by S. Lane.

Through Seton Karr, Kinghorne also developed connections with two prominent civil engineers, John Rennie and Thomas Telford. In 1809, Telford (Figure 5) commissioned him to survey the line of the Glasgow–Berwick railway, a proposed horse-drawn railway intended to connect the Lanarkshire coalfields with eastern Scotland. Kinghorne surveyed sections of the route through Berwickshire, Roxburghshire and Peeblesshire, and was acknowledged on Telford's published railway plan of 1810. He subsequently undertook further surveying work associated with Rennie's proposed Berwick–Kelso railway. Neither scheme proceeded to construction. From 1813, he increasingly described himself professionally as a civil engineer.

Figure 6. David Steuart Erskine, 11th Earl of Bucan (1736–1785), by Henry Raeburn.

Kinghorne also received support from David Steuart Erskine, 11th Earl of Buchan (Figure 6), whose interests in agriculture, antiquities and scientific improvement closely corresponded with Kinghorne's.In 1818, Buchan invited him to examine plans, surveys and estimates for the proposed Erie Canal in the United States. Kinghorne submitted a favourable assessment to Governor DeWitt Clinton of New York, subsequently published in an American newspaper, endorsing the engineering surveys while acknowledging his inability to assess the financial projections.

Figure 7. Plan of County of Roxburghshire attested by Alexander Kinghorne, James Kinghorne, George Cranston and John Clark. Printed by John Thomson, Edinburgh, 1822.

Following his departure from Kippilaw in 1813, Kinghorne established himself at St Boswells, continuing his surveying and engineering practice. His cartographic work included county maps of Roxburghshire (1822) (Figure 7) and Selkirkshire (1824), published by John Thomson of Edinburgh. Assisted by his eldest son James, Kinghorne contributed detailed surveys showing settlements, roads, waterways, estates and topographical features. The Selkirkshire map was prepared under the patronage of Lord Napier, alongside other surveyors, including Thomas Mitchell.

Kinghorne's wife, Elizabeth (Betty) Brockie, died on 20 August 1819 following a prolonged illness and was buried at Dryburgh Abbey. Her death prompted him to reconsider his family's future and professional prospects. By the early 1820s, he decided to emigrate to New South Wales. The Earl of Buchan, Scott and Sir Henry Hay Macdougall, 4^{th} Baronet of Mackerston, supported his ambitions. Macdougall's son-in-law, Sir Thomas Brisbane, subsequently became Governor of New South Wales in 1821.

John Seton Karr had died in 1815, while the Earl of Buchan died in 1829. Sir Walter Scott died in September 1832. In February 1833, Kinghorne recorded a personal tribute to Scott in his annotated copy of The Monastery, recalling their friendship and the burial of his wife at Dryburgh Abbey, where Scott and Buchan were also interred.

== Emigration to New South Wales (1821-1824) ==
Alexander Kinghorne’s decision to emigrate was influenced by declining professional opportunities in Scotland, financial difficulties and the prospect of securing government employment and agricultural land in the colony. Sir Walter Scott encouraged his plans, while Kinghorne sought assistance from his professional and personal contacts. In May 1821, he wrote to Major-General Sir Herbert Taylor, Military Secretary to the Duke of York, requesting patronage for his two eldest sons, James and William. He described their qualifications in surveying, agriculture and navigation, enclosing examples of their cartographic work. His supporting references included Sir Walter Scott, Lord Buchan, Sir Henry Hay Macdougall, Colonel William Elliot Lockhart and George Chalmers of the Board of Trade.

James and William Kinghorne departed Scotland aboard the Castle Forbes in August 1821, arriving at Hobart Town in February 1822. William secured an appointment as a ship's master in the colonial marine service of Lieutenant-Governor William Sorell. James continued to Sydney, arriving on 26 April 1822, and was appointed Assistant Superintendent of the government convict establishment at Emu Plains, commencing duties on 1 June.

Following his sons’ appointments in the colony, Kinghorne sought permission to emigrate with his remaining family. Lord Buchan became his principal advocate, corresponding with Governor Brisbane and Earl Bathurst, Secretary of State for War and the Colonies. Buchan also assembled recommendations from Scott and Chalmers supporting Kinghorne's application. In July 1823, Scott informed Buchan that Bathurst had authorised a grant of 1,000 acres for Kinghorne. The official instructions to Brisbane provided for a land grant proportionate to Kinghorne's means of cultivation.

Kinghorne departed Leith aboard the Portland on 1 April 1824, accompanied by five of his children: Alexander junior, John Ker, Helen, Elizabeth and Isabella. His son Andrew Seton, who had married and established himself in the Scottish wool industry, remained in Scotland. Before departure, Kinghorne wrote to Andrew describing his financial difficulties and the family's uncertain prospects. During the voyage he maintained correspondence with his son, including letters written from the Orkney Islands and Rio de Janeiro.

The Portland arrived at Hobart Town on 10 September 1824, where Kinghorne was reunited with William. Presenting his letters of introduction to Lieutenant-Governor George Arthur, he was commissioned on 23 September to survey Brighton, north of Hobart, and assess its suitability as a proposed new colonial capital. Accompanied by one of his sons and assisted by government servants, he examined the terrain, water supplies, building materials and potential town layout. His favourable report, submitted on 30 September, recommended Brighton as a suitable site, although the proposed relocation of the capital was never implemented.

Kinghorne and his family departed Hobart on 3 October, arriving in Sydney on 16 October 1824. He presented his recommendations from Buchan, Scott and Macdougall to Governor Brisbane. His appointment as Superintendent of the Emu Plains convict establishment had already been approved, with the official notice dated 9 September, before his arrival in Australia.

Shortly after reaching Sydney, Kinghorne became acquainted with James Chisholm, a Scottish-born merchant and former regimental tailor. Their friendship subsequently provided Kinghorne with an important personal and social connection within the colony.

== Superintendent at Emu Plains (1824-1826) ==
Alexander Kinghorne took up his appointment as Superintendent of the Emu Plains convict establishment on 29 December 1824, accompanied by five of his children. The family occupied the substantial two-storey brick residence known as Government House, built during Governor Lachlan Macquarie's administration. Established in 1819, the government farm comprised approximately 2,000 acres and accommodated several hundred convicts engaged in agricultural production and associated industries.

Kinghorne succeeded Peter Murdoch, whose administration had emphasised discipline and punishment. According to historian Lorraine Stacker, Kinghorne introduced a more compassionate approach, combining discipline with encouragement of productive work and rehabilitation. His principal officers included Assistant Superintendent John Stewart, overseer Joseph Peters, storekeeper James Scott and tobacco overseer Christopher Dodding. The establishment cultivated wheat, maize, tobacco, potatoes and other crops, while maintaining livestock and supplying provisions to government institutions and convict work gangs. It also served as an important staging point between Sydney and the western settlements at Bathurst and Wellington Valley. Kinghorne supervised its administration, maintained regular correspondence with the Colonial Secretary and submitted monthly returns recording personnel, livestock, agricultural production and supplies.

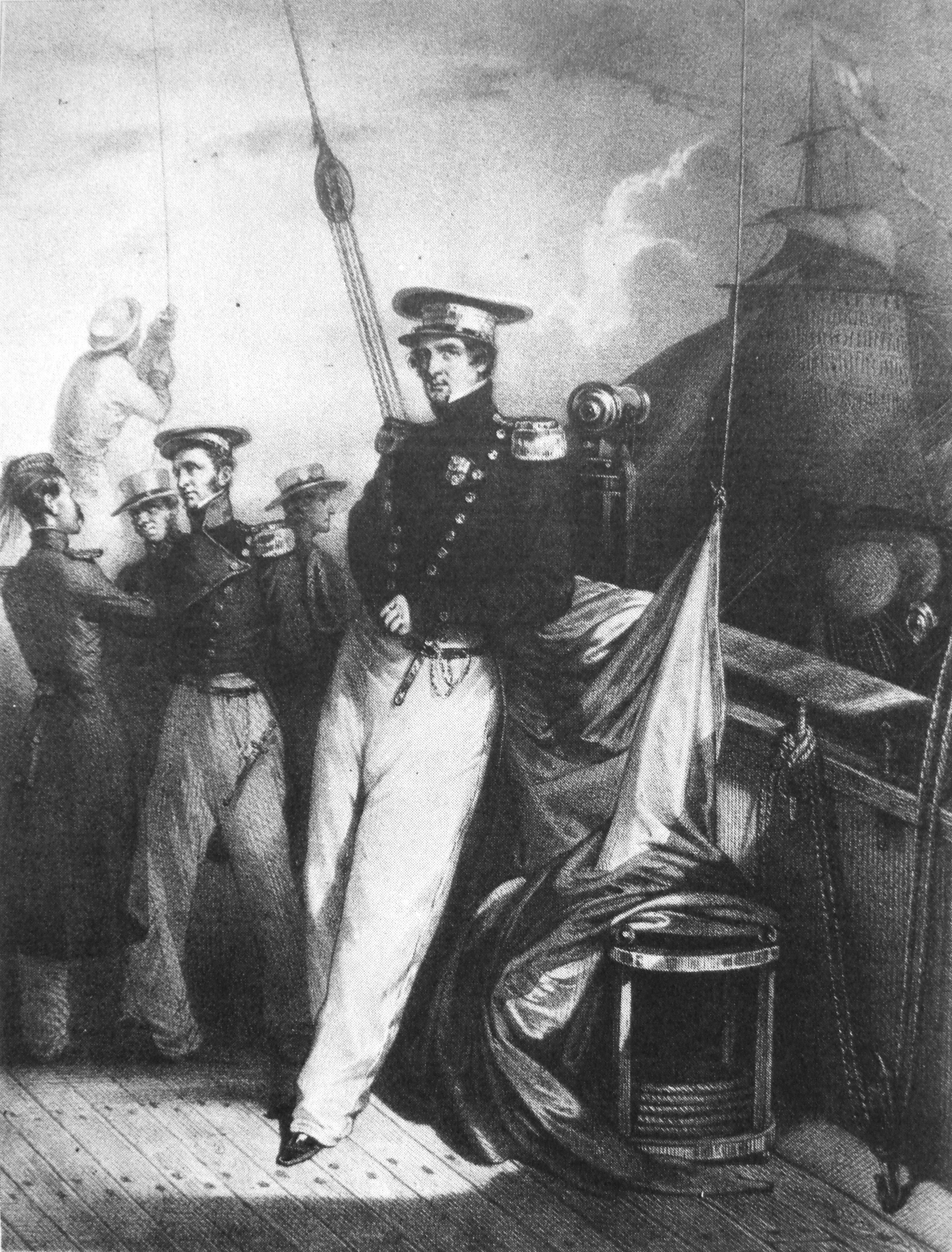
Figure 8. Hyacinthe de Bougainville, Circa 1830.

Governor Sir Thomas Brisbane regarded Emu Plains as an important agricultural and reform institution. During Kinghorne's superintendence, the establishment continued to attract favourable assessments for its productivity and management. In August 1825, the French naval explorer Baron Hyacinthe de Bougainville (Figure 8) visited Emu Plains and described it as well organised, observing that the convicts appeared healthy, disciplined and reasonably contented. He praised Kinghorne as an enterprising and knowledgeable administrator.

During Kinghorne's administration he supported theatrical performances by convicts. In May 1825, he permitted the construction of a rudimentary theatre, subsequently known as the Emu Theatre. Its productions included The Mock Doctor, Bombastes Furioso and The Lying Valet. Performances attracted local settlers and visitors from Sydney, including Sir John Jamison and members of the Blaxland family. Bougainville attended a performance in August 1825 as Kinghorne's guest. The theatre attracted considerable attention in the colonial newspapers but was discontinued under the austere Governor Ralph Darling in 1826. Kinghorne also encouraged the artistic abilities of the French convict Théodore Constantini, whom Bougainville encountered during his visit. Bougainville subsequently interceded with Governor Brisbane on Constantini's behalf, contributing to his pardon in August 1825.

During Kinghorne's tenure, a government commission investigated allegations of improper relations between male and female convicts at Emu Plains during the preceding administration. His eldest son James, formerly Assistant Superintendent, gave evidence concerning the separation and supervision of the prisoners. The commission rejected allegations that women had been deliberately sent to the establishment for prostitution, although evidence indicated that unauthorised relationships had occurred.

Kinghorne continued to pursue opportunities in civil engineering. In June 1825, following uncertainty over the proposed relocation of the Van Diemen's Land capital to Brighton, which he had surveyed in 1824, he applied to Governor Brisbane for appointment to the colony's land valuation board. The proposed relocation was subsequently abandoned. Kinghorne also surveyed the Emu Plains establishment, producing detailed plans dated January 1826. Preserved in the State Archives of New South Wales, these record the farm's buildings, paddocks, agricultural activities, roads and the course of the Nepean River. The plans document the buildings and infrastructure of the settlement.

== Colonial Civil Engineer and architectural work (1826-1827) ==
Following the death of Major John Ovens in December 1825, Alexander Kinghorne was appointed Colonial Civil Engineer by Governor Ralph Darling, effective 10 January 1826. He was also appointed to the newly established Land Board, alongside Lieutenant-Governor William Stewart and Colonial Auditor William Lithgow. His son James succeeded him as Superintendent of the Emu Plains convict establishment. As Civil Engineer, Kinghorne was responsible for the construction, maintenance and repair of government buildings throughout New South Wales, together with aspects of urban drainage and public infrastructure. His appointment to the Land Board ended on 17 February 1826, when the demands of his engineering responsibilities were judged incompatible with its work.

Kinghorne undertook several public works projects, including repairs to government buildings in Sydney and Parramatta. He prepared plans for enlarging the Colonial Secretary's residence in Macquarie Place and, at government request, produced a report and financial estimates for introducing gas street lighting to Sydney. Although the lighting scheme was not implemented during his tenure, his 1826 report was subsequently consulted by the Australian Gas Light Company when preparing its prospectus in 1836.

Kinghorne's appointment as Civil Engineer was short-lived. Governor Darling expressed dissatisfaction with his administrative performance, describing him as a man of scientific knowledge who lacked the necessary managerial skills. In May 1826, Kinghorne was replaced by Captain William Dumaresq, Darling's brother-in-law. The official announcement presented the change as a transfer to other duties.

Kinghorne subsequently obtained employment with the newly established Clergy and School Lands Corporation (CSLC), which administered lands intended to support Anglican clergy and education. In May 1826, he approached Archdeacon Thomas Scott, proposing that the corporation employ him to supervise land valuation, improvements and building works. Following discussions with the corporation's trustees, he was engaged in September on a part-time contract worth £250 annually.

His principal responsibility was the planning and construction of a new Male Orphan School at Bull's Hill, near Liverpool, on the Cabramatta orphan school estate. Working with the Reverend Robert Cartwright, Kinghorne selected the site, prepared architectural plans and estimates, obtained building materials and supervised construction. His designs included the schoolmaster's residence, dormitories, dining room and a bridge across Cabramatta Creek. He also advised on repairs to St Luke's Church, Liverpool, and the establishment of a school at Castlereagh.

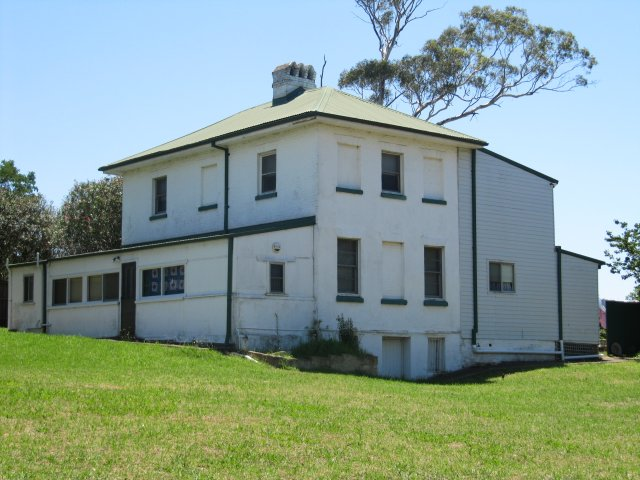
Figure 9, Bonnyrigg House, architect Alexander Kinghone.

Construction at Bull's Hill was interrupted when the corporation suspended the works in January 1827. Kinghorne's employment ended on 17 January, although construction subsequently continued under Cartwright's supervision, using Kinghorne's plans. The surviving schoolmaster's residence, Bonnyrigg House, is an important example of early colonial Georgian architecture (Figure 9). The Heritage Council of New South Wales identifies Kinghorne as its architect and describes the building as the only surviving example of his architectural work.

During 1827, Kinghorne and his family relocated from Emu Plains to Liverpool, where he rented agricultural land associated with Drummond Farm. He increasingly concentrated on farming and acquiring land for his family.

== The Sudds-Thompson affair (1826-1835) ==
In November 1826, the death of Private Joseph Sudds, a soldier of the 57^{th} Regiment of Foot, provoked a political controversy that subsequently involved Alexander Kinghorne's two sons, James and Alexander junior. The affair became a dispute against the administration of Governor Ralph Darling.

Figure 10. Cartoon of neck collar and irons worn by Privates Sudds and Thompson, 1826 (Edward Smith Hall: Refutation of Lieutenant-General Darling).

Sudds and another soldier, Patrick Thompson, had deliberately stolen twelve yards of calico in the expectation that conviction and transportation would secure their discharge from the army. On 8 November 1826, both were sentenced to seven years transportation. Darling subsequently ordered their public degradation before their regiment at Wynyard Barracks, where they were stripped of their uniforms, dressed as convicts and placed in specially manufactured irons comprising neck collars connected by chains to ankle shackles. (Figure 10) Their sentences were commuted to hard labour, after which they were to return to military service.

Sudds, who had previously been admitted to hospital, became ill again and died on 27 November 1826. His death prompted widespread criticism of Darling, particularly from Robert Wardell, editor of The Australian, and the barrister William Charles Wentworth. The controversy centred on the legality of Darling's punishment and whether the weight and design of the irons had contributed to Sudds' death. Following Sudds' death, Thompson was required to wear the same irons before being transferred to a road gang near Emu Plains. James Kinghorne, who had succeeded his father as Superintendent of the convict establishment in January 1826, received instructions through Captain William Dumaresq to remove Thompson's irons. They were subsequently stored in the Superintendent's residence, where Alexander Kinghorne senior and other family members were still living.

In May or June 1827, Captain Robert Robison and several military officers visited Emu Plains and examined the irons. Robison later claimed that they weighed approximately 40 pounds or more, considerably exceeding the government's stated weight of about 14 pounds. The discrepancy became important during renewed investigations in 1829. James Kinghorne gave evidence before the Executive Council on 7 May 1829, identifying the irons and confirming that Robison had tried them on and had been able to lie down and turn while wearing them. James estimated their weight at between twelve and fourteen pounds. Alexander Kinghorne junior appeared before the Council on 14 May 1829. He independently identified the irons and corroborated his brother's testimony. He recalled demonstrating their relatively modest weight by holding them at arm's length, disputing another officer's estimate of sixty pounds. The brothers' evidence challenged Robison's account and became relevant to subsequent parliamentary investigations into Darling's administration. In 1835, Robison again disputed their testimony before a House of Commons select committee. The parliamentary proceedings ultimately resulted in Darling's exoneration.

Alexander Kinghorne senior was not called to give evidence, and his personal views on the controversy are undocumented. Both his sons gave evidence that challenged Robison's account, and defended the governor who had dismissed their father as Colonial Civil Engineer in May 1826.

== Judicial and civic appointments (1825–1840) ==
Alexander Kinghorne served in the judicial system of New South Wales for approximately fifteen years, acting as a Justice of the Peace, local magistrate, juror and Supreme Court Assessor. He was first appointed a Justice of the Peace by Governor Sir Thomas Brisbane on 12 November 1825 and was reappointed in June 1827. Following his relocation to Liverpool that year, he became an active member of the local bench of magistrates, regularly sitting alongside Thomas Moore. Kinghorne continued to receive appointments as a Justice of the Peace until 1840. The Liverpool magistrates exercised considerable judicial authority, hearing minor criminal and civil cases and supervising aspects of local administration.

Kinghorne also appeared frequently as a witness in criminal proceedings, particularly providing character references for former convicts who had been under his supervision at Emu Plains. In October 1826, he testified on behalf of Joseph Peters, an overseer accused of attempting to influence witnesses in a criminal prosecution. Peters was acquitted. In May 1829, Kinghorne gave favourable character evidence for Alexander Dick, a silversmith whom he had met during his voyage to Australia in 1824. Dick was nevertheless convicted of receiving stolen silverware belonging to Colonial Secretary Alexander Macleay.

Kinghorne's jury service began at the Windsor Court of Quarter Sessions, where he served on a grand jury in January 1827 alongside his son James. Between 1830 and 1833, he served as a special juror in the Supreme Court, occasionally acting as foreman. His service brought him into regular contact with Chief Justice Francis Forbes and justices James Dowling and John Stephen.

In June 1833, Kinghorne was appointed an Assessor in the Supreme Court, sitting alongside a judge to determine civil disputes. His first recorded appearance was with Justice Dowling on 12 June 1833 in Lyons v. Lyons, a case concerning the recovery of money. He subsequently heard cases involving debts, contractual disputes, trespass and damages. He continued serving as an assessor until 1839, although his appearances became less frequent after 1835.

Kinghorne's magisterial duties occasionally attracted public controversy. In August 1830, his imprisonment of Michael Finnigan for assaulting a Liverpool constable was criticised in The Monitor. In October 1837, he was involved in a dispute over the use of Liverpool Courthouse for religious services, when the Wesleyan minister Daniel Draper was prevented from conducting a service because the building had been allocated to a Presbyterian congregation. The incident generated critical correspondence in colonial newspapers.

Kinghorne also participated in civic affairs. In 1833, he joined the Liverpool General Petition Committee advocating constitutional reform. He attended the opening of Lansdowne Bridge in January 1836 and became a trustee of Liverpool Town Common in 1837.

== Pastoral and agricultural interests (1827-1840) ==
Between 1827 and 1840, Alexander Kinghorne established extensive agricultural and pastoral interests in New South Wales, principally near Goulburn, Bathurst and Jervis Bay. His objective was to secure land and livelihoods for his children through a network of properties devoted to farming, livestock production, milling and maritime transport.

=== Cardross and the Goulburn Plains ===
Kinghorne's principal estate was Cardross, situated approximately six miles west of Goulburn, in the County of Argyle. Its location had been recommended by James Chisholm junior, who subsequently became his son-in-law. It comprised his first land grant of 2,000 acres, which was approved by Governor Brisbane in November 1825, following representations emphasising his agricultural experience in Scotland and service at Emu Plains. He took possession in 1828, naming the property after the title held by his Scottish patron, the Earl of Buchan. Kinghorne subsequently claimed entitlement to additional land, based on earlier Colonial Office correspondence and government promises. These claims resulted in prolonged disputes over two further reserves of 2,000 and 1,000 acres. The former became a grant to his son, James, which he named Maxton. The latter became known as Cardross Grange, although its legal ownership remained unresolved in his lifetime.

=== Marriage of Elizabeth Kinghorne ===
Figure 11. Elizabeth Margaret Chisholm (née Kinghorne), 1808-1894; studio photograph circa 1846.

On 9 June 1829, Kinghorne's daughter Elizabeth Margaret married James Chisholm junior at Liverpool (Figure 11). The ceremony was conducted by the Presbyterian minister John Dunmore Lang, with both fathers witnessing the marriage. The Chisholms subsequently acquired substantial land adjoining Cardross along the Wollondilly River. Elizabeth received a marriage grant of 1,280 acres in 1831, and the couple constructed a substantial homestead, completed in 1836. She named their consolidated estate Kippilaw, after the Scottish property where she had been born and where her father had formerly been estate factor.

=== Pastoral expansion ===
Cardross developed under the management of Kinghorne's sons John Ker and James, assisted by Joseph Peters, formerly an overseer at Emu Plains. By 1828, the property supported cattle, sheep and cultivated land. In 1830, Kinghorne obtained a licence to graze livestock on an additional 4,000 acres. The family expanded its holdings through James's 2,240-acre Maxton grant in 1833 and the purchase of the 960-acre Strathern property in 1837. In 1835, Kinghorne also obtained leases totalling 10,010 acres along the Boorowa River, subsequently developed as Cucumgilliga.

By 1836, the Goulburn properties supported approximately 3,000 sheep, 800 cattle and substantial wheat production. They employed around forty convict workers and overseers, while a wind-powered flour mill at Cardross processed grain for local farmers.

=== Bathurst properties and family developments ===
Kinghorne also acquired land near Bathurst for his son Alexander junior, a millwright. In 1835, he obtained 1,221 acres adjoining Raineville, naming the property St Boswells. Alexander junior constructed water-powered flour mills at Raineville and St Boswells. Alexander junior married Jane Lambert in December 1834, but she died during childbirth in September 1837. His subsequent financial difficulties culminated in insolvency in 1841.

In 1830, James Kinghorne assisted Surveyor-General Thomas Mitchell in exploring the Wellington Caves, where fossil remains, including those of Diprotodon, were collected.

Kinghorne's daughter Helen returned from Scotland in 1835, surviving the wreck of the Wallace near Hobart. She married William Moir, an assistant to the Colonial Architect, in June 1836. Kinghorne's son William Kinghorne, formerly a colonial marine captain in Van Diemen's Land, returned to New South Wales in November 1836.

=== Jervis Bay and the Shoalhaven ===
Kinghorne planned to establish a chain of properties extending from Bathurst through Goulburn to Jervis Bay, enabling livestock and produce to reach Sydney by sea. His principal coastal property, Mount Jervis, comprised approximately 2,560 acres on the northern shores of Jervis Bay. Originally promised to Robert Lambert, it was occupied by the Kinghornes from 1839, although formally transferred in 1841. In a letter published in Chambers's Edinburgh Journal in January 1840, Kinghorne described ambitious plans for Mount Jervis, including vineyards, an orangery, grazing paddocks, an observatory and a substantial residence. The extent to which these improvements were completed is uncertain.

The letter also described the family's dealings with an Aboriginal leader named Wagamy, whose community supplied fish, game and other services. Kinghorne's account provides evidence of interaction between European settlers and Aboriginal people around Jervis Bay, although the acquisition of colonial estates occurred within a broader process of Indigenous dispossession.

In February 1840, Kinghorne secured a further 666 acres at Saltwater Creek, near its junction with the Shoalhaven River, intended as a resting place for livestock travelling to Jervis Bay.

=== Final years in New South Wales ===
From 1838, Kinghorne spent increasing periods at his properties near Goulburn. He helped establish the town's first Presbyterian church, serving on its building committee, and occasionally acting as police magistrate. By early 1840, he had largely transferred management of his properties to his children. He prepared to return to Scotland after sixteen years in New South Wales. Approaching seventy and suffering ill health, he had established substantial pastoral interests for his family. His sons James, William and John Ker were managing the properties around Goulburn and Jervis Bay, while his daughters Helen and Elizabeth were married and Isabella remained with her brothers at Maxton.

Figure 12. Gledswood homestead, Narellan, NSW.

In January 1839, Kinghorne arranged to sell his Liverpool residence and moved to Gledswood at Narellan in New South Wales, the home of his daughter Elizabeth and son-in-law James Chisholm junior (Figure 12). He transferred management of his rural estates to his sons under lease arrangements, expecting to receive income from the properties during his retirement.

== Final years (1840-1846) ==
=== Return to Scotland (1840) ===
Kinghorne departed Sydney aboard the Trusty, commanded by Captain Alexander Jamieson, on 21 March 1840. After rounding Cape Horn and calling at Bahia, Brazil, the vessel reached Deal, Kent, on 28 August. By November, Kinghorne was staying with his brother-in-law William Brockie in Edinburgh.

=== Financial difficulties (1841–1844) ===
By June 1841, Kinghorne had moved to Galashiels, where his son Andrew Seton Kinghorne was a millwright and operated an engineering business. He initially lodged with William Brown, another local millwright.

Kinghorne's retirement in Scotland coincided with severe economic difficulties in Britain and New South Wales. The depression of the early 1840s affected the Scottish Borders textile industry, while falling wool and livestock prices, reduced British investment and restricted bank credit undermined the colonial pastoral economy. His Australian properties consequently produced little income, and expected remittances from his sons were delayed. The insolvency of Alexander Kinghorne junior in 1841 further strained family finances. Andrew Seton's engineering business in Galashiels was also affected by declining textile production and changes in manufacturing technology. The collapse of the Edinburgh and Leith Banking Company in 1842, together with the associated failure of the Galashiels Savings Bank, compounded Kinghorne's difficulties.

A remittance of £200 from his son-in-law William Moir eventually enabled him to discharge debts owed to George Craig, a local banker.

Meanwhile, the failure of the Bank of Australia in 1843 created further liabilities for the family. Kinghorne owned ten shares, which eventually attracted calls totalling £720. His son William Kinghorne managed these obligations through a mortgage on his Saltwater Creek property at Nowra.

=== Declining health and death (1843–1846) ===
Kinghorne's health deteriorated during his final years. In November 1843, he was living at St Patrick's Square, Edinburgh, but returned to Galashiels the following month. During 1844, he sought medical treatment, including a visit to the mineral springs at Bridge of Allan. He became seriously ill at Alloa, possibly suffering a stroke, and was assisted by James Moir, brother of his son-in-law William. He subsequently returned to Galashiels.

Despite his declining health, Kinghorne continued occasional professional activities. In March 1844, Sir Henry Fairfax consulted him concerning a property dispute involving the Maxton estate and the Duke of Roxburghe, drawing upon Kinghorne's earlier surveying work in the Scottish Borders.

Alexander Kinghorne died at Galashiels on 16 February 1846, aged 75. Australian newspapers published a brief death notice describing him as a respected former colonist and magistrate. His Scottish estate was valued at £341 19s. 5d. His will divided his New South Wales properties principally among his sons James, William and John Ker. Monetary bequests were made to his daughters Helen, Elizabeth and Isabella, his grandson William Alexander Chisholm and another grandson, Alexander Kinghorne III. Isabella also received 300 breeding ewes in recognition of her care for her father. Alexander junior was excluded from the principal inheritance, while Andrew Seton Kinghorne had received £300 during his father's lifetime. Andrew Seton administered the Scottish estate, with the assistance of solicitors Robert Haldane and Hugh Lees. Settlement of the estate continued into 1847.

Alexander Kinghorne's burial place is uncertain, although he recorded his right to a plot at Dryburgh Abbey. While his wife, Elizabeth Brockie, had been buried there in 1819, no surviving burial record or identifiable grave has been found for Alexander.

== Legacy ==
=== Professional legacy ===
Kinghorne's career encompassed teaching, estate management, land surveying, cartography, architecture, civil engineering, agricultural improvement, pastoralism and colonial administration. As factor of the Kippilaw estate in Roxburghshire, he introduced agricultural improvements, drainage works, livestock breeding and new buildings. His projects included a major renovation of the Kippilaw mansion and estate infrastructure. Some of these projects exceeded their original budgets.

His architectural work in Scotland included Kippilaw Mains house, the Kippilaw coach house, Kippilaw Mansion, Gledswood House in Berwickshire, and the renovation of Maxton Kirk. His surveying achievements included the county maps of Roxburghshire and Selkirkshire, together with railway surveys under Thomas Telford.

In New South Wales, Kinghorne served as Superintendent of the Emu Plains convict establishment from 1824 to 1826. His management emphasised agricultural productivity, discipline and the rehabilitation of convicts. Contemporary accounts, including that of the French explorer Hyacinthe de Bougainville, described the establishment favourably. His appointment as Colonial Civil Engineer in 1826 was brief, but his subsequent work for the Clergy and School Lands Corporation included the design of buildings for the Male Orphan School near Liverpool. Bonnyrigg House survives as an example of his colonial architectural work.

Kinghorne also contributed to colonial public life through his service as a Justice of the Peace, Liverpool magistrate, Supreme Court juror and Assessor.

=== Religion and public life ===
Kinghorne was a Presbyterian who supported congregations at Liverpool and Goulburn and helped establish Goulburn's first Presbyterian church. In 1837, Kinghorne was involved in a dispute concerning the use of Liverpool Courthouse for Wesleyan religious services, which attracted criticism in colonial newspapers.

In 1833, Kinghorne joined the Liverpool General Petition Committee, which advocated constitutional reform in New South Wales. His career was supported by influential patrons, particularly Sir Walter Scott, John Seton Karr and the Earl of Buchan. Their assistance helped him establish professional connections in Scotland and subsequently emigrate to New South Wales.

Kinghorne's acquisition of extensive colonial estates also formed part of the wider dispossession of Aboriginal peoples. His surviving correspondence records interactions with Aboriginal communities, particularly at Jervis Bay, but provides limited evidence of his views on colonisation's consequences for Indigenous people.

=== Family and pastoral legacy ===
In Australia, Kinghorne established the foundations of extensive family pastoral holdings. His sons developed sheep and cattle properties across New South Wales, while his daughter Elizabeth and her husband James Chisholm junior consolidated these holdings. The Chisholm family subsequently acquired extensive pastoral holdings in New South Wales, including properties formerly operated by the Kinghorne family. Following his return to Scotland in 1840, Kinghorne experienced financial difficulties associated with the economic depression of the early 1840s and declining income from his Australian properties. His surviving architectural works, maps, correspondence and colonial administrative records document a career spanning the Scottish Borders and early colonial Australia.
