= Robert Cartwright (clergyman) =

Church of England clergyman in the Colony of New South Wales (1771–1856)

The Reverend Robert Cartwright
- Rector of St. James', Sydney
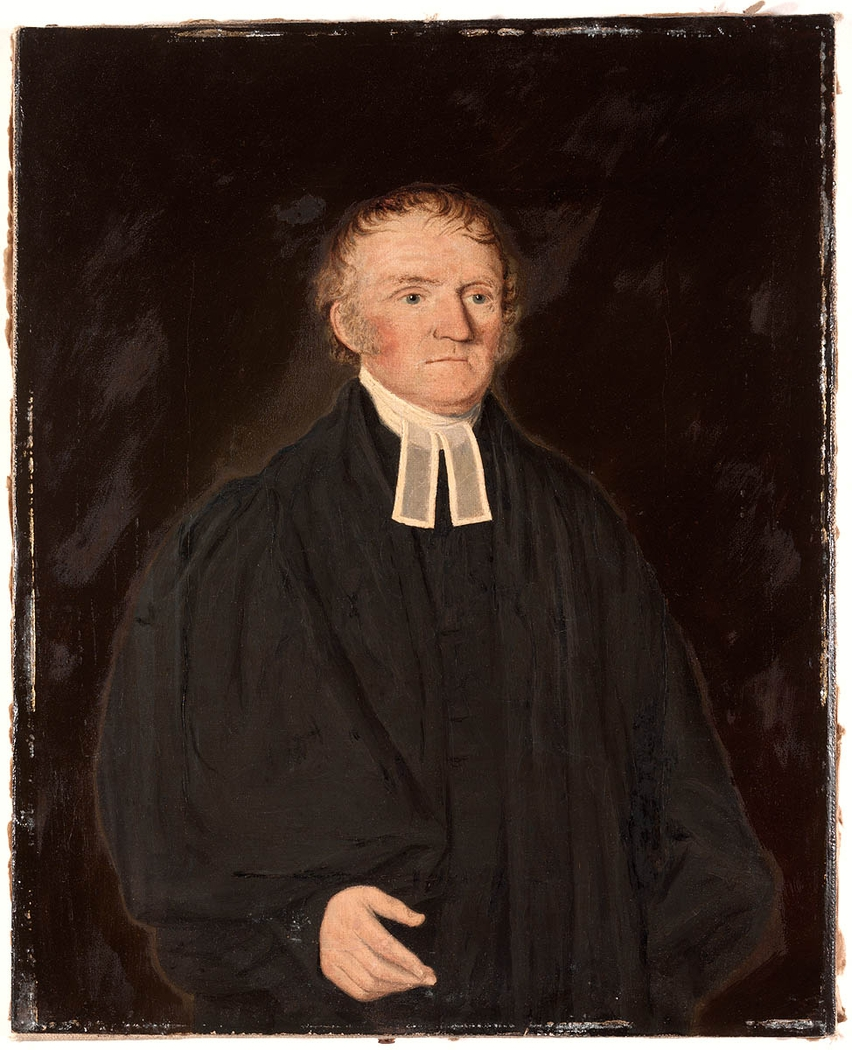
- Diocese: Diocese of Australia; Diocese of Sydney

Personal details
- Born: December 1771 Wellington, Shropshire
- Died: 14 December 1856 (aged 85) Goulburn, New South Wales
- Denomination: Anglican
- Spouse: Mary Boardman (m. 1796; died 1835)

Robert Cartwright (1771–1856) was a Church of England clergyman who played an active part in the early religious life of the Colony of New South Wales. Upon his arrival in Sydney, Cartwright was appointed to Windsor, where he remained until December 1819, his next appointment being to Liverpool, 1820–1836, and then to St. James's, Sydney, to succeed Richard Hill, where he remained till 1838, finally moving to Collector (Gunning), where he remained until his death in 1856. His first wife predeceased him in 1835.

== England ==
Robert Cartwright was a native of Shropshire, England, where he was born in December 1771, and after travelling in Eastern Europe entered St. Edmund's Hall, Oxford, and subsequently being ordained, became curate of Bradford, Yorkshire, where he was visited by the Samuel Marsden, who in 1807–1808 was visiting England after an absence of fourteen years from New South Wales.

Cartwright was induced by Marsden to offer for service in the Colony of New South Wales, Marsden having induced the Government to send out more clergymen and schoolmasters. The selection of these was entrusted to his own judgment, with the result that, in a letter dated from Cambridge, 1 August 1809, and written just prior to his return to Sydney, he was confident "that his mission had been answered beyond his expectations".

== New South Wales ==
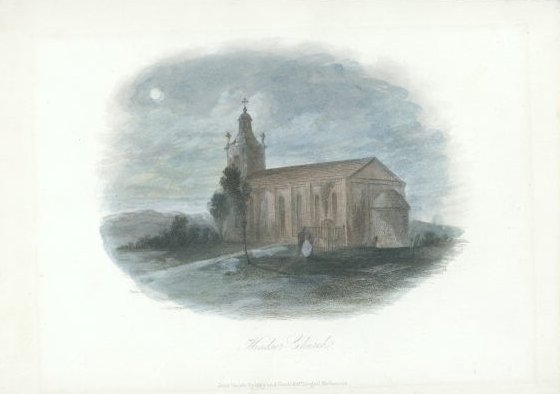
View of St Matthew's Church, Windsor (1860s)

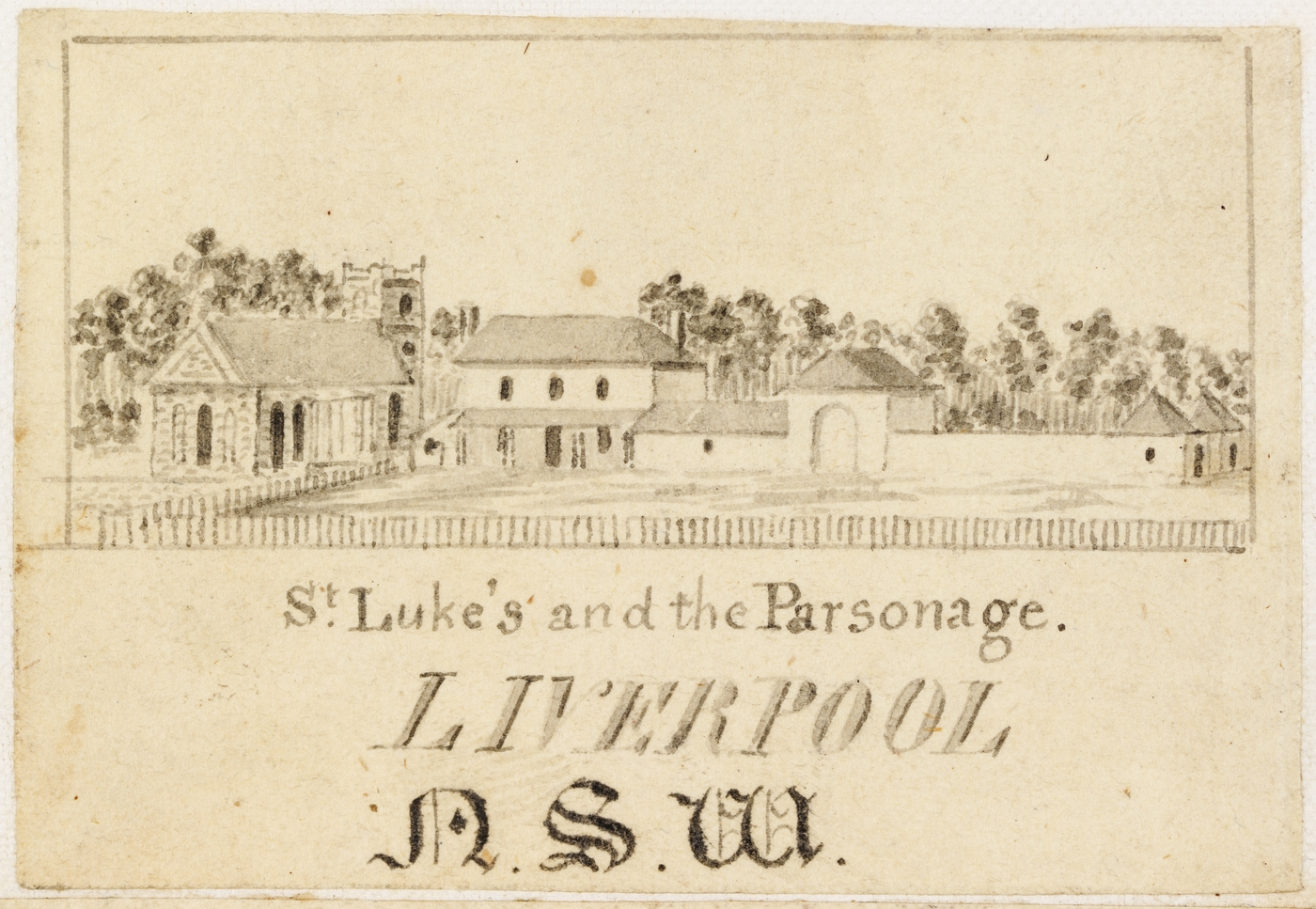
"St Luke's and the Parsonage, Liverpool, N.S.W." From Views of Sydney and Surrounding District, by Edward Mason (c. 1821–1823)

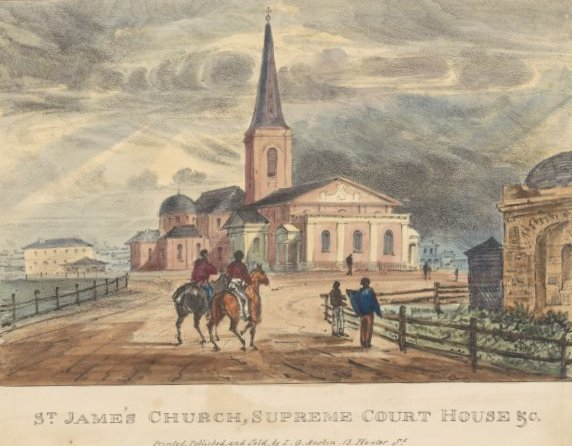
View of St James' Church, Sydney, from a series of lithographic drawings of Sydney and its environs (1836)

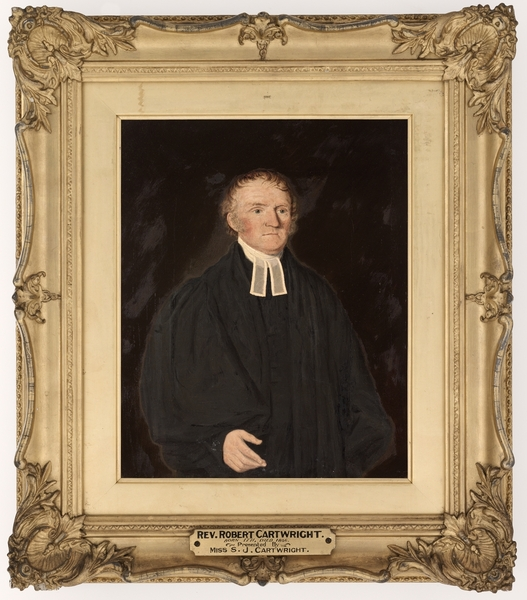
Rev. Robert Cartwright. The above portrait, by an unknown artist, in its frame (Date unknown)

As a result of the visit to England of Samuel Marsden, two clergymen were induced to come out to New South Wales in the ship Ann(e), which arrived on 27 February 1810. These were William Cowper, afterwards Dean of Sydney, and Robert Cartwright. They were therefore among the earliest regular clergy in New South Wales, succeeding Richard Johnson and Samuel Marsden. Henry Fulton and John Youl were also then in the colony, but were not chaplains.

=== Windsor ===
Soon after his arrival in Sydney on 27 February 1810, with his wife and six children and two servants, Cartwright was appointed to the Hawkesbury at a salary of £240 per annum. The new town of Windsor became the centre of Cartwright's chaplaincy, and he initially conducted divine service in a small building at the north end of the town. From the active period of his residence in Windsor, he has been called one of its founders, and the builder of the Church of England, for he was present at the meeting (1811) to build the original church in Bridge Street, and assisted Governor Macquarie to lay the corner stone of the present St. Matthew's Church, upon the second time of laying, on 13 October 1817. The corner stone laid by the Governor two days previously had been removed by thieves, who stole the coins deposited underneath it. He was also at the opening ceremony, on 18 December 1822. He was, therefore, the first settled incumbent of that church, and it was he who conducted the funeral of Andrew Thompson, in October 1810, and also preached his In Memoriam sermon.

On 8 June 1811, Cartwright was appointed a magistrate for Wilberforce, which position he held till 1817. The same year he was also appointed, along with James Mileham and William Cox, to sit in Windsor as one of the weekly bench of magistrates to hear cases from the whole district.

He was also one of the founders of the Hawkesbury Benevolent Society, in 1818, taking an active interest in it during his residence in Windsor. He is listed as a life member in every report, from 1841 till the year of his death in December 1856, long after he left the district, he being the last survivor of the originators of the Society.

=== Liverpool and elsewhere ===
Cartwright remained in Windsor until December 1819, being appointed in that year, largely through the influence of the Governor, resident chaplain at Liverpool. He was the first incumbent of St. Luke's Church, Liverpool, where he remained until 1836. Besides his pastoral work he was appointed superintendent of the Orphan School, as well as an establishment for the instruction of the children of the Aborigines. In 1836, there being a vacancy in St. James's, Sydney, Cartwright was removed to that historic church, succeeding Richard Hill as rector, and remained there until 1838.

After a brief ministry at St. James', Cartwright worked in various parts as an itinerant minister. For some years he travelled over 25,000 miles, ministering to the spiritual needs of the settlers in the southern parts of the colony, until old age compelled him to restrict his labours to the district around Collector (Gunning).

== Death ==
Robert Cartwright died in Goulburn in 1856, and was buried in St. Luke's cemetery, Liverpool.

The following notice of his death is worth recording:—

Died from the effects of bronchitis, in his 86th year, on Sunday, the 14th inst., at his residence, Goulburn, the Rev. Robert Cartwright, for 46 years a chaplain of the colony. His friends and the clergy of the Church of England are informed that his remains will be interred in the family vault at Liverpool on Saturday, the 20th instant.

The following is the inscription on his tombstone:—

Rev. Robert Cartwright, many years minister of St. Luke's Church. Born 1771. Died 1856.
Also his wife, Mary, born 1771. Died 1837.
Daughter, Penelope died 1822.
Children of Richard and Ann Sadler.
Richard Sadler, Commander R.N. Born 6th May, 1794. Died 6th March 1889.
'And by it he being dead, yet speaketh.'—Heb. XI. 4.

== Private life ==
Cartwright married Mary Boardman in England in 1796. They had eleven children. She predeceased her husband in 1835, and was buried in Liverpool. His second wife, Isabella Waddell of Collector, survived him. In a census taken in Windsor in 1818 he is listed as having eight children—Ann, Elizabeth, Richard, Thomas, John, Mary, Robert and Jane. The younger ones were born in New South Wales. Another child, William, died aged three months, on 5 January 1812, and in a letter dated 1830 he mentions, in addition to the above, a son, Charles. James Samuel Hassall says that about the year 1850 two of Cartwright's sons were settled on a property "Windellema", in the Bungonia parish near Goulburn.

== Anecdotes ==
In an old letter in the Mitchell Library, dated Liverpool, 20 September 1830, Cartwright is of the opinion that a better site might have been procured for St. Matthew's Church, and for which a legal title might have been obtained. Writing of the glebe land, evidently that at Clarendon, he says it was part of a common to which he had an equal right with his neighbours, as he had land adjoining. He complains that this land was neither fenced nor cleared, and that he should not be expected to do this work out of his private income, as it was for the benefit of his successors as much as for himself. As there was no parsonage house or glebe available for him, he mentions that he had to purchase a farm of 100 acres at Richmond in 1813, which was his principal establishment till he left Windsor in 1820. The above letter was addressed to Bishop Broughton in support of a claim for arrears of money due to the writer.

He received two grants of 500 and 600 acres respectively in the Evan district, near Castlereagh, on 25 August 1812. Cartwright's letters were preserved enough for James S. Hassall, a descendant of Samuel Marsden, to record them in his book In Old Australia as example common documents of the time.

Cartwright's letter to Thomas Hassall:

Windsor, February 15th, 1815. Dear sir,
—I am much obliged to you for the trouble you have taken about the wool, &c., &c. I must request you will likewise see the present load weighed and entered to my account with Mr. Birnie. I have now, according to promise, sent the whole of this year's produce. I think you will find the present quality to be superior to the first. I thought to have been at Sydney before now, but have been prevented. I shall be much obliged to you if you will procure for me a bag of sugar, a barr or two of iron, a small quantity of rope, 4 pieces of Nankeen, 4 pieces of good com. calico, 36 panes of window glass 8 x 10. If Mr. Birnie should not have those things perhaps you may get them at Marr's. Be good enough to send me an account of them.

Hassal's reply:

Sydney, 17th February, 1815. Dear Sir,
—The wool weighed 193lbs. It was a good sample of lamb's wool. As Mr. B. has not seen it the price cannot be stated. He does not allow so much for lamb's as for fleece wool. I have got some of the things per list enclosed, which I expect to settle for in the course of the day. There is no Iron to be purchased in Sydney, neither window glass of the size you want. There are some 7 x 9 at 3s sterling a pane. As I am coming up on Saturday next I will, if possible, bring up an account of what Mr. B. allows for the wool. With Best respects to Mrs. C, &c., &c.,
T. HASSALL.

Sent from Marr's:—
Bag sugar, 222lbs., at 10d	9	5	0
4 pieces calico	5	0	0
4 pieces Nankeen	2	4	0
From Williams'—Rope	0	10	0
	£16	19	0

Hassall wrote "It is to be hoped that the price Mr. Cartwright got for his 'Wool' was in due proportion to the price he had to pay for his 'Sugar'", apparently implying he found the price paid for sugar to be exorbitant.

== See also ==
- Christianity in Australia
- Anglican Church of Australia
- List of Anglican churches in the Diocese of Sydney
