= Gledswood Hills =

- Suburb
- Interactive map of Gledswood Hills
- Country: Australia
- State: New South Wales
- Region: Macarthur
- City: Sydney
- LGA: Camden Council

Government
  - State electorate: Camden
  - Federal division: Macarthur

Population
  - Total: 6,112 (2021 census)
- Postcode: 2557

Gledswood Hills is a suburb of the Macarthur Region of Sydney in the state of New South Wales, Australia in Camden Council. The suburb name was assigned on 9 December 2011. The suburb was named after the 1830 Gledswood Homestead.

Gledswood Hills sits on the land of the Dharawal people.

== Heritage listings ==
Gledswood Hills has a number of heritage-listed sites, including:

- 900 Camden Valley Way: Gledswood

Channon street
