= William Kinghorne =

- Portrait of Captain W. Kinghorne 1834, by Thomas Lempriere (1796-1852), National Portrait Gallery, Canberra.
- Born: 12 August 1796; Bowden, Roxburghshire, Scotland
- Died: 31 August 1878, aged 82; Maxton, Near Goulburn, New South Wales
- Burial place: St James' Anglican Church, Kippilaw
- Occupations: Mariner and pastoralist
- Parent: Alexander Kinghorne Sr (1770-1846) (father) Betty Brockie (1769-1819) (mother)

William Kinghorne (1796-1878) was a Scottish-born mariner, colonial shipmaster and Australian pastoralist. After serving in the Royal Navy during the Napoleonic Wars, he emigrated to Australia in 1822 and became a captain in the Colonial Marine of Van Diemen's Land (Tasmania). He commanded vessels carrying convicts and supplies to remote penal settlements, explored the Gordon River, and participated in the transportation of Aboriginal Tasmanians to Flinders Island. The Kinghorne River in western Tasmania was named after him. Leaving maritime service, he established a whaling station at Jervis Bay before becoming a substantial landholder in New South Wales. He died near Goulburn in 1878.

== Early Life (1796-1812) ==
William Kinghorne was born on 12 August 1796 at Bowden, Roxburghshire, Scotland, the second son of Alexander Kinghorne (1770-1846) and Betty Brockie (1769-1819). His father was a schoolmaster, surveyor and later civil engineer, whose mentors included Sir Walter Scott and Thomas Telford. In 1800, the family moved to Kippilaw Mains, near Bowden, where Alexander was employed as estate manager (factor) to John Seton Karr of Kippilaw.

William received his early education principally from his parents, supplemented by attendance at the Bowden parish school. His father provided instruction in mathematics and surveying, skills that would later prove useful in maritime navigation. William grew up in a large Presbyterian family, experiencing the deaths of two younger brothers and his mother's prolonged illness. While his elder brother James followed their father into surveying and estate management, William was destined for military service. His father's social and professional connections helped secure his entry into the Royal Navy in 1812, during the Napoleonic Wars.

== Royal Navy and merchant marine service (1812-1818) ==
In August 1812, aged fifteen, he entered the Royal Navy through the patronage of Thomas Williamson Ramsay, a Scottish merchant and landowner associated with his father. He joined HMS Nightingale, a brig-sloop commanded by Christopher Nixon, as a First Class Volunteer. The vessel belonged to the Leith Squadron of the North Sea Fleet, which operated against Danish and Norwegian shipping during the Napoleonic Wars. Kinghorne's early naval service involved patrols, convoy protection and the interception of enemy vessels in the North and Baltic Seas. Initially dissatisfied with naval life, he requested permission to return home but subsequently adapted to his duties under Nixon's command. In May, 1812, Nightingale, operating with HMS Rifleman, captured the Danish vessels Palmtract and Namur. Further operations included the capture of the American merchantman Calumet in January 1813, and the Danish sloop Enigheiden in March. Kinghorne also served aboard Nightingale when she temporarily became the flagship of Vice Admiral Albany Otway at Leith in 1813.

On 24 February 1814, Kinghorne was rated midshipman, having completed less than two years of service. During 1814-1815, Nightingale escorted military transports and merchant convoys between Britain and continental Europe. Following Napoleon's defeat at Waterloo in June 1815, the vessel proceeded to Antwerp, where its officers and crew assisted in the care and evacuation of wounded soldiers. Nightingale was paid off at Sheerness on 23 August 1815, ending Kinghorne's Royal Navy service. He subsequently entered the British merchant marine, although details of his activities immediately after the Napoleonic Wars remain uncertain. By May 1818, he had obtained command of a merchant vessel, having progressed from his earlier naval training to the position of shipmaster.

== The Bodø incident (1818-1819) ==
In May 1818, Kinghorne was captain of the Norwegian trading schooner Forsøget, employed by the London mercantile firm Everth and Son. The vessel operated between Antwerp, Norway and the White Sea, carrying merchandise intended for trade with Scandinavian and Russian merchants. Kinghorne became involved in the Bodø affair (Bodøsaken), a commercial and diplomatic dispute between Britain and the Swedish-Norwegian union. The dispute arose when the British merchants, working with Carl Johan Gerss, a Swedish-Finnish trader established at Bodø in northern Norway, attempted to import goods in contravention of Norwegian customs regulations. Three vessels were involved, including Kinghorne's Forsøget. Following the wreck of one vessel, the St John, near the Lofoten Islands in June 1818, Kinghorne assisted in recovering its cargo and transporting it to Bodø.

In September 1818, Norwegian customs officials seized the Forsøget and its cargo on suspicion of smuggling. During a confrontation at Gerss' premises on 24 September, Kinghorne came ashore with a boat crew to assist John Everth Jr, who was resisting eviction by local authorities. British and Norwegian accounts differ concerning the circumstances of the confrontation. Kinghorne, Everth and several associates were subsequently arrested and imprisoned at Hernes, near Bodø. After two months' imprisonment, Kinghorne and his companions were released on bail in November 1818, although their vessels remained detained. On 28 February 1819, Everth and 20 seamen forcibly recovered part of their confiscated merchandise, overpowered the guards and escaped aboard Forsøget and Commerce d'Anvers. Kinghorne subsequently sailed Forsøget towards the Faroe Islands, where the vessel was reported in July 1819.

In August 1819, the Swedish-Norwegian authorities issued a summons accusing Kinghorne, Everth and Gerss of offences including smuggling, assault, unlawful seizure of vessels and removal of confiscated property. The affair developed into a diplomatic dispute between the British Foreign Office and the Swedish-Norwegian government, with negotiations continuing into 1822 and commercial litigation lasting until 1825. The incident damaged the commercial interests of Everth and Son, which became bankrupt in 1822, and effectively ended Kinghorne's involvement in European maritime trade.

== Emigration to Australia (1821-1822) ==
Figure 1. Distant View of Hobart Town, Van Diemen's Land, 1824, by Joseph Lycett.

Following the death of his mother in August 1819, Kinghorne's father, Alexander, began planning his family's emigration to New South Wales. Encouraged by Sir Walter Scott, he sought employment opportunities for his sons through influential acquaintances, including the Earl of Buchan and Sir Henry Hay Mackdougall, father-in-law of Governor Sir Thomas Brisbane. His two eldest sons, James and William, were to emigrate first, with the remainder of the family following later. The brothers departed Leith aboard the Castle Forbes on 27 August 1821, arriving at Hobart Town, Van Diemen's Land, on 2 March 1822 (Figure 1). Their letters of introduction secured an audience with Lieutenant-Governor William Sorell, who offered William an appointment as a ship's master in the Colonial Marine service, which he accepted. James continued to Sydney aboard the Castle Forbes in April, where Governor Brisbane appointed him Assistant Superintendent of the Government Prison Farm at Emu Plains.

== Macquarie Harbour (1822-1829) ==
Kinghorne's principal responsibility during his years in the Colonial Marine was transporting convicts, military personnel, provisions and equipment between Hobart Town and the penal settlement at Macquarie Harbour, on the remote west coast of Van Diemen's Land. He commanded the government schooner Waterloo from 1822 until 1826, followed by the brig Cyprus until 1829. The 81-ton Waterloo, constructed from Huon pine, was launched on 9 August 1822. Kinghorne undertook his first voyage to Macquarie Harbour in October, returning to Hobart in November with a cargo of Huon pine.

Over the following years, he made regular voyages carrying prisoners, soldiers, officials and supplies to the settlement, returning with timber, coal and products manufactured by convict labour. The passage of approximately 250 nautical miles involved rounding Tasmania's southern capes and navigating the exposed western coastline against prevailing westerly winds. Entry to Macquarie Harbour was particularly hazardous, requiring passage through the narrow entrance known as Hell's Gates, where strong tidal currents, shifting sandbars and heavy seas frequently delayed shipping. In July 1824, the Waterloo was detained for 22 days by gales. During an attempted departure on 29 July, she struck the bar and damaged her rudder fittings, requiring repairs before proceeding.

Kinghorne's duties also involved transporting officials and prisoners between the penal settlement and Hobart. In April 1824, the Waterloo returned the remains of Lieutenant John Cuthbertson, Macquarie Harbour's first commandant, for a military funeral in Hobart. Later that year, Kinghorne conveyed prisoners accused of murders committed during escape attempts back to Hobart for trial. In March–April 1825, he transported Lieutenant James Butler and his military detachment to Macquarie Harbour, returning with the outgoing commandant, Lieutenant Samuel Wright.

In September 1826, Kinghorne assumed command of the 100-ton brig Cyprus. His first voyage was severely delayed by adverse weather, forcing him to sail north through Bass Strait rather than around Tasmania's southern coast. After 53 days he reached Macquarie Harbour, where lightning struck and shattered the vessel's topmast. He nevertheless returned safely to Hobart in November with a cargo of Huon pine. The Cyprus subsequently underwent extensive repairs at Macquarie Harbour between September 1827 and May 1828. Kinghorne resumed his voyages after the refit, continuing to transport convicts, provisions and timber. His final recorded voyage as master of the Cyprus was in April 1829.

Throughout this period, Kinghorne was responsible for the navigation, seaworthiness and cargo arrangements of his vessels, while military guards retained responsibility for the custody of prisoners. His service formed part of the maritime transport system upon which the isolated penal settlement depended.

== Aboriginal transportation (1829-1830) ==
William Kinghorne's involvement in the transportation of Aboriginal Tasmanians arose from his service in the Colonial Marine and his association with George Augustus Robinson, who was appointed in 1829 as ‘storekeeper’ of a government settlement for Aboriginal people on Bruny Island. The settlement formed part of Lieutenant Governor George Arthur's policy of removing Aboriginal Tasmanians from districts occupied by European settlers, following years of violent conflict, dispossession and population decline.

Kinghorne had become interested in land on northern Bruny Island during his voyages through the D'Entrecasteaux Channel. In February 1824, he applied for a grant of 500 acres, subsequently occupying land adjoining Kinghorne Bay (now Apollo Bay). Robinson established his Aboriginal settlement at Missionary Bay in 1829, approximately two and a half miles southeast of Kinghorne Bay. The two properties were separated by a narrow strip of land. The surviving Nuenonne people of Bruny Island continued to travel through the surrounding country, although no direct encounters between Kinghorne and the Aboriginal inhabitants are documented.

Kinghorne's first recorded association with Robinson occurred in May 1829, shortly after he relinquished command of the government brig Cyprus and assumed command of the Prince Leopold. On 13 May, he transported Robinson from Hobart to Bruny Island, carrying building materials and provisions for the new settlement, including 3,000 bricks, window sashes, medicine, wheelbarrows and ironmongery. Robinson subsequently used the establishment as a base for his efforts to persuade Aboriginal people to leave their traditional lands and enter government settlements. The Prince Leopold also transported Aboriginal passengers between colonial settlements. In October 1829, the vessel delivered two Aboriginal women and a young boy to Robinson on Bruny Island, although the identity of its master on that voyage has not been established.

Kinghorne's former command, the Cyprus, was implicated in another incident involving Aboriginal Tasmanians. In September 1829, Robinson recorded a statement by Mangana, the father of Truganini, alleging that soldiers had abducted his wife aboard the Cyprus while he was at Recherche Bay, and that his sixteen-year-old son had died. Robinson and his clerk, Charles Sterling, associated the incident with the vessel's voyage preceding its seizure by convicts in August 1829. Kinghorne had relinquished command several months earlier and was not aboard the Cyprus during these events.

In October 1829, Robinson travelled aboard the Prince Leopold to investigate Maria Island as an alternative location for the Aboriginal settlement. During the voyage, he recorded allegations that the vessel's master had expressed hostility towards Aboriginal people and described an incident in which a soldier shot an Aboriginal man, whose decapitated body was subsequently displayed aboard a ship. The master's identity was not given in the original account. However, in a journal entry written in March 1833, Robinson recalled that Kinghorne had commanded the Prince Leopold during the October 1829 voyage. The manuscript account of the alleged atrocity was inserted into Robinson's journal after the original entry had been written, and its precise circumstances and attribution remain uncertain. There is no independent evidence establishing Kinghorne's participation in the incident.

Robinson's Bruny Island settlement was unsuccessful, with illness and deaths among its Aboriginal inhabitants leading to its abandonment. Kinghorne's subsequent maritime service brought him into further contact with Robinson and the government's Aboriginal removal programme, which eventually centred on the Wybalenna settlement on Flinders Island.

== William Kinghorne and William Moriarty in the Colonial Marine (1831-1834) ==
In May 1831, Kinghorne assumed command of the 150-ton government brig Isabella, built at Macquarie Harbour from Huon pine. The largest vessel he commanded during his colonial service, the Isabella was employed transporting convicts, military detachments, passengers and supplies between Hobart Town, Port Arthur, Maria Island and Launceston. Between April 1831 and October 1832, Kinghorne undertook approximately fourteen voyages, returning with timber and other products of convict labour.

In October 1832, Commander William Moriarty (1792–1850), a former Royal Navy officer and son of Vice Admiral Sylverius Moriarty, became Port Officer at Hobart Town. Moriarty had emigrated to Van Diemen's Land in 1829, following the wreck of the emigrant ship Letitia, on which he and his family were travelling, at the Cape Verde Islands. His appointment marked a period of administrative reform within the Colonial Marine. He introduced more systematic scheduling of government vessels, improved communication between the Port Office, Commissariat and convict administration, and established detailed procedures for recording cargoes and shipping movements. He also promoted improvements in coastal navigation, lighthouse construction and maritime safety. Following several seizures of government vessels by convicts, he secured changes to the composition of their crews, including the employment of additional free seamen and the appointment of second mates.

Kinghorne continued commanding the Isabella under Moriarty's supervision. In October 1832, he was instructed to transport prisoners and military personnel to Port Arthur before proceeding to Maria Island to assist with the evacuation of its closing penal settlement. His subsequent duties included surveying government vessels, transporting officials to lighthouse sites and shipwrecks, and carrying official dispatches. In July 1833, Moriarty selected him to pursue the schooner Badger, which had been seized by convicts. Their professional relationship reflected their shared naval backgrounds. Moriarty entrusted Kinghorne with assignments requiring maritime experience and judgement, although he generally favoured Captain John Richard Bateman, master of the Tamar, for senior administrative responsibilities. Bateman served as Acting Port Officer during Moriarty's absence in 1834, while Kinghorne remained in command of the Isabella.

== Port Arthur and transition to New South Wales (1834-1836) ==
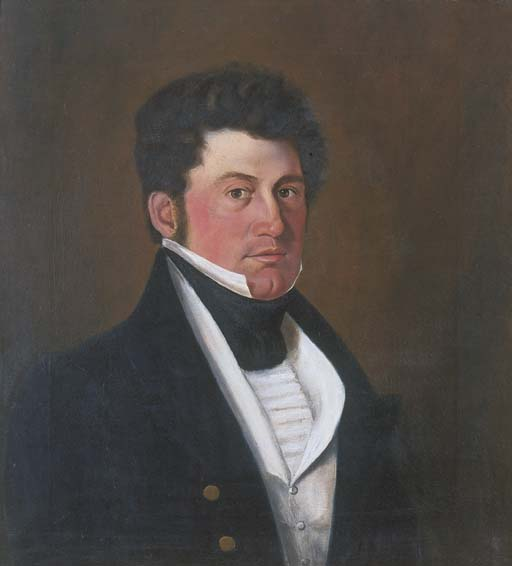
Figure 2. Thomas James Lempriere - Self Portrait, 1835

Between May 1831 and September 1836, Kinghorne made 46 return voyages to Port Arthur aboard the government brig Isabella, transporting convicts, military personnel, passengers and supplies. During these visits he became acquainted with the settlement's first commandant, Charles O'Hara Booth, and maintained a friendship with Thomas James Lempriere (Figure 2), a former commissariat officer at Macquarie Harbour who had transferred to Port Arthur in August 1833.

Lempriere was an amateur artist whose sketches and watercolours provide an important visual record of Tasmania's early penal settlements. In March 1834, during one of Kinghorne's visits to Port Arthur, Lempriere began painting his portrait. Kinghorne sat for the artist on several occasions between 26 and 29 March, and the painting was completed in June. Lempriere presented it to Kinghorne on 7 June 1834, inscribing it as a token of friendship. Kinghorne subsequently displayed the portrait in his cabin aboard the Isabella. The painting depicts Kinghorne aged 37, with dark hair beginning to grey and blue eyes. It remained in the possession of his family for more than 170 years, principally at Kippilaw, near Goulburn, New South Wales, before its acquisition by the National Portrait Gallery of Australia in 2007.

Kinghorne's final years in the Colonial Marine coincided with several maritime disasters in southern Van Diemen’s Land. In April 1835, the convict transport George the Third struck a submerged rock near the Actaeon Reefs, with the loss of 134 lives. The Isabella was among the vessels dispatched to assist survivors. In August 1835, the merchant ship Wallace was wrecked in the same vicinity. Among its passengers was Kinghorne's sister Helen, returning from Scotland. She survived the wreck, and Kinghorne subsequently provided her with necessities and arranged passage to Sydney. Family correspondence described Port Officer William Moriarty as an intimate friend of Kinghorne and recorded his assistance to Helen following the disaster.

On 31 August 1836, Moriarty submitted his resignation as Port Officer. Three days later, he forwarded Kinghorne's application for retirement and a gratuity recognising fourteen and a half years of colonial service. Moriarty strongly supported the request, praising Kinghorne's carefulness, fidelity, intelligence and zeal, particularly during his demanding voyages to Macquarie Harbour.

Kinghorne's final voyage aboard the Isabella departed Hobart for Port Arthur on 29 August 1836, returning on 12 September. He formally retired from the Colonial Marine on 1 October 1836, aged 40. On 19 November 1836, he departed Hobart aboard the barque Gulnare, bound for Sydney. His retirement marked the end of fourteen years as a colonial government shipmaster and the beginning of a new career associated with his family's pastoral interests in New South Wales, although he would maintain connections with maritime activities.

== Whaling at Jervis Bay and farming Nowra (1837-1844) ==
Following retirement from the Colonial Marine of Van Diemen's Land, Kinghorne arrived in Sydney on 30 November 1836 and became involved in his family's expanding pastoral interests in New South Wales. His father, Alexander Kinghorne, had acquired extensive properties near Bathurst and Goulburn and planned to establish a coastal outlet for transporting livestock and agricultural produce to Sydney by sea. William consequently settled in the Jervis Bay and Shoalhaven districts, where he developed agricultural and maritime enterprises.

The family's principal coastal property was Mount Jervis, comprising approximately 2,560 acres on the northern shore of Jervis Bay. Originally promised to Robert Lambert in 1838, it was occupied by the Kinghornes from January 1839 and formally transferred to Alexander in 1841. In a letter dated 5 July 1839, Alexander reported that William and his brother James had been improving the estate since February, clearing land, constructing enclosures and establishing agricultural plantings. Although Alexander envisaged an elaborate residence, vineyards and an observatory, there is little evidence that these ambitious plans were realised.

In September 1839, Alexander Kinghorne arranged the purchase of a further 666 acres at Saltwater Creek, near its junction with the Shoalhaven River, upstream from present-day Nowra. The property was intended both as a resting place for livestock travelling towards Jervis Bay and an agricultural establishment for William. The purchase was completed for £242 10s, and the grant formalised in February 1840.

Following his father's return to Scotland in March 1840, William Kinghorne managed his South Coast interests independently. The 1841 census recorded him as proprietor of four wooden dwellings distributed between Saltwater Creek, Wogamai, near Nowra, and Cabbage Tree Point on Mount Jervis. His workforce included free settlers, domestic servants and assigned convicts. By 1842, he had constructed two large barns at Saltwater Creek, cultivated 20 acres of wheat and 30 acres of maize, and prepared another 50 acres for cultivation.

William Kinghorne also established a shore-based whaling station at Jervis Bay, operating by 1841 and possibly from 1838 or 1839. Drawing on his maritime experience in Van Diemen’s Land, he employed crews using open whaleboats and hand-thrown harpoons to hunt whales entering the bay during their seasonal migration. Captured whales were brought ashore, where their blubber was rendered into oil for sale. Contemporary newspaper accounts located his establishment on the western side of Jervis Bay, near present-day Callala Bay, although its precise site remains uncertain. His employees and convicts also engaged in commercial fishing outside the whaling season. An account published in 1841 described them catching snapper and other fish, which were salted, dried and shipped to Sydney. Andrew Cameron, employed from 1839 as overseer at Mount Jervis, supervised workers associated with the property's agricultural and maritime activities.

The Kinghornes maintained contact with local Aboriginal people, including a man identified by Alexander as Wagamy, who had experience whaling in New Zealand and Van Diemen's Land. Alexander's correspondence described Aboriginal assistance with fishing, hunting and coastal transport. Whether Wagamy participated directly in William's whaling enterprise is unknown. His whaling venture was relatively short-lived, ceasing operations around 1844, reportedly because of competition from American whaling vessels, declining whale numbers and the expense of transporting oil to Sydney. His station nevertheless represented an early shore-based whaling enterprise at Jervis Bay, while his agricultural activities established a continuing association with the Shoalhaven district.

== Expanding pastoral interests (1836-1864) ==
William Kinghorne's pastoral interests formed part of the extensive agricultural and grazing enterprises established in New South Wales by his father, Alexander Kinghorne, and his brothers James, John Ker and Alexander Jr. By 1839, the family owned approximately 1,500 cattle and 5,500 sheep, distributed among properties at Goulburn, Bathurst, Jervis Bay and Boorowa. Alexander reported an annual wool clip of 14,000 pounds, valued at £1,166, and a workforce of 49, comprising both free and assigned convict labourers. Following his father's return to Scotland in 1840, William continued managing the family's South Coast properties, while James and John Ker directed the principal pastoral operations inland.

The family's main agricultural establishments were Cardross and Maxton, approximately seven miles west of Goulburn, on the Wollondilly River. Cardross originated in a 2,000-acre Crown grant to Alexander Kinghorne in 1825, subsequently enlarged by further acquisitions. Maxton comprised land granted to James in 1833 and additional land purchased in 1837. In 1836, the properties carried approximately 6,000 sheep and 800 cattle, producing wool, wheat, flour and other agricultural commodities. Their development included a wind-powered flour mill and the employment of numerous convict shepherds and agricultural workers.

During the 1830s and 1840s, the Kinghornes expanded into pastoral country beyond the established limits of settlement. Their holdings eventually exceeded 200,000 acres, extending from the Monaro district through the central tablelands to the Lachlan, Wellington and Bligh districts. Principal runs included Cucumgilliga on the Boorowa River, Grahway in the Wellington district and Wombobbie on Marthaguy Creek. The selection of properties across different climatic regions enabled livestock to be moved between grazing areas according to seasonal conditions. Aboriginal stockmen and guides were employed on some stations, which occupied lands traditionally used and managed by Aboriginal communities.

The Kinghornes specialised in beef cattle and merino sheep. They were early adopters of Shorthorn cattle, obtaining breeding bulls from William Lee's stud at Bathurst. Cattle were raised on the outlying stations, brought to the Goulburn properties for finishing when necessary, and driven overland to Sydney. Contemporary market reports record substantial consignments, sometimes numbering 800 to 1,000 cattle, during the late 1840s and 1850s. William's name does not appear independently in these sales records, suggesting that his livestock dealings remained integrated with those of his brothers.

The family's financial position deteriorated during the economic depression of the early 1840s. Alexander Jr was declared insolvent in 1842, with proven debts of £4,645, although the principal Bathurst estates remained legally in his father's ownership. Further difficulties followed the collapse of the Bank of Australia in 1843. Alexander Kinghorne held ten shares in the bank, for which William and James exercised power of attorney. Subsequent calls on shareholders amounted to £720 by 1851. In 1849, William negotiated an arrangement to meet part of these liabilities, mortgaging his Saltwater Creek property as security. The mortgage was eventually discharged in 1854.

Following Alexander Kinghorne's death in Scotland in February 1846, his surviving estates passed principally to James, William and John Ker. The family nevertheless continued to experience financial difficulties and attempts to sell the Bathurst properties in 1850 were unsuccessful. Their pastoral interests reached their greatest extent during the early 1850s, but the brothers subsequently disposed of their outlying runs, including Cucumgilliga in 1855 and Grahway in 1858. John Ker died in September 1857, prompting James to retire to Balmain and advertise the family's remaining properties for sale. William consequently moved from the Shoalhaven district to Maxton, probably during 1857 or 1858, and assumed increasing responsibility for their management. Following James's death in November 1859, William became his sole executor and inherited responsibility for the surviving family estates.

For the remainder of his life, William Kinghorne managed the properties principally through agricultural tenancies rather than large-scale livestock production. At Goulburn, portions of Maxton and Cardross were leased to local farmers, while the Bathurst properties of Raineville and St Boswells were subdivided into 24 smallholdings. Their administration was entrusted to the Bathurst agent Thomas Martin Sloman, with whom Kinghorne conducted business largely by correspondence. In 1874, he granted Sloman and his partners power of attorney over his Bathurst affairs. The management of these estates remained a principal occupation of Kinghorne's later years.

== Declining health and death (1864-1878) ==
During the 1860s, William Kinghorne gradually withdrew from the physical demands of managing his pastoral properties near Goulburn. In 1829 his sister, Elizabeth, had married James Chisholm Jr of Kippilaw, the neighbouring property to Cardross. In May 1864, William formally leased Maxton and Cardross to his nephew Alexander ("Alick") Kinghorne, who assumed responsibility for their day-to-day management. Another nephew, William Alexander Chisholm, his sister Elizabeth's son, also assisted with the family's affairs. Kinghorne continued to oversee his financial interests, including the sale of Mount Jervis, his former South Coast property, to another nephew, Edward Chisholm, in October 1865.

Kinghorne remained closely associated with the Chisholm family, regularly visiting their neighbouring properties. He frequently attended family gatherings and Sunday dinners at Kippilaw. Although his sister Elizabeth and her family belonged to the Anglican Church, Kinghorne appears to have retained his Presbyterian affiliation. In 1862, his Maxton estate contributed £13 2s 6d to the Lancashire Relief Fund through the Presbyterian Church in Goulburn. He also assumed responsibility for the care of his unmarried sister Isabella, who experienced prolonged periods of mental illness. In 1865, arrangements were made to extend the accommodation at Maxton to provide for her needs. Additional domestic servants and, subsequently, nurses were employed to assist with her care.

Despite advancing age, Kinghorne remained active into his seventies. He attended livestock sales in Goulburn and travelled to Sydney in 1870, where he spent time with William Alexander Chisholm, including regular walks in the Botanic Gardens. He also maintained correspondence with relatives in Scotland. A surviving letter from his cousin Isabella Brockie, dated December 1873, records the family's continuing affection for him and refers to a portrait of Kinghorne in their possession. His health deteriorated markedly in October 1874, when he became seriously ill while staying at Kippilaw. William Alexander Chisholm's diary records that his condition was initially considered critical, requiring almost continuous attendance by Chisholm and Alick Kinghorne. He subsequently recovered, although the nature of the illness remains unknown. A further serious illness occurred in August 1876, followed by another recovery.

In August 1878, Kinghorne became ill for the final time. Unlike previous occasions, when he had been cared for at Kippilaw, his condition prevented his removal from Maxton. He died there on Saturday, 31 August 1878, aged 82. His funeral took place that afternoon at St James' Anglican Church, Kippilaw, where Archdeacon Alfred Tead Puddicombe officiated. Kinghorne was buried in the churchyard alongside members of the extended Chisholm family.

== Legacy of William Kinghorne ==
Kinghorne never married and had no children. His original will left his estate to his sister Isabella, but a codicil executed in 1877 transferred his property in trust to Alick Kinghorne, whom he appointed sole executor, with continuing provision for Isabella's care. Following Alick's accidental death in February 1881, responsibility for the estate passed to William Alexander Chisholm and solicitor John Thomas Gannon. The remaining properties subsequently became part of the wider Chisholm family's holdings.

Kinghorne's historical significance rests principally on two distinct careers. His service as a Royal Navy midshipman during the Napoleonic Wars was followed by fourteen years as a government shipmaster in Van Diemen's Land, where he transported convicts, officials and supplies between colonial settlements. His subsequent activities in whaling, agriculture and pastoral management contributed to the development of the Shoalhaven and Goulburn districts. His surviving correspondence, official records and portrait provide evidence of the career of a colonial mariner who later became a substantial landholder. His involvement in convict transportation and the removal of Aboriginal people also places his life within the broader history of British colonial expansion and its consequences for Indigenous Australians.
