= Richard Hill (priest) =

Anglican priest (1782-1836)

The Reverend Richard Hill
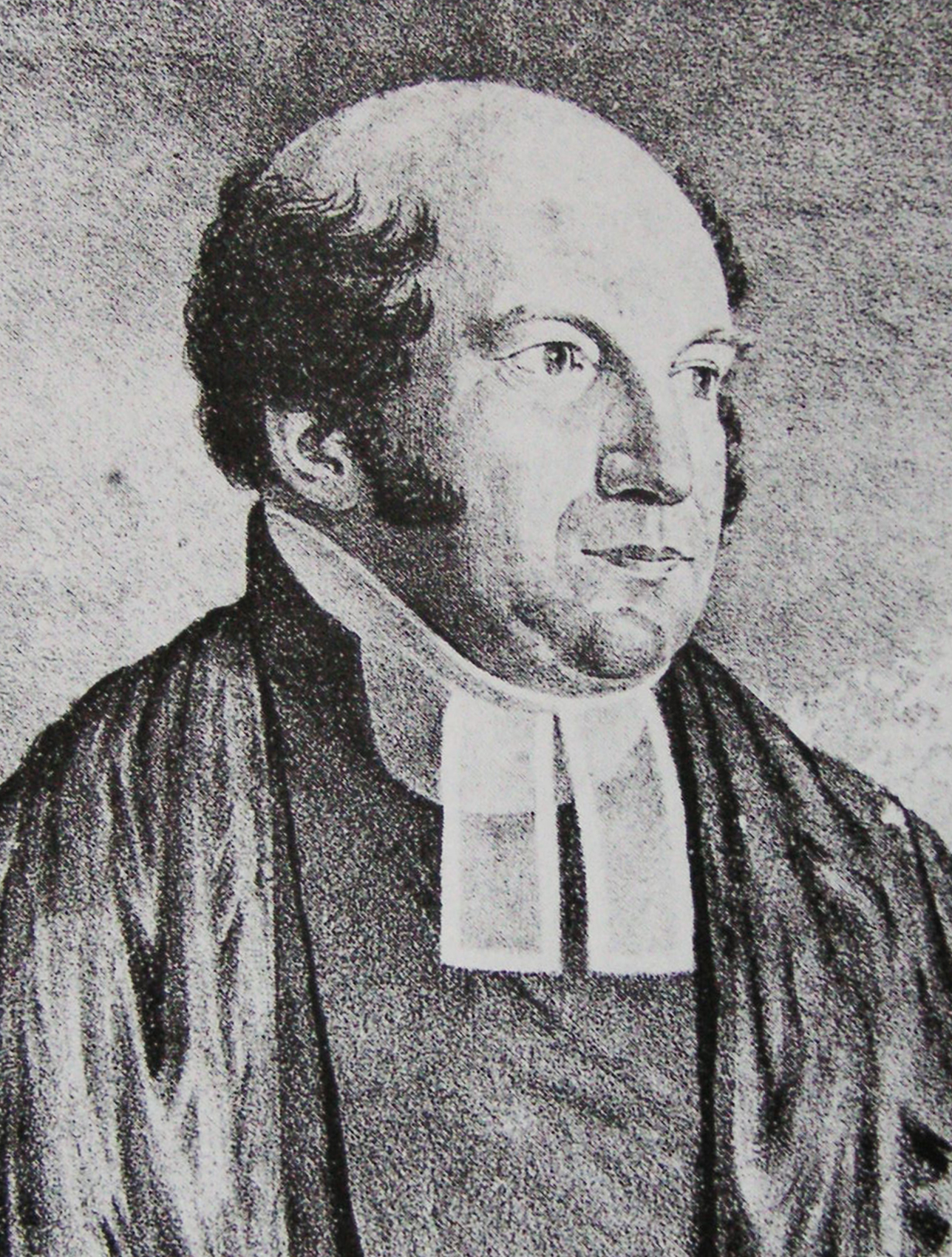
- Richard Hill, a lithograph after a portrait by Richard Read (Reid)
- Born: 11 June 1782; London, England
- Died: 7 November 1836 (aged 54); Sydney, Australia
- Spouse: Phoebe Sapphira
- Parent(s): Joshua Hill; Milborough (née Arnett)
- Religion: Christianity (Anglican)
- Church: Church of England
- Ordained: 5 July 1818
- Congregations served: St Philip's Church, Sydney; St James' Church, Sydney

Richard Hill (1782–1836) was a London-born Church of England priest who was appointed as a chaplain to the colony of New South Wales in 1818. He became the first minister of St James' Church, Sydney, after its consecration in 1824, serving there until he died suddenly in 1836 while on duty in the church. Described as a "charitable man, industrious and a good organiser", Hill was active in philanthropy and humanitarian organisations and after his sudden death was much mourned. He was succeeded at St James by William Grant Broughton.

== London life ==
Hill was the son of school master Joshua Hill and Milborough (née Arnett). He married Phoebe Sapphira Kerrison (1780–1863) on 19 December 1808 at St Marylebone Parish Church. He was ordained priest by the Bishop of London in 1813 and appointed in 1818 as assistant to William Cowper at St Philip's Church, Sydney.

== Voyage to the colony of New South Wales ==
Richard and Phoebe sailed from Portsmouth on 20 November 1818 for New South Wales on the Hibernia, which was the flagship of the British Mediterranean Fleet. At this period, just after Battle of Waterloo, Britain and its Empire were at peace. Large numbers of British and Irish convicts were being shipped to the colony of New South Wales where they were the main source of labour. On board with the Hills were 160 male convicts, of whom three died during the passage. Hibernia arrived in Sydney "after an unusually long voyage" on 18 June 1819.

== Service and works ==
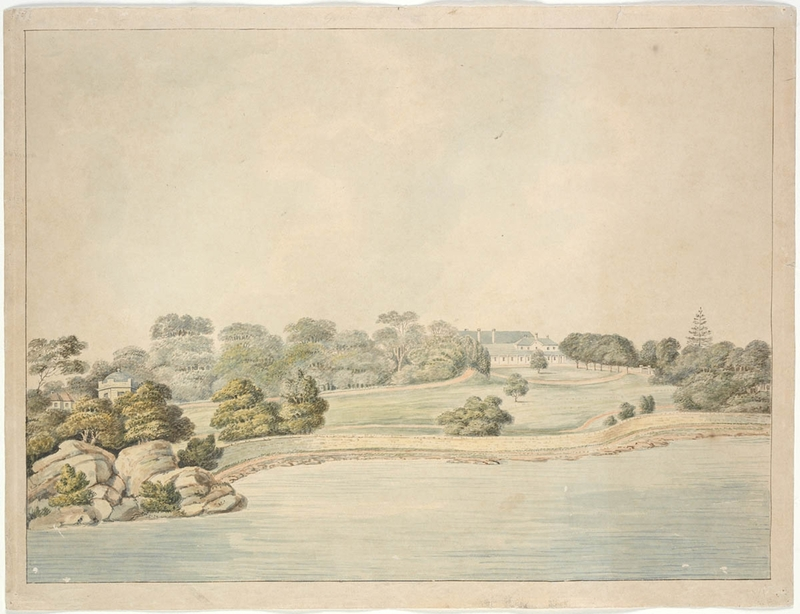
Watercolour drawing attributed to Joseph Lycett. Government House, Sydney from the Cove in 1819, the year of Hill's arrival in the colony.

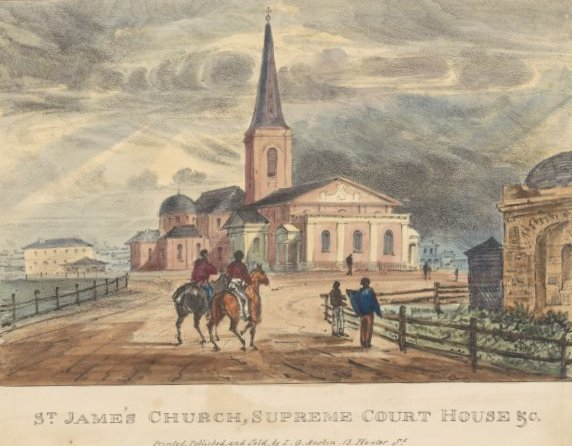
St James' Church, Sydney in the year of Hill's death, 1836. Lithograph created by Robert Russell and printed by J. G. Austin

Hill's work was to minister to the convicts and the poor. Although Richard and his wife were childless, they were "devoted to children and pioneered a tradition of kindergarten teaching." It has been said that the tradition of caring at St James' began with Hill's ministry. Duties at St James included a busy round of baptisms, marriages and funerals. For example, in 1835, he baptized triplets born to Mr and Mrs Whitehead and in 1836 he married the Police Magistrate to the daughter of the Postmaster General at St. James'. In addition to this normal work, Hill conducted services in the region of the Hunter River, and his involvement in humanitarian work included service in a range of organisations, such as being a trustee of the Male and Female Orphan Institutions and the Church and School Lands Corporation and serving sixteen years as Secretary of the Benevolent Society. His interest in people's welfare extended to Aboriginal Australians. He was a founder of the New South Wales Society for Promoting Christian Knowledge among the Aborigines, a director of the Natives Institution and joint secretary of the Australasian auxiliary of the Church Mission Society.

Hill is the author of a published narrative about a woman who died on her birthday as a consequence of her clothes catching fire. The publication is entitled The birth day: a brief narrative of Eliza Reynolds, who died on Sunday, Oct 19, 1834. It was published in Sydney by Stephens and Stokes in 1834.

== Death and estate ==
Richard Hill died on duty in the vestry of St James, reportedly of apoplexy. A tombstone commemorating him is at Camperdown. His sudden death shocked his contemporaries and inspired earnest original poetry in tribute to his memory. At least two multi-stanza original poems were published in the Sydney press, one of which self-consciously referenced a recent poem by Lord Byron by beginning with "There was a sound of revelry by night", borrowed from Childe Harold (Canto the Third, Stanza XXI), and attempting to copy that poem's versification throughout. The poem in tribute to Hill revealed his reputation in the lines at the end of its Stanza III: "... he did most kindly feel For all others' woes, and laboured for their weal."

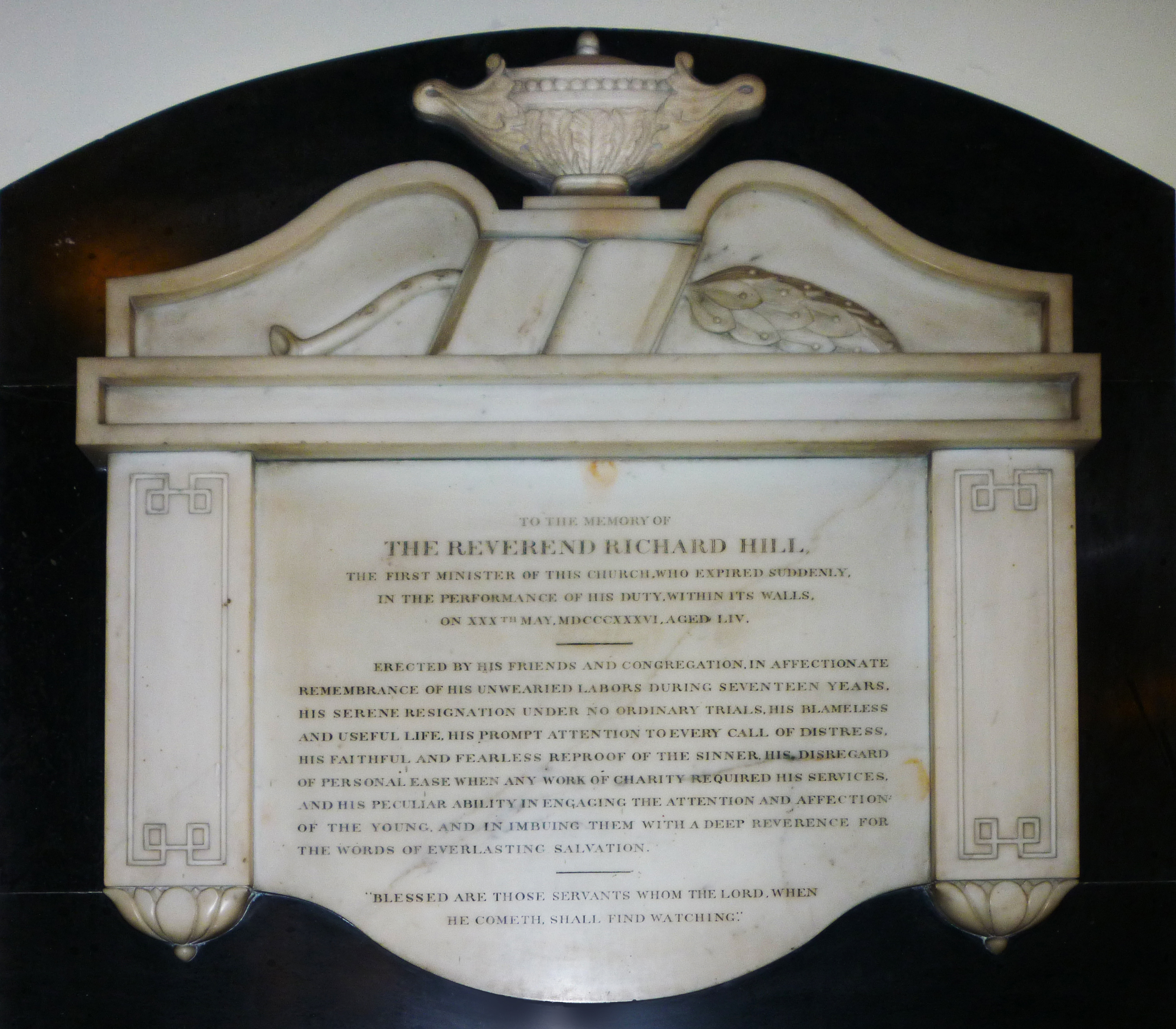
Memorial plaque to Hill in St James' Church, Sydney

Speaking of him in St James' Church on 5 June 1836 after Hill's death, the Bishop of Australia, William Grant Broughton, said:

You know his works: his unwearied labours in the discharge of his public ministry; his serene resignation under no ordinary trials; his blameless and useful life; his prompt attention to every call of distress; his faithful and fearless reproof of the sinner; his disregard of personal ease when any work of charity required his services; his peculiar ability in engaging the attention and affection of the young and in imbuing them with a deep reverence for the words of everlasting salvation.

The printer J. G. Austin, responsible for a lithograph of St James in the year of Hill's death, also printed in the same year, "a very correct likeness of this lamented gentleman, drawn on stone by Mr. Rodius, from a painting by Mr. Reid, the artist". This lithograph was lauded as "one of the best colonial attempts in the Lithographic line of art ... yet witnessed. A more striking resemblance it would not be easy to pourtray".

Property in the colony owned by Hill included suburban lots near Darlinghurst and hundreds of acres in the counties of Hunter and Northumberland, as well as land granted to him.

Hill's theological library, described as "the most extensive ... ever submitted to the community of New South Wales" was sold at auction on 25 and 26 July 1836 in King Street, Sydney.

== See also ==
- Anglican Church of Australia
