= Gledswood =

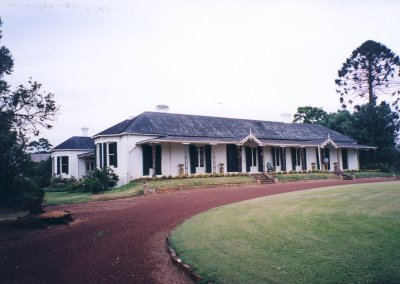

- Location within Sydney Location within Australia
- 34°00′09″S 150°46′56″E
- Location: 900 Camden Valley Way, Gledswood Hills, Camden Council, New South Wales, Australia

History
- Built: 1827–1855

Site notes
- Owner: Caldla Pty Ltd; Sekisui House Australia Pty Ltd; Sekisui House Australia Pty Ltd

New South Wales Heritage Register
- Official name: Gledswood; Buckingham
- Type: State heritage (landscape)
- Designated: 22 December 2006
- Reference no.: 1692
- Type: Homestead Complex
- Category: Farming and Grazing
- Builders: James Chisholm

Gledswood is a heritage-listed former vineyard, colonial farm and homestead and now tourist complex, golf course and private residence at 900 Camden Valley Way in the south-western Sydney suburb of Gledswood Hills, New South Wales, Australia. It was built from 1827 to 1855 by James Chisholm. It is also known as Buckingham. The property is privately owned. It was added to the New South Wales State Heritage Register on 22 December 2006.

== History ==
Gabriel Louis Marie Huon de Kerilleau left France and fled to England during the French Revolution. He joined the New South Wales Corps and arrived in Sydney "in the reduced circumstances of a private soldier" under the name Gabriel Louis in the 'Surprise'in October 1794 (Carroll, 1983, 31).

He was discharged in 1807 and, because of his knowledge of (fluency in) French, became tutor to John Macarthur's sons.

Governor Macquarie granted him the 400 acres (162ha) which became 'Buckingham; as from 1 January 1810, and he called it Buckingham after the Marquis of Buckingham, who had some part in arranging his discharge.

Huon de Kerilleau employed convicts to quarry stone on the property and start his building programme. Their first project was the small cottage where they were chained each night. Then they went on to the coach house and the servants' quarters.

In 1816 Huon de Kerilleau sold the property to James Chisholm for 250 pounds and moved to a new property at Bungonia, near the future site of Goulburn. His son, Paul Huon, became a pioneer in the Wodonga district.

James Chisholm renamed the property "Gledswood", and it was he who, in about 1827, finished the main homestead. Chisholm had been involved in the rum trade in the early days of the colony. He was friendly with John Macarthur, who farmed nearby at Camden Park. They shared an interest in the wine industry, which flourished in the district.

Chisholm's son James planted a vineyard in 1830. Vinedressers Frederick and Anna Worner of Wittenberg (Germany) were imported to work the vineyard in 1847. Chisholm once wrote "There is much about the vine that renders it an attractive pursuit." The convict built cellar under the main homestead was capable of holding 20,000 bottles.

Upon receiving a land grant on Cowpastures rural downs in 1829, James and Elizabeth Chisholm built Gledswood in 1830. A large stuccoed rubble stone house was built in the style of an Indian bungalow with an attached kitchen wing and a nearby barn. The property remained in the Chisholm family for the next 90 years.

James Chisholm's son, James II (Jas), planted its vineyard c. 1830. The Macarthurs of Camden Park were friends of the Chisholms and loaned their six German vine dressers to the Chisholms on occasions until the Chisholms imported two other vine dressers of their own in 1847. Frederick and Anna Worner worked the vineyard with their six children. Jas Chisholm and his new wife Elizabeth quickly had Gledswood performing well. Besides the vineyard, they ran a fine herd of cattle and developed many breeds of sheep. Chisholm's wool brought the highest prices on the market. The estate had its own butcher shop, a great orchard and house cows which produced milk and cream. Gledswood comprised 1000 acres by 1850. Jas once wrote "there is much about the vine that renders it an attractive pursuit". The convict cellar built under the 90 square meter main house was capable of holding 20,000 bottles. James planted the estate's famous garden and his son James II developed them further.

Gledswood was extensively renovated during the c.1870s and was noted for its outstanding garden which was expanded by Charles Kinghorne Chisholm and described in the Horticultural Magazine (1870) in the same year that Maryland was featured. The garden remained a prominent feature of Gledswood and was romanticised by Hardy Wilson c. 1920. Much like Camden Park Estate, Gledswood has close association with the historical Camden district and for its involvement in pioneering Australia's wool industry.

When the Testoni brothers bought the property in 1971 from Anthony Hordern, a condition of sale was that they would re-establish its winery. This has proven very successful and Gledswood does not produce serious quantities in the new millennium. The family established 60 hectares (150 acres) of grapes, mainly classical varieties (Traminer, Trebbiano, Semillon, Barbera, Mataro, Pinot Noir, Chardonnay and Cabernet Savignon). They also established a small herd of cattle for making cheese.

In 1972 an area of 15 hectares (38 acres) was subdivided from Gledswood. In 1973 the estate was subdivided roughly in half. In 1976 an area of 10 hectares (25 acres) was transferred to Camden Council. In 1978 an area of 400 hectares (990 acres) was subdivided from Gledswood for the El Caballo Blanco equestrian enterprise.

Gledswood has been developed by the Testoni family as a tourist farm with a reduced farm curtilage. The site is owned by Caldla Pty Ltd. Gledswood is currently open to the public as a colonial working farm with additional activities such as wine tasting, wedding functions and a country restaurant. The house is currently unoccupied but is used for functions.

Through the 1980s various changes occurred at Gledswood and new structures were constructed.

== Description ==
=== Farm ===
Gledswood is set on 65 hectares (160 acres) of pastoral land. The Gledswood estate is located off Camden Valley Way south of Raby Road, Catherine Field, across from Raby homestead. Its rear (the south) of Gledswood abuts the Upper Canal water supply for Sydney. Gledswood is the first of such early farming properties visible when travelling from Sydney along Camden Valley Way (the former Hume Highway and former Cow Pasture Road).

The estate was developed by James Chisholm c. 1830 on land granted to him in 1829. Located in the centre of the property is a selection of Georgian farm buildings. The homestead was built by James Chisholm c. 1830 on land granted in 1829 and later renovated, probably in the 1870s, to include the Gothic verandas and porches; the kitchen has been separated forming a courtyard. The house has a long stone flagged front veranda on the north side with two gables breaking the eavesline and marking the entrances. Decorative features include bargeboards in a rustic pattern, shuttered french doors and a front door with fanlight and side lights. The walls are rendered brick.

The current access drive winds through open cleared paddocks and remnant advanced and regrowth woodland. Old woodland remnants such as a group of broad leaved apple trees (Angophora subvelutina) frame entry views to the homestead and the distant araucarias. Old trees in paddocks are in decline and remnants of original woodland are a prominent feature of its landscape.

A group of mature Araucarias/ hoop pines (Araucaria cunninghamii) distant from the road identify the location of the homestead long before any buildings are in view and are definitive of the 19th century landscape character, occurring in association with other typical plant species found throughout the district.

=== Outbuildings ===
The kitchen has been separated from the house and forms the courtyard. The outbuildings within the estate include: large cellars; an administration wing; a fine two storey stable building now used as a restaurant'; machinery shed; and other farm buildings such as the decorative wooden hen house.

=== Garden ===
Gledswood contains a large formal garden area and many typical 19th century ornamental plantings. Gledswood's signature plantings of tall Bunya pines are visible from roads and sites in the area.

A highly maintained lawn and formal garden in front and adjacent to the house along with pockets of bushland dominated by vines and shrubs now considered weeds, are common thematic elements of 19th century landscapes. Close to the homestead is a variety of wild hedgerow and the front of the administration building, south of the wilderness is dominated by a grove of pepper trees (Schinus molle var.areira), two of which may possibly date from the mid to late 19th century. This species is also scattered throughout the livestock yard and is around the outbuildings and have the same evocative character as the plantings of Belgenny Farm Homestead at Camden South. Further plantings in this area include an old stunted Moreton Bay Fig (Ficus macrophylla). To the south of the building is a black locust /false acacia tree (Robinia pseudoacacia).

The northern front to the homestead is in the shape of an expansive ellipse, bounded by a formal gravel driveway with a remnant planting of a lone large white cedar (Melia azedarach var.australasica) on the edge of the driveway.

The eastern garden, set out in the gardenesque style, continues this more formal thematic planting. The trees and shrubs in this area are an eclectic mix of species is typical of late 19th century and early 20th century botanical collections. A rose garden has been established east of the homestead and adjacent to this older formal garden. The eastern lawn contains further planting of jacaranda (Jacaranda mimosifolia) and other associated species. The old stunted macadamia nut tree (Macadamia integrifolia) is located south-east of the homestead and is a rare specimen planting in this district.

=== Condition ===
As at 29 July 2003, Gledswood has been left largely unaltered in design. It has archaeological potential to reviewal evidence of early European farming practices and an understanding of early gardening practices.

Gledswood has been left largely unaltered in design although adaptive re-use of the buildings and new plant material has been introduced.

=== Modifications and dates ===
- 1810 – 162 hectares (400 acres) grant to de Kerilleau (former 'Buckingham').
- 1815 – 202 hectares (500 acres) to north added (acquired by and granted to James Chisholm).
- 1816 – extension of Kerilleau grant land to the east and south (acquired by and granted to James Chisholm).
- 1818 – extension of land to the south again (former 'Horatio Park') (acquired by and granted to James Chisholm).
- 1861 – two acres set up for erection of a school building (closed 1888)
- c. 1870s – Major modifications /renovations to Gledswood homestead with the addition of Gothic verandas and porches and the expansion of existing gardens under James Kinghorne Chisholm.
- 1881–88 – land resumed for construction of The Upper Canal across the estate. Bridges built across the canal to allow access.
- 1907 – land exchange with George Molle of Molles Marnes to south, of land south of The Upper Canal. Molle's former land north of the canal (and facing Camden Valley Way) became part of Gledswood.
- 1959 – subdivision of Gledswood into three lots (east, east-of east, and west of the canal)
- 1968–71 – Horderns running cattle on estate, much repairs to buildings.
- 1971 – Testoni brothers ('Camden Vineyards') bought Gledswood, hoping to revive the vineyards, begin promoting the estate as a tourist attraction.
- 1972 – 15 hectares (38 acres) between Raby Road and the Upper Canal divided from the estate,
- 1973 – subdivision roughly divided Gledswood estate in half – over 100ha to the north and east of the house transferred to the NSW Planning & Environment Commission. Another 10 ha transferred to Camden Council in 1976. In 1978 land on which Gledswood is situated took its present form when over 400ha were subdivided for the El Caballo Blanco enterprise under the ownership of Andalusia Entertainment Centres P/L (for horse shows, tourist attraction).
- 1970s – subdivision of eastern section (1972, 3, 6, 8) of sections facing Camden Valley Way in eastern part (non-1959 lots).

Other modifications have been the adaptive re-use of buildings such as the two storey stables now used as a restaurant.

=== Further information ===
HO held discussions with a number of interested parties in 2001 concerning this site. Some of these involved retirement village style development proposals. The property was placed on the market in 2003 and sold around March 2003. Any development proposals would require a heritage impact statement which focuses on how the heritage significance of Gledswood can be retained and conserved while allowing appropriate changes.

== Heritage listing ==
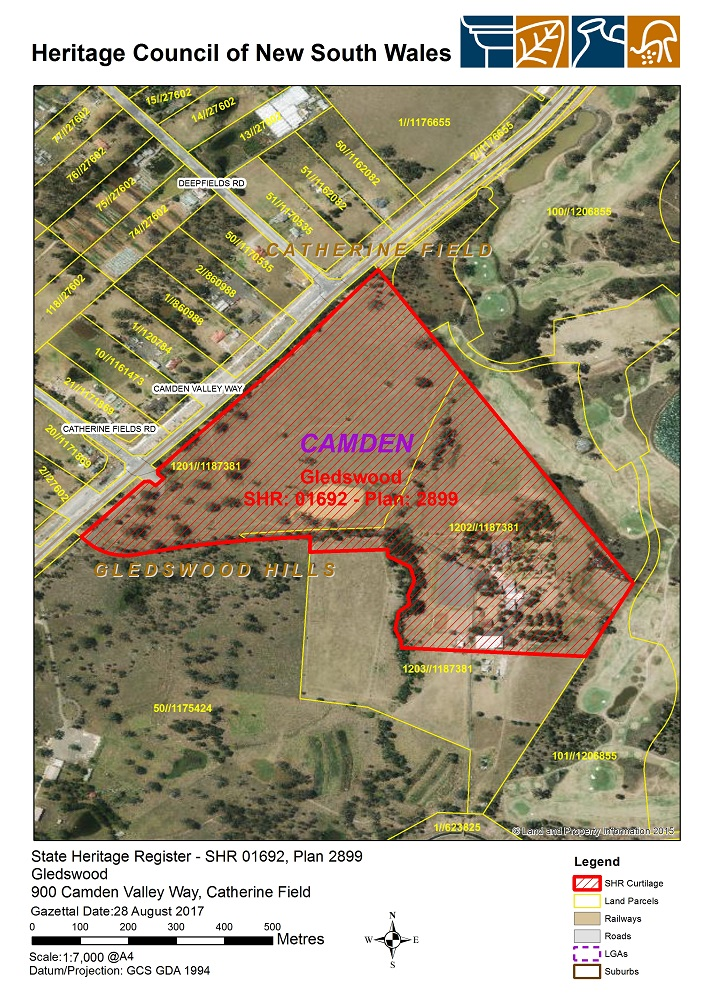
Heritage boundaries

As at 29 July 2003, Gledswood is an early 19th century farm estate that has close associations with the Camden area which is the birthplace of the Australian wool industry. Built by James Chisholm in c. 1830, Gledswood remained the Chisholm family residence for 90 years. A prominent feature at Gledswood is an outstanding colonial garden that was expanded in 1870. The garden featured in Horticultural Magazine (1870) and was romanticised by Hardy Wilson in 1920. The intense and continual interest in gardening at Gledswood has made Gledswood a prominent contributor to the art of gardening within NSW.

Gledswood has historical significance for its association with the early development of Australia's wine industry. James Chisholm junior planted a vineyard in 1830, and in 1847 vinedressers from Germany were imported to work it. A convict built cellar under the homestead was capable of holding 20,000 bottles of wine.

Gledswood was listed on the New South Wales State Heritage Register on 22 December 2006 having satisfied the following criteria.

The place is important in demonstrating the course, or pattern, of cultural or natural history in New South Wales.

The Gledswood Estate was built by James Chisholm c.1830 on land granted to him in 1829 and was upgraded in 1870 to include planned renovations to the buildings and extensions to the gardens that followed within the style of colonial style design.

The place has a strong or special association with a person, or group of persons, of importance of cultural or natural history of New South Wales's history.

Gledswood's outstanding 19th century garden was mentioned in the Horticultural Magazine c. 1870 and by William Hardy Wilson c. 1920 Gledswood remained in the Chisholm family for 90 years and has a strong association with the Camden district.

The place is important in demonstrating aesthetic characteristics and/or a high degree of creative or technical achievement in New South Wales.

Romanticised by William Hardy Wilson, Gledswood contains one of the best of the Cowpasturers gardens.

The place has a strong or special association with a particular community or cultural group in New South Wales for social, cultural or spiritual reasons.

Gledswood estate has a strong association with the Camden district. Gledswood's unique character is recognised by well maintained colonial gardens and buildings that offer a historic rural character.

The place has potential to yield information that will contribute to an understanding of the cultural or natural history of New South Wales.

Gledswood has potential to yield information on colonial settlement within Cowpastures rural downs, and in a wider sense, Camden and Cumberland County. This information combined with other studies within the area will contribute to a better understanding of New South Wales' cultural history.

The place possesses uncommon, rare or endangered aspects of the cultural or natural history of New South Wales.

Gledswood is a rare example of an early Australian homestead characterised by mid 19th century gardens and ornamental plantings.

The place is important in demonstrating the principal characteristics of a class of cultural or natural places/environments in New South Wales.

Gledswood is representative of early colonial settlement patterns in the Cowpastures rural downs area. Gledswood's colonial gardens is presentative of traditional European influenced landscapes and of 19th and early 20th century interest in botanical collections.

== See also ==
- Australian residential architectural styles
