= George Chalmers =

George Chalmers may refer to:

- George Chalmers (artist) (died 1791), Scottish artist
- George Chalmers (antiquarian) (1742–1825), Scottish antiquarian and political writer
- George Paul Chalmers (1833–1878), Scottish painter
- George Chalmers (baseball) (1888–1960), Major League baseball player
- George Edward Chalmer Hayes (1894–1968), American lawyer
- George V. Chalmers (1907–1984), American college athlete
- George Everett Chalmers (1905–1993), Canadian doctor, surgeon and political figure
- George Chalmers (American football), American football player
