= William Cowper (Archdeacon of Cumberland) =

William Cowper (28 December 1778 – 6 July 1858) was an English-born Anglican cleric in Australia who was the Archdeacon of Cumberland. His son, also named William Cowper, was later the Dean of Sydney.

== Australia ==
Early in 1808 Rev. Samuel Marsden, in search of two additional chaplains, came to Cowper's parish and invited him to accept appointment. He was willing and received a commission as an assistant chaplain in New South Wales at a salary of £260. His departure from England was delayed by the death of his wife, then the mother of three sons, including Charles, later a leading politician, and one daughter. Cowper married Ann Barrell, and sailed with his family to Port Jackson, arriving in August 1809. He took up duties as minister of St Philip's Church, then being completed. For the first ten years of his ministry, he was the only clergyman permanently in Sydney.

== Late life ==
The burden of Cowper's clerical and official duties took their toll. In 1812 he had suffered from some form of rheumatic fever, probably contracted in the gaols, and his slow recovery marked the beginning of a life of constant ill health. Reports of this ill health were made in 1818 and 1829 by William Grant Broughton, Marsden and Darling, but it was not until February 1842 that the formation of cataracts on both eyes compelled him to take leave and return to England for treatment. The loss in 1831 of his second wife, mother of William Macquarie Cowper, had also told on him. On 1 March 1836 he had married Harriette Swaine, to whom were born two further children. The address of farewell and appreciation presented to him on his departure from Sydney by his parishioners and the citizens of Sydney revealed the esteem in which he was held, and the gift that went with it paid all the expenses of his journey to England. The treatment of his eyes seems to have been entirely successful and he was able to return to his duties. While in England he received a Lambeth D.D. In 1848 Bishop Broughton collated him to the archdeaconry of Cumberland.
