= William Cowper (Dean of Sydney) =

Australian Anglican archdeacon

William Macquarie Cowper
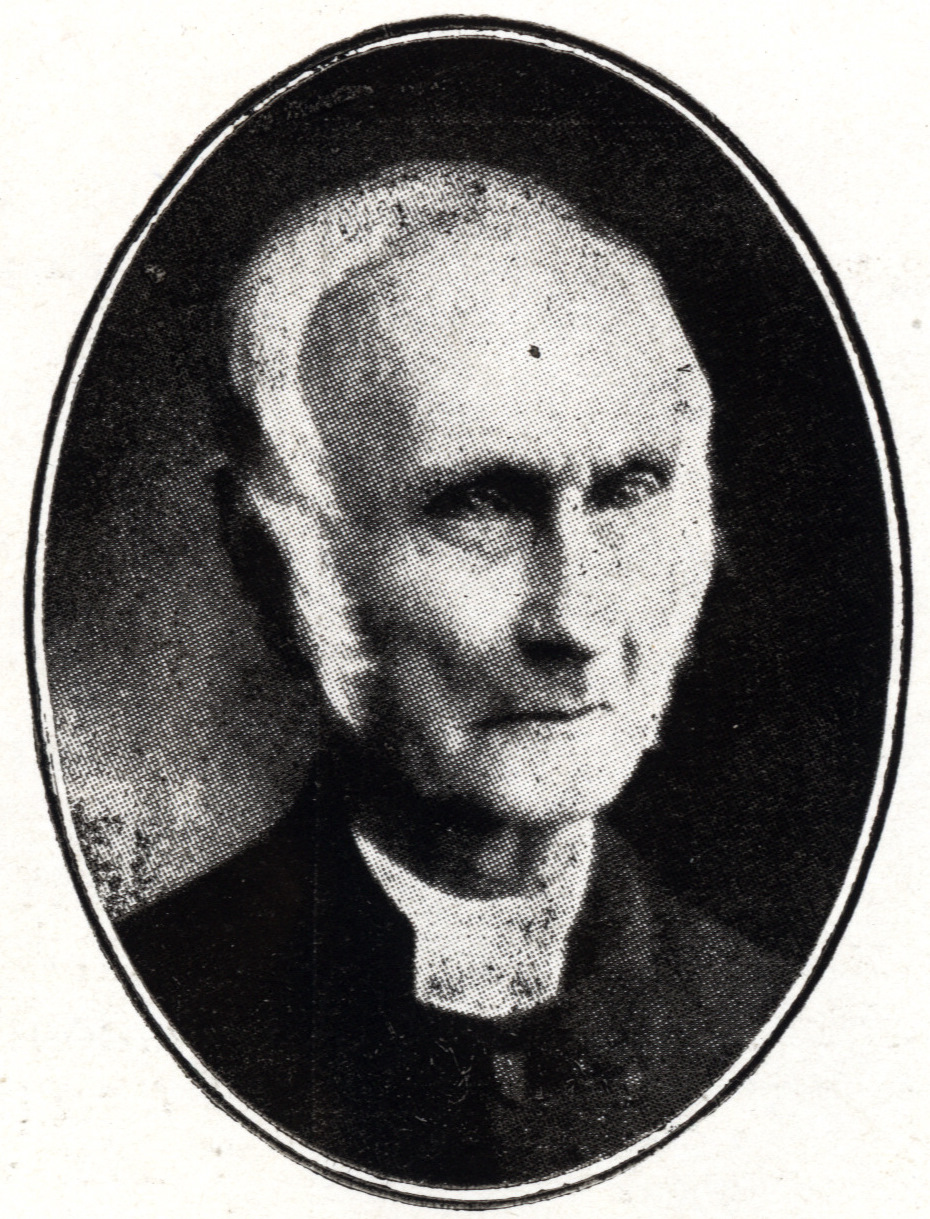
- Born: July 3, 1810; Sydney, Australia
- Died: June 14, 1902 (aged 91); Deanery in Sydney, Australia
- Burial place: St Jude's cemetery, Randwick.
- Education: Magdalen Hall (BA, MA)
- Title: Archdeacon and Dean of Sydney

William Macquarie Cowper (known in his youth as Macquarie; 3 July 1810 – 14 June 1902) was an Australian Anglican archdeacon and Dean of Sydney.

Cowper was born in Sydney, the son of the Revd William Cowper, assistant colonial chaplain, and his second wife, Ann (née Barrell) . Educated by his father and at the University of Oxford, he graduated BA from Magdalen Hall in 1833 and MA in 1835. Following admission to deacon´s order, he was appointed curate of St Petrox, Dartmouth, and ordained priest at Exeter in 1834. He returned to Australia in 1836 and was made chaplain at Port Stephens, New South Wales where he remained for 20 years. He then became Acting Principal of Moore Theological College, Sydney, for a few months after the college opened at Liverpool on 1 March 1856, following which he became incumbent of St. John's, Bishopthorpe. He was married twice in his life and had children.

Cowper died, aged 91, at the Deanery in Sydney on 14 June 1902, and was buried at St Jude's cemetery, Randwick.
