= Bank of Australia =

Early colonial bank in New South Wales (1826–1843)

- Company type: Bank
- Founded: 1826
- Defunct: 1843
- Headquarters: Sydney, Australia
- Area served: Colony of New South Wales

The Bank of Australia was a failed financial institution of early colonial New South Wales. It was formed in 1826 and collapsed in 1843.

== Founding ==
The Bank of Australia was formed in 1826 by a producers' and merchants' group as a rival to the Bank of New South Wales. The bank opened on 3 July 1826 in George Street, Sydney. The first directors of the bank were: Thomas Macvitie (managing director), Edward Wollstonecraft, John Macarthur, Richard Jones, Thomas Icely, John Oxley, George Bunn, W.J. Browne, Hannibal Macarthur, James Norton, and A.B. Spark.

It was dubbed the "pure merino" bank because its share register included the plutocracy of the colony, but excluded the ex-convicts who had been associated with the Bank of New South Wales.

== 1828 bank theft ==
In September 1828, thieves tunnelled into the Bank of Australia in Lower George Street, Sydney and stole about £14,000, described in 2008 as "the largest documented bank theft" in Australian history (in relative values and expressed as a proportion of GDP).

== Collapse ==
When investors responded to the depression of the late 1830s by the abrupt withdrawal of capital, leading to a chain of insolvencies, a number of colonial banks found that their unrestricted lending had sent land prices soaring as speculators borrowed to invest, especially in urban areas. When the banks called in these loans further insolvencies occurred, and a number of banks, including the Bank of Australia, failed in 1843. A number of leading colonial figures lost their fortunes, with many taking advantage of the Insolvent Debtors Act 1841.
