= Menangle Park railway station =

Railway station in New South Wales, Australia

Menangle Park
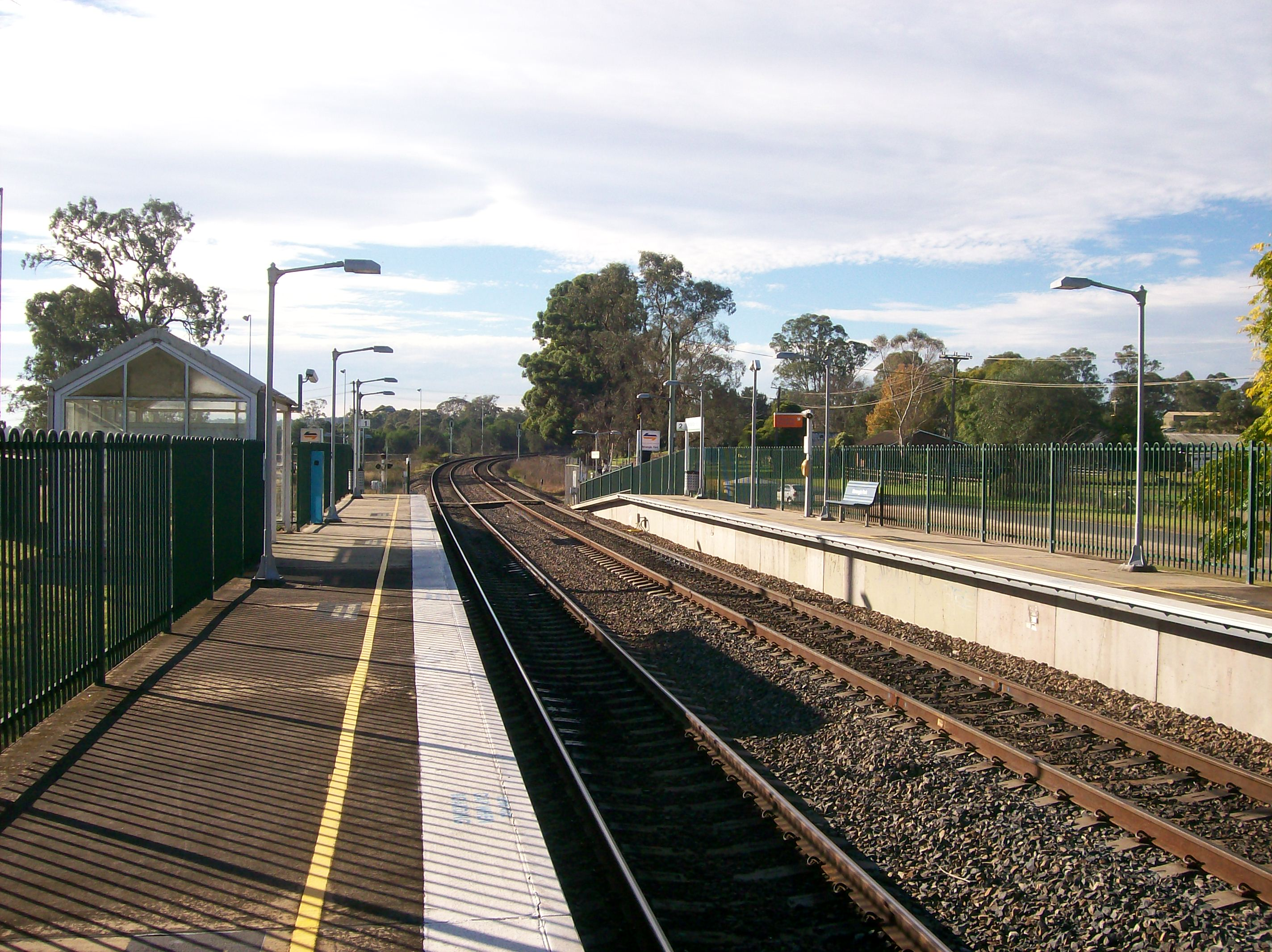
- Northbound view from Platform 1, January 2006

General information
- Location: Racecourse Drive, Menangle Park; Australia
- Coordinates: 34°06′13″S 150°44′42″E
- Elevation: 79 metres (259 ft)
- Owner: Transport Asset Manager of New South Wales
- Operator: Sydney Trains
- Line: Main Southern
- Distance: 62.85 kilometres (39.05 miles) from Central
- Platforms: 2 side
- Tracks: 2
- Connections: Bus

Construction
- Structure type: Ground
- Parking: Commuter carpark available
- Accessible: Assisted Access

Other information
- Station code: MEK
- Website: Transport for NSW

History
- Opened: 26 September 1937

Passengers
- 2025: 8,298 (year); 23 (daily) (Sydney Trains, NSW TrainLink)

Services
Preceding station	Intercity Trains	Following station
Menangle towards Moss Vale or Goulburn	Southern Highlands Line	Macarthur towards Campbelltown or Central
Location

Menangle Park railway station is located on the Main Southern line in New South Wales, Australia. It serves the town of Menangle Park, opening on 26 September 1937.

Menangle Park previously had two additional platforms and run rounds to service the adjacent Menangle Park Paceway. These opened in 1914 and closed in 1963 with the platforms still in situ.

== Platforms and services ==
Menangle Park has two side platforms. It is serviced by Sydney Trains Southern Highlands Line services travelling between Campbelltown and Moss Vale with 2 weekend morning services to Sydney Central and limited evening services to Goulburn. Both platforms are 2 cars long. Opal validators are provided, however there are no top up or ticket issuing facilities.

Platform	Line	Stopping pattern	Notes
1	SHL	services to Campbelltown; 2 weekend morning services to Sydney Central	
2	SHL	services to Moss Vale evening services to Goulburn (2 weekday, 1 weekend)	

The station has two crossovers to the south, as the section around Glenlee Junction (to the north of Menangle Park) is bidirectional.

== Transport links ==
Transit Systems operates one bus route via Menangle Park station, under contract to Transport for NSW:

- 889: Menangle to Campbelltown
