= Glenlee, Menangle Park =

Glenlee
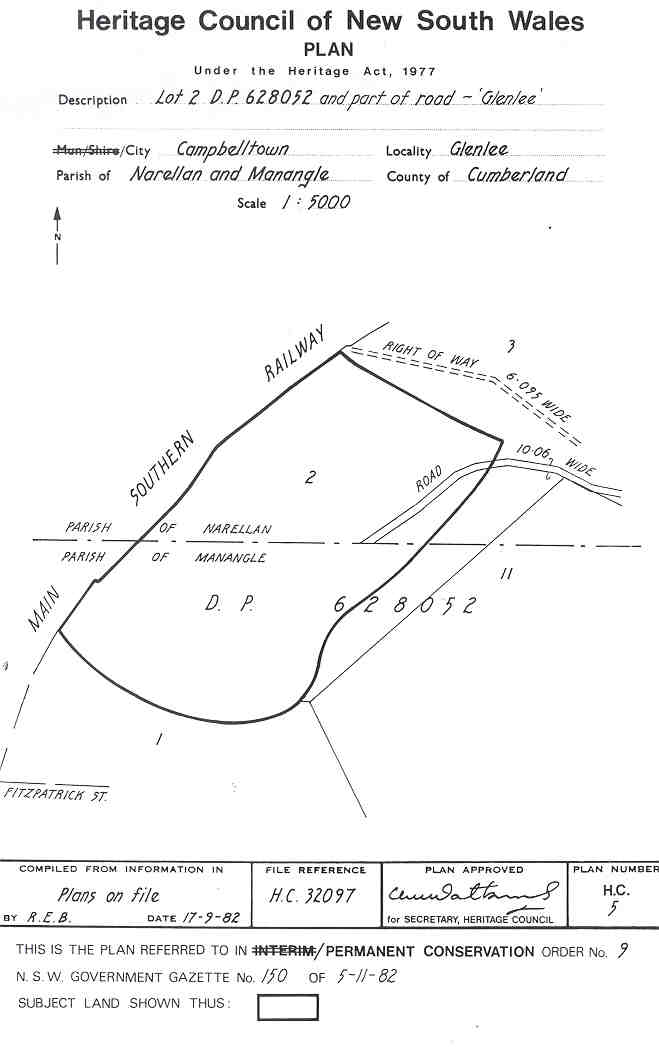
- Heritage boundaries

- Location within Sydney Location within Australia
- 34°05′18″S 150°45′29″E
- Location: Glenlee Road, Menangle Park, City of Campbelltown, New South Wales, Australia

History
- Built: 1824–1859

Site notes
- Architect: Henry Kitchen

New South Wales Heritage Register
- Official name: Glenlee, outbuildings, garden & gatelodge
- Type: State heritage (landscape)
- Designated: 2 April 1999
- Reference no.: 9
- Type: Homestead Complex
- Category: Farming and Grazing
- Builders: Robert Gooch and Nathaniel Payton

Glenlee is a heritage-listed rural property on the urban fringe of Sydney, Australia. Located on Glenlee Road, Menangle Park, New South Wales, the homestead and outbuildings were designed by Henry Kitchen and built from 1824 to 1859 by Robert Gooch and Nathaniel Payton. It was added to the New South Wales State Heritage Register on 2 April 1999, with the listing referring to known as Glenlee, outbuildings, garden & gatelodge.

== History ==
The Dharawal Aboriginal people were the occupants of the area until the Europeans arrived and they recorded, in a sandstone shelter nearby, the cattle which had escaped from the first British settlement at Sydney Cove in 1788 and established themselves on the good grazing ground in the Menangle-Camden district (which came to be called "the Cow Pastures"). When the first squatters arrived in the district after 1800 there was no initial conflict, but the acceleration of the process of land grants produced increasing tension between the settlers and the Aboriginal people, culminating in the Appin Massacre in 1816. Gradually after that the number of Aborigines diminished through disease and alienation of their traditional hunting grounds.

Following the lead of the wild cattle, the earliest use of the Mount Annan district by farmers was for cattle grazing. By 1810 John Macarthur held 2,833 hectares (7,000 acres) at Camden Park on the west side of the Nepean River and in 1818 Governor Macquarie granted 1,214 hectares (3,000 acres) on the eastern side of the river to William Howe, a Scottish free settler who had arrived in 1816. Howe's estate was called Glenlee after his birthplace in Scotland.

Howe who was an agricultural entrepreneur, Magistrate and later a Superintendent of Police.

By 1820 he had expanded his property to over 2,833 hectares (7,000 acres) and was shipping wool to London. Between 1821 and 1823 Glenlee produced wheat and meat for the government stores. He was also produced dairy products for the Sydney market in the 1820s.

The homestead was designed in 1823 by Henry Kitchen, the first non-convict architect and built for William and Mary Howe in 1823–24, partly on land Howe had purchased in 1816 from Michael Hayes. Convict labour was used to establish the farm and build the outbuildings, with Howe declaring that he had 9 acres of garden or orchard in the 1822 muster (in a total of 2,914 hectares (7,200 acres) which he held through grant, lease or purchase) . Robert Gooch and Nathaniel Payton were contracted to build the homestead in April 1823 to a plan by Henry Kitchen. By 1824 Howe had occupied Glenlee House which he had built to a design by architect Henry Kitchen.

By the 1828 census Howe's land transactions had stabilised to a holding of 1,416 hectares (3,500 acres) – 405 hectares (1,000 acres) cleared and 202 hectares (500 acres) cultivated. In 1832 the "New South Wales Calendar and General Post Office Directory" described the gardens as "extensive, the vinery being in a forward state".

Howe was the first magistrate of the county of Airds.

In 1833 Mrs Felton Mathew described the farm "a nearer spot is "Glenlee", the proprietor of which is also an old settler is distinguished by his attention to the cultivation of English grasses: the best, if not the only hay in the country, is grown here: and Mr Howe has, it is said, laid out his grounds with true good taste in the best English style, dividing the meadows with hedges instead of the rough wooden fences everywhere use: many other large tracts of cleared land we could distinguish from our elevated situation". Mrs Mathew also continued, noting that the principal crop in the district was wheat, and "peas are grown in fields about here, the only part of the country in which I have seen them so cultivated".

By 1834 the property was regarded as one of the finest in the colony with meadows divided by hedges of quince and lemon trees and an established vinery. Glenlee's famous butter, Sun and Thistle, was the first ever exported to England from New South Wales.

In 1837 the Reverend John Dunmore Lang visited Glenlee and described it: "About three miles beyond Campbelltown to the right is the dairy farm or estate of Glenlee – there is a large extent of cleared land on the Glenlee estate, the greater part of which has been laid down with English grasses, the paddocks being separated from each other by hedges of quince or lemon tree – the usual but seldom used Colonial substitutes for the hawthorn. The country is of an undulating character, and the scenery from Glenlee House – a handsome two-storey house built partly of brick and partly of a drab-coloured sandstone – is rich and most agreeably diversified".

Glenlee estate as one of the best dairy farms in the colony was unusual and half a century before dairying was generally practised in the district it was adopted here (i.e.: in the 1820s).

During the 1830s, '40s and '50s Glenlee, famous for its "Sun and Thistle" butter, was largely farmed by tenants. Some dairy products were exported to England. Speculation and the 1840s depression led to Glenlee being mortgaged but the family remained lessees.

Howe died in 1855 and his wife sold the property to James Fitzpatrick and it remained in his family (with various subdivisions to members of the family) until 1968 when it was purchased by the State Planning Authority, which gazetted it as a place of historic interest in 1973.

Fitzpatrick had come to Australia as a convict in 1822 and worked as a servant of Hamilton Hume, the explorer and farmer. Fitzpatrick's crime was described as "insurrection" but it is not clear just what was the cause or details. When Captain William Hovell (who had been granted 283 hectares (700 acres) of adjoining land to the north at "Naralling Grange" in 1816) and his colleague Hamilton Hume organised their famous 1824 expedition to find the land route to the southern coast of Victoria, they chose Fitzpatrick to be in the party as an assigned convict. Hovell, in his diary in 1825, described James Fitzpatrick as 'a gentleman who in an unfortunate moment committed an offence for which he is enduring a punishment far too severe".

After the expedition and through various opportunities, Fitzpatrick became prosperous in the colony as a farmer and land owner. He bought the large "Glenlee" estate in the late 1850s and extended his property all the way through (north) to Narellan, including the land first owned by Hovell. When Fitzpatrick died, three children inherited the land and his daughter Elizabeth married Edward Sedgwick and built the present "Narellan Grange" house in 1894. The name of Sedgwick was then associated with the property (Narellan Grange) until well into the 20th century. Edward Sedgwick was mayor of Campbelltown in 1899. His son Frederick Joseph "Mate" Sedgwick, was a prominent dairy industry leader and the producers' representative director on the NSW Milk Board for many years.

The route for the new Southern Railway line was surveyed in 1857. When constructed in 1866, the line was sited in a cutting in close proximity to Glenlee house, maintaining views from the house over the property. James Fitzpatrick by the 1860s owned most of the farms west from Campbelltown toward Narellan and many south toward Menangle.

In the 1850s the dairy operation appears to have dwindled and sheep production increased. In the 1870s a large part of the estate was leased to small tenant farmers who produced fruit and vegetables. These included a Chinese migrant, "Old Shoo" who maintained a flourishing market garden adjacent to the railway tracks. The estate at this time was probably dotted with as many as two dozen cottages within walking distance of the main homestead.

In 1883 the colonnade was rebuilt on the main facade. In the 1890s the house underwent considerable remodelling. It was rendered in stucco, resashed, the front door replaced, the chair boards and other original joinery details removed inside. C.1900 the roof, originally shingled, was replaced by corrugated iron. The interior walls were wallpapered (and remained so until the 1970s) (Kemp, 2001).

Before Appin was so well catered for by the shop keepers, horses and carts would pay weekly visits almost from the turn of the (20th) century, coming from Campbelltown, Menangle and other places, loaded with groceries, fruit and vegetables, drapery, etc. The earliest I recall would be a Chinaman's vegetable cart which would travel over from Glenlee, where there was a big garden on the bank of the Nepean River.

In 1905 Glenlee (3500 acres) remained the largest farm in the district, and was leased to Conroy and Doyle, who planned converting it into a sheep farm (this was overturned by a public meeting at the time). Three dairies were still active on the estate, and 24 hectares (60 acres) were given over to market gardens, employing 32.

In 1910 John Glenlee Fitzpatrick took up residence at Glenlee, neighbouring Smeaton Grange was occupied by James Fitzpatrick's daughter Elizabeth Sedgwick and the other daughter lived at nearby Kilbride overlooking Mount Gilead. The family operated their own dairy at Glenlee and employed herdsmen.

In 1911 a NSW Minister of Health decided on Glenlee as a possible location for a mental institution. When the Fitzpatricks refused to sell, he threatened to take 500 acres of the property over. As a delaying tactic, part of the land at issue was sold to a miner, Mr Clinton, as a place to store his coal. With a change of government these plans were dropped. Clinton later began dumping coal at Glenlee again in 1959.

Shortly before World War I began in 1914, local architect Alfred Rose Payten suggested to James Glenlee Fitzpatrick that the property would be a good location for a race track and in 1914 Menangle Park Racecourse was built nearby.

In the 1930s the original chimney pieces were replaced and new bathrooms installed

Higginbotham's examination of a 1947 aerial photograph concluded that "land on the alluvial flats to the east of the main hose at Glenlee formed the centre for historical land cultivation. Remaining land on Glenlee does not appear to have been extensively cultivated and was more likely used for pasture." Adequate pasture was an essential part of dairying.

When the NSW Government's proposal to resume Glenlee for a new mental hospital was debated from 1946 to 1950, the local member Jeff Bate argued vigorously against the move as Glenlee was still a working dairy farm and market garden (likely the area of intensive cultivation) with 32 employees and of historical importance.

In 1949 the property had three working dairies and part of a fourth on it, and supplied 1,200,000 pints of milk to the city through the Campbelltown Depot of Dairy Farmers Cooperative Company Ltd. The Fitzpatricks at that time were pure (stock) breeders. The Campbelltown-Camden-Picton area at that time was the centre for the breeding of Ayrshire cattle for the Commonwealth and the Fitzpatricks had stud stock on the property which had won prizes against such famous breeders of Ayrshires as the McIntosh brothers (of Denbigh) and Camden Park Estate Ltd, at the Camden, Campbelltown and Royal Sydney Shows. Objections to the proposed mental hospital came from the Cumberland County Council, Milk Board, Metropolitan Water Sewerage and Drainage Board and Campbelltown Municipal Council.

Glenlee was acquired by the State Planning Authority/ Macarthur Development Board in 1968/9. In 1969 architect John Fisher (member of the Institute of Architects, the Cumberland County Council Historic Buildings Committee and on the first Council of the National Trust of Australia (NSW) after its reformation in 1960) was commissioned by the State Planning Authority to restore the first five houses in Campbelltown, which had been resumed under the Cumberland County Planning Scheme. They included Glenalvon House.

In 1978 the house was listed on the Register of the National Estate and in 1977/8 received National Estate Funding of $33,000 which funded waterproofing works. 1977/8 it received National Estate Funding of $33,000 funding restoration of house focussing on waterproofing works. A new kitchen was added. Interiors were restored substantially to their 1820s appearance, except for the drawing room which was maintained in its 1890s style. Many original features e.g.: painting scheme, were uncovered with removal of wallpapers.

In 1982 the house and part of its estate (bounded by the Main Southern Railway on the west) was made subject of a Permanent Conservation Order under the NSW Heritage Act 1977. Meanwhile, the larger estate was designated a Scenic Protection zone in 1975 and part of it set aside for development of a botanic garden in 1984.

In 1988 Mount Annan Botanic Garden was opened, administered by the Royal Botanic Gardens, Sydney, as Australia's largest botanic garden devoted entirely to native flora.

Glenlee house and its surrounding land have since been sold back into private ownership on 18 hectares (45 acres). In 1983 damaged sections of stair wall were restored by William Whitlam and much Georgian cedar joinery was renewed.

In 1984 old cobblestones were gradually uncovered, a bathroom altered from its 1930s style to a simple, modern style, landscaping under Michael Lehany and James Broadbent was undertaken to restore its earlier geometry and reinstate the main western front as the main focus and screen the coal wash to the west. Restoration of the slab building stables (predating 1842) also occurred. An olive grove (7000 trees) has been established by the current owners (growing olives and making extra virgin olive oil) on higher land to the southeast and north-eastern sides of the homestead in the c. 1990s.

Until the 1950s the Glenlee and Camden Park estates comprised an uninterrupted rural landscape spanning the Nepean River. However increasing production of coal from the Burragorang/ Nattai River mines to the southwest, and the need to transport it to the export loading plant at Balmain in Sydney, led to construction by the Joint Coal Board of a washery and transhipment facility at Glenlee, between Mount Annan and the river, in the 1950s. Coal mining had become an increasingly important industry from the 1930s. A two kilometre rail spur to this facility, named Clinton's siding, was constructed from the Main Southern Railway in December 1958. The line was electrified as part of the extension of metropolitan railway electrification to Campbelltown in 1968.

The use of the coal facility peaked in the 1960s and 1970s but was scaled down from the late 1980s due to its potential environmental impact on the Nepean River, though the facility remains in use and is a significant element in the local landscape.

In 1993 the Glenlee Composting Facility commenced operation on the site, producing soil mixes, mulches and topdressing material for rehabilitation of the coal facility and for the horticultural and landscaping industries.

== Description ==
=== Farm ===
Significant colonial rural cultural landscape, with deliberately sited curving entrance road to give dramatic view of homestead group and river and mountains beyond, past a gate lodge, a square stuccoed brick building with a hipped, originally timber shingled roof, later corrugated iron-clad.

Wider landscape is of grazed paddocks, with stands of remnant older indigenous trees, particularly on higher ground. An olive grove has been established southeast and northeast of the house in the c.1990s.

=== Homestead Group ===
A careful composition of homestead and outbuildings and gardens, on a raised platform for wide views to the south, west and north. A fine composition of farm/ estate outbuildings lie to the south/south-east of the homestead, uphill. Historic vineyards were also on this southern/south-eastern side of the homestead.

Remnant core estate including formal drive access way of a rare colonial farm estate, with important individual elements including:

- the 1820s homestead;
- outbuildings to the homestead's south and south-east, forming a courtyard;
- farm buildings further to the south-east;
- a gatehouse (now a ruin) and nearby relatively-recently built Olive processing building on the approach drive;
- and various lawns and garden plantings.

=== Garden ===
Plantings include a signature bunya-bunya pine (Araucaria bidwillii) south-east of the house, a huge forest red gum (Eucalyptus tereticornis) and silky oak (Grevillea robusta) north-west of the house. Impressive garden around homestead with many older remnant plantings, including pines and angophoras. Other mature trees north-west of the house include Mediterranean cypress (Cupressus sempervirens), European olive (Olea africana var.europeana cv.). Other mature plantings include a huge old kurrajong (Brachychiton populneus) near the stables block east of the house, a Brazilian pepper(corn) tree (Schinus molle var.areira) east of the house, a privet hedge (Ligustrum spp.) north-east of the house. Younger contributory plantings include brush box trees (Lophostemon confertus) and jacaranda (J.mimosifolia) south-west of the house.

Views and framing plantings

The homestead enjoys a broad panoramic view (southwest to northwest) across the Great Southern Railway line to and an important visual connection between the Great Dividing Range, Nepean River and Camden Park estate ridgeline. Low Cape honeysuckle (Tecomaria capensis) hedges underline the panoramic views out to Mount Annan in the north-west, and frame views west and south-west towards Camden Park, the Razorback and the Great Dividing Ranges. Lower again hedges of sweet box (Murraya paniculata) and Cape leadwort (Plumbago capensis) define inner areas of garden such as a rear "courtyard" east of the house. Beds of hardy perennials and ground covers such as Nile / African lilies (Agapanthus praecox), bird-of-paradise flower (Strelitzia reginae).

There is a view of Glenlee homestead and its broad landscape opening up suddenly near the crest of the access road (Glenlee Road) from off Menangle Road.

=== Homestead ===
Regency Colonial homestead, two storeys, of brick and sandstone. Very formal Palladian composition inspired more by Palladio's work and writing rather than by English Whig country architecture's usual interpretation of it.

Single range building, with a substantial central stair hall projecting into the rear verandahs, one room to either side and box rooms at the corners in enclosed bays. Unusual recessed verandah on main facade. By recessing the ground floor verandah into the body of the house in the form of a portico or loggia (southwest face) the main rooms on the upper floor became disproportionally larger – by half as much again, than those on the ground floor. Also unusual is the cantilevered stone staircase at the rear (east) of the house, reputedly the oldest such staircase in Australia.

Continuous sill or string course to the first floor windows. Projecting externally expressed stairwell in square form.

Gabled or pedimented detached single storey offices on south side, was kitchen and offices and housing for domestic staff, while the convicts were locked up in the cellar below. The dairy operation was inside the servants' quarters, or rather, these grew up around it.

The work resembles that of Francis Greenway, Colonial Architect, based on Kitchen's death in 1822 and similarities in design with Greenway's Liverpool hospital and other works.

Outbuildings

- outbuildings to the homestead's south and south-east, forming a courtyard

Farm Buildings

- Farm buildings further to the south-east; including a slab stables (rebuilt after damage by a fire); and further outbuildings now functioning as an outdoor entertaining area for events.

Gate House and Olive-Processing Shed

- A gatehouse (now a ruin) and nearby relatively-recently built Olive processing building on the approach drive

=== Condition ===
Much of the land with the exception of close to the homestead group, has been ploughed to plant olive trees.

Condition of house and main outbuildings is good, post 1980s restoration works.

=== Modifications and dates ===
- 1818 3000 acre grant
- 1823 new barn burnt down
- 1827 sale of 420 acres
- 1828 3500 acres in consolidated estate
- 1839 Howe bought back 420 acres sold in 1827 and several other adjoining lots.
- c. 1840s converted from wheat cropping to dairy farm.
- 1850s mainly focussed on sheep production
- 1857 Main Southern Railway line surveyed and
- 1866 railway constructed through estate in a cutting west of the house.
- 1870s part of estate leased to small tenant farmers for fruit and vegetable production
- 1879 first major house alteration – stairwall redocrated in imitation of Siena amrble by Campbelltown painter Robert Campion
- 1883 colonnade rebuilt on the main facade.
- 1890s house underwent considerable remodelling. It was rendered in stucco, resashed, the front door replaced, the chair boards and other original jointery details removed inside.
- c. 1900 the roof, originally shingled, was replaced by corrugated iron. The interior walls were wallpapered (and remained so until the 1970s).
- 1911 part of estate sold to miner, Mr Clinton, coal dumping began
- 1914 Menangle Park Racetrack created on part of the estate
- In the 1930s the original chimney pieces were replaced and new bathrooms installed.
- 1950s coal washery and transhipment facility and rail siding/spur constructed to west of estate, between Mt. Annan & river.
- 1959 coal dumping on Clinton's siding commenced again
- 1977/78 received National Estate Funding of $33,000 which funded estoration of house focussing on waterproofing works. A new kitchen was added. Restoration of interiors substantially to their 1820s appearance, except for the drawing room which was maintained in its 1890s style. Many original features e.g.: painting scheme, were uncovered with removal of wallpapers.
- 1980s winding down of coal dumping
- 1983 damaged sections of stair wall restored by William Whitla and much Georgian cedar joinery renewed.
- 1984 old cobblestones were gradually uncovered, bathroom altered from its 1930s style to a simple, modern style, landscaping under Michael Lehany and James Broadbent to restore its earlier geometry and reinstate the main western front as the main focus, and screen the coal wash to the west. Restoration of slab building stables (predating 1842).
- 1985 onward property is 45 acres,
- c. 1999 some planted with 7000 olive trees in the higher land east and south of the homestead producing olio nuovo and milder late-harvest oil.
- 2002 new olive processing shed constructed near original gatehouse, and gatehouse conserved and stabilised and reused as a display/sale room for visitors to the property.

=== Further information ===
Currently zoned non urban (minimum 40 ha lots), and open space under IDO 15. Setting particularly to the shouth and east is under threat from urban development (Menangle Park local expansion, with Landcom, APP & Campbelltown City Council involved.

== Heritage listing ==
As at 22 February 2012, the Glenlee estate is a rural cultural landscape of exceptional significance including elements of Aboriginal heritage significance, association with early influential European settlers and the exceptional composition of the architecture and landscape setting of the homestead group.

It is the core remnant including the accessway of the Glenlee estate, an important and rare surviving early 19th century pastoral holding in the Mount Annan/Menangle district of the Cow Pastures once considered as one of the best and earliest dairy farms in the colony. The estate was one of the first farms in Sydney's west to make the change from cereal cropping to dairying in the 19th century and the property continued to prosper throughout the 19th and 20th centuries.

The landscape of the area of the estate is of exceptional aesthetic value as a rare reminder of the former pastoral industry which once characterised the area. It is still possible to appreciate the siting of the homestead in view of, and with frontage to, the Nepean River as part of the original land grant. The mid-19th century Southern Railway, though sited close to the homestead group, was constructed to maintain this visual relationship. The siting of the homestead group in a context of undulating landform, is an outstanding example of colonial landscape planning to form a picturesque composition with direct sightlines to the neighbouring Camden Park estate and the Great Dividing Range.

The Glenlee homestead group is a rare and significant complex of buildings and plantings, approached by a formal drive and sited with commanding views over the countryside to the west and south-west. It includes the remnant core of a rare early colonial farm estate focussed on the fine and sophistocated Regency design of the main house with its rare recessed portico. In addition it includes its original servants' wing, outbuildings, farm buildings, a gatehouse and early plantings including a landmark bunya pine near the house.

The homestead dates from 1823 and is one of only a handful of early surviving colonial houses in the Sydney region, remarkable for its level of integrity and its original setting on the estate amongst 19th century farm buildings and plantings. It demonstrates exceptional architectural sophistocation for the period of construction (c.1823) and a rare example of Old Colonial Regency style, of which both Henry Kitchen and Francis Greenway (both of whom the house's design has been attributed to) were key practitioners.

Glenlee is significant for its association with free settler William Howe and family. Howe established the estate, was instrumental in establishing the Bank of NSW in Camden, and an important early free colonist who did much to promote pastoral interests in Sydney's west, and was one of the first farmers in the district to successfully make the change from cereal cropping to dairying.

Glenlee is also significant for its association with emancipated convict James Fitzpatrick and his family, who were responsible for the continued expansion of the estate and for its operation as a successful dairy farm. The family were prominent local citizens and remained in residence at Glenlee for over a century, demonstrating a remarkable pattern of continued usage of the property.

Howe and Fitzpatrick families held Glenlee from c. 1822 to 1859 and 1859 to 1968/9 respectively, and the history of these families on the estate is a microcosm of the development of colonial Australia in the 19th and early 20th centuries.

Glenlee is also significant for its association with Colonial architect Henry Kitchen, and also with Colonial Architect Francis Greenway, who may have played a role in its redesign.

The area close to the house has high archaeological potential associated with its occupation and use by the Dharawal Aboriginal people prior to and immediately after European settlement, and for its association with the former pastoral uses of the estate, its outbuildings and former outbuildings. The area presents some opportunities to study and interpret the lifestyle and culture of the Dharawal people, through interpretation of the landscape and the discovery of associated artefacts. It also presents opportunities to study and interpret the former pastoral and continuing agricultural uses of the estate and area.

Glenlee was listed on the New South Wales State Heritage Register on 2 April 1999.
