= New South Wales Greenhouse Gas Abatement Scheme =

Emissions trading scheme in New South Wales, Australia

The New South Wales Greenhouse Gas Abatement Scheme (also known as GGAS) was a mandatory greenhouse gas emissions trading scheme that aimed to lower greenhouse gas emissions in New South Wales, Australia, to 7.27 tonnes of carbon dioxide per capita by the year 2007, which commenced on 1 January 2003.

The Scheme imposed obligations on NSW electricity retailers and certain other parties, including large electricity users who elected to manage their own benchmark to abate a portion of the greenhouse gas emissions attributable to their sales/consumption of electricity in NSW. They did this by purchasing and acquitting NSW Greenhouse Abatement Certificates (also known as NGACs), a type of carbon credit, created by accredited "Abatement Certificate Providers" (ACPs). A 2007 analysis of the NGAC registry by researchers at the UNSW Centre for Energy and Environmental Markets examined the sources of registered certificates and their estimated impact on actual NSW electricity-sector emissions, identifying a number of unresolved design and governance issues.

The NSW Minister for Energy, Chris Hartcher, announced closure of the scheme in April 2012, effective from 30 June 2012. The Greenhouse Gas Reduction Scheme (GGAS) closed on 30 June 2012. The NSW Government closed GGAS to avoid duplication with the Commonwealth's carbon price which commenced on 1 July 2012.

== See also ==
- Jack's Gully
- WSN Environmental Solutions
