= WSN (disambiguation) =

WSN or Wireless sensor network, are spatially distributed autonomous sensors that monitor physical or environmental conditions and pass their data through the network to a main location.

WSN may also refer to:

- WSN Environmental Solutions, an Australian waste disposal company
- South Naknek Airport, Alaska (IATA airport code)
- Washington Square News, the daily student newspaper of New York University
- White sponge nevus, an autosomal dominant skin condition
- Willison railway station, Melbourne
- Wirth syntax notation, a metasyntax, or formal way to describe formal languages
- World Sports Network (WSN.com), a sports betting website run by Gaming Innovation Group
