= Camden South =

- Suburb
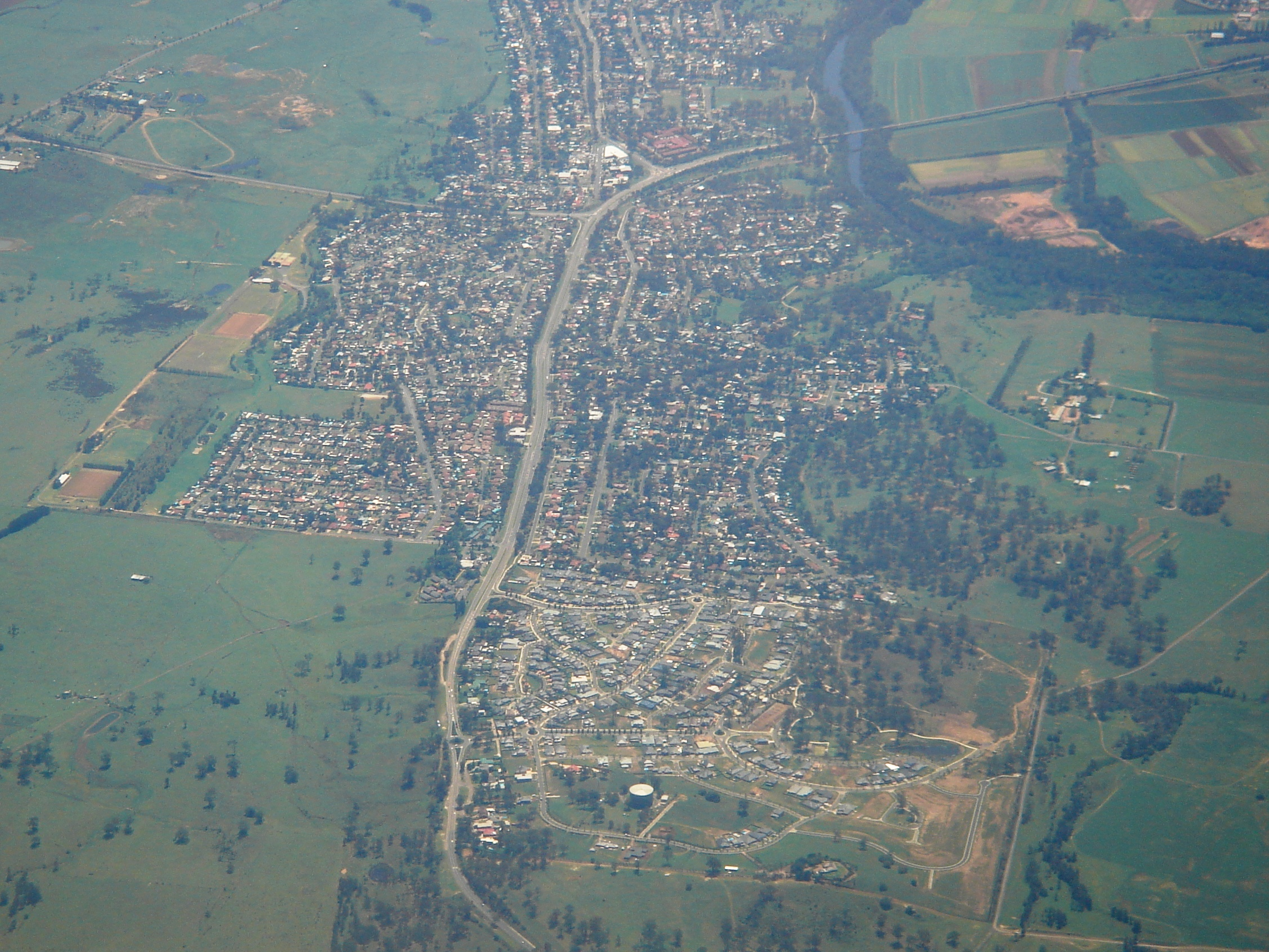
- Aerial view of the suburb Camden South. Camden is towards the top of the picture, Remembrance Driveway is through the middle and the Nepean River is in the top right.

- Interactive map of Camden South
- Country: Australia
- State: New South Wales
- City: Sydney
- LGA: Camden Council
- Location: 70 km (43 mi) SW of Sydney CBD

Government
  - State electorate: Camden
  - Federal division: Hume
- Elevation: 86 m (282 ft)

Population
  - Total: 4,595 (2021 census)
- Postcode: 2570
Suburbs around Camden South
Cawdor	Camden	Elderslie
Cawdor	Camden South	Spring Farm
Cawdor	Camden Park	Camden Park

Camden South is a suburb of the Macarthur Region of Sydney in the state of New South Wales, Australia in Camden Council. It is to the immediate south of Camden, New South Wales and shares the same postcode 2570.

== History ==
The area now known as Camden South was originally home to the Muringong, the southernmost of the Darug people, and the Gandangara people of the Southern Highlands. In 1805, wool pioneer John Macarthur was granted 5,000 acres (20 km^{2}) at Cowpastures (now Camden). After the land was cleared, it was used for farming for most of the next 200 years until Sydney's suburban sprawl reached the town of Camden and modern suburbs like Camden South were subdivided into housing blocks.

== Heritage listings ==
Camden South has a number of heritage-listed sites, including:

- Elizabeth Macarthur Avenue: Camden Park Estate and Belgenny Farm

== People ==
=== Demographics ===
According to the 2021 census of Population, there were 4,595 people in Camden South.

- Aboriginal and Torres Strait Islander people made up 3.9% of the population.
- 85.5% of people were born in Australia. The next most common country of birth was England at 4.1%.
- 92.9% of people only spoke English at home.
- The most common responses for religion were No Religion 32.3%, Catholic 27.4% and Anglican 23.2%.

== Politics ==
Camden South lies in the south ward of Camden Council, currently represented by Eva Campbell, Damien Quinnell and Rose Sicari. It sits within the state electorate of Camden, represented by Labor's Sally Quinnell, the former music teacher, and the federal electorate of Hume, represented by Liberal's Angus Taylor, the former businessman.
