= Spring Farm Advanced Resource Recovery Facility =

Recycling centre in New South Wales, Australia

Coordinates: 34.072937°S 150.744210°E

Spring Farm Advanced Resource Recovery Facility (or Spring Farm ARR Facility, formerly Macarthur Resource Recovery Park, and originally Jacks Gully Waste and Recycling Centre) is a Resource Recovery Facility, Materials Recycling Facility, and landfill located in Spring Farm, New South Wales, Australia.

Spring Farm ARR Facility currently takes 115,000 to 130,000 tonnes of waste from more than 104,000 households per annum from Camden, Campbelltown, Wollondilly and Wingecarribee councils plus a portion from Liverpool. Plus an additional 10,000 tonnes per annum of commercial and industrial waste.

== History ==
Jacks Gully landfill was initially handed over to the State from the local authority in 1973 as the existing council landfill at Springs Road became full. Jacks Gully landfill is owned by WSN Environmental Solutions.

After major redevelopment of the Jacks Gully landfill it was transformed into an Ecolibrium Mixed Waste Facility under a 15-year contract recently awarded to WSN Environmental Solutions. This development featured an ArrowBio mechanical biological treatment system, in-vessel composting and a visitor's centre. However this was decommissioned in February 2011 because of an odour footprint. The facility was acquired by SUEZ and renamed to Spring Farm Advanced Resource Recovery Facility.

== Regulatory history ==
In July 2020, the NSW Environment Protection Authority fined operator Suez Recycling and Recovery $15,000 after inspectors found processed glass and baled paper waste stored outside the facility building in breach of licence conditions, creating a fire, litter and water-pollution risk.

== See also ==
- New South Wales Greenhouse Gas Abatement Scheme
