= Douglas Park railway station =

Railway station in New South Wales, Australia

Douglas Park
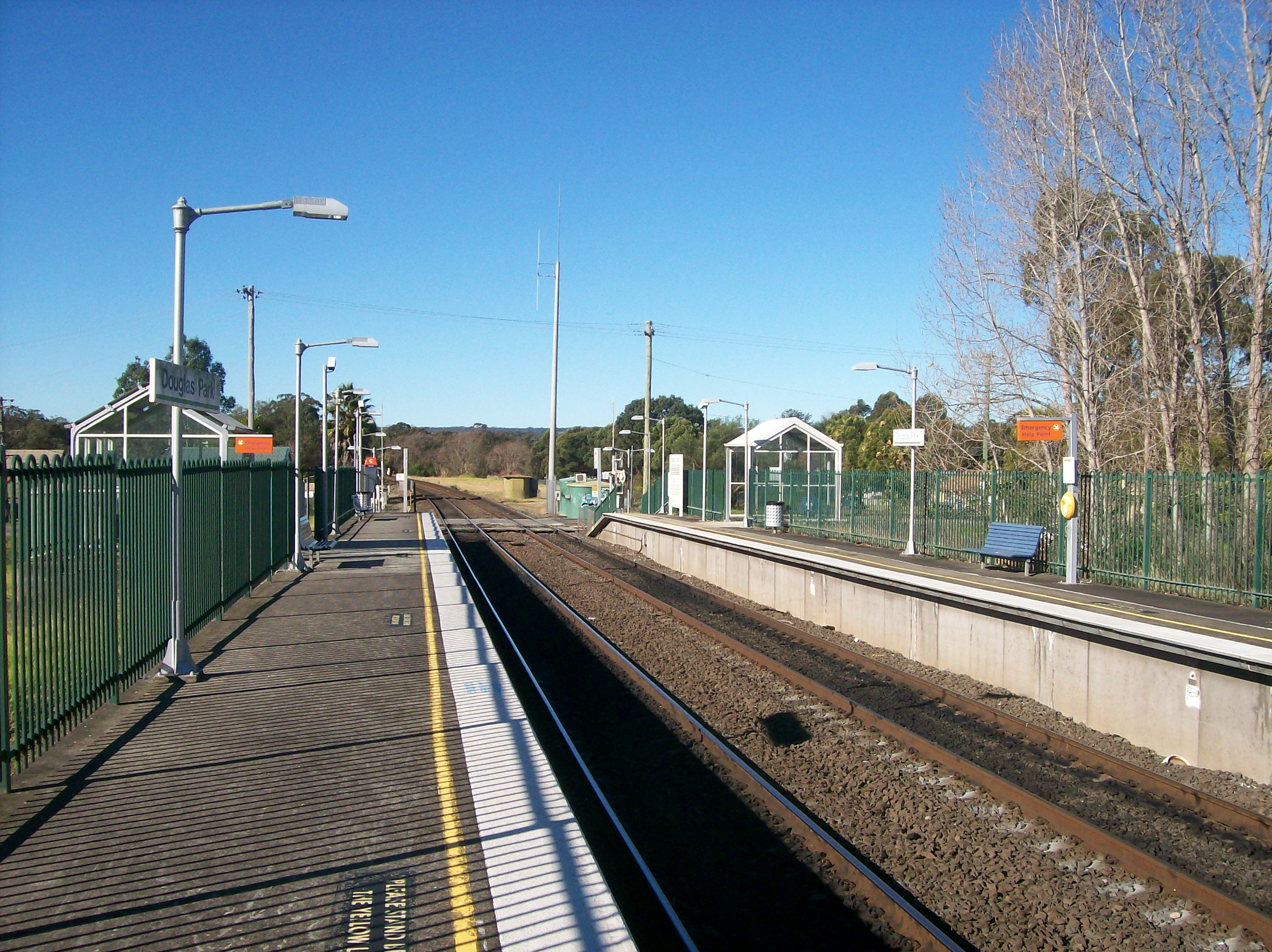
- Northbound view from Platform 1, June 2012

General information
- Location: Camden Road, Douglas Park; Australia
- Coordinates: 34°11′00″S 150°42′36″E
- Elevation: 124 metres (407 ft)
- Owner: Transport Asset Manager of New South Wales
- Operator: Sydney Trains
- Line: Main Southern
- Distance: 73.32 kilometres (45.56 mi) from Central
- Platforms: 2 side
- Tracks: 2

Construction
- Structure type: Ground

Other information
- Station code: DPK
- Website: Transport for NSW

History
- Opened: 6 September 1869
- Former names: Douglass Park (1863–1891)

Passengers
- 2025: 10,217 (year); 28 (daily) (Sydney Trains, NSW TrainLink)

Services
Preceding station	Intercity Trains	Following station
Picton towards Moss Vale or Goulburn	Southern Highlands Line	Menangle towards Campbelltown or Central
Location

Douglas Park railway station is located on the Main Southern line in New South Wales, Australia. It serves the town of Douglas Park, opening on 1 July 1863 with the opening of the Menangle to Picton railway extension, the station was originally a halt where trains would stop by signal only.

The station first appeared as Douglass Park in the Great Southern Railway timetable on 29 June 1863, as a footnote indicating that trains would stop at the station if required. It received up to 3 Up trains and 3 Down trains during weekdays. The journey time to Campbelltown was approximately 30–35 minutes, and to Sydney; approximately 2 hours (depending on wait times at Campbelltown).

The station was renamed Douglas Park on 31 July 1891. It was relocated to its present site on 13 June 1892.

== Platforms and services ==
Douglas Park has two side platforms. It is serviced by Sydney Trains Southern Highlands Line services travelling between Campbelltown and Moss Vale with 2 weekend morning services to Sydney Central and limited evening services to Goulburn.

Platform	Line	Stopping pattern	Notes
1	SHL	services to Campbelltown; 2 weekend morning services to Sydney Central	
2	SHL	services to Moss Vale evening services to Goulburn (2 weekday, 1 weekend)	
