= Menangle railway station =

Railway station in New South Wales, Australia

Menangle
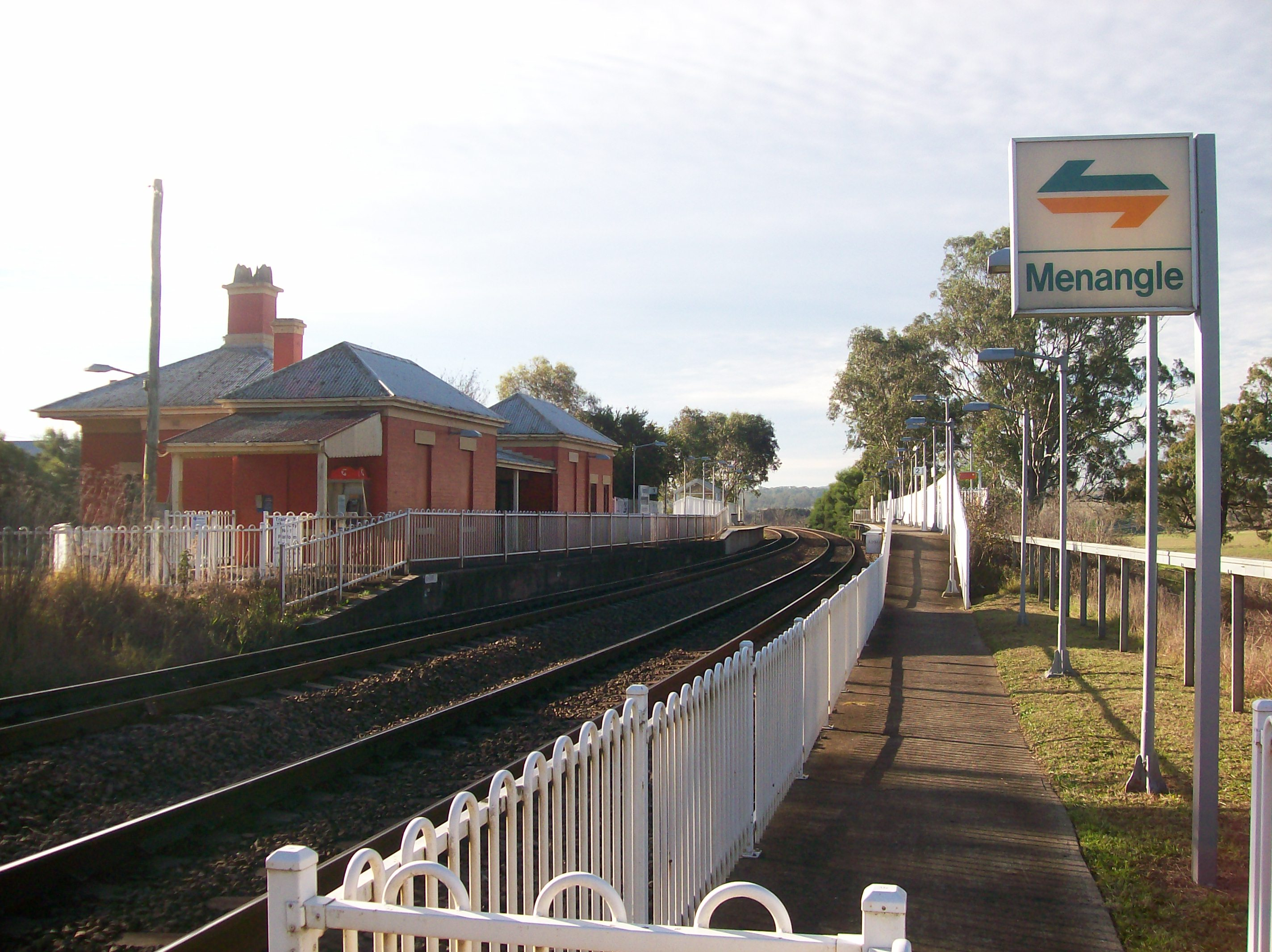
- Northbound view of station platforms, January 2006

General information
- Location: Station Street, Menangle; Australia
- Coordinates: 34°07′31″S 150°44′40″E
- Elevation: 84 metres (276 ft)
- Owner: Transport Asset Manager of New South Wales
- Operator: Sydney Trains
- Line: Main Southern
- Distance: 65.33 kilometres (40.59 mi) from Central
- Platforms: 2 side
- Tracks: 2
- Connections: Bus

Construction
- Structure type: Ground

Other information
- Station code: MGE
- Website: Transport for NSW

History
- Opened: 1 July 1863

Passengers
- 2025: 7,859 (year); 22 (daily) (Sydney Trains, NSW TrainLink)

Services
Preceding station	Intercity Trains	Following station
Douglas Park towards Moss Vale or Goulburn	Southern Highlands Line	Menangle Park towards Campbelltown or Central

New South Wales Heritage Register
- Official name: Menangle Railway Station group
- Type: State heritage (complex / group)
- Designated: 2 April 1999
- Reference no.: 1191
- Type: Railway Platform / Station
- Category: Transport – Rail
Location

Menangle railway station is a heritage-listed railway station located on the Main Southern line in the south-western Sydney settlement of Menangle, in the Wollondilly Shire local government area of New South Wales, Australia. The station opened on 1 July 1863. The property was added to the New South Wales State Heritage Register on 2 April 1999.

== Platforms and services ==
Menangle has two side platforms and is served by Sydney Trains Southern Highlands Line trains travelling between Campbelltown and Moss Vale, with two weekend morning services to Sydney Central and limited evening services to Goulburn.

Platform	Line	Stopping pattern	Notes
1	SHL	services to Campbelltown; 2 weekend morning services to Sydney Central	
2	SHL	services to Moss Vale evening services to Goulburn (2 weekday, 1 weekend)	

== Description ==
The station complex comprises a Type 1 station building and residence, erected in 1863. The original single brick-faced platform is now on the Sydney-bound track. A brick WC block, also erected in 1863, was removed pre-2000.

== Transport links ==
Transit Systems operates two bus routes via Menangle station, under contract to Transport for NSW:

- 49: to Camden
- 889: to Campbelltown station

== Heritage listing ==
Menangle station group is one of the earliest station complexes to survive in the state. It is a combination station building and residence which has had substantial additions. Although the second platform and building have been demolished for a new platform the remaining up buildings and platform are of very high significance in the development of railway buildings. Significant features of this building are its lack of awning to the platform, the unusual planning of the building with detached wings, room for porters, no waiting room and the asymmetrical elevations. The remaining structures are of national significance in conjunction with the railway underbridge listed separately.

Menangle railway station was listed on the New South Wales State Heritage Register on 2 April 1999 having satisfied the following criteria.

The place possesses uncommon, rare or endangered aspects of the cultural or natural history of New South Wales.

This item is assessed as historically rare. This item is assessed as scientifically rare. This item is assessed as arch. rare. This item is assessed as socially rare.

== See also ==
- List of regional railway stations in New South Wales
