= Spring Farm =

- Suburb
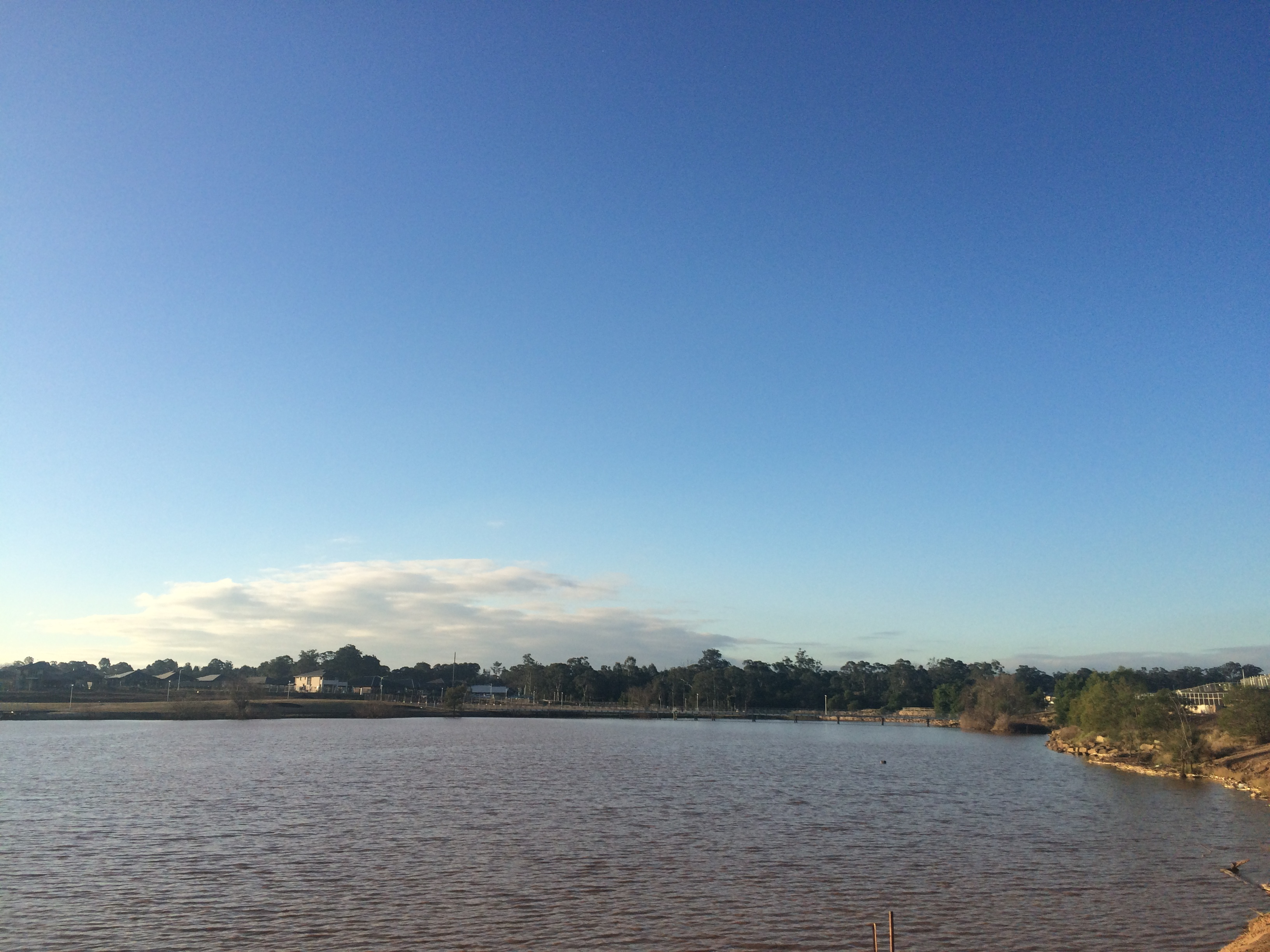
- Springs Lake in Spring Farm

- Interactive map of Spring Farm
- Country: Australia
- State: New South Wales
- Region: Macarthur
- City: Sydney
- LGA: Camden Council
- Location: 64 km (40 mi) SW of Sydney CBD

Government
  - State electorate: Camden
  - Federal division: Hume
- Elevation: 94 m (308 ft)

Population
  - Total: 9,868 (2021 census)
- Postcode: 2570
Suburbs around Spring Farm
Elderslie	Narellan	Narellan Vale
Camden	Spring Farm	Mount Annan
Camden South	Camden Park	Menangle Park

Spring Farm is a suburb of the Macarthur Region of Sydney in the state of New South Wales, Australia in Camden Council. It is on the east side of the Nepean River. Until recently, it was mainly farmland with a winery, an electricity substation and the Spring Farm Advanced Resource Recovery Facility, but it is currently in the process of suburban redevelopment.

== History ==
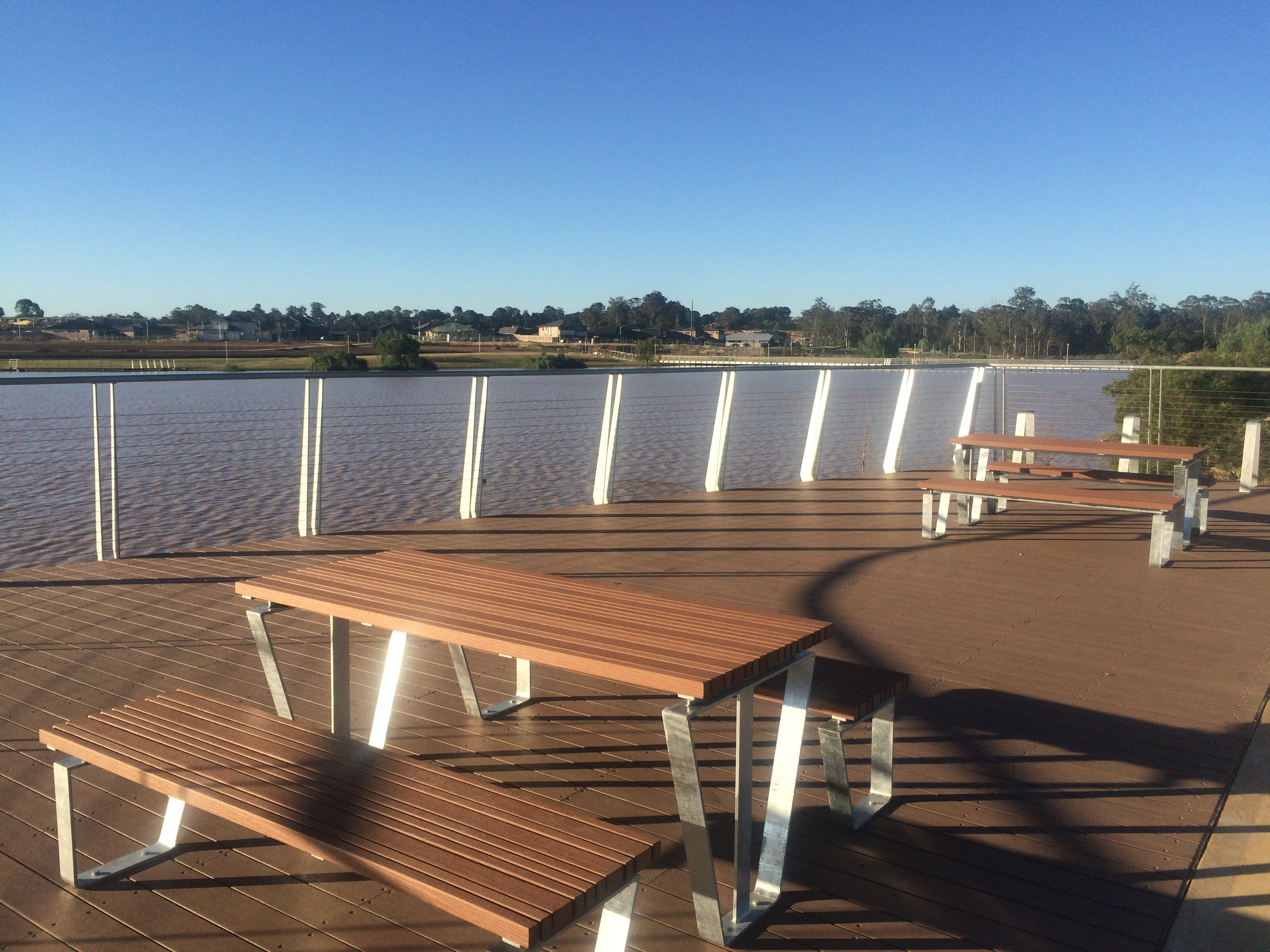
Springs Lake South Boardwalk

The area now known as Spring Farm was probably originally home to the Tharawal people, based in the Illawarra region, although the Western Sydney-based Darug people and the Southern Highlands-based Gandangara people were also known to have inhabited the greater Camden area. Very early relations with British settlers were cordial but as farmers started clearing and fencing the land affecting food resources in the area, clashes between the groups arose until 1816 when a number of indigenous people were massacred and the remainder retreated from direct conflict with the settlers.

In 1805, wool pioneer John Macarthur, was granted 5,000 acres (20 km^{2}) at Cowpastures. After the land was cleared, it was used for farming for most of the next 200 years until Sydney's suburban sprawl reached the town of Camden and the farmland was subdivided into housing blocks.

== Transport ==
Spring Farm is off the Camden Bypass. There are a number of bus services operated by Transit Systems that run through the suburb. The nearest railway station is Macarthur.

== Landmarks ==
=== Springs Lake ===
Springs Lake is a man made lake in Spring Farm with a timber boardwalk, and picnic facilities.

=== Spring Farm Dog Park ===
Spring Farm Dog Park opened in July 2016 and can be located next to Springs Lake near Burrell Road.

== Governance ==
Spring Farm lies in the south ward of Camden Council, currently represented by Eva Campbell, Damien Quinnell and Rose Sicari. The suburb is contained within the federal electorate of Division of Hume, represented by Angus Taylor (Liberal), and the state electorate of Camden, currently held by Sally Quinnell, New South Wales Labor Party.

== Education ==
There is one public school in the area. Spring Farm Public School was built in 2016 and is located on Barley Road.

== Facilities ==
The Spring Farm Resource Recovery Park in the suburb processes household waste from the Campbelltown City Council, Camden Council, Wollondilly Shire Council and Wingecarribee Shire Council areas. The site includes a materials recycling facility (MRF) for sorting kerbside recyclables and recovering reusable materials. General waste and garden organics are temporarily stored before being transferred to landfill and commercial composting facilities, respectively.
