= Douglas Park, New South Wales =

Douglas Park
- Suburb
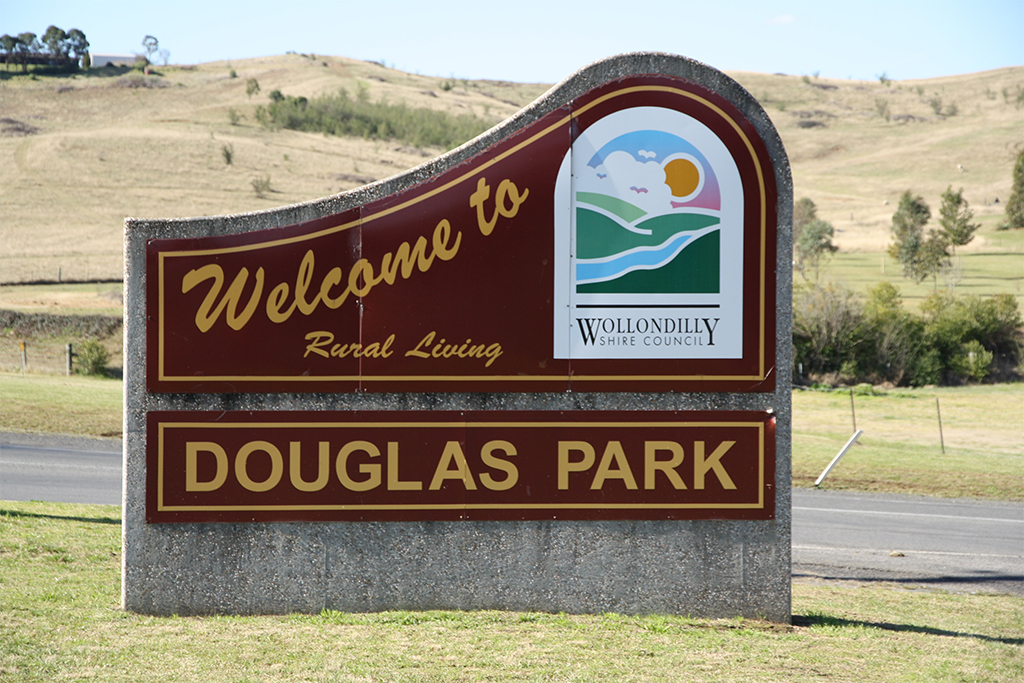

- Coordinates: 34°11′S 150°43′E
- Country: Australia
- State: New South Wales
- LGA: Wollondilly
- Location: 76.5 km (47.5 mi) from Sydney CBD; 47 km (29 mi) from Mittagong

Government
  - Federal division: Macarthur, Hume
- Elevation: 123 m (404 ft)

Population
  - Total: 1,362 (2016 census)
- Postcode: 2569
Suburbs around Douglas Park
| Menangle | Menangle | Appin |
| Razorback | Douglas Park | Appin |
| Maldon | Wilton | Appin |

Douglas Park is a town of the Macarthur Region in New South Wales, Australia in Wollondilly Shire. It is near the Hume Highway, the F5 Freeway and on the Main Southern railway line. Its station is served by NSW TrainLink's Southern Highlands Line. It is about 80 km southwest of Sydney. In 2016, Douglas Park had a population of 1,362.

== History ==
The area is in the lands of the Gandangara people and the Tharawal people. The first European settlement was named Hoare Town. The area is named thus on a map made by Surveyor General Sir Thomas Mitchell, in 1865. The two largest land grants in the district were those of Dr Henry Grattan Douglass and Jean Baptiste de Arrietta. Douglass in time gave his name to the town, the final "s" of his name being lost due to a cartographer's error; de Arrietta is remembered by the locality "Spaniard's Hill", lying to the north of the town.

Douglass had numbers of convicts working on his farm, as muster rolls in the State Records of NSW show. This farm may, however, have belonged to, or been managed by, Douglass' son.

The railway reached Douglas Park in 1863 as a station on the extension of the Main South Line from Campbelltown to Picton.

In 1889, writer Ethel Turner, at the age of 17, visited the area:

6th April: Went to Newington Sports. Took cab to the grounds. The Sports were very poor.

I walked with Mr Curlewis a little and after with Mr Curnow. We left Annie, then Lil and I hurried off and caught the 5 o'clock train to Picton to stay with the Daintreys.

10th April: Mr Daintrey took us all in a buggy to Douglas Park for a picnic. It was a fearfully long drive but very pleasant there, we went mushroom hunting. Afternoon we went to the Show. It is the first country show I have been to. We had tea on the grounds with the Abbotsford Antills and a lot more people.

== Population ==
In the 2016 Census, there were 1,362 people in Douglas Park. 81.0% of people were born in Australia and 89.3% of people spoke only English at home. The most common responses for religion were Catholic 32.7%, Anglican 28.7% and No Religion 17.0%.

== Religious organisations ==
The Church of the Sacred Heart began as the town’s community hall, which was built in 1937, and consecrated as a Catholic church two years later. It is located on the south side of the railway station, and is now known as the 'Catholic Community Hall'.

Douglas Park is home to a Catholic religious community known as the Missionaries of the Sacred Heart, at Saint Mary's Towers in Douglas Park Drive. The community includes an historic sandstone house that was once the home of famous New South Wales surveyor Sir Thomas Mitchell. The house, first known as Park Hall, was completed in 1845. The Saint Mary's Towers Retreat Centre is also located here, utilising the historic novitiate and junior seminary buildings, and the local Catholic community of Douglas Park and Wilton is based here and uses the historic, timber Sacred Heart Church for their liturgical celebrations. The Missionaries of the Sacred Heart have lived in community here since 1904, and so "the Towers" - as it is affectionately known - has been the focus of the local Catholic (and wider) community for more than 100 years.

The Douglas Park Evangelical Church meets each Sunday at 10:00am in the Community Hall. It has met here for over 14 years. It has members from all walks of life and towns around the Wollondilly area. Many activities are carried out throughout the week including bible studies and playgroup.

== Community facilities ==
Douglas Park has a General Store which includes a Post Office. Adjacent is a service station and also a café. There is no Police Station: Douglas Park is part of the Camden Local Area Command.

Douglas Park Sports Ground is home to The Douglas Park-Wilton Razorbacks Soccer Football Club in the winter and in the summer season Douglas Park Little Athletics Club, and soon-to-be Douglas Park Cricket Club. There are two tennis courts at the sports ground.

The Spaniard's Hill Catholic community had a Parish School in 1860. Douglas Park Public School opened in 1883. Buses and trains now carry the town's secondary students to high schools in the Wollondilly Shire and beyond. A Long Day Care service is available, a playgroup, and a rural mobile pre-school.

The Progress Hall, built by the Douglas Park Progress Association is located on the north-west corner of the sports ground.

Douglas Park Rural Fire Service shed is also located at the sports ground.

== Natural heritage ==
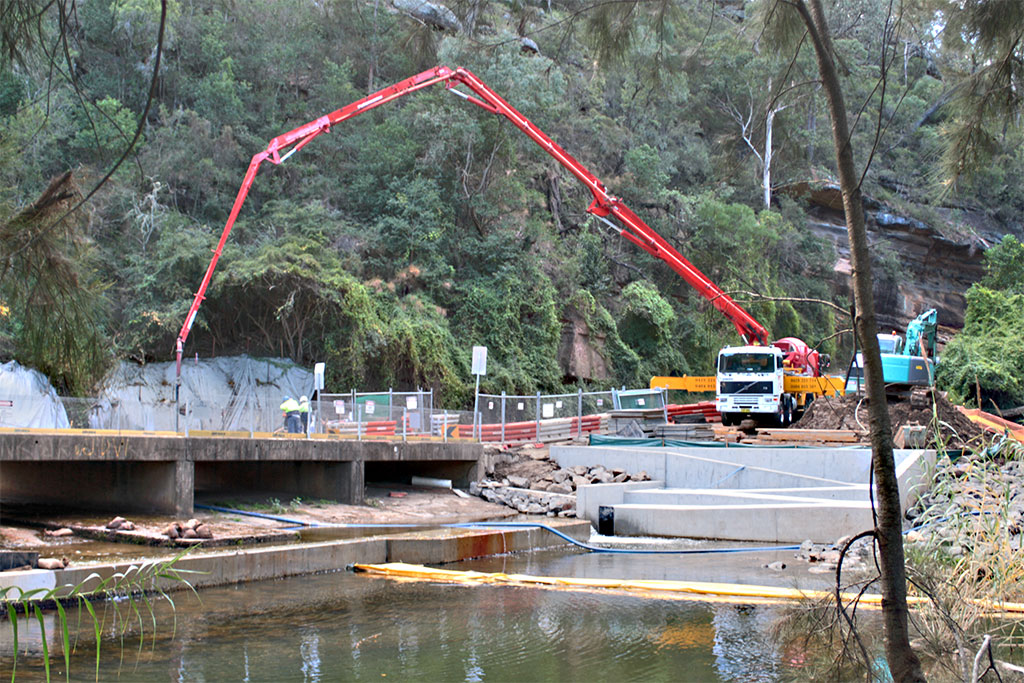
Construction work on causeway, May 2010

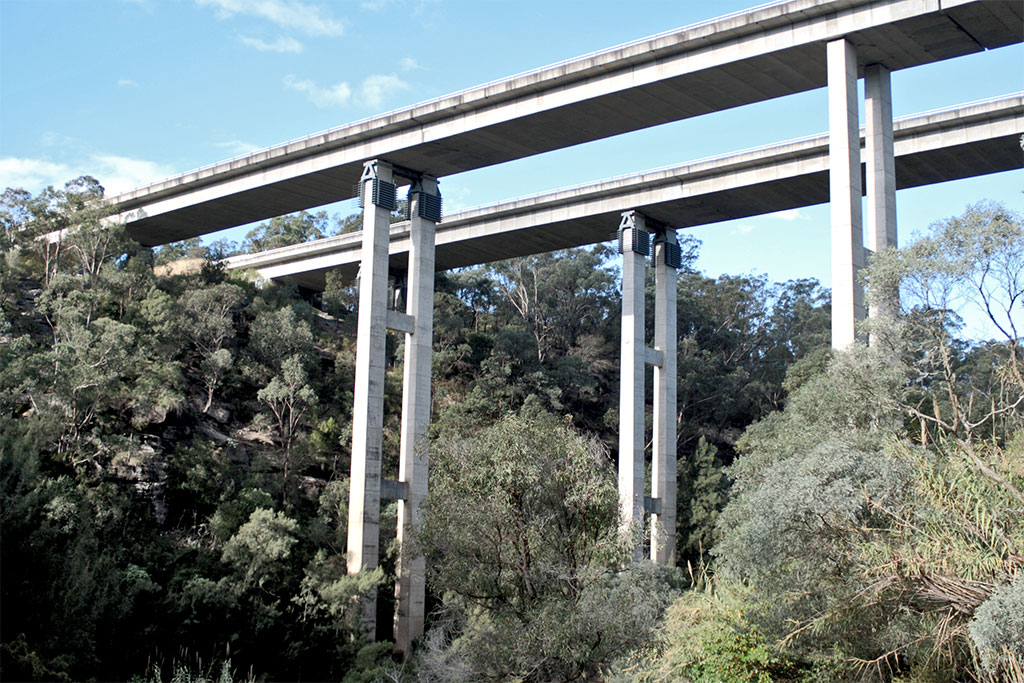
Douglas Park twin bridges on F5 Freeway

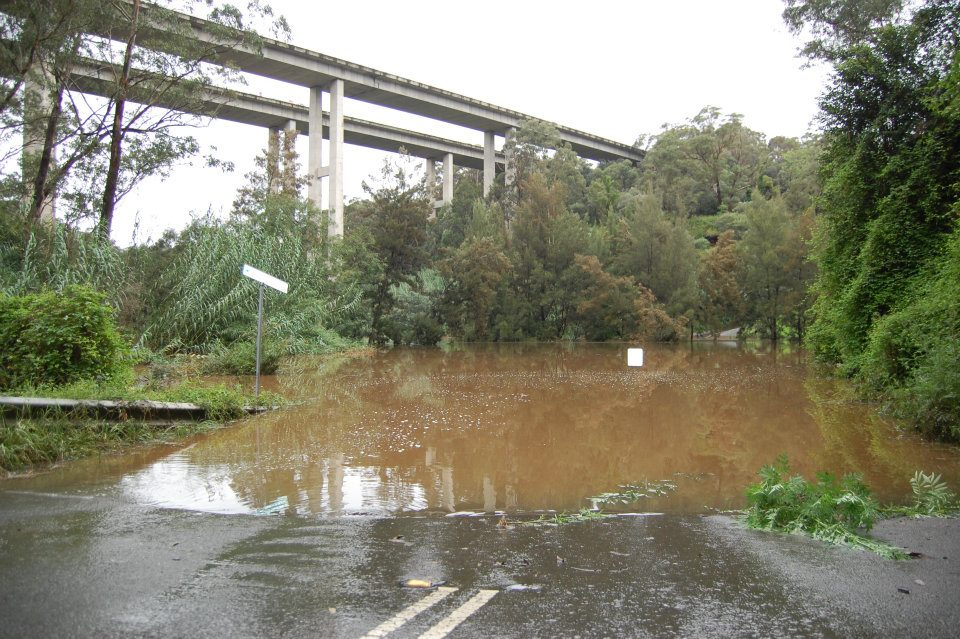
Douglas Park Bridge flooding after heavy rain

Douglas Park is surrounded by low hills, pasture, and bushland. To the south of the town, the Nepean River runs through a rocky gorge. The causeway crossing the river on Douglas Park Drive is a popular swimming and canoeing site for residents, and others from surrounding districts. Many buildings in the area are used for kindergarten schools or pre-schools. One is located near the soccer ground in which the Douglas Park Razorbacks train and play.

The weir at this location was modified in 2010, having been identified as a major barrier to fish migration. A vertical slot fishway was installed as part of Sydney Catchment Authority's Weirs Project.

Downstream from this spot was once a suspension road bridge, of a similar design to the Maldon Suspension Bridge, upstream on the Nepean River.

At this location also are the Douglas Park twin bridges, carrying northbound and southbound lanes of the F5 Freeway over the Nepean River. This bridge was opened in 1980, as part of the extension of the Hume Highway from Campbelltown to Yanderra. In 2007, Douglas Park residents expressed concern that coal-mining in the area would cause the collapse of either or both of these bridges, possibly resulting in many deaths.
