= Camden Park, New South Wales =

Camden Park
- Suburb
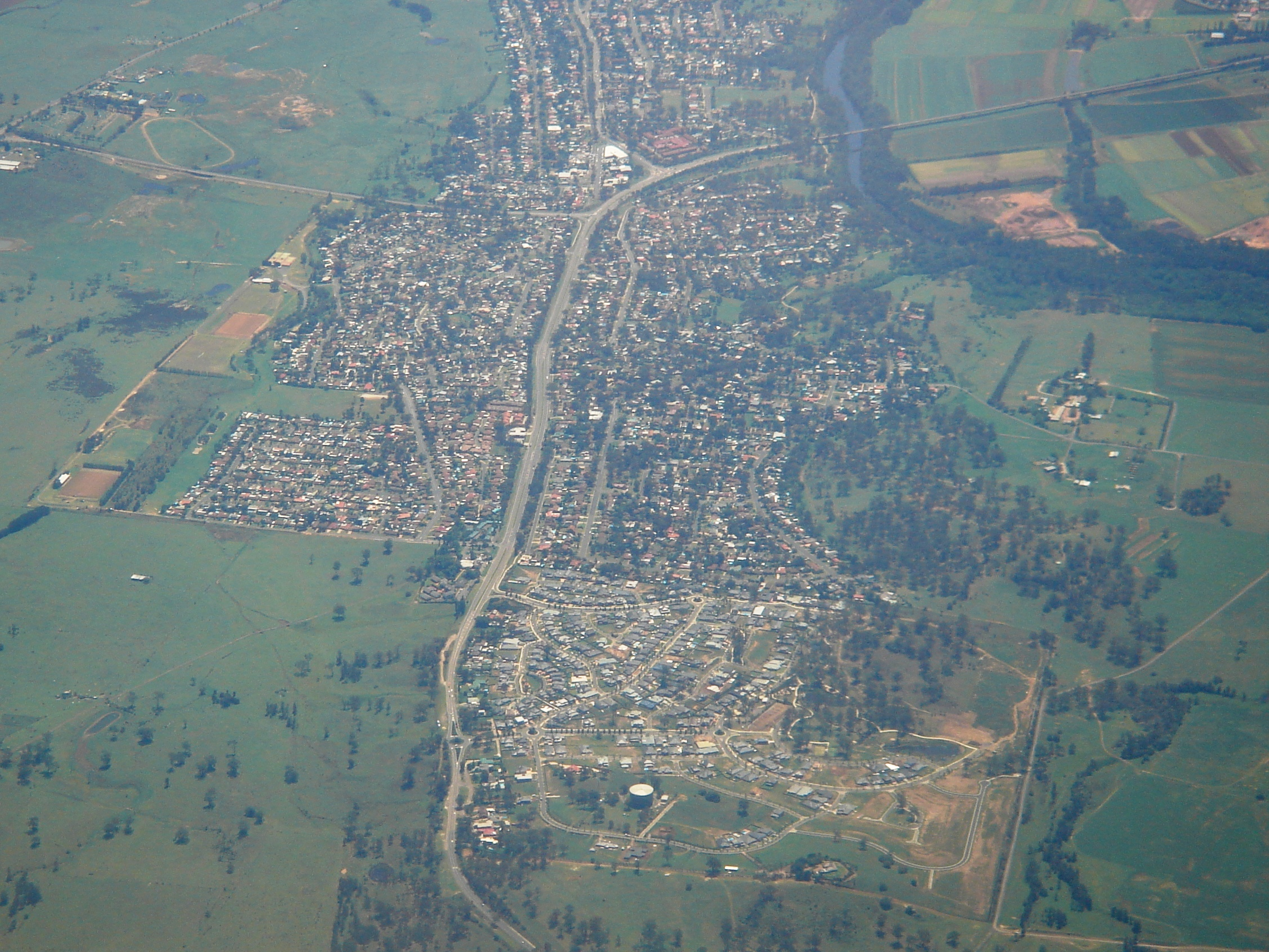
- New development at Camden Park (bottom of picture) just south of Camden South.

- Interactive map of Camden Park
- Coordinates: 34°05′25″S 150°43′04″E
- Country: Australia
- State: New South Wales
- City: Sydney
- LGA: Wollondilly Shire
- Location: 73 km (45 mi) SE of Sydney CBD; 58 km (36 mi) NE of Mittagong

Government
  - State electorate: Camden
  - Federal division: Hume
- Elevation: 73 m (240 ft)

Population
  - Total: 2,238 (2016 census)
- Postcode: 2570
Suburbs around Camden Park
Camden South	Spring Farm	Mount Annan
Cawdor	Camden Park	Menangle Park
Cawdor	Menangle	Menangle

Camden Park is a suburb in Sydney in New South Wales, Australia. It was named after John Macarthur's estate Camden Park. While most of the suburb is farmland in Wollondilly Shire, the northern part of Camden Park has recently undergone suburban development as an extension of the suburb of Camden South. Camden South is in the Camden Council area and is part of Greater Sydney. The new development is named Bridgewater Estate and features a comprehensive Development Control Plan to guide the style outcomes of the locality.

== Population ==
In the 2016 Census, there were 2,238 people in Camden Park. 86.3% of people were born in Australia and 92.9% of people spoke only English at home. The most common responses for religion were Catholic 38.9%, Anglican 27.6% and No Religion 16.9%.

== Heritage listings ==
Camden Park has a number of heritage-listed sites, including:

- Elizabeth Macarthur Avenue: Camden Park Estate
