= Menangle Park =

- Suburb
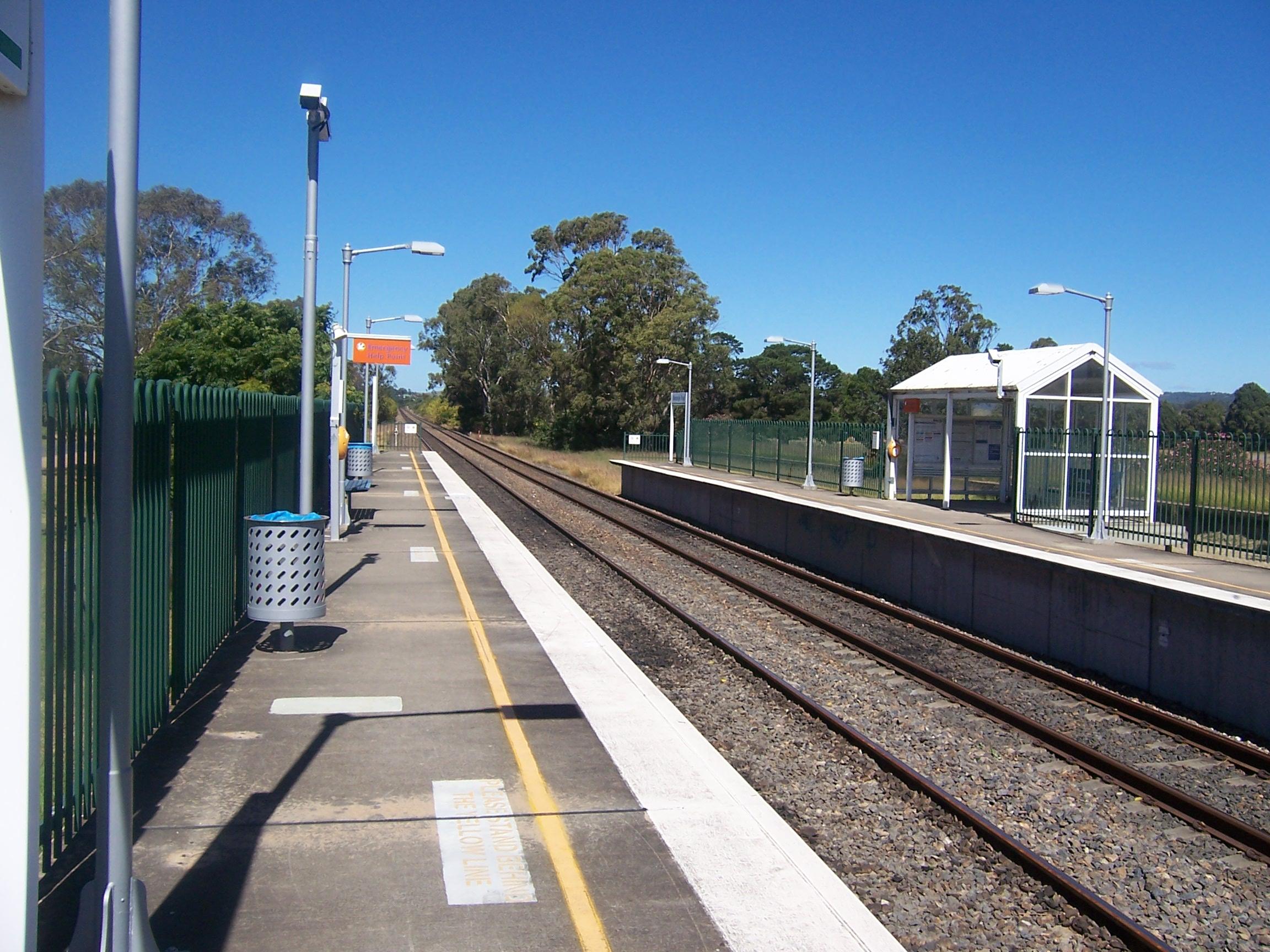
- Menangle Park station

- Interactive map of Menangle Park
- Country: Australia
- State: New South Wales
- City: Sydney
- LGA: City of Campbelltown
- Location: 67 km (42 mi) south-west of Sydney CBD; 55 km (34 mi) north-east of Mittagong

Government
  - State electorate: Campbelltown
  - Federal division: Macarthur
- Elevation: 79 m (259 ft)

Population
  - Total: 224 (2021 census)
- Postcode: 2563
Suburbs around Menangle Park
| Spring Farm | Mount Annan | Glen Alpine |
| Camden Park | Menangle Park | Gilead |
| Menangle | Menangle | Gilead |

Menangle Park is a suburb in Sydney in the state of New South Wales, Australia. Menangle Park is located 56 kilometres south-west of the Sydney central business district, in the local government area of the City of Campbelltown. Menangle Park is a largely rural area and is part of the Macarthur region.

== Demographics ==
According to the 2021 census, Menangle Park had a population of 224 people, who are mostly Australian born. The area has a particularly high number of people from the Anglican church (26.3%), nearly triple the proportion of Anglicans nationwide (9.8%). The median personal income of $792 per week is lower than the national average ($805).

== History ==
Menangle Park was originally home to the Tharawal people, and it was they who gave the name, transcribed as Manangle or Manhangle, to a small lagoon on the west bank of the Nepean River. The river was important to the Tharawal both for its consistent water supply as well as the fish and yabbies that could be caught there.

When British settler Walter Davidson established a farm on the west side of the river in 1805, he named it Manangle after the lagoon. Another early settler Thomas Taber built Menangle House on the east side of the river, indicating the name was being used to describe the district. The Main South railway line came through in 1863 and stations were established on either side of the river but following a north–south line so that the station in what is now known as Menangle Park was initially called North Menangle.

With the establishment of the Menangle Park Racecourse in 1914, the suburb name became synonymous with the racecourse and only a few years later, the name was officially changed to Menangle Park. In 1920, the land to the east of the station was subdivided into 1-hectare (2.5-acre) lots to provide land for returned World War I servicemen. While there has been a push to open the area up for further subdivision since then, this has been resisted by the state government because of concern about the effects such development could have on the water quality of the Nepean.

== Heritage listings ==
Menangle Park has a number of heritage-listed sites, including:

- Glenlee Road: Glenlee, Menangle Park

=== Landmarks ===
Built in 1914, Menangle Park Paceway gave the suburb its name and is still its major landmark. Designed by local architect Alfred Payten, it lies on the river flats between the railway station and the Nepean River. In 1996, much of the Paceway activity was relocated to the newly upgraded Harold Park; it was then used mostly for training. In 2004–2007, the Paceway received a major upgrade, and was reopened for major racing events, with the intention of concentrating all such events there after the closing of Harold Park.

By the western side of the current railway station are the remains of the Menangle Racecourse Junction. This comprised three sidings, and provided a Passenger Platform and a Horse Loading Platform. The platforms can still be seen, and they are considerably longer than the current station platform.

To the north is an older landmark. Glenlee House was built by magistrate William Howe in 1824. It was purchased by the Macarthur Development Board in 1978 who restored it and opened it to the public.

== Present community ==
Menangle Park is effectively divided from the eastern neighbouring suburb of Gilead by the M31 Hume Motorway. On the eastern side of the motorway are Broughton Anglican College, established in 1986 in the premises of the former Mount Gilead Christian School, and The Campbelltown Steam and Machinery Museum. A Retirement Resort at Gilead has been planned for some years, but currently is not likely to proceed. All these give their address as Menangle Park.

In the village proper on the western side, there are a small General Store, and a Rural Fire Brigade Shed, as well as the Menangle House Tavern, built 1834. The Progress Hall has been destroyed.

== Menangle Park gallery ==
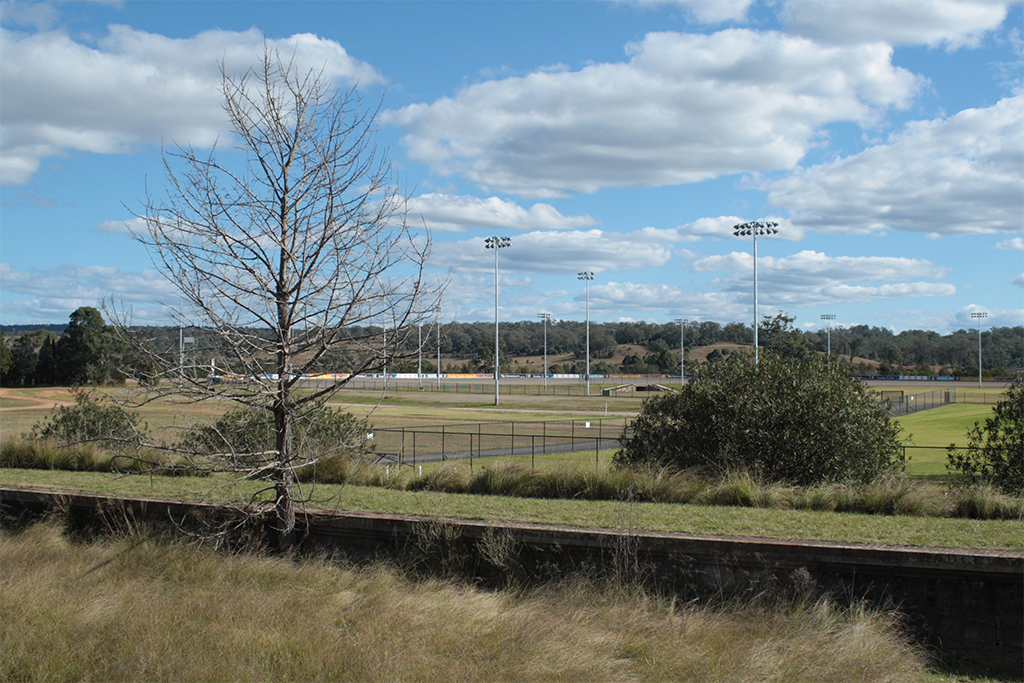
Disused railway platform

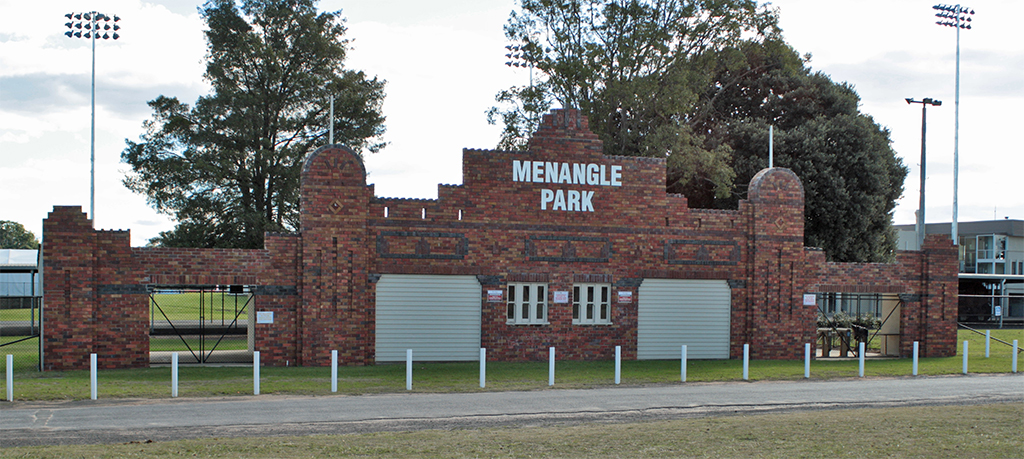
Entry to the Paceway

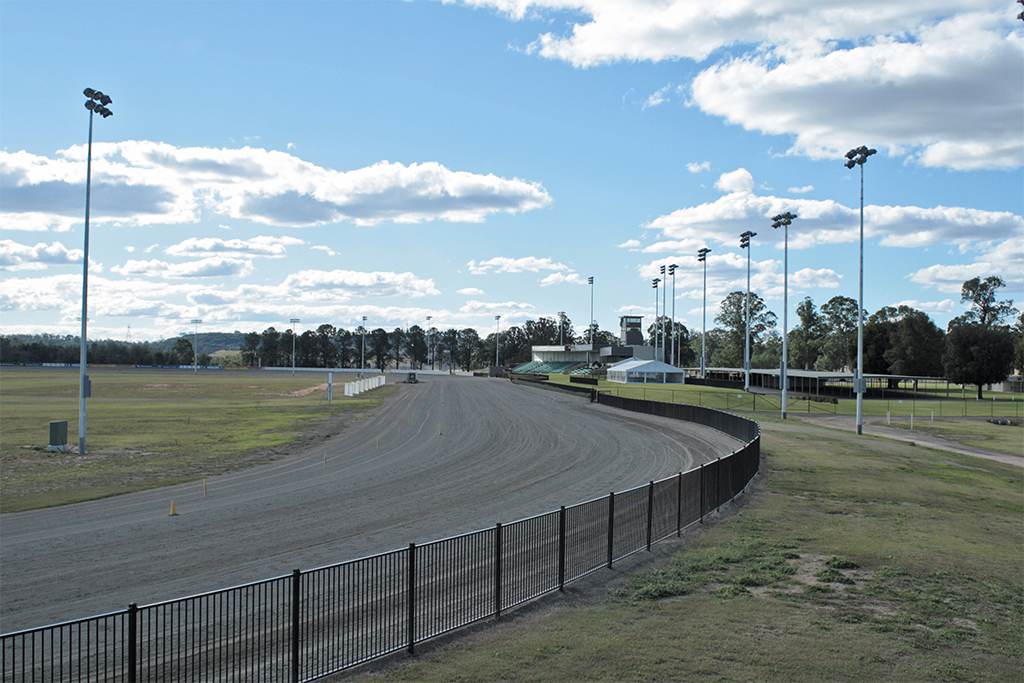
Track at Paceway

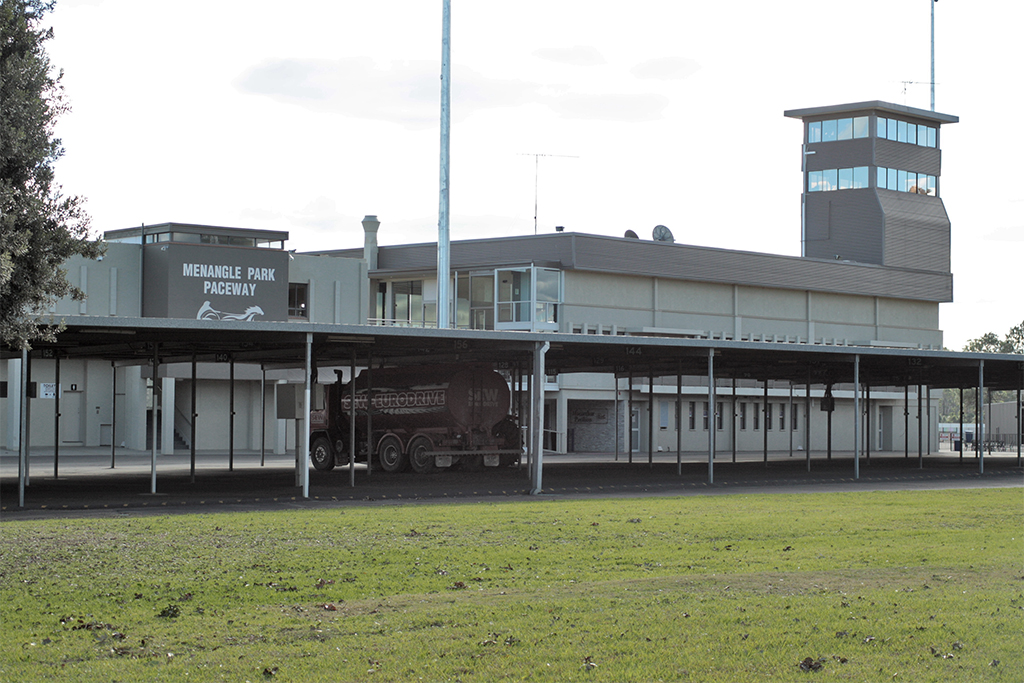
Paceway Pavilion

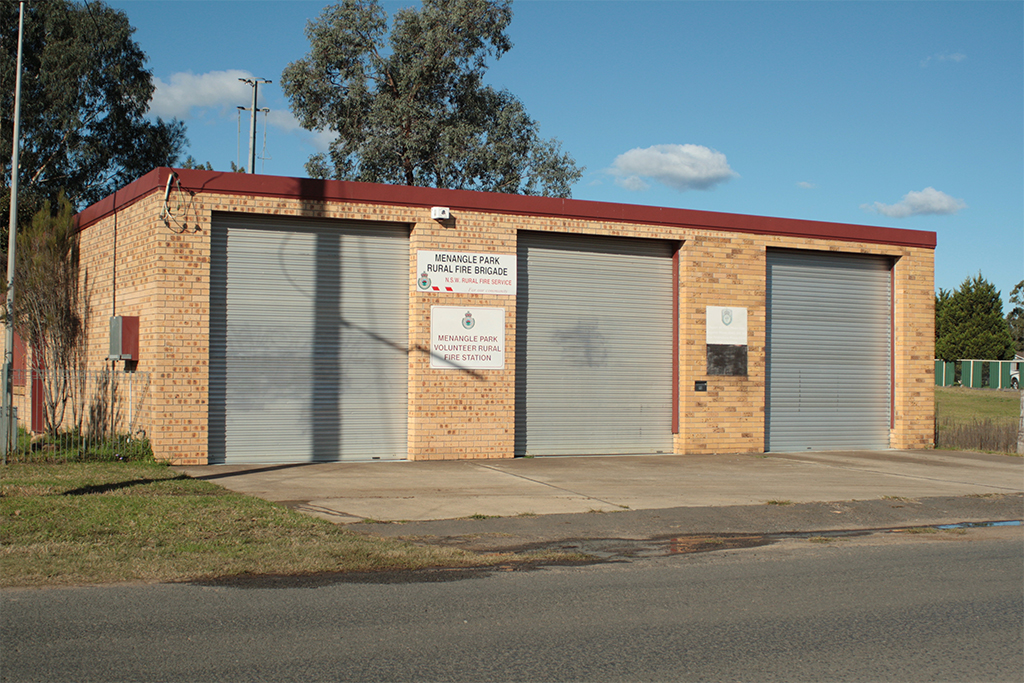
Rural fire brigade shed
