= WSN Environmental Solutions =

Former Australian waste disposal company

WSN Environmental Solutions was a major waste disposal company in New South Wales, Australia owned by the New South Wales Government. SITA Australia acquired WSN in February 2011 for $235AU million. The acquisition of WSN now makes SITA Australia's largest most advanced waste management network. WSN has a history of leading in the deployment of advanced waste treatment technologies, specifically mechanical biological treatment systems. WSN constructed the first UR-3R facility and has recently won a contract to develop Australia's first integrated waste management park at the Jacks Gully landfill, near Sydney.

WSN owns and operates 10 waste recycling, processing and disposal facilities.

== See also ==
- Jack's Gully landfill
- Mechanical biological treatment
