= Menangle, New South Wales =

Coordinates: 34°7′38.13″S 150°44′19.43″E

Menangle
- Suburb
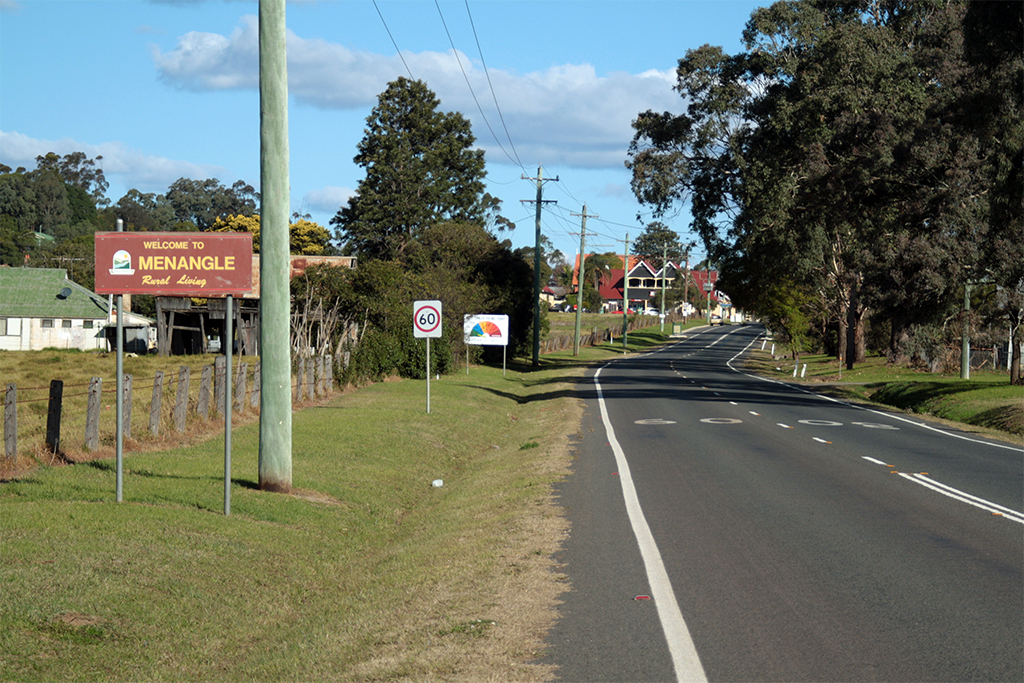
- Entrance to Menangle village
- Interactive map of Menangle
- Country: Australia
- State: New South Wales
- Region: Macarthur
- LGA: Wollondilly Shire
- Location: 69.5 km (43.2 mi) from Sydney CBD; 48 km (30 mi) from Mittagong

Government
  - State electorate: Wollondilly
  - Federal division: Hume
- Elevation: 86 m (282 ft)

Population
  - Total: 1,150 (2016 census)
- Postcode: 2568
Suburbs around Menangle
Camden Park	Menangle Park	Gilead
Cawdor	Menangle	Appin
Razorback	Douglas Park	Appin

Menangle is a village in the Macarthur region of New South Wales, Australia.

== Location ==
Menangle is part of the Wollondilly Shire. At the 2006 census, Menangle had a population of 875 people. At the 2016 census, Menangle's population had risen to 1,150.

== History ==
The town's name is derived from an Indigenous Australian word for 'a place of swamps and lagoons'.

In 1806, Walter Davidson named his land grant in this district "Manangle". This property was later incorporated into the larger Macarthur Estate and the village grew to service the operations of Camden Park Estate.

The opening of the railway in 1863 enabled overnight milk deliveries to the Sydney Market.

In connection with the construction of Sydney Harbour Bridge, a tramway was constructed between the railway station and a sand-mining area on the banks of the Nepean River. However, this tramway is not currently in service.

== Heritage listings ==
Menangle has a number of heritage-listed sites, including:

- Main Southern railway: Menangle railway station
- Main Southern railway: Nepean River railway bridge, Menangle

== Notable people ==
- Albert Stephen Stanner, was a Churchwarden from 1895 to 1924 at the St James Anglican church. One of the church's stained glass windows commemorates him.
- The Rubens, an Australian band and Triple J Hottest 100 finalist for 2012 & winners in 2015, comprising three brothers and one childhood friend, who all grew up in Menangle.
- James Tedesco, Sydney Roosters captain and fullback grew up in Menangle.
- Jessica Cronje, wheelchair basketball player.

== Menangle railway bridge ==
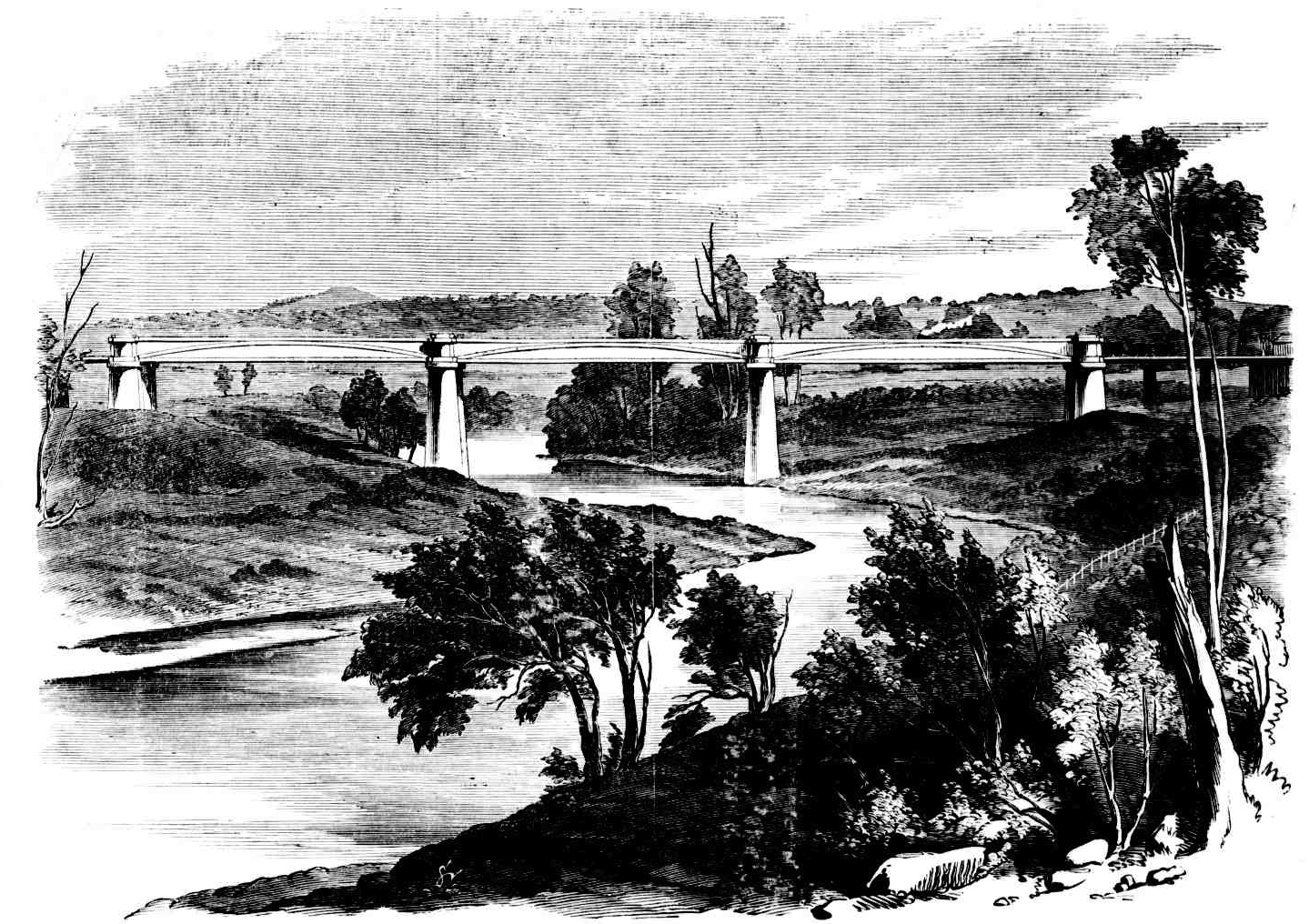
Menangle Railway Bridge in 1864 Illustrated Sydney News

The Menangle Railway Bridge is the oldest surviving rail bridge in New South Wales, and was built under the direction of John Whitton. The following description was published in 1864, at the time it was opened. The bridge carries the Main South Line over the Nepean River, linking Menangle Park and Menangle.

The Menangle tubular girder bridge was the largest engineering project constructed on the New South Wales railway network at the time of its completion, earning contemporary recognition for its design and execution.

It was at first intended that the bridge at Menangle should be of stone or brick piers, with wrought-iron girders; but in consequence of what was considered too high a price for the ironwork Mr Whitton recommended a change in the design and drawings were made for a timber bridge. The drawings were about being prepared, when, in February 1860, disastrous floods occurred, and the raising of the river five feet higher than it had ever before risen, necessitated the preparation of fresh designs in order to raise the bridge seven feet. Shortly afterwards, however, the Government being able to come to terms with Mr Willcox the original plan was carried out, and drawings were prepared for a tubular iron girder bridge, upon stone piers. The ironwork was made at Sir Morton Peto and Co.'s factory at Birkenhead; and shipped in two vessels at Liverpool. One of the vessels, containing the ironwork for the first and third spans, was wrecked shortly after leaving the Mersey; but the loss was immediately replaced, and in a little over six months from the date of fixing the first portion of the ironwork the bridge was finished.

The approaches for distance of 980 feet on the northern side, and 440 feet on the southern, are of timber in bays of four upright and two battering piles, secured by wallings and bracings, with openings of twenty-five feet; the ballast and permanent way is laid on planking, resting on double longitudinal girders with traverse joists.

The iron girders rest on four oval stone piers of eighty feet by twenty feet at the base, tapering off to fifty-two by twelve, with vertical openings and surmounted by an impost course. The whole of the stone used in their construction was obtained from a sandstone quarry about a mile distant.

The foundation of three of the piers rests on the bed rock; the fourth, that nearest to the Southern bank, on piles and concrete borings to a depth of sixty-five feet having failed to give indications of a more secure basis. The total distance between the extreme piers is 486 feet, which is spanned by two longitudinal girders, each twelve and a half feet high and twenty-five feet apart, with kelson girders every three feet, having their ends rivetted to the bottom boxes. The girders are surmounted by a roadway composed of ironbark planking, on which the rails are laid; the height between the roadway and the ordinary level of the river is sixty-five feet. The total cost of the viaduct was about £80,000. Nearly 1000 tons of iron and 80,000 cubic feet of timber have been used in its construction and everything that engineering skill could devise has been done to give stability to the work : the most severe tests that could be applied have produced a deflection of only six-tenths of an inch.'

In 2003, there were concerns for the structural soundness of the Viaduct.

== Menangle village today ==
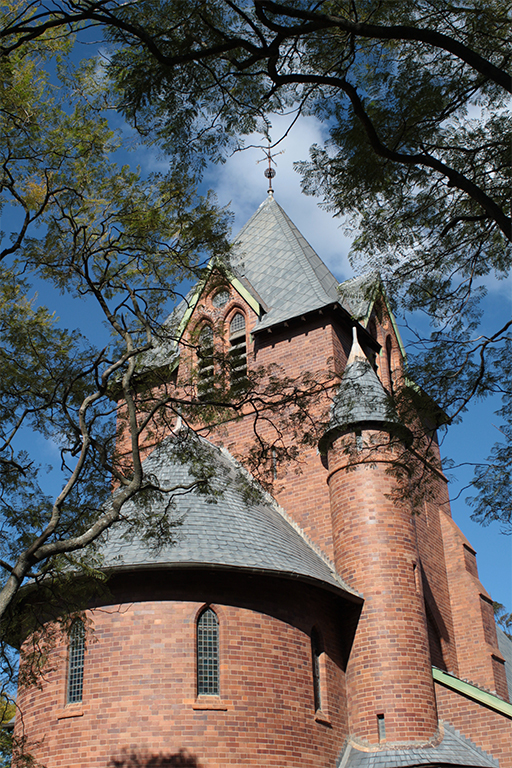
Northern aspect St James Church

The village is serviced by the Menangle railway station. The station is on the Main Southern railway line.

Menangle has several heritage-listed buildings. These include Camden Park House, The Menangle Store, the Rotolactor, Gilbulla, The Pines, Menangle railway station, and the Menangle Railway Viaduct.

Menangle has two churches, St James Anglican and St Patrick's Catholic Church. Both churches are Heritage Listed. St Patrick's is 'a typical example of a "Simplified Gothic Revival" country church of its time.' St James (1876–1896) 'has historical significance through its links with the Macarthur-Onslow family of "Camden Park" and "Gilbulla", and its associations with two leading architects, John Horbury Hunt and Sir John Sulman.'

The primary school has been closed for more than twenty years and is awaiting restoration.

The village's population was expanded in the 1990s with the release of Camden Park Land to Westcoast developers. A Development Control plan was created to manage the heritage of the village. Until this time, water was pumped from the Nepean River; however, in 1992 the developers provided a new water supply.

== Menangle Gallery ==
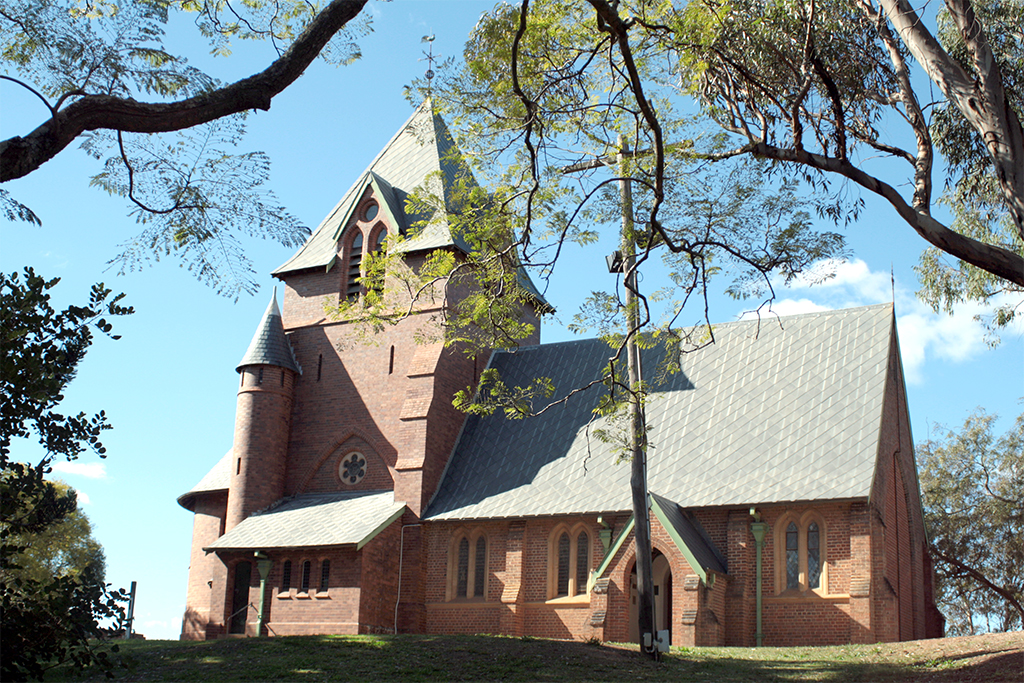
St James Church

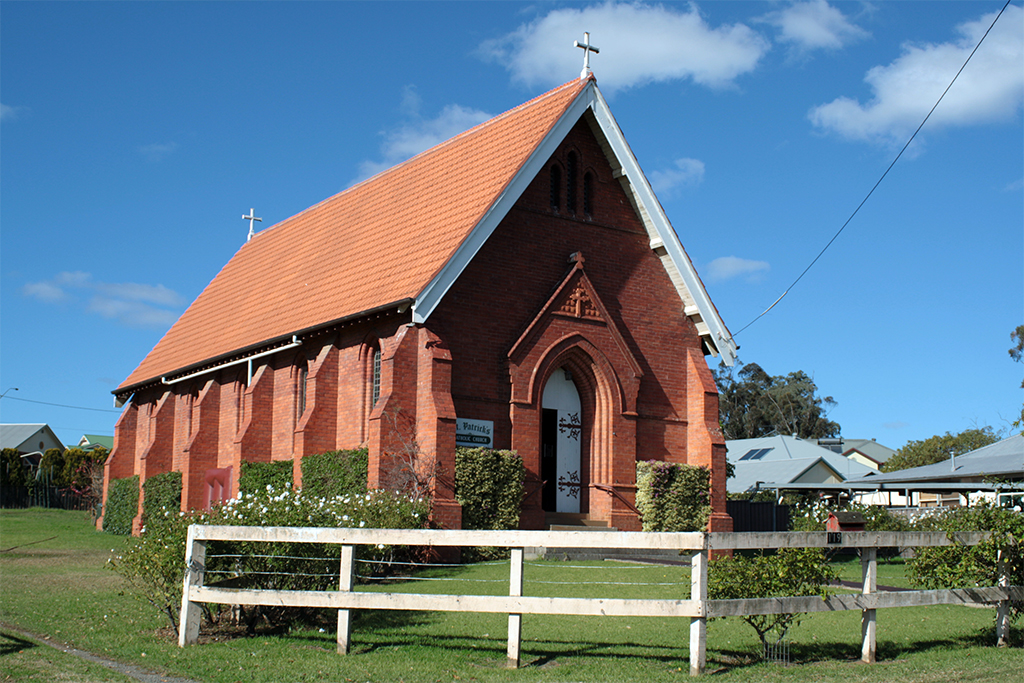
St Patrick's Church

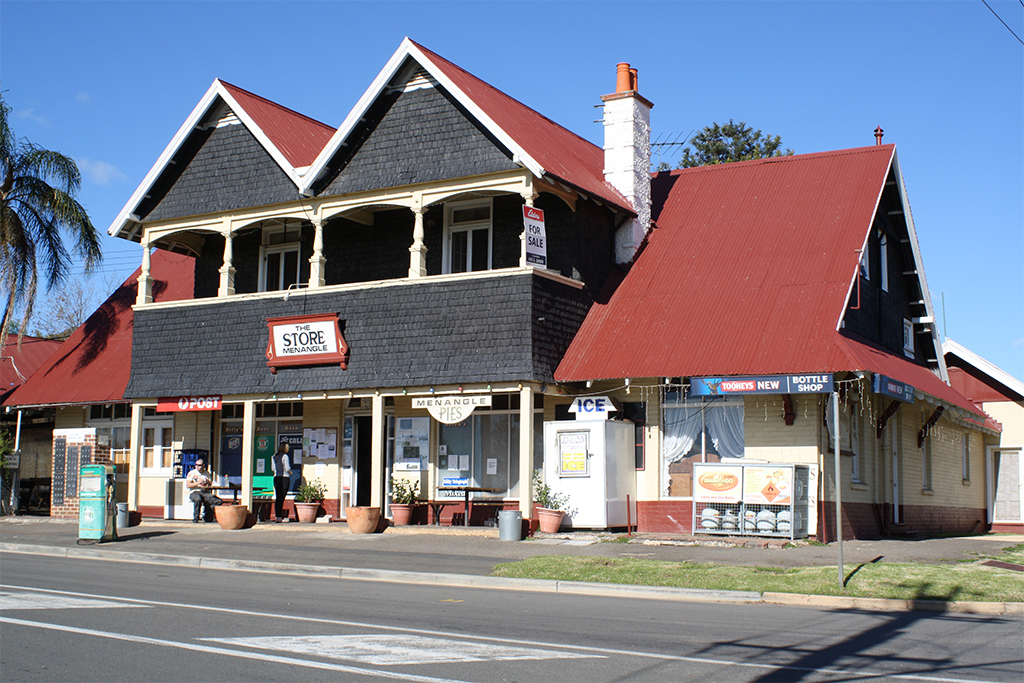
Menangle Store

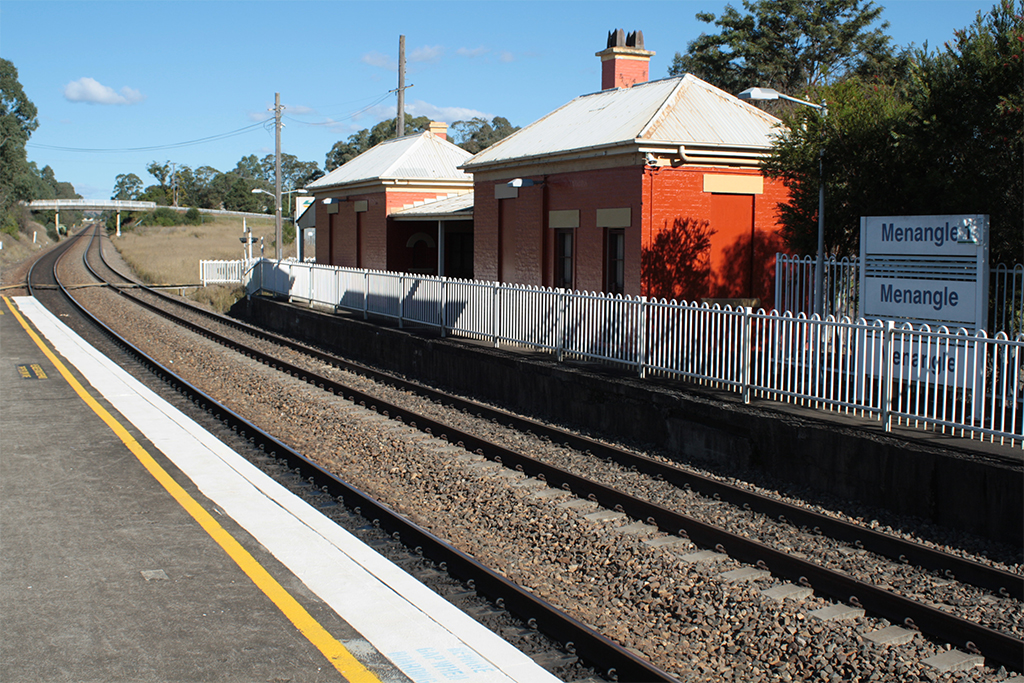
Heritage listed station buildings

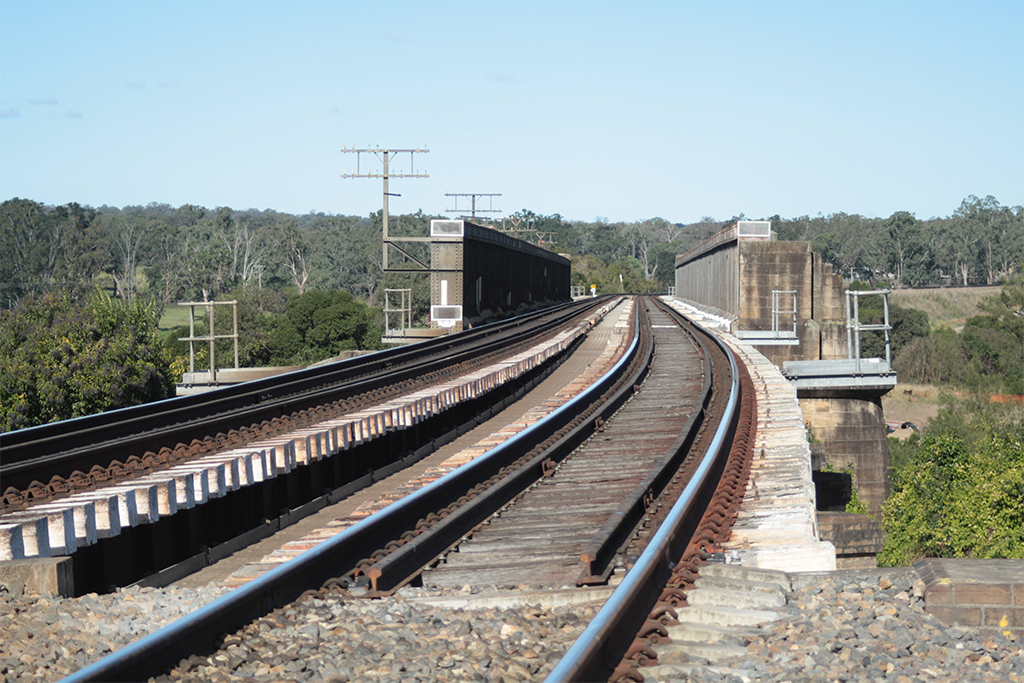
Railway Viaduct: deck

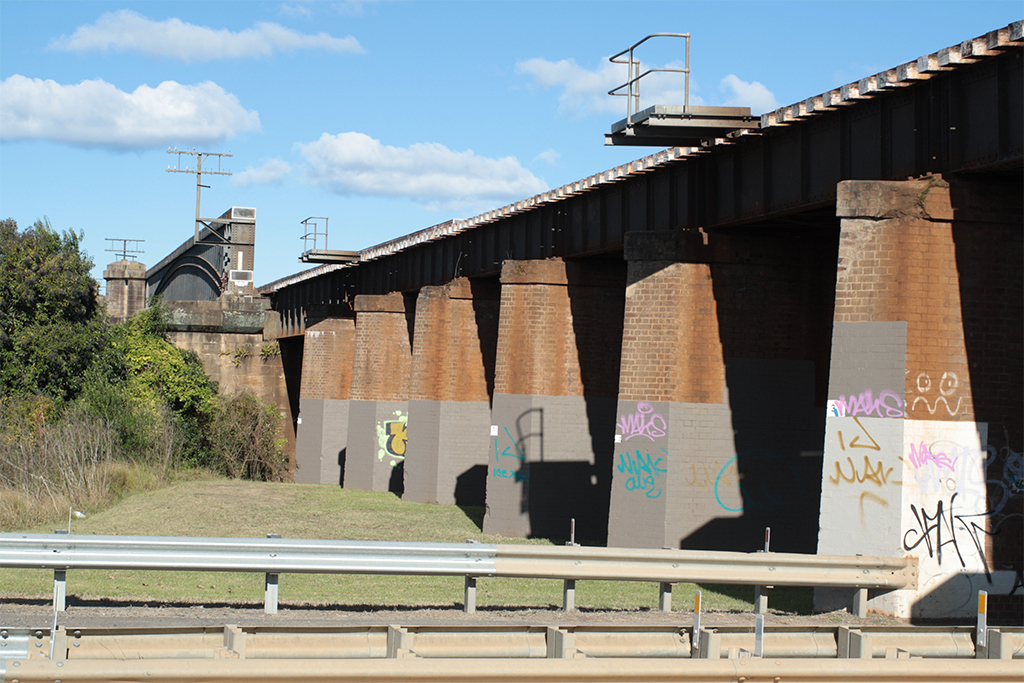
Railway Viaduct: northern approach

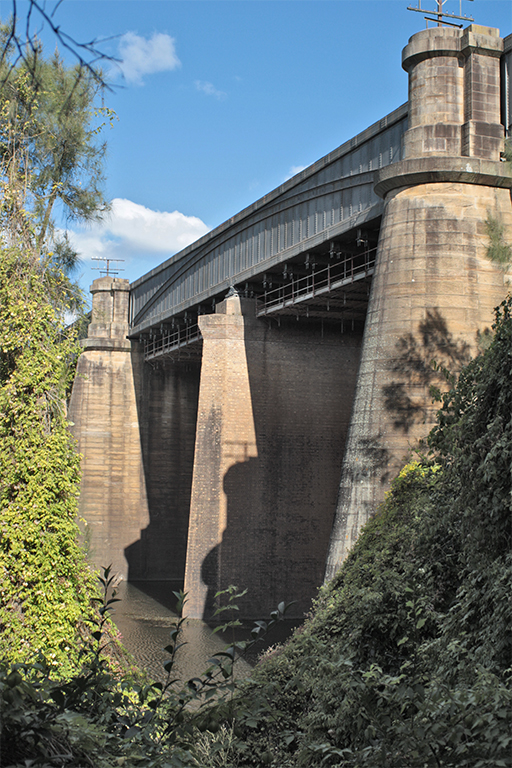
Railway Viaduct: eastern side

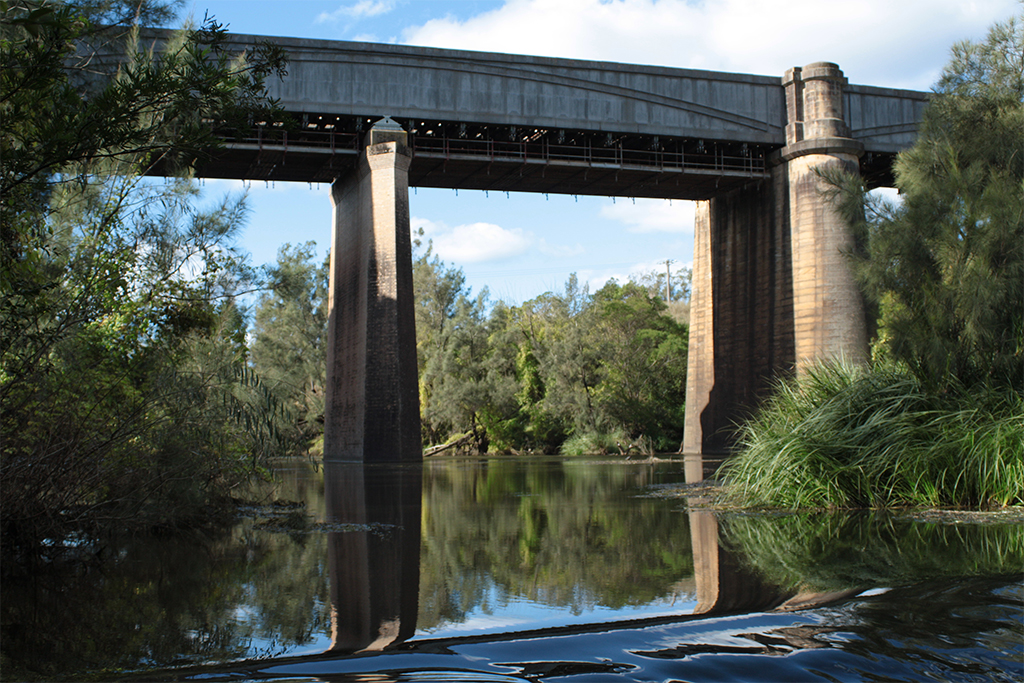
Railway Viaduct: western side
