= John Trevor Kelly =

Australian convicted murderer

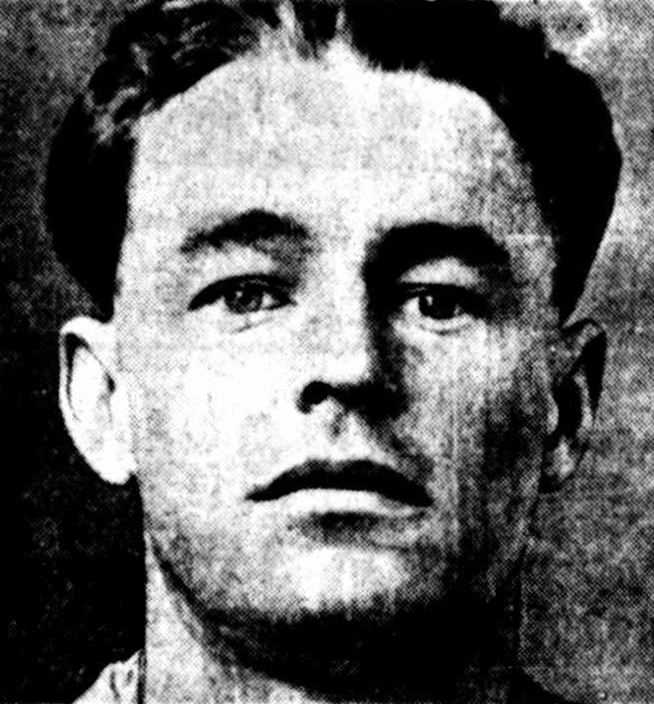
- John Trevor Kelly (from prisoner identification photograph, dated October 1937).
- Born: John Trevor Martin Kelly; 1914; Tenterfield, New South Wales, Australia
- Died: 24 August 1939 (aged 24); Long Bay Penitentiary, Malabar, New South Wales, Australia
- Cause of death: Execution by hanging
- Occupations: Motor mechanic, farm worker
- Status: Executed
- Convictions: Murder; Abduction
- Penalty: Death

John Trevor Kelly (1914 – 24 August 1939) was an Australian convicted murderer. He had a history of criminal behaviour in the Lismore district from about 1935, mainly involving cheque fraud (often associated with alcohol consumption). In September 1937, Kelly was convicted of the abduction of a young girl, whom he had planned to molest, and served a sentence of about a year in a prison farm. In early February 1939, he was working as a farmhand at 'Hillcrest' farm near Tenterfield, where he brutally murdered Marjorie Constance Sommerlad, the sister of the farm's owner. Kelly was executed for the crime at Long Bay Penitentiary in August 1939. He was the last person to be judicially executed in the state of New South Wales.

== Early years ==
John Trevor Kelly was born in 1914 at Tenterfield, a regional township in north-east New South Wales (close to the border with Queensland). He was the son and youngest child of Michael Kelly and Johanna (née Larracy). John had an older sister, Maureen, born in June 1910 in Queensland. Soon after John's birth, the Kelly family moved to Lismore. The family lived at 71 Union-street in South Lismore, and from the early 1920s, John's father, M. A. ('Mick') Kelly, worked as a livestock agent for Barnes' Bacon Co. (based at Homebush Bay in Sydney).

Kelly's older sister Maureen died at her parents' residence in Union-street, Lismore, on 3 March 1927, aged 17 years.

== A respectable young man ==
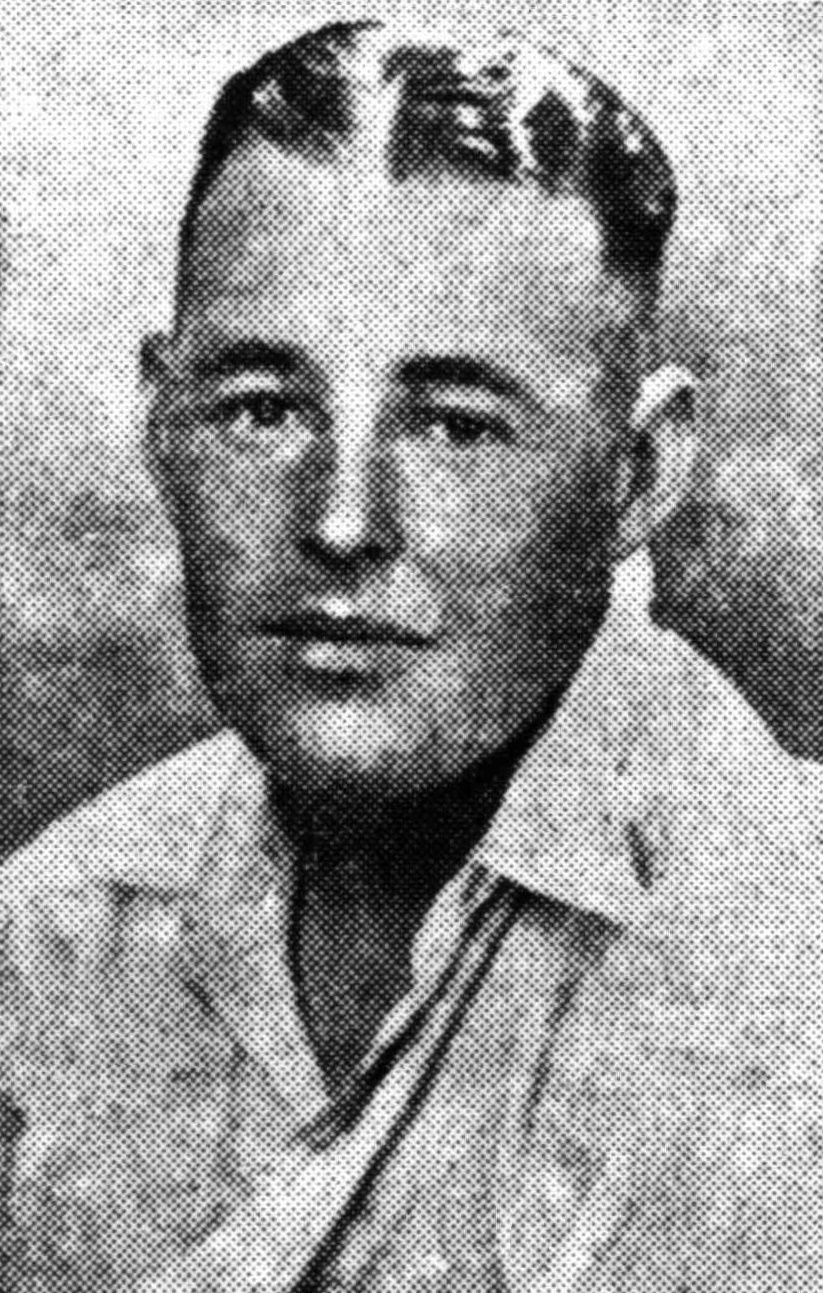
John Trevor Kelly (photograph published in Lismore's Northern Star newspaper, 4 May 1939).

John Trevor ('Jack') Kelly worked as a motor mechanic. In 1934, when he was aged about 20, Kelly was injured in a motor vehicle accident.

In the early evening of 26 December 1934, Kelly was stopped by the police for driving a motor car without lights at Coraki, a small township near Lismore. Kelly told the policeman the headlights need to be fixed; he gave his name as 'John Stewart' and said his driver's license "was at home". After being dealt with by the police, Kelly got into the car, switched on the headlights and drove away. Subsequent enquiries revealed the driver's actual name was John Trevor Kelly. At the Coraki Police Court in February 1935, Kelly did not appear but sent a letter pleading guilty of the charges of driving without lights and giving a false name; he was fined two pounds (with eight shillings costs) for each offence.

At about ten minutes after ten o'clock at night on 19 January 1935, Kelly went to the Royal Hotel in Lismore and asked the licensee, Charles Spillane, for a drink. As it was after hours and Kelly was known to be a local, Spillane refused to serve him. While the publican was distracted, Kelly opened the bar door and took 14 shillings off the ledge of the till. He was seen and Spillane detained the young man and called the police. Two days later, Kelly faced the Police Magistrate. In outlining the details of the case, Constable Hunt commented that Kelly "was a respectable young man". He was fined one pound (in default two days' imprisonment) for being on licensed premises after hours and three pounds on the charge of stealing the money (in default six days' imprisonment). In view of Kelly's previous good character, the Police Magistrate allowed him a month to pay the fines.

== Criminal record ==
Police evidence at Kelly's trial in September 1937 stated that prior to 1935, Kelly "was regarded as a respectable lad, but since then he had been going downhill". The young man was "addicted to drink and associated with young men of the larrikin type". His parents were regarded as highly respected members of the Lismore community "and had done everything in their power to put him on the right road".

On 22 February 1936, Kelly was stopped by the police while driving a motor lorry in Lismore. When asked for his license, he said it had expired in November and he had misplaced the renewal notice "and did not bother about it". He was fined one pound (with eight shillings costs).

Shortly after midnight on 16 May 1936, Kelly was stopped by the Lismore police and was found to be under the influence of alcohol. A leather overcoat was found in the car which had been reported as stolen from the Federalette hall earlier in the evening. A day or so later, Kelly stole a blank cheque from a cheque book belonging to the partnership of Black & Black, garage proprietors in Lismore. On May 18, he falsely claimed to Mervyn Jones, a barman at the Hotel Gollan, that the cheque was a genuine order for £20 10s, purporting to be signed by 'J. Black'.

On 21 May 1936, Kelly appeared before the Lismore Police Court, charged with fraudulently passing the cheque three days earlier and obtaining drinks to the value of five shillings and £20.5s in cash. He was remanded to a later date to face charges from May 16, with bail set at £20 (with sureties of a like amount). The four charges were dealt with on May 25. Kelly pleaded guilty to each charge. His solicitor, Thomas Rummery, said that his client's "lapse was due to unemployment". His "inability to obtain work had caused fits of despondency, during which he drank heavily". Rummery claimed "it was only while under the influence of liquor that he was guilty of dishonesty". During the hearing Mr. Starkey, a local contractor, offered to give Kelly permanent employment. The Police Magistrate, Henry Hawkins, said that "he did not think the defendant was worthy of much consideration, but that he did not feel disposed to put the gaol brand on him at present". He imposed fines amounting to £11 15s and bound Kelly to a bond of £40 (with sureties of a like amount) to be of good behaviour for two years (in default, imprisonment for three months). Hawkins also strongly advised Kelly to undertake not to drink liquor.

On 22 February 1937, Kelly fraudulently passed a cheque to a storekeeper in Lismore, obtaining cigarettes and cash. Soon afterwards, he was arrested in Coolangatta, supposedly "heading for North Queensland". After appearing in the Coolangatta Police Court, Kelly was returned to Lismore. On March 8, he again faced Police Magistrate Hawkins in the Lismore Police Court, where it was revealed that in recent months Kelly had "passed several valueless cheques in the district" which his father had "made good" for his son "to avoid trouble". Hawkins reminded Kelly: "Last time you were here I gave you an opportunity to show that you had manhood enough to stick to your father and behave yourself for two years". The Police Magistrate told him "you have made a very fine start towards a career of crime", before sentencing the young man to fourteen days' imprisonment with hard labour, to be served at Lismore.

At the Lismore Quarter Sessions in April 1937, Kelly was charged with abduction, accused of having "fraudulently allured a girl, aged 14 years and five months, from out of the possession of and against the will of her mother, with intent to commit a serious offence". He was also charged with carnal knowledge of the girl. Kelly was remanded on bail of £80 to stand trial at the next sitting of the court. At the following Quarter Sessions in Lismore in August 1937, Kelly failed to appear to answer the charges. A warrant was issued for his arrest. Kelly subsequently appeared before Judge Sheridan and was remanded without bail to answer the charges at the Lismore sittings of the Supreme Court in September.

On 23 September 1937, Kelly was found guilty of abduction and not guilty of the second charge of carnal knowledge. Kelly's defence counsel claimed that his client's "irresponsible tendencies" had only developed after his motor accident in 1934 and "it might possibly benefit him if he were placed under medical observation". The following day, a sentence of 18 months' imprisonment was imposed on Kelly by Justice Halse Rogers. The judge recommended that he serve the sentence on a prison farm and that the prisoner "be placed under medical observation to ascertain if the injuries he sustained in a motor accident some time ago had had any permanent mental effect".

Jack Kelly's mother had begun to develop mental problems. Prior to 1939, she was admitted to the Broughton Hall Psychiatric Clinic at Callan Park in Sydney's Inner West, "definitely out of her mind".

== Murder ==
During his incarceration, towards the end of 1937, Kelly received treatment at Long Bay Penitentiary in Sydney for a "venereal disorder".

Kelly was released from the prison farm in November 1938. He worked for Stanley Huckerby of Tenterfield from 29 December 1938 until 9 January 1939. Soon afterwards, 'Jack' Kelly was employed by Eric Sommerlad to work on 'Hillcrest' farm, a dairy and orchard farm four-and-a-half miles (7.2 km) from Tenterfield on the Warwick Road. It was later reported that Eric considered Kelly to be "a good worker on the farm, and easy to get on with". During his employment at 'Hillcrest', Kelly had his meals at the house and slept on the verandah.

On Saturday morning, 4 February 1939, Miss Dulcie Sommerlad discovered the body of her 35-year-old sister, Marjorie Constance Sommerlad (known to the family as 'Connie'), at her home at 'Hillcrest'. Miss Sommerlad's body, dressed in her night attire, was lying in the hallway near the entrance to her bedroom, "her head fearfully battered". Dulcie Sommerlad then discovered her brother Eric unconscious in his bed on the verandah; he was bleeding from wounds in his head and neck, including "a deep gash in the back of his head".

Dulcie Sommerlad was a nurse living at Coonabarabran. She had been visiting her mother and other family members at Glen Innes before travelling by train to Tenterfield to stay with her older sister and brother. She continued her journey to the farm by car where "the shocking tragedy" was revealed. When police attended the scene, they found a blood-stained axe and discovered that a Studebaker utility truck belonging to Eric Sommerlad was missing. Police suspected the killer was the farm-hand, John Trevor Kelly. His description and details of the utility truck were sent to police stations in New South Wales and southern Queensland.

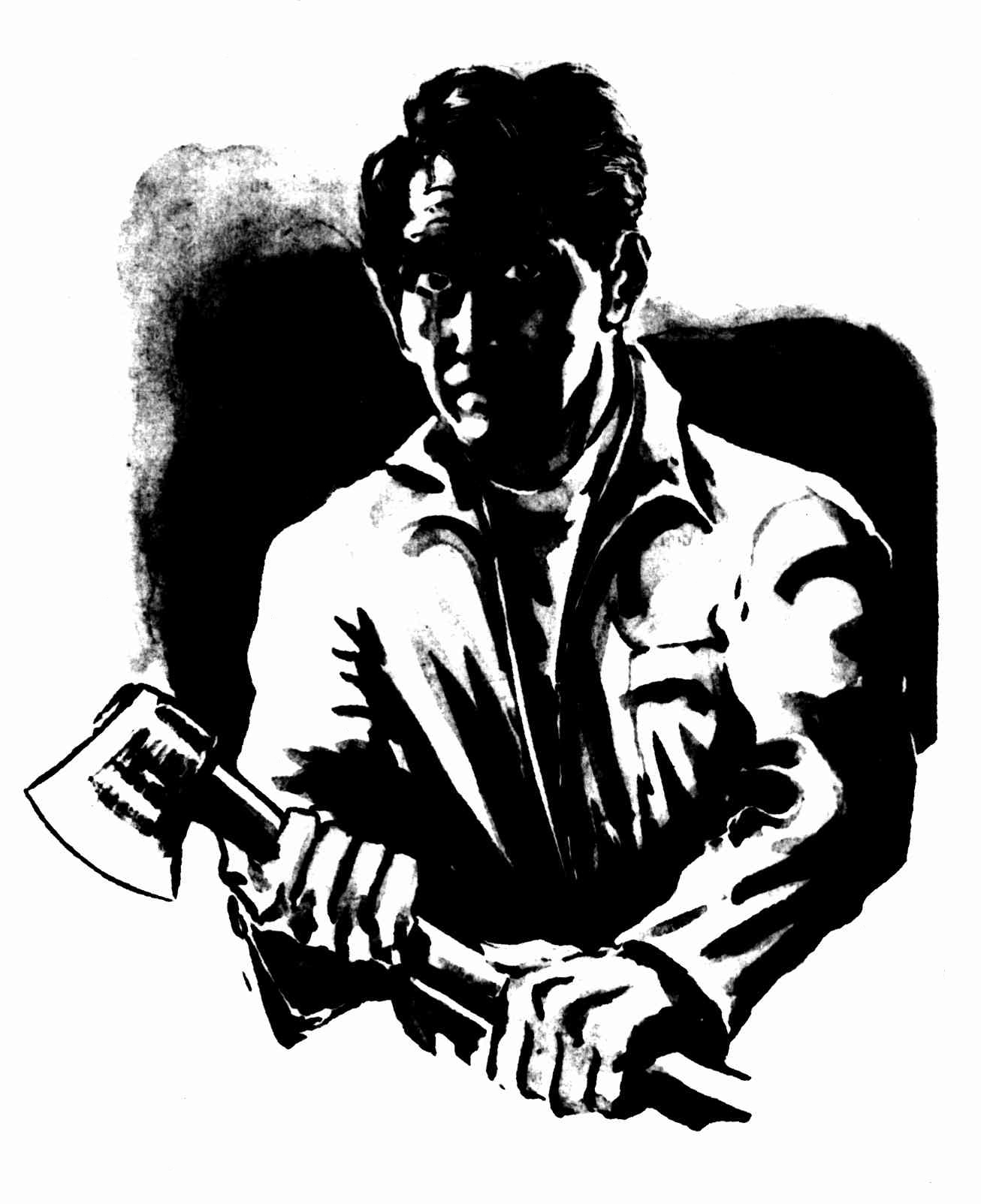
Illustration to a 1951 article by Hugh Buggy, detailing the murder of Marjorie Sommerlad by John Trevor Kelly.

That evening detectives in Brisbane located the green Studebaker truck in a Brisbane garage, left there for repairs. Detectives also interviewed a taxi-driver who had earlier picked up the driver of the utility truck from the garage, a man answering the description of the 'Hillcrest' employee, Jack Kelly. In the early hours of Sunday morning, detectives arrested John Trevor Kelly in a room at Astor-terrace, in the inner Brisbane suburb of Spring Hill and detained him for questioning.

At the Brisbane C.I.B., Kelly admitted to the murder. He told detectives that he and Eric Sommerlad had gone into Tenterfield on Friday evening, February 3. He said they had arranged to meet at midnight to return to 'Hillcrest' together, but Kelly claimed Sommerlad did not turn up, so he engaged a hire car to return to the farm. Kelly told the Brisbane detectives that upon his arrival, Sommerlad gave him notice to finish up work on Sunday, "because owing to drink he could not depend on me carrying out my work satisfactorily". Kelly claimed this caused him to lose control of his temper. He then went outside, grabbed an axe and struck Eric Sommerlad, who was on his bed on the verandah. He then heard Eric's sister coming from her room along the hallway. Kelly met her near the door to the dining room and bludgeoned her with the back of the axe.

Kelly was returned to Tenterfield in police custody where he gave a different version of the events to Detective-Sergeant Snowden of Lismore. After he returned to 'Hillcrest' soon after midnight on February 4, Kelly recounted that he went to Miss Sommerlad's bedroom to give her a letter and a packet of A.P.C. powders that she had requested he get for her in Tenterfield for headache relief. He said he was "talking to her for some time, sitting on the edge of the bed", when "a desire for her took possession of me, but on making the suggestion to Miss Sommerlad she opposed it" and called out to her brother. Kelly struck her on the face with his fist and left the room. Marjorie followed him into the hallway where Kelly again struck her with his fist, knocking her down. He told Snowden he then went outside and returned with an axe. Marjorie screamed and he hit her with the axe. He then rushed to the verandah and "thinking that Eric Sommerlad might awaken and see that an accident had happened to his sister, I hit him with the axe".

An inquest into the death of Marjorie Constance Sommerlad was held at Tenterfield over two days on 8 and 9 March 1939. The Coroner, Edgar Jennings, returned a finding that Miss Sommerlad died "from the effects of wounds caused by blows feloniously and maliciously inflicted by Kelly". He ordered Kelly's committal to the State Penitentiary at Long Bay, in the Sydney suburb of Malabar, to await trial.

== Trial and appeals ==
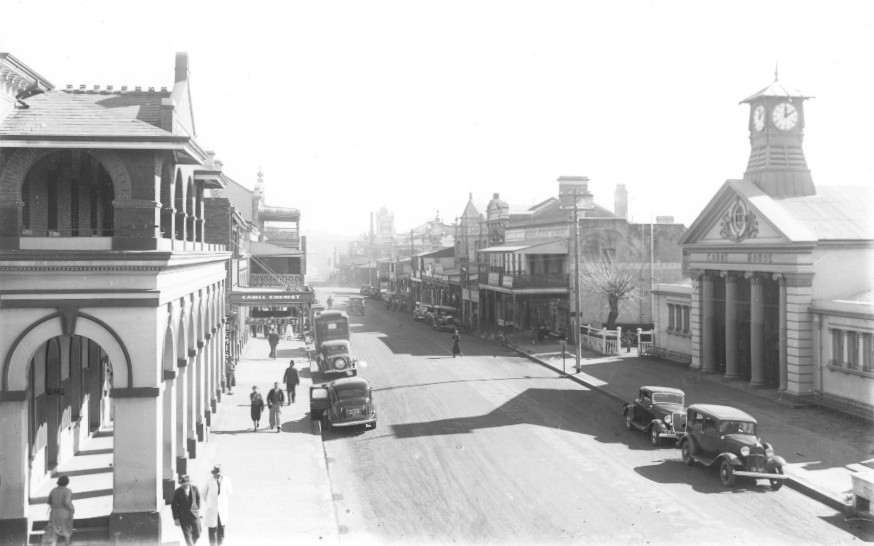
Beardy Street in Armidale, New South Wales (the Court House on the right).

Kelly was tried on the 2 and 3 May 1939 before Justice Halse Rogers at a sitting of the Supreme Court at the Court House in Armidale. Kelly pleaded not guilty. The defence barrister, Wilfred McMinn, maintained his client was insane at the time the crime was committed. The prosecution called medical witnesses whose testimonies led to the conclusion that, although the defendant was of below average intelligence, there was "no evidence to suggest the slightest degree of mental disorder". McMinn asked the jury "to consider the effect of drink on such a man with sub-normal mental capacity", and claimed the defendant's mind had been "so inflamed and depreciated by drink that he could not appreciate the nature of his crime". Eric Sommerlad had been released from hospital and gave evidence at the trial. He explained that on February 3, he had driven Kelly into Tenterfield and arranged to meet him again at 11 p.m. Sommerlad said he waited until 11.45, but as Kelly failed to appear, he drove home. He talked with his sister for half an hour and then went to bed. He remembered nothing more until he regained consciousness in hospital.

The jury returned a verdict of guilty after which Justice Halse Rogers commented that Kelly's crime was "a murder of extraordinary ferocity" and "the evidence disclosed no mitigating circumstances whatsoever". The judge then asked Kelly if he had anything to say as to why sentence of death should not be passed upon him; after a pause he said: "No, only that I am sorry for what happened".

Kelly made an unsuccessful appeal against his conviction and sentence of death to the Court of Criminal Appeal in Sydney, which was heard on 26 May 1939. Kelly's barrister submitted "that the circumstances of the murder were such that it could only have been done by a lunatic". However, Chief Justice Jordan concluded "the crime was a foul and brutal one, but there was nothing to suggest that Kelly was insane at the time".

Kelly's defence counsel sought leave to appeal to the High Court on the grounds "that the evidence had been so overwhelmingly in favour of insanity that the jury's verdict was perverse". On August 3, the High Court unanimously refused Kelly's leave to appeal. Justice Starke said, "the case was without merit and quite hopeless" and expressed his "astonishment that the State would have provided funds for Kelly to appeal".

== Execution ==
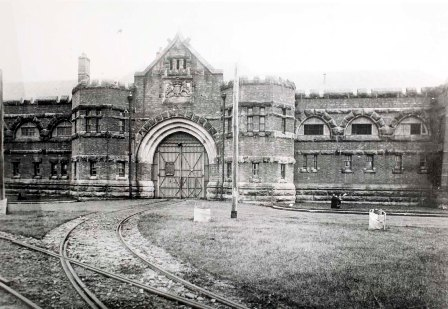
Long Bay Gaol (photographed in about 1900).

On 9 August 1939, the New South Wales Executive Council approved the recommendation of the State Cabinet that Kelly should be hanged on August 24. In reaching its decision the Cabinet under Premier Alexander Mair had considered a transcript of the evidence and the judge's report, as well as medical reports and letters and petitions.

On 12 August 1939, Samuel Rosenberg, organising secretary of the Howard Prison Reform League, began a fast to draw attention to his organisation's campaign for abolition of the death penalty. During the thirteen days until Kelly's execution, Rosenberg consumed only spinach, water and orange juice, but "smoked innumerable cigarettes". After the government decided to go ahead with Kelly's execution, Mick Kelly wrote to the Brisbane Truth newspaper, comparing his son's case with other recent crimes that had been commuted. He claimed his son "was in a frenzy from drink" when he committed his crimes and concluded: "Praying that you will do all in your power to prevent the awful fate assigned to my boy, as there has been enough sorrow to both families already".

John Trevor Kelly, aged about 24 years, was hanged at the Long Bay Penitentiary a few minutes after eight o'clock on the morning of 24 August 1939.

Samuel Rosenberg ended his self-imposed thirteen-day fast after Kelly was hanged, having lost 13 pounds (5.9 kilograms) in weight. He stated his intention to enter a nursing home "to recuperate". Rosenberg vowed the campaign to abolish the death penalty "will go on" and lamented that "the public becomes interested in reform only when a man is to be hanged".

Kelly was the last person to be judicially executed in the state of New South Wales. Capital punishment remained a possibility in the state until 1955, but after Kelly's execution in 1939, successive governments automatically commuted death sentences to a term of imprisonment. In 1955, with the Labor party in control of both houses of the State Parliament, New South Wales abolished the death penalty for crimes such as murder and rape. Crimes such as treason and piracy remained as legislated capital offences until 1985.

== The victims ==
The victims of Kelly's violence were members of a large and well-known landholding family in the New England district. The original family property, 'Spring Valley' near Tenterfield, was settled in the 1870s by the German immigrant John Henry (Johan Heinrich) Sommerlad and his wife Louisa (Marjorie and Eric Sommerlad's grandparents). By the 1930s, many of the male members of the Sommerlad family were landholders in the Tenterfield and Glen Innes districts. Ernest Sommerlad, Marjorie and Eric Sommerlad's uncle, was elected to the New South Wales Legislative Council in 1932.

- Marjorie Constance ('Connie') Sommerlad – born in 1903 at Tenterfield, the daughter of Albert Sommerland and Emma (née Mansfield). She was the second-born of 14 children in the family and was known as 'Connie' by her family. Her father, Albert Sommerlad, died in December 1933 after which her mother Emma moved to Glen Innes to live with two of her daughters. Connie and her mother, together with Tolla Gibson-Briant, formed a company called Child Study Health Food Co. In May 1934, a creditor petitioned for the bankruptcy of the company. A sequestration order was granted on 2 July 1934. In May 1935, an application to annul the sequestration order was approved, on the basis of ten shillings in the pound having been accepted by the creditors. By 1939, Connie Sommerlad was living and working as a housekeeper on her brother's 'Hillcrest' farm near Tenterfield and was engaged to be married to Walter Bridgeman, a grazier with holdings in the Pelican district in south-east Queensland. She was murdered by John Trevor Kelly in her home at 'Hillcrest' in the early hours of 4 February 1939.
- Eric Alfred Sommerlad – born in 1914 at Tenterfield, the tenth of 14 children of Albert and Emma Sommerland. He was seriously injured when attacked by John Trevor Kelly at his home, 'Hillcrest' near Tenterfield. He was later transferred to a hospital in Brisbane, from where he was discharged in March 1939. In 1942, Eric married Byrel Jean Nerney at Kyogle in the Northern Rivers region of New South Wales. The couple had two daughters. Eric Sommerlad died on 19 July 1976 at Kyogle, aged 62 years.
