= Callan Park Hospital for the Insane =

Former hospital in New South Wales, Australia

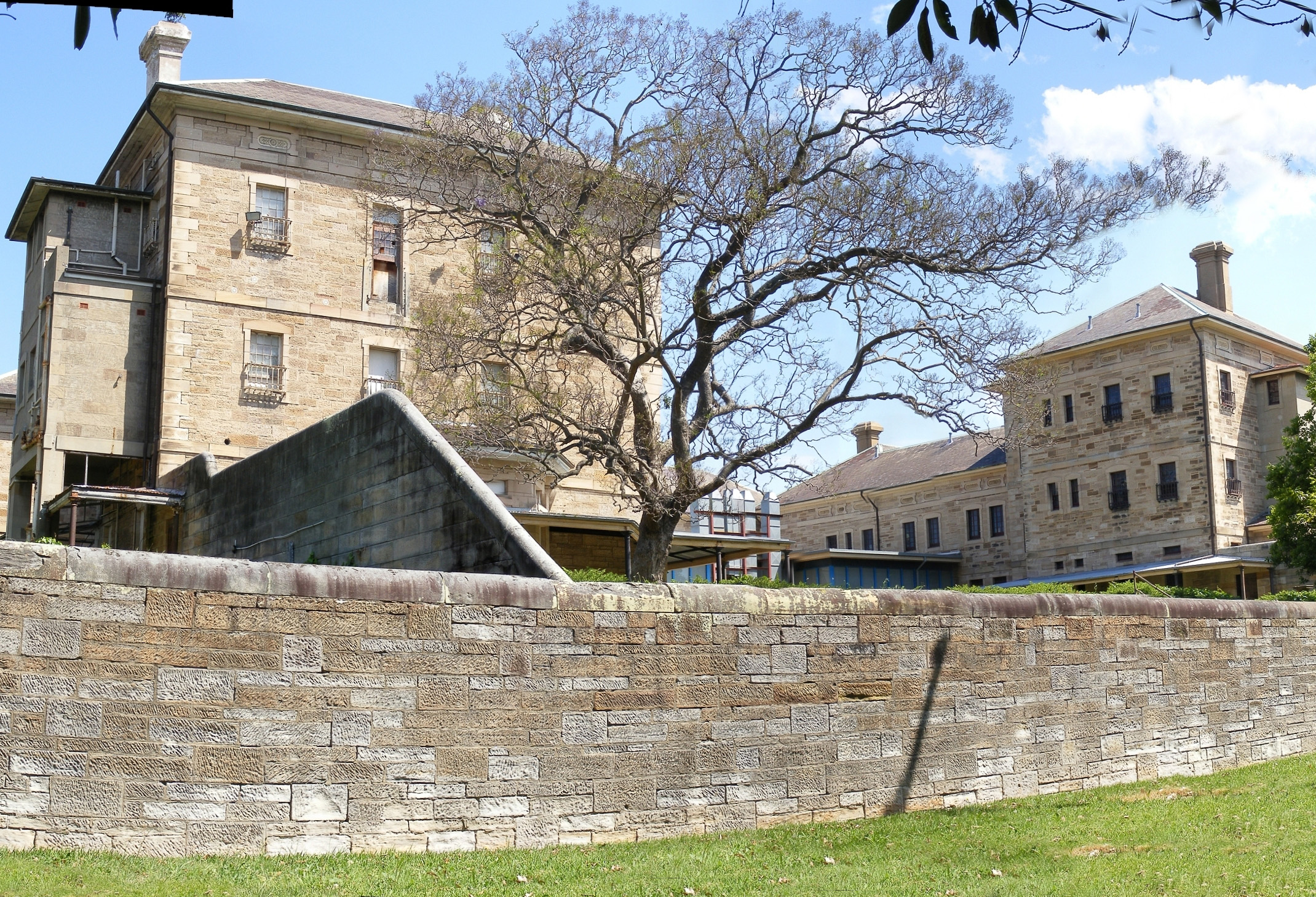
- General view of the former hospital

Geography
- Location: Lilyfield, New South Wales, Australia
- Coordinates: 33°51′57″S 151°09′44″E

Organisation
- Type: Disused mental hospital

History
- Founded: 1878
- Closed: April 2008 (as Rozelle Hospital)

Links
- Lists: Hospitals in Australia
- Building details
- Location in Greater Sydney
- Alternative names: Callan Park Hospital for the Insane (1878–1914); Callan Park Mental Hospital (1915–1976); Callan Park Hospital (1976–1994); Rozelle Hospital (1994–2008)

General information
- Architectural style: Neo-classical; Victorian
- Current tenants: Writing NSW
- Owner: Government of New South Wales via NSW Ministry of Health

Technical details
- Material: Sandstone
- Grounds: 61 hectares (150 acres)

Design and construction
- Architects: James Barnet; Mortimer Lewis
- Architecture firm: Colonial Architect of New South Wales
- Other designers: Charles Moore (grounds); Dr Thomas Kirkbride; Dr Frederick Norton Manning (hospital design)

New South Wales Heritage Register
- Official name: Callan Park Conservation Area & Buildings; Callan Park House – Rozelle Hospital; Rozelle Hospital – Broughton Hall
- Designated: 2 April 1999
- Reference no.: 00818; 00823; 00831

The Callan Park Hospital for the Insane (1878–1914) is a heritage-listed former insane asylum, which was subsequently, for a time, used as a college campus, located in the grounds of Callan Park, an area on the shores of Iron Cove in Lilyfield, a suburb of Sydney, New South Wales, Australia. In 1915, the facility was renamed as the Callan Park Mental Hospital and, again in 1976, to Callan Park Hospital. Since 1994, the facility has been formally known as Rozelle Hospital. In April 2008, all Rozelle Hospital services and patients were transferred to Concord Hospital. The Callan Park (Special Provisions) Act, 2002 (NSW) restricts future uses of the site to health, tertiary education and community uses.

In 2015, the Government of New South Wales approved the master plan for the 61-hectare (150-acre) site and retains ownership in consultation with the Municipality of Leichhardt pending the establishment of a trust to manage the site's ongoing use as a wellness sanctuary, encompassing health, community and educational uses. Current tenants include Writing NSW (formerly the New South Wales Writers' Centre).

The current structure incorporates sandstone institutional buildings and houses that were based on designs by the colonial architects, James Barnet and Mortimer Lewis and grounds designed by botanist, Charles Moore, the founder of the Royal Botanic Gardens. The site was listed on the New South Wales Heritage Register on 2 April 1999.

== History ==
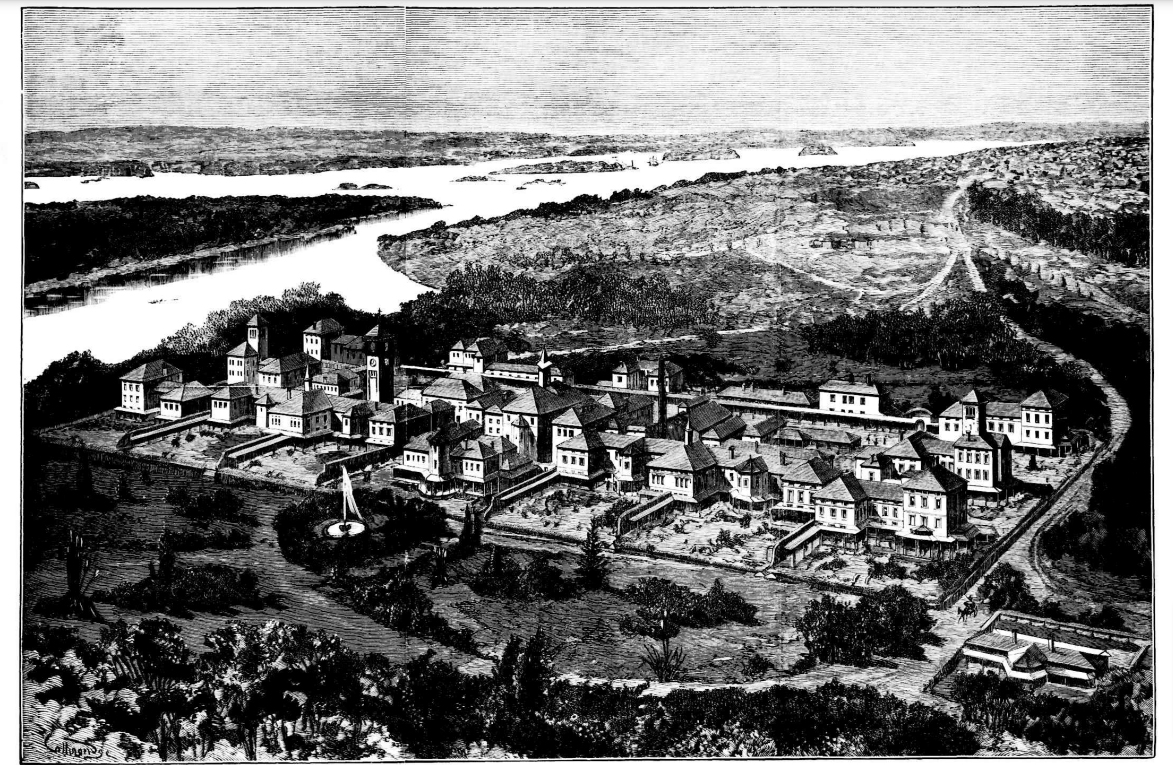
New Asylum, Callan Park, Sydney, 1879

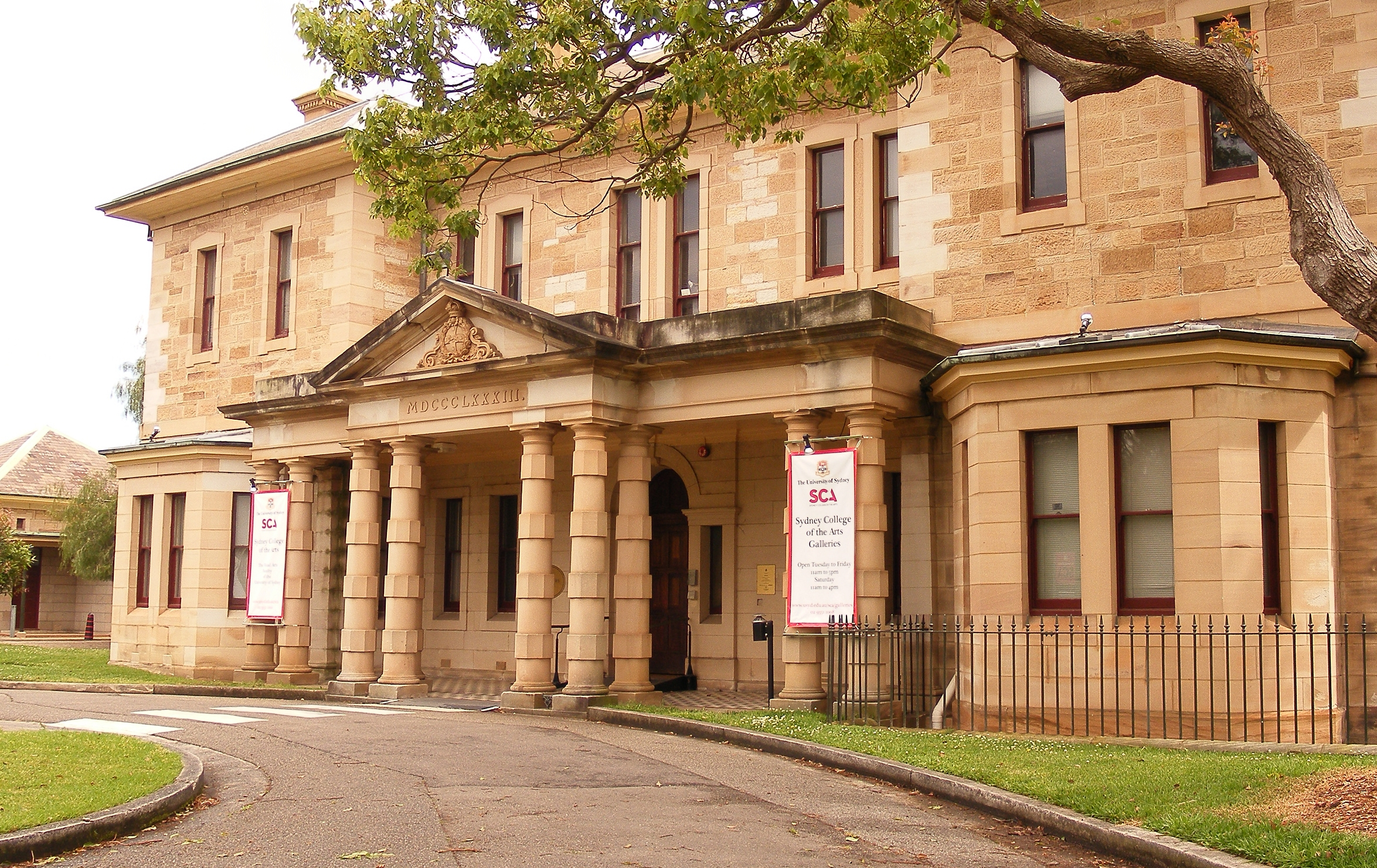
Rozelle Hospital.

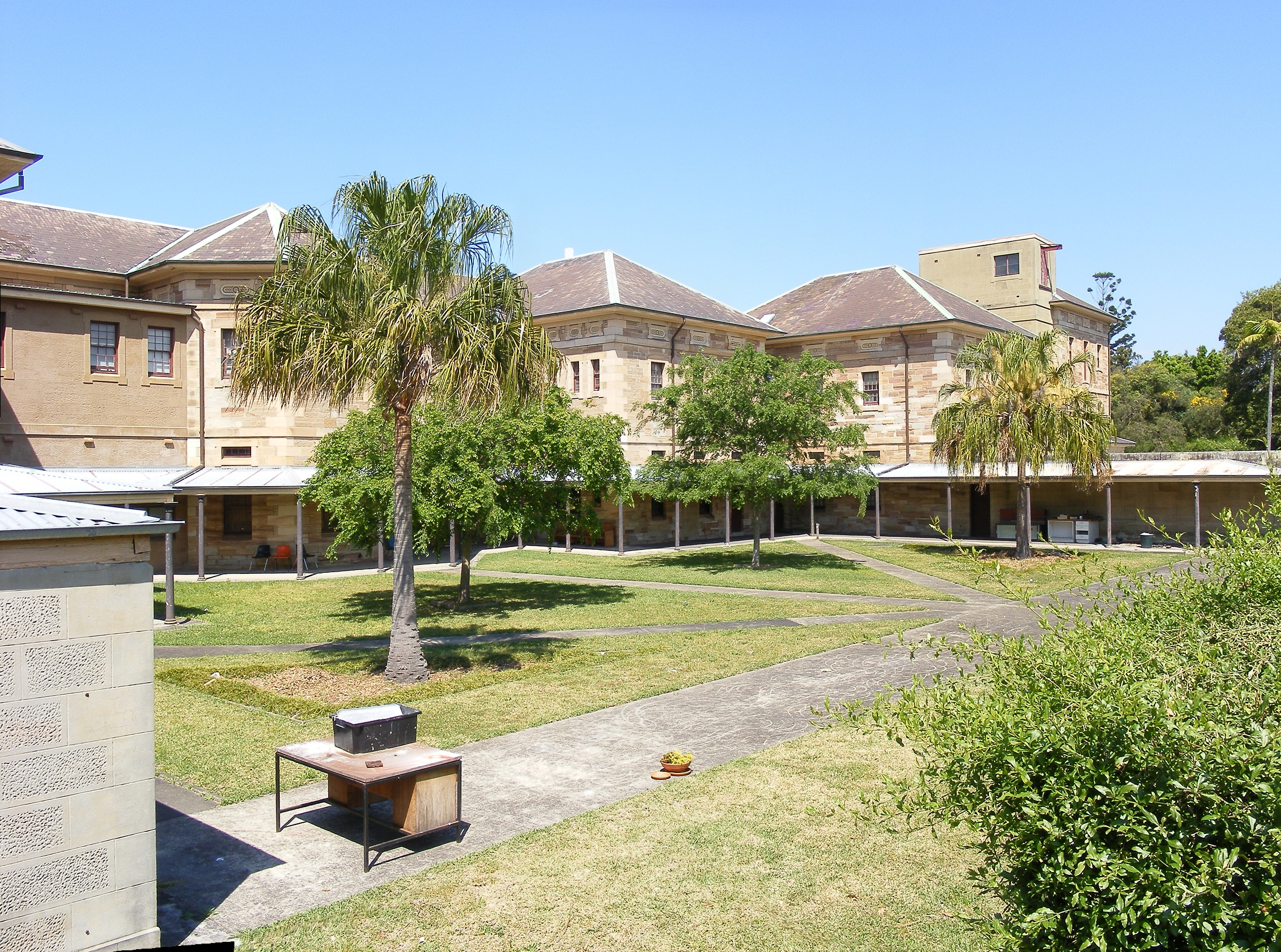
The Kirkbride Complex, Callan Park.

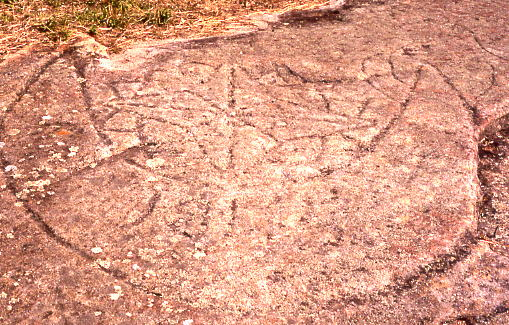
One of many rock carvings in the hospital grounds, possibly the work of former patients.

=== Indigenous, early colonial and residential use ===
Before European settlement the Wangal clan or band lived at the site and their territory extended along the Parramatta River from about Petersham westward. The Wangal were part of the Eora or Dharug tribes. Due to a smallpox epidemic between 1789 and 1790 and European land development, only about 50 people from Dharug families were living in the Sydney area by 1900.

The first European colonisation in the district was formed by 15 land grants between 1789 and 1821. The areas west of the peninsula were slow to develop, however the later land grants were instrumental in developing Rozelle Hospital. Francis Lloyd received 50 acres in 1819, and Luke Ralph received 50 acres in 1821, naming the latter "Fairlight". These adjoining grants stretched from Long or Iron Cove to Rozelle Bay. To their west, Lawrence Butler received 100 acres in 1819. These grants by the 1840s were in common ownership and became Garry Owen estate, later known as Callan Park.

To the west of Butler's grant was John Austen's 100 acre grant, which he received in 1819. This estate was initially called Spring Cove, but by the 1840s was known as Austenham. This was separated from the Garry Owen estate by a line formed by the extension northward of Wharf Road. Broughton Hall (built 1840s) was one of two substantial houses built on this estate: it would eventually form the adjacent "Broughton Hall Psychiatric Clinic", which while separate from the Callan Park Hospital for many years, would merge to form Rozelle Hospital in 1976.

Garry Owen House was built on the eponymous estate about 1839 for the estate's owner, Ryan Brenan. It was likely designed by Colonial Architect Mortimer Lewis. A contemporary description of the estate noted its "stately wrought iron gates, unequalled in the colony, supported on handsome pillars each one a block of stone with pedestal and cap, and a beautiful serpentine approach, the avenue lined with trees and choice shrubs, 1/8 of a mile long". Brenan was born in Garry Owen in Ireland. He arrived in New South Wales in 1834 with his second wife. Brenan was known to Governor Bourke (who was also Irish), and appointed Brenan as Coroner in 1835 and Police Magistrate in 1836. Brenan lost his job in the 1844 depression. In 1843 a sale was held at Garry Owen of all the household's furniture. In 1845 he gave up the rights to Garry Owen estate.

In either 1864 or 1865 (sources differ), Brenan sold the estate to Sydney businessman John Gordon, and moved to Maitland. Gordon renamed the property Callan Park, and in 1873 subdivided the land for auction as a new waterfront suburb.

=== Callan Park Hospital ===
In 1873, the Colonial Government of New South Wales purchased the Callan Park site, then known as "Callan Estates", with the purpose of building a large lunatic asylum to ease the severe overcrowding at the Gladesville Hospital for the Insane, at Bedlam Point, near Tarban Creek in Gladesville. The new lunatic asylum was designed according to the views of Dr Thomas Kirkbride, an American. Charles Moore, then Director of the Botanic Gardens, was entrusted with (re-)designing the grounds. Garry Owen House was then adapted as an asylum in 1875–86; though altered and extended, it remains substantially intact. Colonial Architect James Barnet worked with the Inspector of the Insane, Dr Frederick Norton Manning to produce a group of twenty neo-classical buildings, considerably extending the asylum operating out of the original house. These were completed in 1885 and named the Kirkbride Block.

In 1912, Balmain Road was widened, necessitating the relocation of the Balmain Road boundary wall, main gates and gateposts in addition to the removal of part of the original boundary plantation. Plants were sent to Callan Park between 1909 and 1912 but there is no indication where these were planted. The re-location of the entrance gates precipitated the need to reassess the alignment of the entry drive and by the 1920s the entry drive was relocated to its current position with plantings of Canary Island palms (Phoenix canariensis) defining its edge.

During World War I, changes to mental health care were instigated and in 1914 patients could only be treated if they were committed into one of the major institutions, resulting in additional facilities being built in the grounds.

Harry Richard Bailey (1922–1985), psychiatrist, Harry enrolled in science at the University of Sydney in 1940. Lacking money, he did not finish the course and found work as a pharmacist's assistant. He studied medicine at the University of Sydney (MB, BS, 1951; DPM, 1954), winning the Norton Manning memorial prize for psychiatry and the Major Ian Vickery prize for paediatrics.

After twelve months at Royal Prince Alfred Hospital, Bailey became a medical officer at Broughton Hall Psychiatric Clinic, Leichhardt, in 1952. That year he was appointed assistant-director of psychiatric clinical services in the Department of Public Health. He had already come under the influence of such prominent advocates of surgical and pharmacological treatments for mental illness as (Sir) William Trethowan and Cedric Swanton. From December 1954 he spent fifteen months on a World Health Organisation fellowship in the United States of America and Europe, closely observing the sedation techniques, psychosurgery and electroconvulsive therapy methods of Ewan Cameron in Canada, William Sargant in London and Lars Leksell in Sweden. On his recommendation, the Cerebral Surgery and Research Unit at Callan Park Mental Hospital was established in 1957. Bailey was named director. There he experimented with new ECT and psychosurgical methods, announcing significant developments in the successful treatment of mental illness. In 1952, Bailey was assistant director of clinical psychiatry for the public health service. Between 1962 and 1979, he served as chief psychiatrist at Chelmsford Private Hospital, Pennant Hills, northwest of Sydney. Under his care, 26 Chelmsford patients died.

In the 1960s, the hospital carried out electric shock therapy on certain patients.

Callan Park Hospital for the Insane merged with the adjacent Broughton Hall Psychiatric Clinic in 1976 to form Rozelle Hospital.

=== De-institutional care ===
The Kirkbride complex continued to be used for the housing and treatment of patients until 1994, when the last remaining services were transferred to other buildings in the Callan Park grounds, towards the Broughton Hall at the southern end of the site. Many patients were also transferred into buildings in the local community, in line with the policy of the State Government (see The Richmond Report of 1983 which accelerated the move towards de-institutionalising care), creating a number of social and moral problems.

In 2007, it was reported that the Minister for Planning, Frank Sartor MP had announced in Parliament that the University of Sydney and the Government had commenced discussions about the future use of Callan Park. The university and the Government proposed to enter into a memorandum of understanding and then a lease. In June 2008, Rozelle Hospital services and patients were transferred to Concord Hospital. In the face of strong community opposition, by October 2008 the Government rejected the university's plans to accommodate up to 6,000 students on the Callan Park site and announced that 40 hectares (99 acres) of the site would be handed to Leichhardt Council.

== Current use ==
The parklands are currently open to the public for use and enjoyment in accordance with the principal objects of the Callan Park (Special Provisions) Act 2002. The Callan Park (Special Provisions) Act, 2002 (NSW) restricts future uses of the site to health, tertiary education, and community (not-for-profit). Commercial (profit-making) activity in Callan Park is disallowed under the Act.

After a period of extensive renovation, the Kirkbride Complex which housed the former hospital, the Sydney College of the Arts, the fine arts campus of the University of Sydney, commenced occupancy under a 99-year lease. It was later revealed in Sartor's biography, The Fog on the Hill – How NSW Labor Lost its Way, that the Keneally-led NSW Government secretly planned to compensate Sydney University on the 'loss' of Callan Park by offering it the North Eveleigh site in Redfern, which had been prepared for tender. However, it was reported that the North Eveleigh site had been prepared for the market and was valued at about A$100 million. Cabinet had also approved the proceeds of the North Eveleigh sale to go towards a major upgrade of Redfern Station. Yet the university was only prepared to pay some $30 million, and so the 'deal' did not go ahead.

NSW Ambulance Headquarters and Education Centre moved into the site some time after 1994 (date unknown), and officially vacated in 2024, moving to Sydney Olympic Park.

Other tenants include Writing NSW, formerly the New South Wales Writers' Centre.

In November 2011, the Leichhardt Council and the Friends of Callan Park formally presented the Draft Callan Park Master Plan to the Minister for Planning and Infrastructure, Brad Hazzard MP. In 2015, the New South Wales Parliament approved the draft masterplan and agreed to establish a specialised trust, finalise the site's master plan and develop a sustainable long-term funding model to protect it. It was envisaged that the Callan Park and Broughton Hall Trust would manage the site, comprising the following trustees appointed by the Governor:

- an appointee to represent the traditional owners;
- three appointees on the recommendation of the Premier to represent the relevant NSW Government Ministers in relation to Heritage, Health and Environmental considerations;
- three appointees on the recommendation of relevant local Council area, at least 1 of who has expertise in heritage;
- an appointee to represent mental health consumers;
- an appointee from the local council area to represent the Friends of Callan Park;
- an appointee to represent educational/arts tenants/lessees;
- an appointee from the local council area to represent sporting bodies; and
- an appointee to represent not-for-profit organisations which are tenants/lessees.

The government did not proceed with these plans, and in 2015, the NSW Office of Environment and Heritage was delegated management of several precincts in Callan Park.

== Description ==
Rozelle Hospital site is 61 hectares of undulating waterfront parkland site, with complexes of buildings clustered across it, and diverse landscape elements and plantings. The site incorporates many layers of archaeological, Aboriginal, historic, cultural, aesthetic and environmental heritage.

It contains many heritage buildings, including two of the original houses (1839 and 1842) of the three original estates on which it is based: and the magnificent Kirkbride Block, completed in 1885 for the Callan Park Psychiatric Hospital, and now the campus of the Sydney College of the Arts.

=== Garry Owen House (now Writing NSW) ===
This, the first building on the site, c.1840, was built on a curved earth terrace projecting from the slope (the edge of the sandstone ridge where the land begins to fall away at the top of the slopes) with commanding views over Iron Cove. It was originally a grand private residence and prominent in Leichhardt society (1991 Heritage Study of Rozelle Hospital).

It retains some early estate and garden layout, showing the influence of English pattern books on laying out a garden – with axial approach to the front door with a carriage loop. Garryowen also retains some early plantings, such as an old (1.5m trunk girth) evergreen or Southern magnolia /bull bay, (M.grandiflora) and a Camellia japonica cv. (double red with a fleck of white) west of the house's main garden front (western side) in front of Garry Owen Cottage (1880s, designed by Government Architect James Barnet for male convalescent patients. Four mature jacarandas (J.mimosifolia) and 3 cabbage tree palms (Livistona australis) and a cedar wattle (Acacia elata) are to Garryowen's north. A Cordyline stricta, Western Australian peppermint (Agonis flexuosa) and a hedge of Cape plumbago (P.capensis) are to the house's north-east. To the north are a Bunya pine (Araucaria bidwillii), 3 Bhutan cypresses (Cupressus torulosa) and a Norfolk Island hibiscus tree (Lagunaria patersonia. To the west are more jacaranda trees.

The house has two main front rooms (drawing room and dining room) accessed through sliding doors from a central hall, enabling the opening of both right up into a large single ballroom, similar to that of Government House (which Mortimer Lewis had implemented, overseeing the plans prepared by English architect, Edmund Blore. It shows Lewis' architectural trademarks, such as reeded, rather than fluted mouldings in the tops of window cases, floor skirtings are panelled, French doors onto the verandahs (onto the entrance front (north) and garden front (west) sides of the house (these doors were later changed by James Barnet to hung windows). The octagonal asphalt paving blocks on the verandah floors are a trademark of James Barnet, also seen at his Police & Justice Museum near Circular Quay and South West Rocks Lighthouse. The Library and another room are divided by sliding doors. A gardener's cottage has 6 rooms.

The original small cottage has been incorporated into the present mid-Victorian two storey building. Additions have been made to the east and south. The stair hall has a fine Neoclasical interior and domed ceiling, with stained glass inserts. There is a centrally placed entrance on the north elevation with elegant fanlight and classically detailed moulded entablature. It is constructed of rendered brick ashlar coursed single-storey verandah with timber supports and posts, corrugated iron roofed. The main roof is of galvanised iron, hidden behind the parapet. Extensive brick additions to the east which have been rendered and painted (1992, Preliminary Heritage & Conservation Register – Central District Area Health Service).

=== Garry Owen Cottage (1880s) ===
This was designed by Government Architect James Barnet for male convalescent patients is of sandstone, sited on the edge (west) of Garryowen's earth platform, and together with the group of Convalescent Cottages (zone 5) forms part of the deliberately composed picturesque setting for the Kirkbride Block. Also there is a small male attendant's cottage designed by Government Architect Walter Liberty Vernon in the zone.

=== Kirkbride Complex ===
The Kirkbride complex sits proud on a high ridge on the site to the north east of Garryowen's grounds. It is a magnificent sandstone complex of buildings and courtyards, surrounded by walls and has (hidden boundary lines behind 'sunk fences'). The complex was completed in 1885 for the government-run Callan Park Psychiatric Hospital. This complex has more recently been used by Sydney University as a campus of the Sydney College of the Arts.

== Heritage listing ==
On 2 April 2017 the area and buildings were listed on the New South Wales State Heritage Register with the following statement of significance:

The site as a whole has very high levels of social significance and has special associations for the local and broader community both as an open space resource and for its cultural and aesthetic value. Kirkbride Block is significant as the collaborative work of three prominent figures in the late 19th century, James Barnet, Charles Moore and Frederick Norton Manning, as the largest remaining mental institution in NSW and as the first to be designed as a curative and therapeutic environment. The landscape design and setting of Kirkbride is vital and paramount to the design and philosophy of 'moral therapy' treatment evidenced in the intimate design of courtyards through to the long vistas over the hospital grounds and surrounding country. The landscape cannot be separated from the buildings and performs an equal and active function in the creation of the therapeutic environment. It is highly significant that much of the original fabric, character and setting for this major Victorian period design remain intact within a highly developed inner city locality.

Callan Park House (former Garry Owen House), as an impressive early and mid-Victorian residence is one of the oldest remaining houses in the district. It has strong associations with the early history of the Rozelle area. It is an important visual landmark element within the hospital.

Rozelle Hospital grounds are of historic and social significance at a state level in their association with the establishment of two hospitals, Callan Park and Broughton Hall, demonstrating two major changes in mental health in NSW. These changes, and changing ideas in garden design, are reflected in the grounds. The grounds are of historic social significance in their evidence of patient involvement.

The grounds of the former Callan Park area of Rozelle Hospital are of historic significance on a national level as an integral element of the first hospital for the insane which was designed based on moral therapy principles and built in the one campaign. They are a direct application of the moral therapy principles of psychiatric care in the landscape. They are associated with: Dr Frederick Norton Manning, Inspector General for the Insane; James Barnet, Colonial Architect; and Charles Moore, Director of the then Botanic Gardens, Sydney.

— Statement of significance, New South Wales State Heritage Register.

The building was also listed on the (now defunct) Register of the National Estate.

=== In popular culture ===
- The site features in the 1996 Australian film Cosi.
- It features in the novel Jessica by Bryce Courtenay with the lead character committed to the asylum for four years.
- It is also the setting for Dorothy Porter's 1999 verse novel What a Piece of Work.
- The 2008 film The Last Confession of Alexander Pearce shot several scenes in the dungeons and tunnels of the old asylum. A gallows was erected in the grounds to film the execution of Alexander Pearce.
- The music video for Ricki-Lee's song "Crazy" was filmed at the hospital in 2012.
- The television series Love Child and Doctor Doctor, and the films Bliss and Ravenswood were filmed at the hospital.

=== Theft of antiques ===
A theft occurred in 2003 of thousands of medical antiques from the Callan Park Hospital for the Insane, including a human skeleton, medical and dental instruments, lithographs and furniture.

== Notable inmates and staff ==
=== Inmates ===
- J. F. Archibald, editor and publisher of The Bulletin, who published much writing by Henry Lawson.
- William James Chidley, sex reformer and eccentric, died at Callan Park 21 December 1916.
- Michael 'Tarzan' Fomenko (c.1930–2018), ocean rower and hermetic bushman
- Louisa Lawson, Australian suffragist, (mother of poet Henry Lawson) together with her sons, Charles and Peter.
- Bea Miles (1902–1973), eccentric and bohemian rebel.
- Charles Samuels (1863/1864–1912), diagnosed with Melancholia.
- Claude Webb-Wagg (1893–1945), theatre musician, music teacher and businessman.
- Francis Webb (1925–1973), poet and son of Claude Webb-Wagg.

=== Staff ===
- Lillian May Armfield (1884–1971), a pioneering Sydney police detective worked as a nurse at the Callan Park Hospital for the Insane (1907–1915), before embarking on her police career.
- Graeme Revell, noted film composer, was a nurse in the facility in the late 1970s.
- Craig Powell, (1940–2022), poet and psychiatrist.

== See also ==
- Carrington Hospital — an architecturally similar lunatic asylum in New Zealand that may have been designed by Barnet.
- Gladesville Mental Hospital
- Parramatta Female Factory
