= William James Chidley =

Australian philosopher (c.1860–1916)

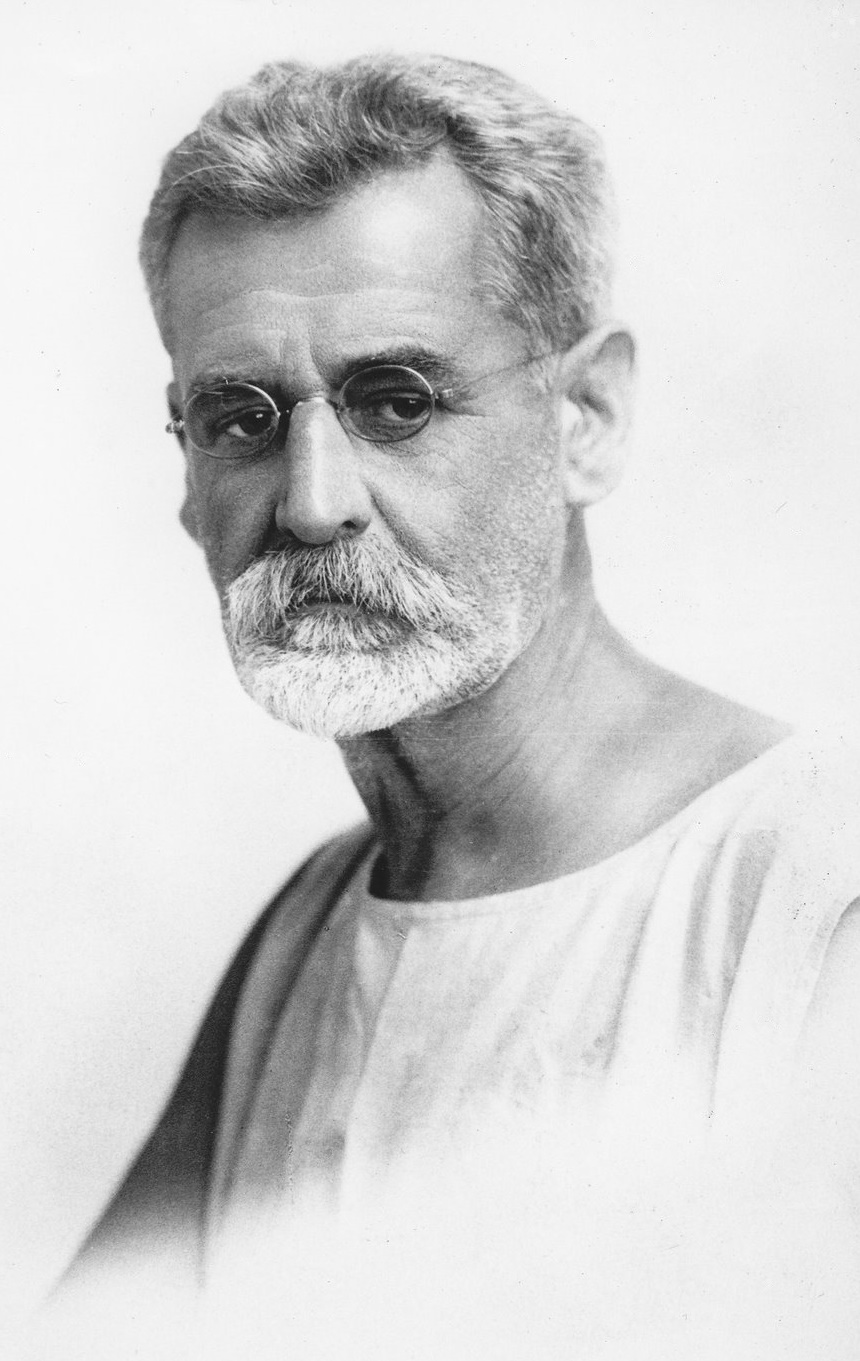
- Portrait of W. J. Chidley in about 1916.
- Born: c. 1860; Victoria
- Died: 21 December 1916; Callan Park Hospital for the Insane
- Occupations: writer; philosopher; public speaker

William James Chidley (c. 1860 – 21 December 1916) was an Australian sex reformer and eccentric who consistently advocated his unconventional theories on sex, diet and clothing. His book The Answer was first published in 1911 in Melbourne, explaining in detail the author's unconventional theories. After The Answer was declared an obscene publication in Victoria, Chidley moved to Sydney where he continued to address crowds and sell copies of his book, dressed in his characteristic knee-length tunic. In the following years he was the subject of frequent arrests for selling an obscene publication and using indecent language, and on several occasions declared to be insane and incarcerated in asylums. He died at the Callan Park asylum in December 1916.

== Biography ==
=== Early life ===
William James Chidley was born in Melbourne in about 1860 and was abandoned by his birth mother as an infant. He was adopted by John James Chidley, a toy warehouse proprietor, and his first wife Maria (née Carlin), who were living in Brunswick Street in Fitzroy, Melbourne. The Chidleys had emigrated from England, and after a period in the Victorian goldfields, settled in Melbourne. William was one of five children adopted by the couple. The other adopted children were a boy named Stanley and three girls, Ada, Ellen and Jane. Ellen and Jane were sisters by blood, the children of alcoholic parents who had both died in May 1854.^{[A]} William's adoptive parents were vegetarians and followers of the teachings of the Swedish philosopher Emanuel Swedenborg.

Soon after William's adoption, John and Maria Chidley returned to England with their adopted children. John Chidley engaged as a bookseller in London, but the business was unsuccessful. By about 1865 the Chidleys and their family returned to Australia. Upon their return the family moved itinerantly throughout Victoria, with Chidley's father operating a transportable photographic studio. At times Chidley remained in Melbourne as a school boarder. His final year of schooling was at St. Kilda College when he was aged thirteen.

=== Working life ===
After leaving school Chidley assisted his adoptive father for a period in his photographic studio, where he learned photography and developed a talent for drawing. He worked for a solicitor and was later apprenticed to an architect for four years. Chidley was not suited to office work, finding it tedious, and began working as an itinerant crayon and watercolour artist, drawing portraits for up to £10 each. He also continued his education by reading in public libraries.

In about 1880 Chidley moved to Adelaide where he worked as an artist. In October 1882 William J. Chidley and another man named Arthur Sadler, were arrested at Bridgewater, in the Adelaide Hills, for being involved in a quarrel in Waymouth Street in Adelaide, which resulted in the death of Thomas Maloney on October 10. Chidley and Sadler were charged with "feloniously and wilfully killing and slaying" Maloney. They were tried in the Adelaide Supreme Court in December 1882 and both men were acquitted of the charges.

After his acquittal Chidley joined the Byron Theatre Company, an Adelaide theatre group, where he met a young actress named Ada Grantleigh (née Harris), who was married to Walter Thoms. He and Ada formed an intermittent de facto relationship which lasted until Ada's death in 1908. The couple, both of whom suffered periods of alcoholism, lived at Adelaide until 1890, then in Sydney, New Zealand and Melbourne. Chidley and Ada Grantleigh never married but adopted a son (reputedly hers).^{[B]}

Chidley's adoptive father died in February 1891 at his home at Port Fairy North.

During the period 1894-5 Chidley was employed as a black-and-white artist by R. B. Orchard, a prominent Sydney jeweller, and A. H. Thompson, who owned a photographic business.

During his early working years Chidley had supported himself by drawing for medical texts. This exposed him to various contemporary medical theories about human sexuality and he formed the conviction that "there was something profoundly wrong with the way in which modern people had sex". He believed he had made an important scientific discovery that the human race had been living in error.

Chidley wrote his autobiography, although he did not intend it to be widely read until after his death. In 1899 he sent a duplicate of the manuscript to Havelock Ellis, the English physician and writer on human sexuality, who used extracts in his Studies in the Psychology of Sex.

Ada Grantleigh (Thoms) died on 1 December 1908 at Melbourne Hospital, aged 48.

=== The Answer ===
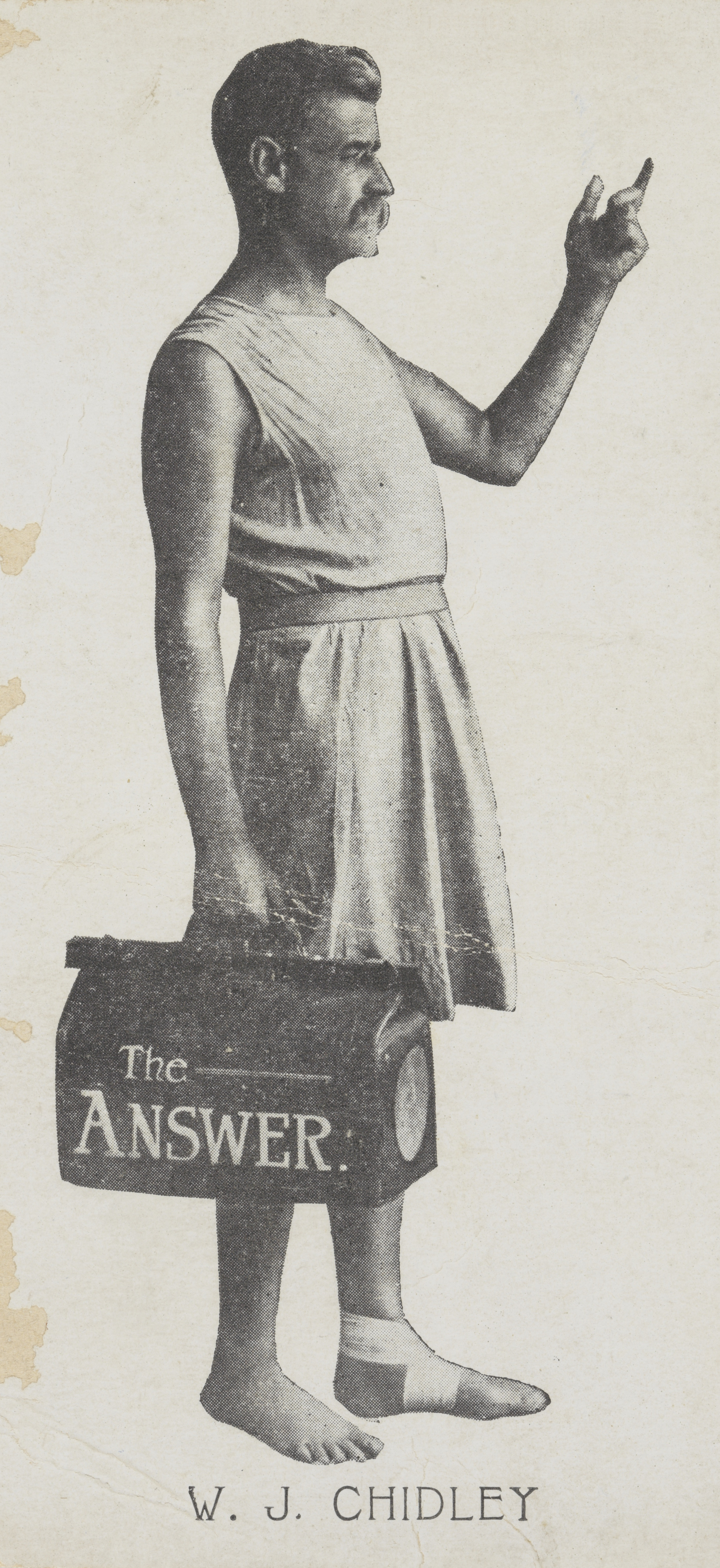
Portrait of William James Chidley.

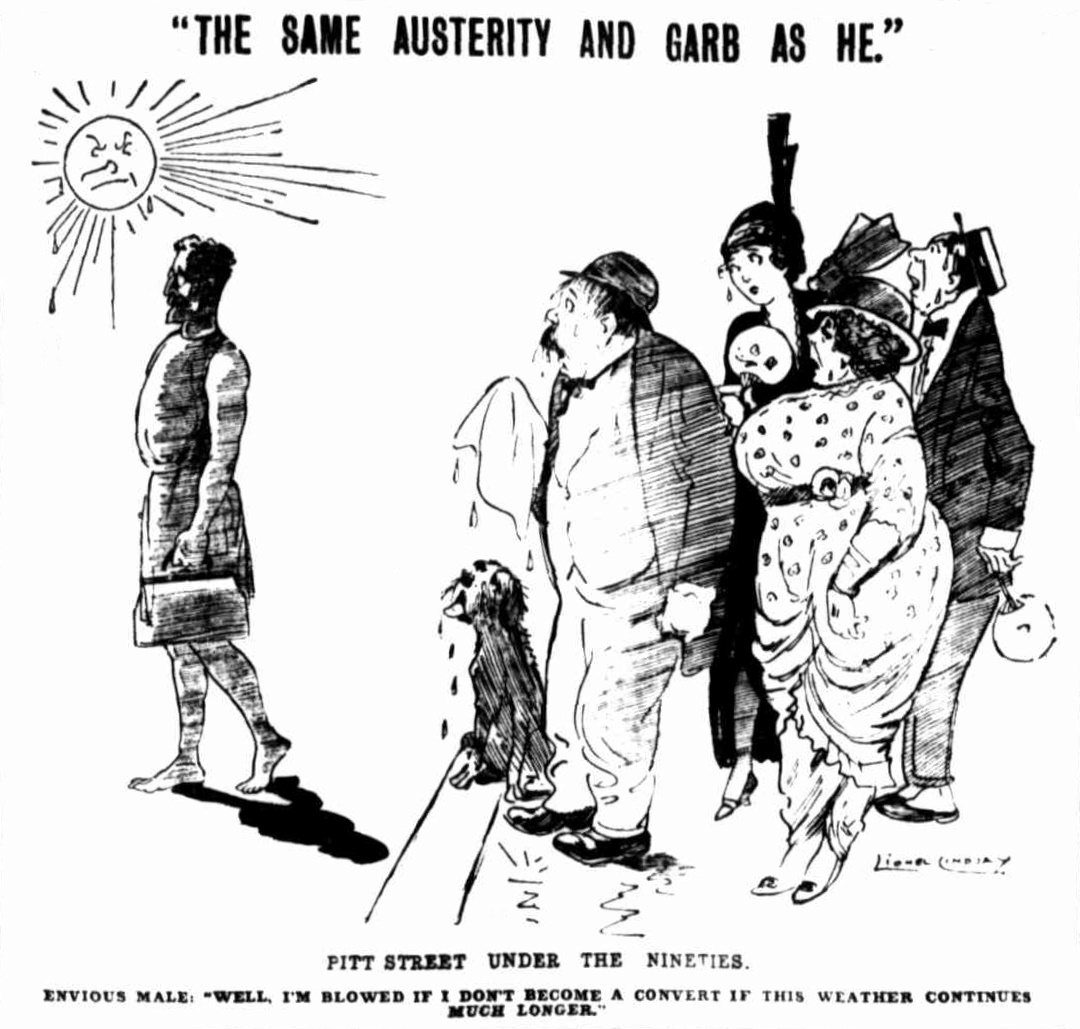
A cartoon featuring W. J. Chidley by Lionel Lindsay, published in The Evening News, 10 February 1914.

In April 1911 the Australasian Authors' Agency, a Melbourne-based publisher established by Henry Hyde Champion, released The Answer by William J. Chidley. The book explained in detail the author's unconventional theories, including a call for dress reform and a diet of nuts and raw fruit. In regard to sex Chidley wrote: "The world will be saved by true lovers who consummate their marriage in the natural way described in this book". His writings called for a different mode of sexual intercourse, by which the flaccid or semi-erect penis was sucked into the vagina (rather than the "forcible entrance" of the erect penis, which he likened to a "crowbar"). Adelaide's The Register newspaper commented that Chidley's "main theory and the arguments in support could be discussed in medical journals only, and these will not open their columns to him". To a quote from The Answer – "The habit lovers now have of kissing with their clothes on is very injurious to health" – the review in The Register added: "And the rest must – in newspaper columns – be silence".

In Sydney in May 1911 Chidley was arrested in George Street, charged with "having behaved in an offensive manner". He was dressed in what became his characteristic mode, a Grecian-style knee-length tunic, bare-headed and barefoot or wearing sandals, carrying his carpet-bag with 'The Answer' printed upon it (described as "like the regulation bathing costume, with legs and arms bare", with placards reading "The answer" attached to his chest and back). Chidley was brought before a magistrate of the Water Police Court where he claimed to be "the author of a book which was of supreme importance to the human race... published in the interests of humanity". When asked by the magistrate "Why do you parade yourself in such a style?", he answered: "Because it lets the sun and air to the skin", adding "if people adopted 'the simple life' they would live until they were 130 years of age". The magistrate concluded: "This is evidently the act of a faddist". He fined Chidley five shillings, or "six hours in the cells".

By June 1911 Chidley's The Answer ("The solution of the Sex Question") was being advertised as being sold at Cole's Book Arcade in Melbourne and Sydney and Dymocks' bookstore in Sydney. In late September 1911 in Melbourne a police detective purchased two copies of The Answer from Chidley. He then obtained search warrants and confiscated a further seven copies from Chidley and fifteen copies of the work from Cole's bookstore in Bourke Street. The detective also attended the offices of the publisher, Henry Hyde Champion, at Whitehall Chambers in Bank Place, and seized a further 262 copies of The Answer. On 7 October a series of prosecutions was commenced before a bench of magistrates, the members of which declared the book to be obscene, having "decided that there were many parts of it which would tend to deprave and corrupt the morals of any person reading it". An order was made for the destruction of the impounded books after thirty days had elapsed.

By January 1912 the second edition of The Answer was being advertised for sale, directly from an address in Mackenzie Street, Melbourne. With The Answer declared in Victoria to be an obscene publication, and copies subject to confiscation and destruction, Chidley moved to Sydney in early 1912 where the book had not been banned. In March 1912 Chidley was charged with "behaving in an offensive manner" in the Domain, Sydney's 'speakers' corner', where he been addressing a large crowd, reading from his book and talking on a variety of subjects. He was brought before a magistrate who imposed a fine of five pounds, or alternatively two months' hard labour. In May 1912 Chidley was again charged with "behaving in an offensive manner" after he had been addressing a crowd of about eight hundred on a Sunday afternoon at the Domain. The magistrate imposed a fine of twenty shillings and ordered that two sureties of thirty pounds be entered into for Chidley to be of good behaviour for twelve months.

=== Committals ===
On the evening of 24 July 1912 Chidley presented "an illustrated lecture" for "men only" at a hall in Phillip Street, Sydney, on the subject of "Degeneracy: The Cause and Cure".

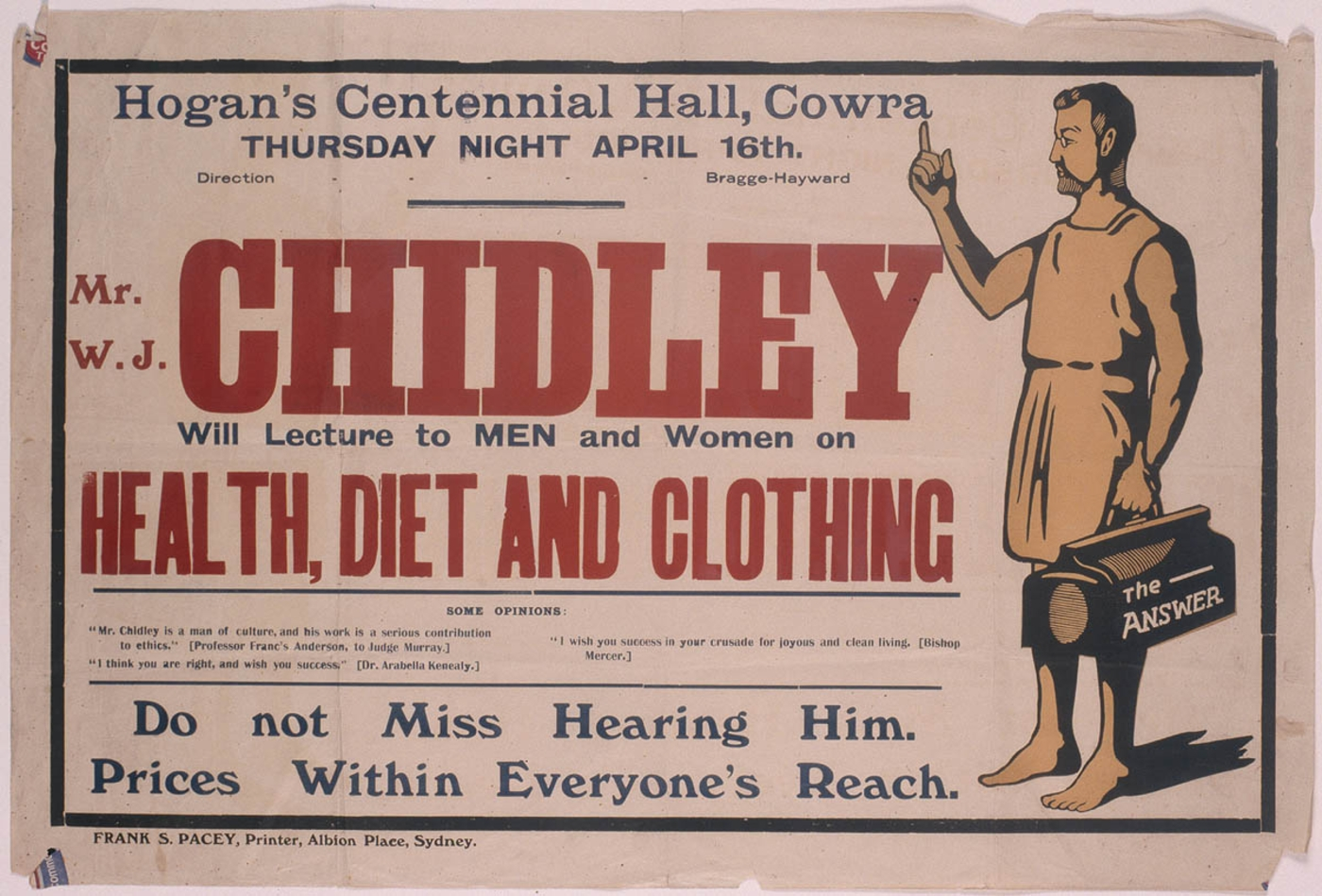
Advertisement for a public lecture at Cowra on 16 April 1914.

Chidley was intending to deliver a lecture to women on Saturday, 3 August 1912, but earlier on that same day he was arrested and admitted to the Reception House for the Insane at Darlinghurst "for medical observation", where he was examined by two doctors who determined he was insane. One of those, Dr. Chisholm Ross, later stated that he based his assessment solely upon the contents of Chidley's book, The Answer. Dr. Ross told a reporter for The Sun: "Any man who writes nonsense of the kind found in his book... would lead me to the conclusion that he is insane". Apparently speaking on behalf of the whole medical community, Ross said "if we think he is insane that is a matter for us", adding: "That is what we are there for". A letter from 'Fair Play', published in The Sun, described Chidley as "an educated man, with a courteous manner, and a sound belief in fresh air... who has been subjected to ridicule and abuse, simply because he follows his open-air theory in dress and living". The writer added: "To anyone who has conversed with him or heard him speaking, it comes as a surprise... to learn he has been arrested for insanity!".

On 7 August Chidley was brought before the Lunacy Court in Darlinghurst and committed to the Callan Park Hospital for the Insane. A fund to obtain legal assistance for Chidley was established, with contributions to be forwarded to the office of The Sun newspaper. A public meeting was held at Sydney Town Hall on 19 August, to which "all lovers of fair play" were invited in order to "consider the case of W. J. Chidley". One of the convenors of the meeting was his previous employer R. B. Orchard. By the end of August the New South Wales Premier James McGowen had agreed to appoint a board of independent medical experts to report upon Chidley's mental state.

His case led to public debate regarding the use of the law to confine individuals in asylums, and he received public support from those who viewed him as an eccentric or crank deprived of his liberty and freedom of speech.

On 1 October 1912 Chidley was released from Callan Park under a statute which allowed the discharge of a mental hospital patient under the care of friends "who will guarantee the quietness of his conduct". The guarantors for Chidley's release were R. B. Orchard and A. H. Thompson, who had obtained an undertaking from Chidley "that he will not continue the expounding of his theories in public places, and will not walk through the streets in his 'simple-life' costume". In November 1912 three Sydney booksellers were summoned at the Central Court to answer charges that they had "sold an obscene publication", namely The Answer by W. J. Chidley.

From about August 1913 Chidley lived "in a respectable lodging-house" in Crown Street, Woolloomooloo, near the Domain.

On 26 December 1913 Chidley was arrested while addressing a crowd at the Domain. He was taken by police to Woolloomooloo police station and charged with lunacy, after which he was escorted to the Reception House at Darlinghurst. A meeting was held at the Domain two days later "at which speakers both men and women expressed indignation at the incarceration" of Chidley. By the close of the meeting a petition calling for his release had been "signed by over 1000 citizens". On the following day Chidley was brought before the Lunacy Court and "remanded for a week for observation". However two days later on Wednesday, 31 December, Chidley appeared before another magistrate and was released from custody.

=== Suppression ===
In February 1914 Chidley was convicted of selling an obscene publication. He was sentenced by a magistrate to two months' imprisonment ("the sentence to be suspended upon certain recognisances being entered into") and his copies of The Answer were ordered to be forfeited and destroyed. Chidley appealed against the conviction, which was heard by a full sitting of the Supreme Court in early April 1914. Despite a dissenting opinion by the Chief Justice, the court upheld the magistrate's decision. When the decision was announced Chidley, seated at the back of the court, rose and shouted: "It is an attack upon the liberty of thought and speech". He was then conducted from the court by an official.

On Thursday evening, 16 April 1914, Chidley delivered a lecture "to a very small audience" in Hogan's Centennial Hall at Cowra, in the Central West region of New South Wales. The local newspaper attributed the small attendance to unfavourable weather conditions and "the lack of publicity given to the lecture". Chidley had earlier "caused a sensation when he appeared in the streets in his rather meagre attire".

In July 1915 Chidley was charged with using indecent language and was brought before a magistrate at the Central Police Court. The police claimed that while addressing a crowd of about 400 men, women and children, the defendant had "used the words complained of when propounding a theory". In his defence Chidley denied using the words, and explained "he had been fined twice last month on being convicted on similar charges, and was careful that he did not give the police cause to complain". Witnesses called by Chidley also denied the words were used. Despite this the magistrate convicted the defendant of using indecent language and fined him five pounds, or in default two months' imprisonment, to which Chidley replied "that it was his intention to go to gaol".

In four years that Chidley was living in Sydney, from early 1912 to early 1916, he was prosecuted eighteen times and on three occasions served short prison sentences.

Chidley continued to address crowds at the Domain. In late January the police obtained "a search warrant for obscene publications" and seized about 1,700 copies of The Answer from his lodgings in Crown Street, Woolloomooloo. Shortly afterwards Chidley was detained in George Street and taken to a police station and "deemed to be insane" and "wandering at large". An inquiry "respecting the sanity" of Chidley commenced on 10 February 1916 at the Reception House in Darlinghurst. On the first day three doctors gave evidence, two of whom declared Chidley to be insane. The third doctor testified that he had examined Chidley "and thought that he was a normally sane man". The next day Chidley himself was examined, "garbed in his well-known neck-to-knee-costume". He explained that there had been five editions printed of his book and, as newspapers would not accept his advertisements, "the only way he had of selling his book was to go round the streets in the costume". On 16 February the stipendiary magistrate, James McKensey, delivered his judgement that Chidley was insane and ordered his removal to the Kenmore Hospital for the Insane at Goulburn.

On 3 March 1916, at a meeting held in the I.O.O.F. Temple in Elizabeth Street, a defence committee was formed by Chidley's supporters in protest against his incarceration in an asylum.

While at the Kenmore Hospital Chidley applied to be discharged under the provisions of section 99 of the Lunacy Act (1898). In June 1916, after a long hearing in the Lunacy Court Mr. Justice Harvey delivered his judgement that Chidley was "not of sound mind", describing him as "a typical paranoic – a man obsessed with one idea, and that idea a delusion". Justice Harvey recommended that Chidley be allowed to go free as long as some way could be found that protected the public from "the unreasonable propagation of his gospel" and restricting it to "those earnest persons of both sexes who regard Mr. Chidley as an acute thinker and reliable observer". The judge called upon "that body of sympathisers who have supported him in the past" to consider a plan by which Chidley's freedom "may be made compatible with the preservation of those standards of general public decency which the present conditions of society require".

In August 1916 Chidley was released under condition proposed by the Chidley Defence Committee. The principal condition stipulated that Chidley did not deliver lectures or addresses "in the streets or public parks". He was permitted to address only adults in a public hall, for which he was required to give twenty-four hours' notice of his intention to hold such an event. Two members of the committee paid bonds of fifty pounds each, subject to Chidley observing these conditions for twelve months.

=== Death ===
On 23 September 1916 Chidley was arrested at his home in Crown Street. The police claimed that he had broken the terms of his bond by delivering an address in the Domain a few days previously.

Chidley attempted suicide on 12 October 1916 when, while being lodged at the Reception House in Darlinghurst, he poured kerosene on himself and set fire to his clothes, as a result of which he received severe burns to his body. He was transferred to the Callan Park insane asylum on October 17 and admitted to the hospital ward.

After several months at the Callan Park asylum Chidley had recovered from his burns "and even showed certain mental improvement". At about midday on 21 December 1916 he was walking on the hospital verandah when he suddenly collapsed. In a state of unconsciousness Chidley was removed to the hospital ward where he died after ten minutes. An inquest into Chidley's death heard evidence that the cause may have been either arteriosclerosis or heart failure. In the end the coroner returned a verdict that Chidley had "died from natural causes".

=== Aftermath ===
After Chidley's death a group of his supporters banded together to form a "Chidleian Community" in a large old house at Berry's Bay, on the north side of Sydney Harbour, led by John Shirlaw, a journalist and an admirer of Chidley. The group engaged in nude sunbathing and tending a vegetable garden, but were "continually bothered by sightseers". After a few years the community foundered.

Public concerns about asylum policies in New South Wales increased after Chidley's death. In 1921 a state branch of the Lunacy Reform League was formed, which eventually led to pressure upon the government to hold a public inquiry. A Royal Commission to inquire into the administration of the lunacy laws in New South Wales held its first public sitting in January 1923. The report from the Royal Commission was published in August 1923. Its recommendations included solutions for overcrowding and calling for "scientific and humane" care and treatment of patients in accord with "modern and enlightened conceptions of the treatment of mental cases".

In 1935 Havelock Ellis sent the manuscript of Chidley's autobiography to the Mitchell Library, Sydney. Ellis remarked: "Not only is it a document of much psychological interest, but as a picture of the intimate aspects of Australian life in the nineteenth century it is of the highest interest, and that value will go on increasing as time passes".

== Cultural resonances ==
George Hutchinson wrote the two-act play No Room for Dreamers which was a reconstruction of Chidley's life, described as "a sad, comic tale of a bourgeois society with no place for the idealist".

During 1980 the play No Room for Dreamers, written and directed by George Hutchinson, had a successful run in Sydney. The play was a reconstruction of Chidley's life carried out (in the words of one reviewer) "with considerable licence". In spite of its attempt to place Chidley in an Australian historical context, the play "abstracted the sex reformer from his social milieu, to present his as an eccentric figure, out of place and out of time".

== Publications ==
- The Answer or the World as Joy: An Essay on Philosophy (1915)
- The Confessions of William James Chidley (1977), edited by Sally McInerney

== Notes ==
A.In May 1854 William Sherry and his wife Margaret both died on the same day in their Collingwood flat, due to "congestion of the brain produced by constant intoxication". The couple had five children, three boys and two girls, aged from two to eleven. The two orphaned girls, Ellen and Jane were aged five and two. Maria Chidley, who lived with her husband in nearby Brunswick Street, had attempted to feed and clothe the two girls as the parents were "on the last stages of their path to self-destruction". Maria had previously lost her own child, and "formed a strong attachment to the girls". The Sherry children had been baptised as Catholics and in July 1854 Father Gerald Archbold Ward, a priest at St. Francis' church in Melbourne, was appointed guardian of the two girls. Maria Chidley then approached Ward and "begged him not to take the girls from her". The Chidleys were Protestants (possibly Presbyterian). Despite his sectarian concerns Ward relented and, as he later claimed, allowed her to retain them for a three month trial period on the condition they were brought to him once a week. Whatever arrangements had been made eventually descended into sectarian rancour. In September 1855 Ward applied to the Supreme Court of Victoria for custody of the two girls. Ward described Mrs. Chidley as a "sanctimonious lady" who was "twisting" the minds of the children "whilst plying them with gifts". ... In October 1855 in the Supreme Court of Victoria John and Maria Chidley were appointed guardians of Ellen and Jane Sherry, described as "female infants". Both children had been living with the couple prior to the court order. The two children had previously been under the guardianship of the Catholic priest Father Gerald Archbold Ward.

B.Ada Grantleigh was born in about 1860, the daughter of John Harris, a furniture dealer. In 1878 she married Walter Thoms, a violent man from whom she separated soon afterwards. She adopted the stage name 'Grantleigh' and made her living as a theatre actress. Ada remained legally married to Thoms until her death in 1908.
