= Writing NSW =

Writers' organisation in Australia

- Formation: May 1991; 35 years ago
- Purpose: Promote writing-based culture and the rights and interests of writers in NSW
- Headquarters: Garry Owen House, Callan Park, New South Wales, Australia
- Members: 2000 (2018)
- Chair: Jane Pochon
- CEO: Jane McCredie
- Website: writingnsw.org.au

Writing NSW, formerly known as New South Wales Writers' Centre and WritersNSW, is a provider of services to writers, including courses, seminars and workshops, writing groups, festivals and events, grants and prizes, and information and advice. It operates as a not-for-profit organisation and has provided support to the writers in NSW since 1991.

Writing NSW is managed by chief executive officer Jane McCredie. The director and staff are responsible to a management committee elected by organisation members. As of 2018 there were approximately 2,000 members.

The program of activities offered by Writing NSW includes workshops, seminars, festivals, grants and competitions, as well as mentorships, leveraging opportunities for emerging writers and suggesting pathways to publication. It is the peak body for writers in the state of New South Wales.

Writing NSW occupies Garry Owen House, a restored Georgian mansion set in the grounds of Callan Park. The office is open from Monday to Friday 9:00 am to 5:00 pm and Saturday 9:00 am to 1:00 pm.

The change of name from the New South Wales Writers' Centre took place in 2018.
