= Callan Park =

Heritage-listed area within Lilyfield, New South Wales, Australia

Coordinates: 33°51′55″S 151°09′46″E

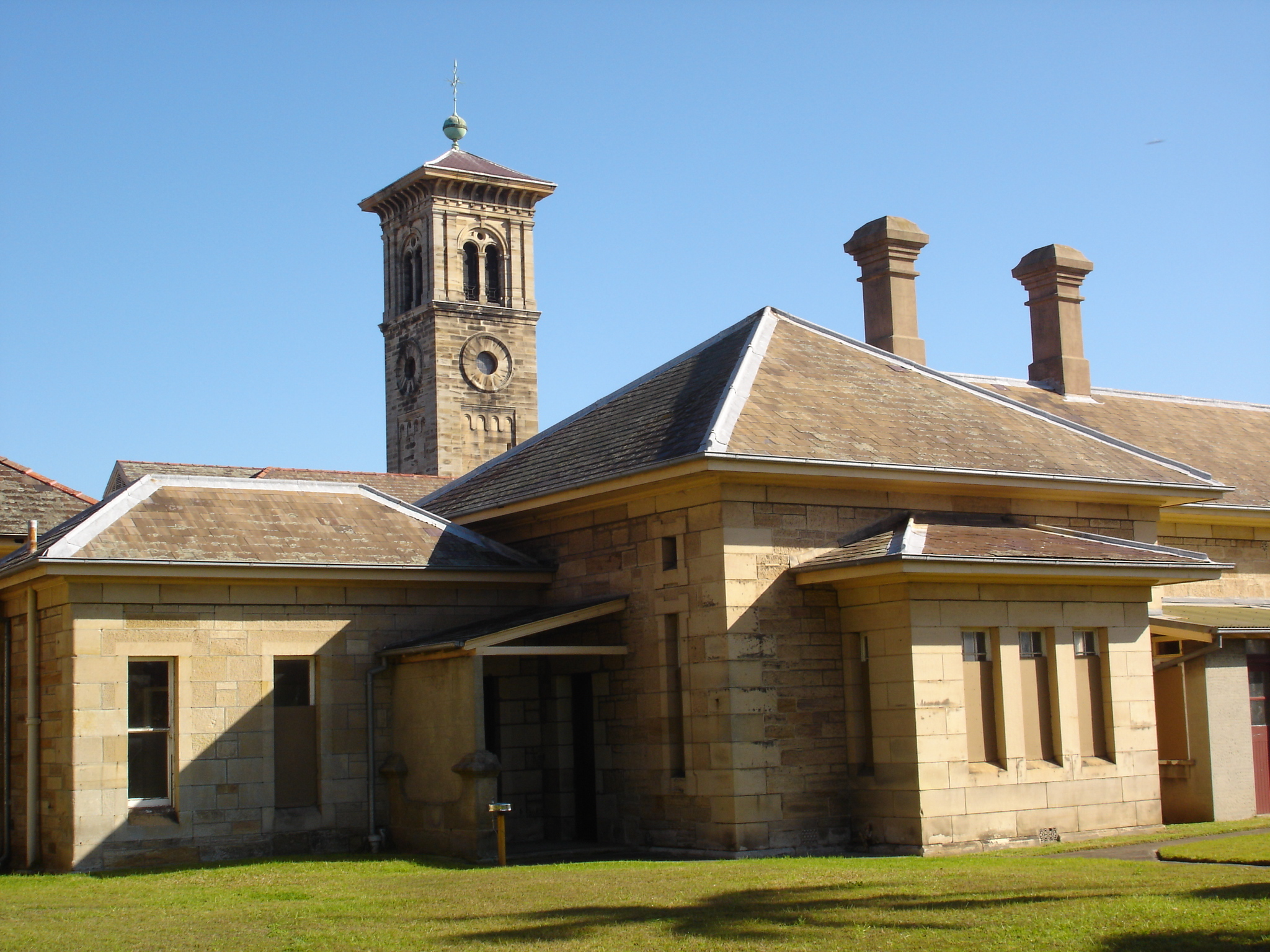
Callan Park buildings

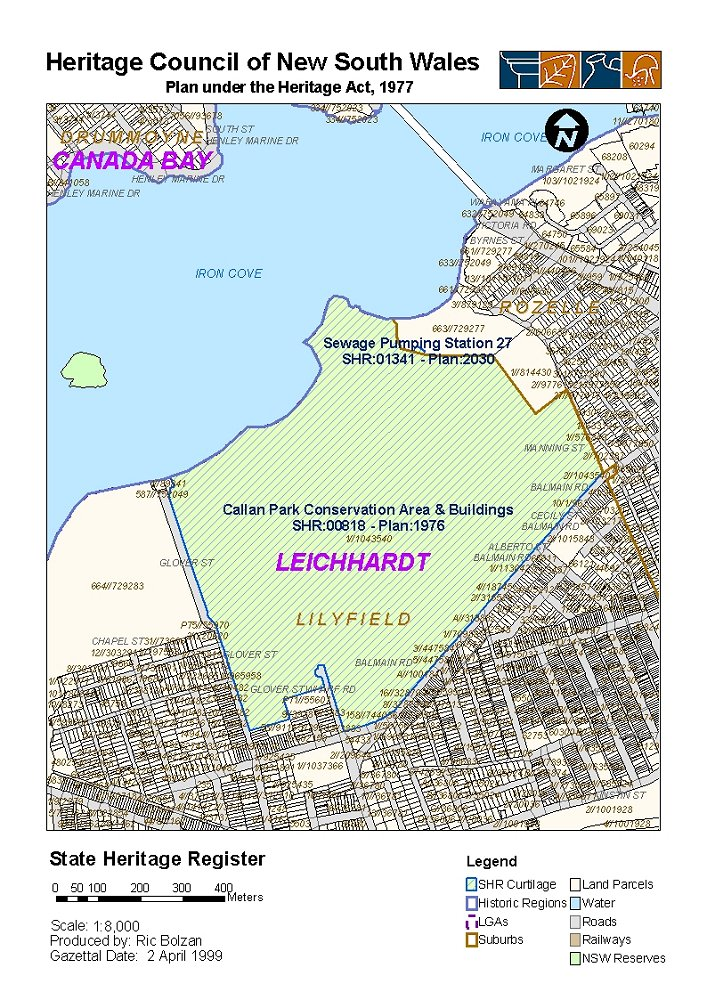
Callan Park Conservation Area, State Heritage Register Plan, 1976 (5051544b8)

Callan Park, with the heritage listed name Callan Park Conservation Area & Buildings, is a 60-hectare (150-acre) heritage listed site in Lilyfield, a suburb in Sydney's Inner West in New South Wales, Australia.

Callan Park is located in the suburb of Lilyfield on the border with Rozelle to the east. It is situated next to Iron Cove on the northern side. The NSW Department of Planning & Environment manages a large part of the site on behalf of Health Administration Corporation, a division of NSW Health; with the other precincts managed by the NSW Ambulance and the Sydney Local Health District.

The popular Bay Run runs through the park along the foreshore of Iron Cove.

== History ==
In 1839, Crown Solicitor and Police Magistrate John Ryan Brenan made a series of purchases to acquire the Callan Park land, which he named Garry Owen Estate. Brenan built a house on the land overlooking the Parramatta River, which he named Garry Owen house, and this was a local centre for social life until his bankruptcy in 1864. The land was purchased by Sydney businessman John Gordon who renamed the property Callan Park and subdivided the land ready for auction as a new waterfront suburb.

The entire area was purchased by the Colonial Government as a site for a new lunatic asylum. The main complex was completed in 1885 and continued to be used for patients until 1994. Sydney College of the Arts took possession of the building in 1996. The precinct, including several individual buildings and historic rock carvings were listed on the NSW State Heritage Register in July 2008.

In 1918, the Government of New South Wales purchased the house and land of Broughton Hall, Lilyfield, adjacent to the original "Callan Park" property. It was used as an army hospital during World War I.

On 19 July 2011, Leichhardt Council (now Inner West Council) approved the Callan Park Master Plan, the Callan Park Conservation Management Plan and the Callan Park Plan of Management. The plans were submitted to the New South Wales State Government on 11 November 2011.

In 2017, the Inner West Council called for "the long awaited adoption of its award-winning Callan Park Master Plan more than five years after it was first handed over to the State Government." The former mayor of the council, Darcy Byrne, stated that the onus was on the State Government to act "before the erosion of facilities within Callan Park pass the point of no return." He also stated that "with Sydney University vacating the Kirkbride complex local people will rightly be concerned that those magnificent sandstone buildings are about to become derelict."

In 2020, Sydney College of the Arts (SCA) moved from Callan Park to the main campus of Sydney University, taking up residence in the Old Teachers College building.

In 2026, demolition of 9 run-down buildings in Callan Park begun. The project would result in 1.6 hectares of new public space. Kobi Shetty supported the development.

Callan Park was used as a primary location for the fictional colony 'Port Victory' in the 2023 period TV drama The Artful Dodger.

== Callan Park Hospital for the Insane ==
The area was originally a private residence until it was purchased by the Colonial Government and transformed into a psychiatric hospital, known until 1914 as the Callan Park Hospital for the Insane. The facility remained in use until 1994 when it was relocated to new buildings on the site. After a period of extensive renovation, the Kirkbride Complex which housed the former hospital, was occupied by the Sydney College of the Arts.

== Broughton Hall ==
Broughton Hall is a heritage-listed former residence, convalescent hospital and psychiatric clinic situated in Callan Park, The house, Broughton House or Broughton Hall, was built c. 1841 and variously served as a residence for prominent businessmen and public figures (1841–1914). It is situated within the Callan Park Conservation Area, in Church Street, Lilyfield, near the corner of Wharf Road. It was used as No. 13 Australian Army Hospital during World War I. Other buildings were constructed over time and the precinct was used as the Broughton Hall Psychiatric Clinic (1921–1976). It was merged into Rozelle Hospital along with the adjacent Callan Park Hospital for the Insane in 1976, during which time it became the first premises for the Rivendell Child, Adolescent and Family Unit. Broughton House fell into disuse, suffering severe damage from fire and vandalism.

== Gallery ==
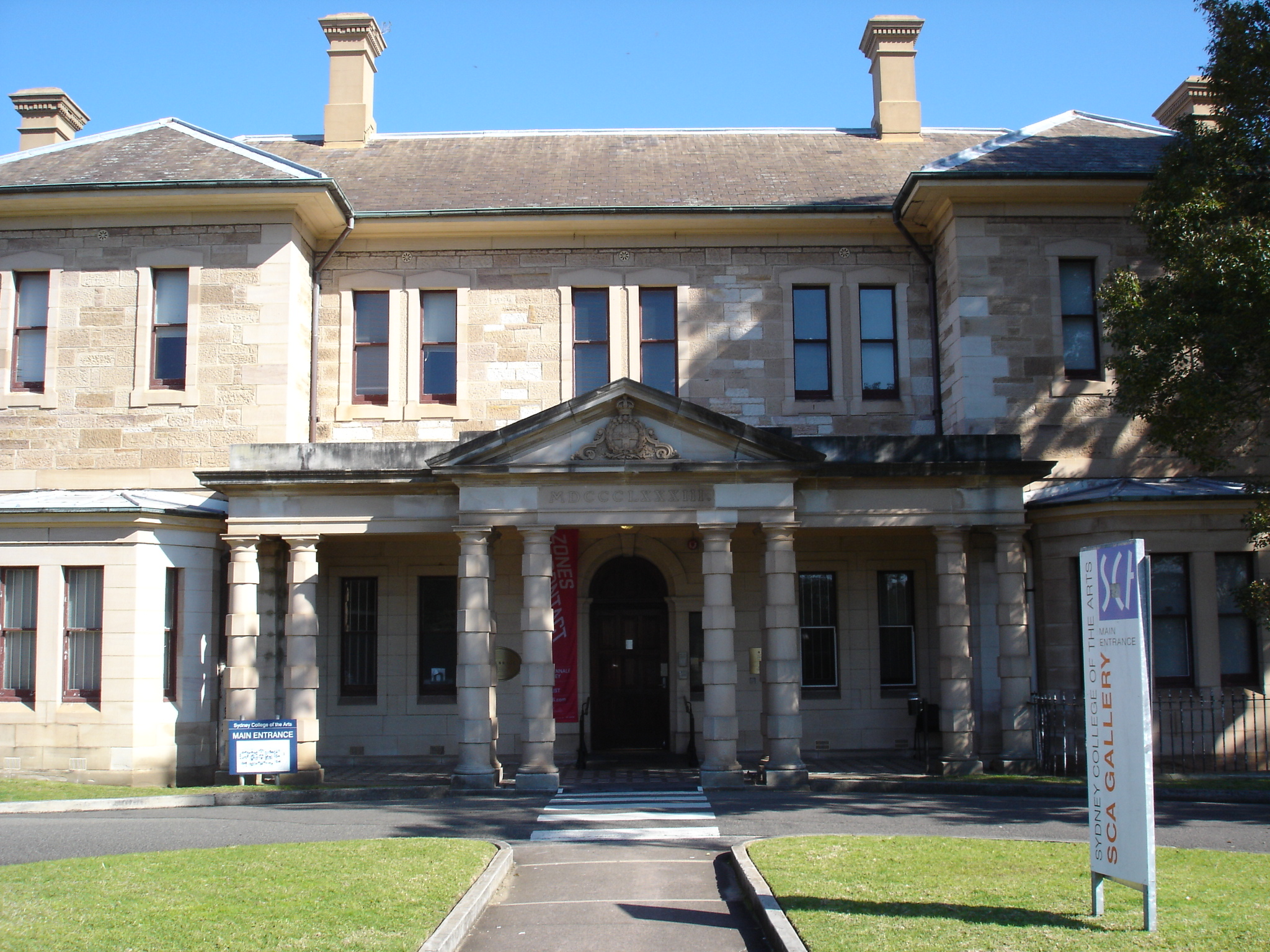
Callan Park

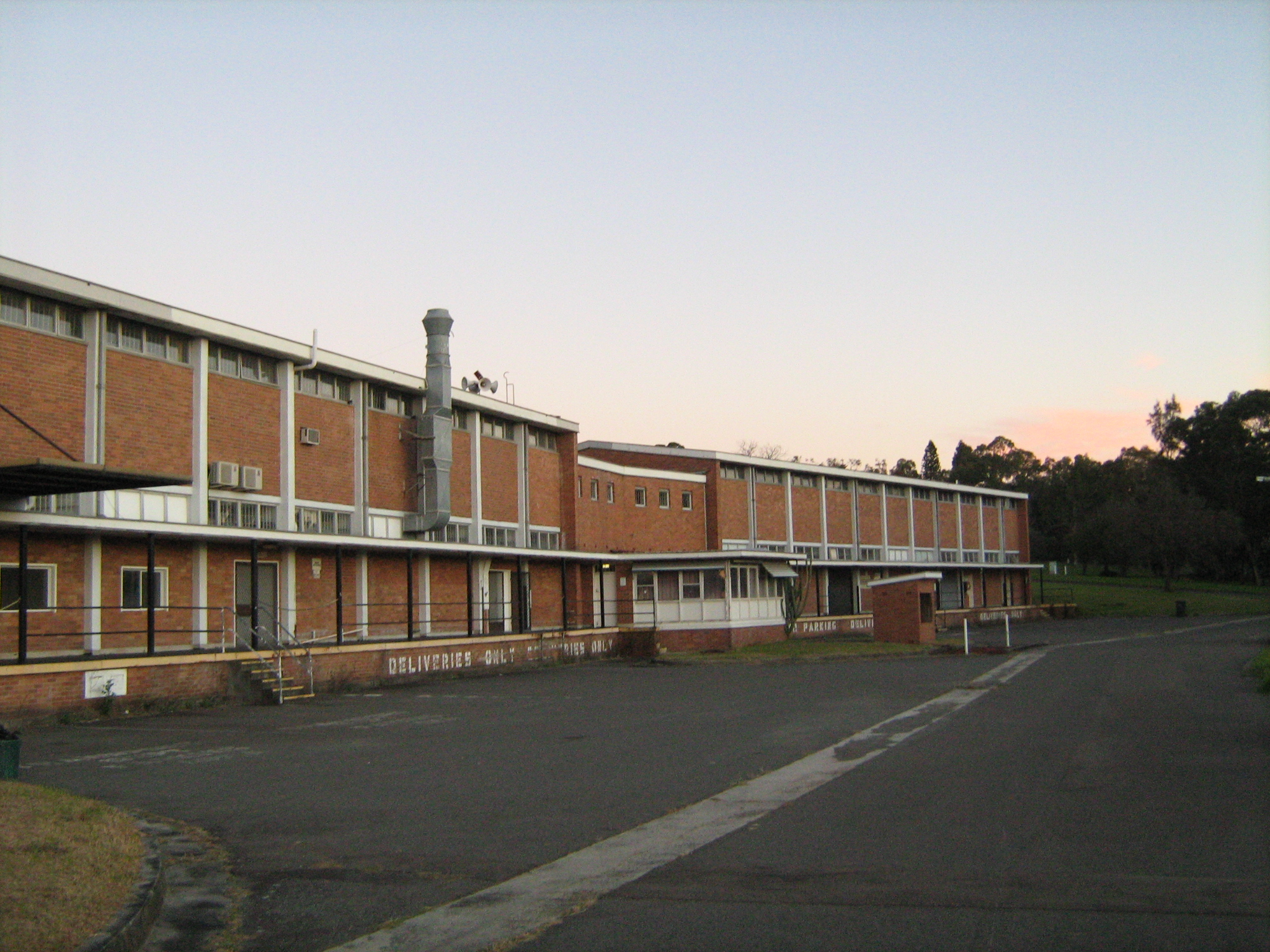
Former Rozelle Hospital building

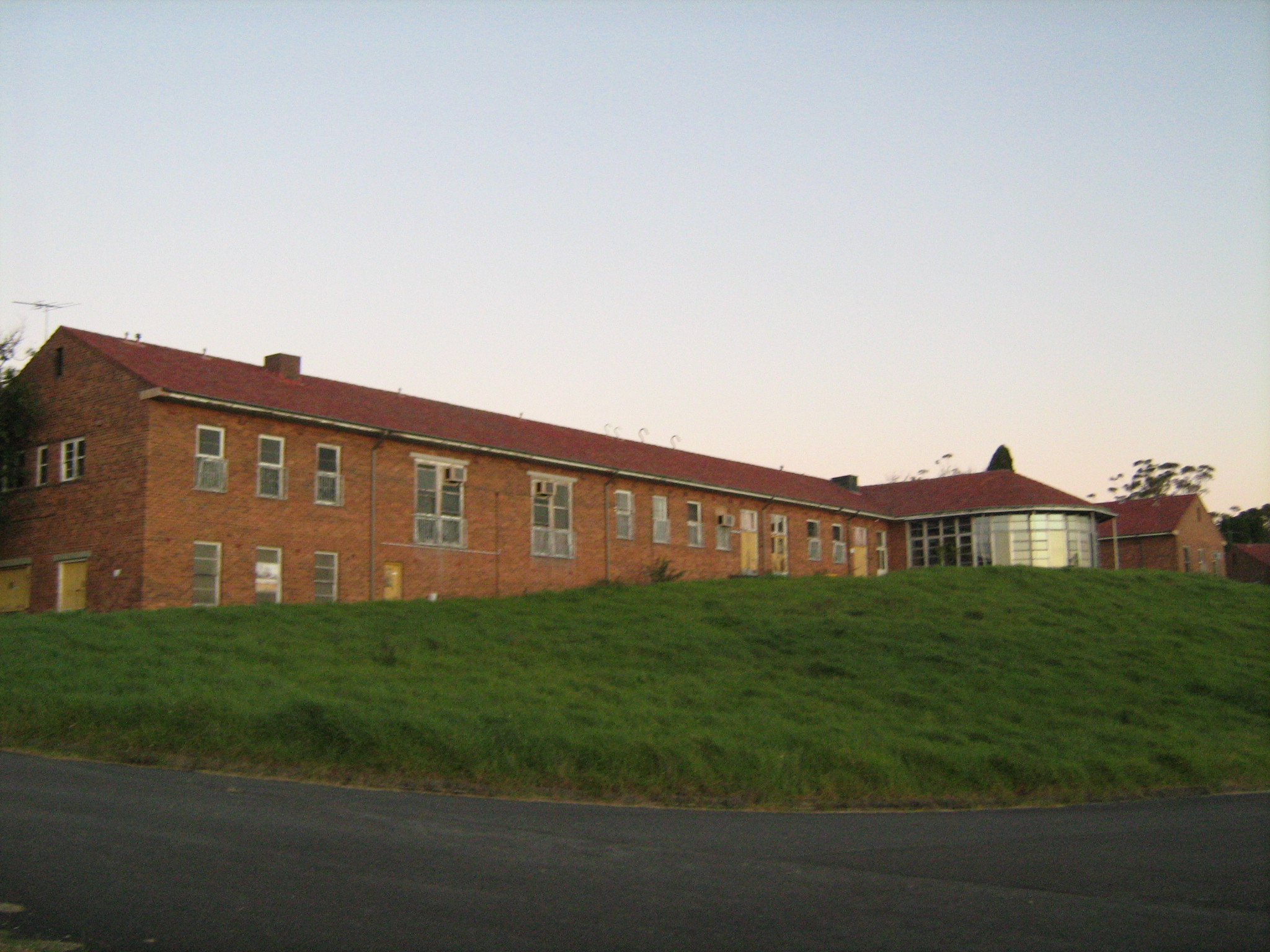
Former Rozelle Hospital building

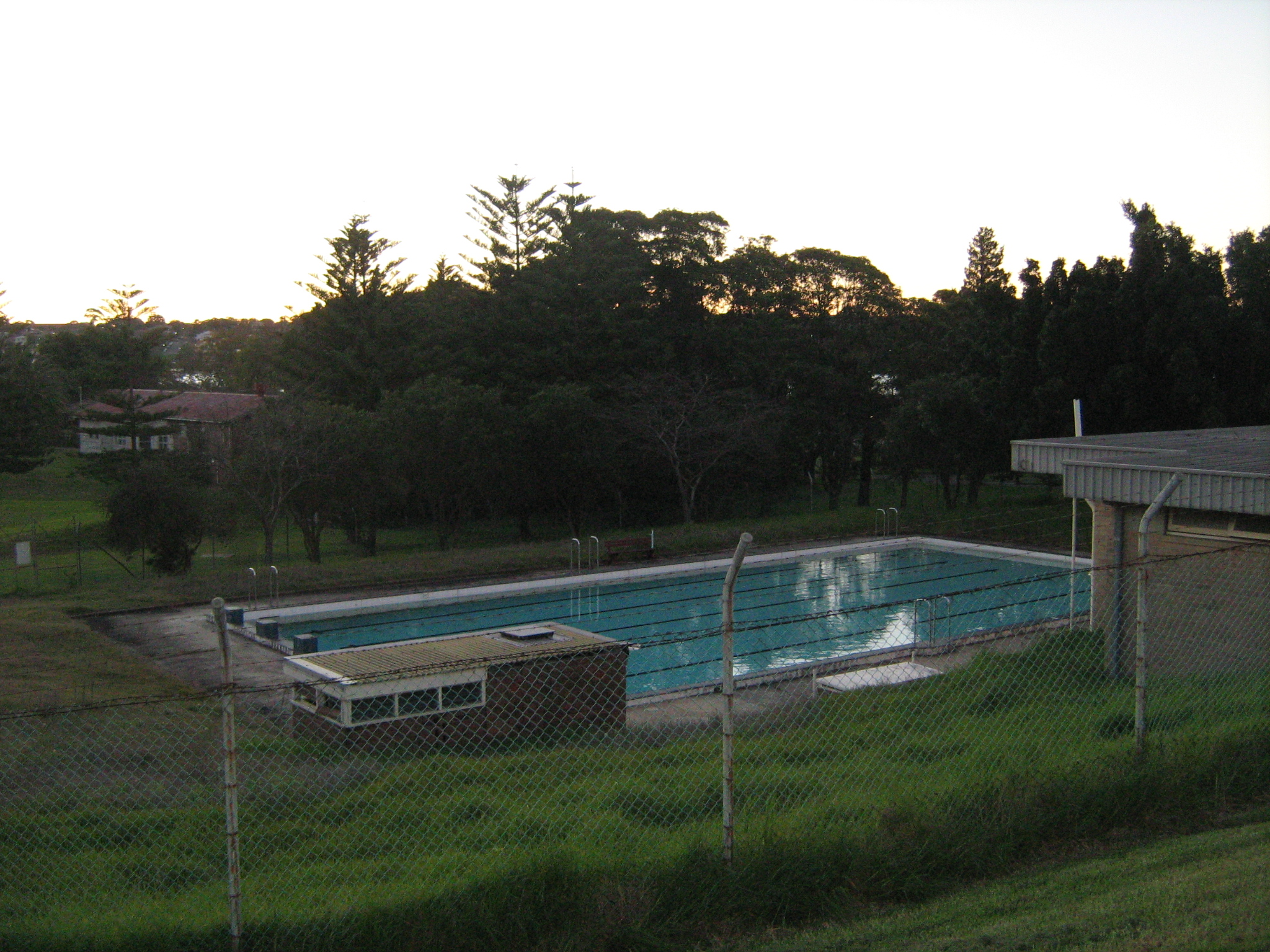
Rozelle Hospital swimming pool within Callan Park

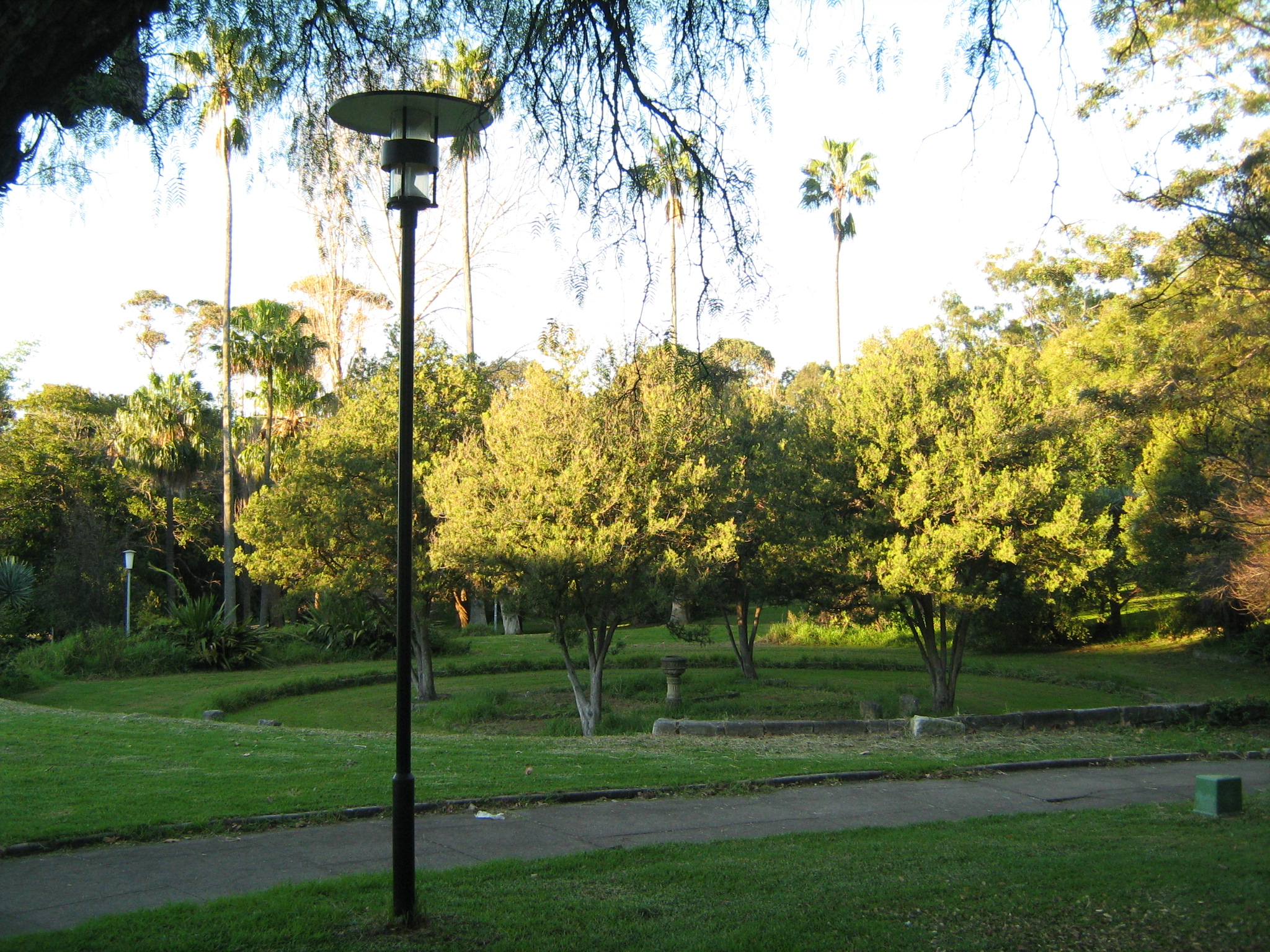
Garden in Callan Park near the Kirkbride Complex buildings

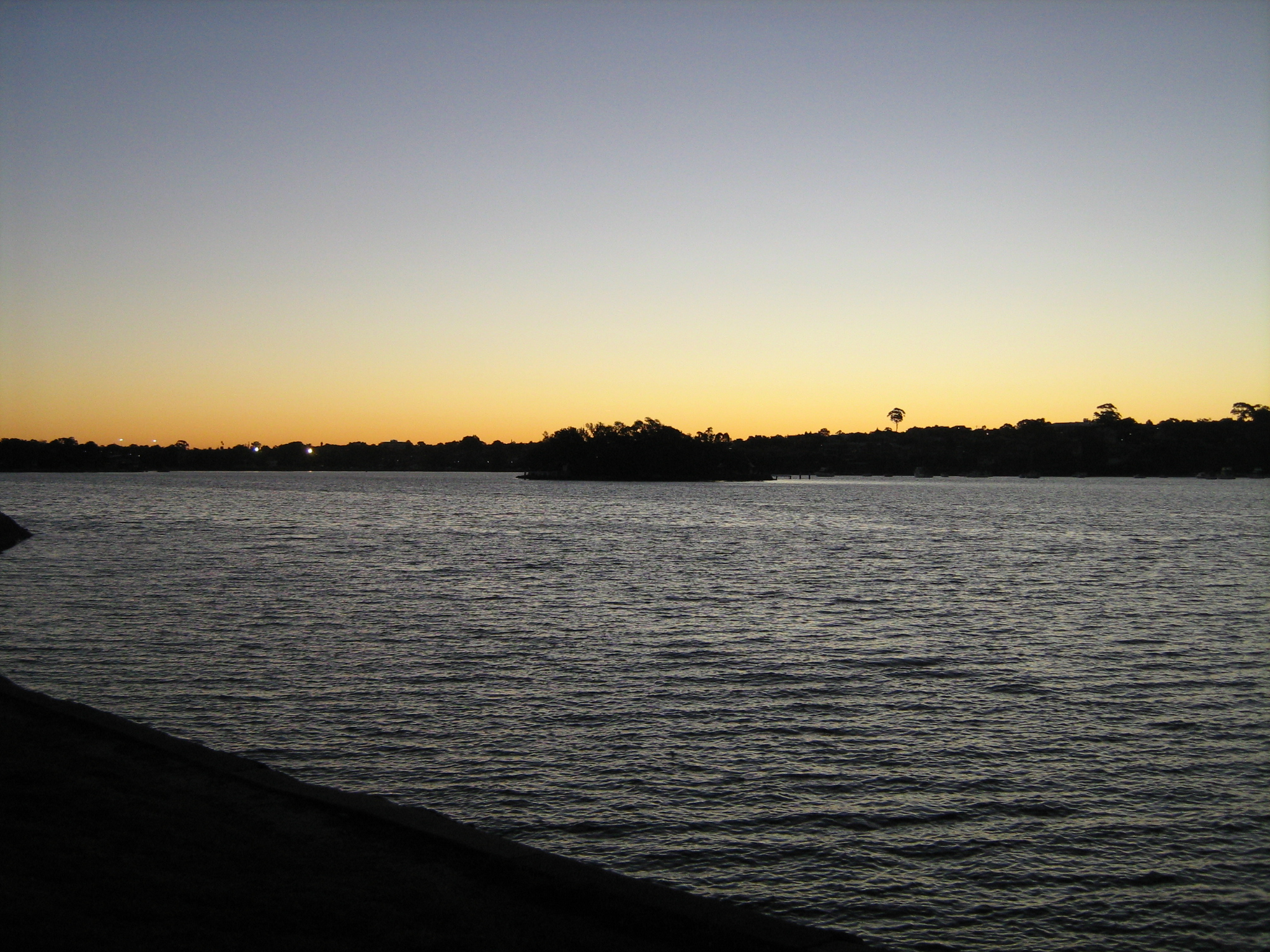
Looking over Iron Cove from Callan Park at dusk
