= Broughton Hall, Lilyfield =

Rozelle Hospital – Broughton Hall
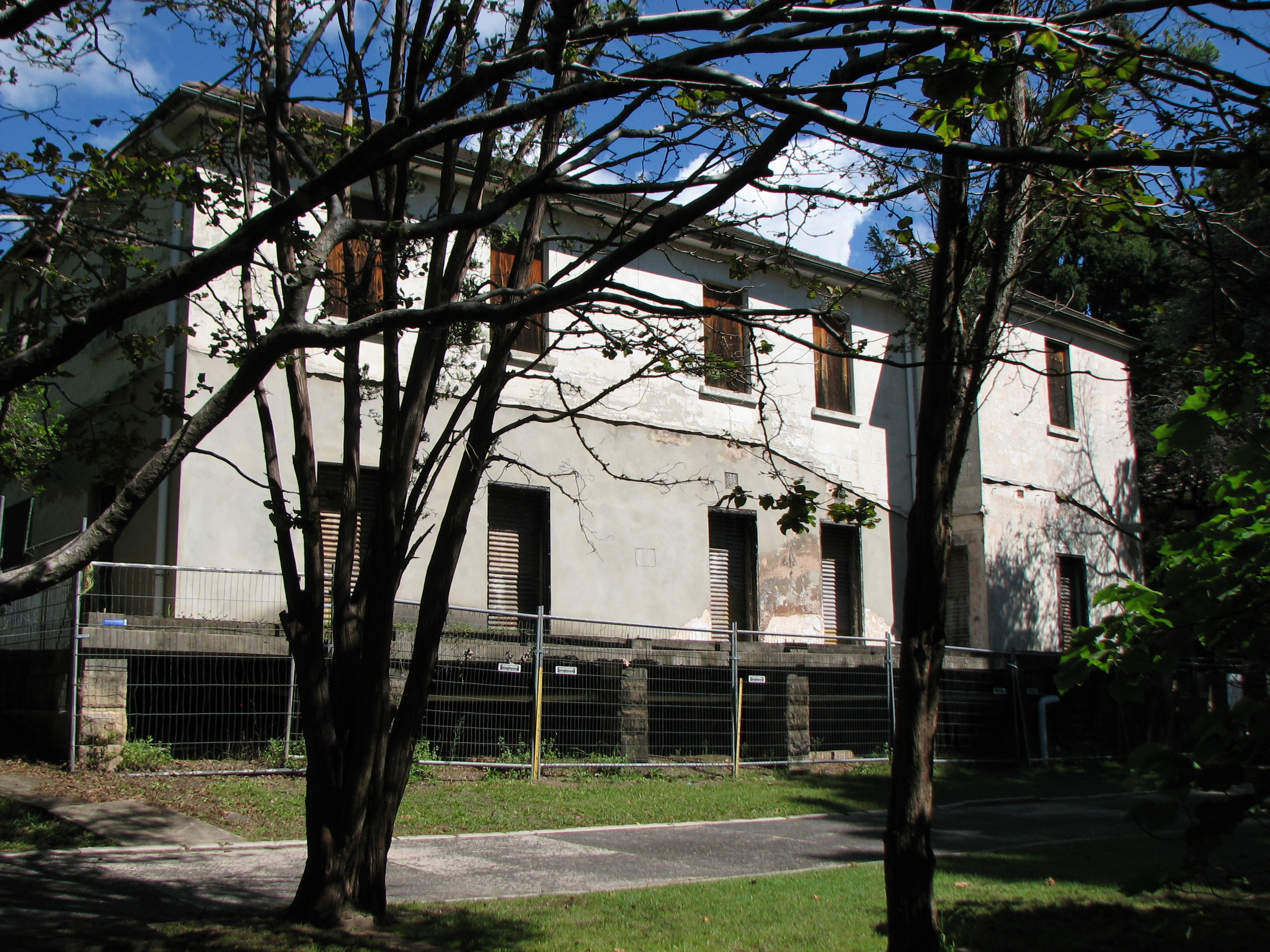
- Broughton Hall, Callan Park, in 2020 – facing the garden area

- Location within New South Wales Location within Australia
- 33.8698°S 151.1582°E
- Location: Balmain Road, Lilyfield, Inner West Council, New South Wales, Australia

History
- Built: c. 1841

Site notes
- Architect: Charles Moore (plantings)
- Owner: NSW Department of Health

New South Wales Heritage Register
- Official name: Rozelle Hospital – Broughton Hall; Broughton Hall; Rivandall
- Type: state heritage (complex / group)
- Designated: 2 April 1999
- Reference no.: 831
- Type: Psychiatric hospital/Mental institute/Asylum
- Category: Health Services

Broughton Hall is a heritage-listed former residence, convalescent hospital and psychiatric clinic situated in Callan Park, which has its main entrance on Balmain Road, Lilyfield, New South Wales in Sydney's Inner West. The house, Broughton House or Broughton Hall, was built c. 1841 and variously served as a residence for prominent businessmen and public figures (1841–1914). It is situated within the Callan Park Conservation Area, in Church Street, Lilyfield, near the corner of Wharf Road. It was used as No. 13 Australian Army Hospital during World War I. Other buildings were constructed over time and the precinct was used as the Broughton Hall Psychiatric Clinic (1921–1976). It was merged into Rozelle Hospital along with the adjacent Callan Park Hospital for the Insane in 1976, during which time it became the first premises for the Rivendell Child, Adolescent and Family Unit. Broughton House fell into disuse, suffering severe damage from fire and vandalism. It was added to the New South Wales State Heritage Register on 2 April 1999.

== History ==
=== Indigenous settlement and early European colonisation ===
Before European settlement the Wangal clan or band lived at the site and their territory extended along the Parramatta River from about Petersham westward. The Wangal were part of the Eora or Dharug tribes. Due to a smallpox epidemic between 1789 and 1790 and European land development, only about 50 people from Dharug families were living in the Sydney area by 1900.

European settlement formed in the Leichhardt area with 15 land grants assigned between 1789 and 1821. The areas west of the peninsula were slow to develop; however, the later land grants were instrumental in developing the future Rozelle Hospital site. Francis Lloyd received 50 acres in 1819 and Luke Ralph received 50 acres in 1821, these adjoining grants stretching from Long or Iron Cove to Rozelle Bay. To their west, Lawrence Butler received 100 acres in 1819. These grants were in common ownership by the 1840s, becoming the Garry Owen Estate, later to become known as Callan Park.

To the west of Butler's grant was a 100-acre grant assigned to John Austen in 1819, initially known as "Spring Cove Estate" but by the 1840s known as "Austenham". The estate had two significant houses on it: Austenham or Kalouan (demolished 1932) and Broughton Hall or Broughton House. John Keep changed the name from Broughton House to Broughton Hall. In 1884 and 1885 the property appeared in Sands Sydney Directory as "Broughton." Then, in the 1886 directory it appeared as "Broughton Hall." The Broughton House/Austenham estate was separated from the Garry Owen Estate by a line formed by the extension northward of Wharf Road.

The Garry Owen Estate was originally owned by Crown Solicitor and Police Magistrate John Ryan Brenan. His house, Garry Owen House, was built about 1839, possibly designed by Colonial Architect Mortimer Lewis. Brenan, a man of keen horticultural interests, developed a large garden and lived at Garry Owen until 1865.

=== Broughton Hall as residence ===
For many years, Garry Owen was a focus for social life in the area. In 1841, Brenan bought an additional three acres west of his estate and built Broughton House c. 1841 (on the opposite side of Wharf Road from his own large estate, Garry Owen), which he then sold with its extensive grounds in 1845. When Brenan advertised for lease in December 1842 the advertisement mentioned: "A house near Garry Owen, consisting of four sitting rooms, six bedrooms, housekeeper's room, house closet and store, wine cellar, butler's pantry, kitchen and back hall, coach house and stables...abundance of water on the land. The house is completed, and posession [sic] can be given immediately...stands in a position which commands a beautiful view of the Parramatta River and Lane Cove" and in 1856 "...never-failing water hole and pump...". It is believed that water for Broughton House's fountains and ponds was originally fed from a natural spring, from between the clay and sandstone stratum.

The construction of Pyrmont Bridge in 1857 and Glebe Island Bridge in 1862 and the Iron Cove Bridge in 1880 opened up land to the west of Rozelle and generated speculative subdivision. Although large estates were rapidly subdivided, the houses and original curtilage of Broughton House and Garry Owen House remained rare survivors. In 1871 there were just 112 houses in the municipality and 614 residents. By 1885 there were 2100 houses and 10,550 residents in what were solidly working-class suburbs.

Brenan's bankruptcy in 1864 forced him to sell Garry Owen Estate to Sydney businessman John Gordon. Gordon renamed that property Callan Park, and in 1873 subdivided the land for auction as a new waterfront suburb. The Callan Estate (but not Broughton House estate to its west) was purchased by the Government of New South Wales in 1874, led by Henry Parkes. Charles Moore, then Director of the Botanic Gardens, was entrusted with designing the Callan Park grounds.

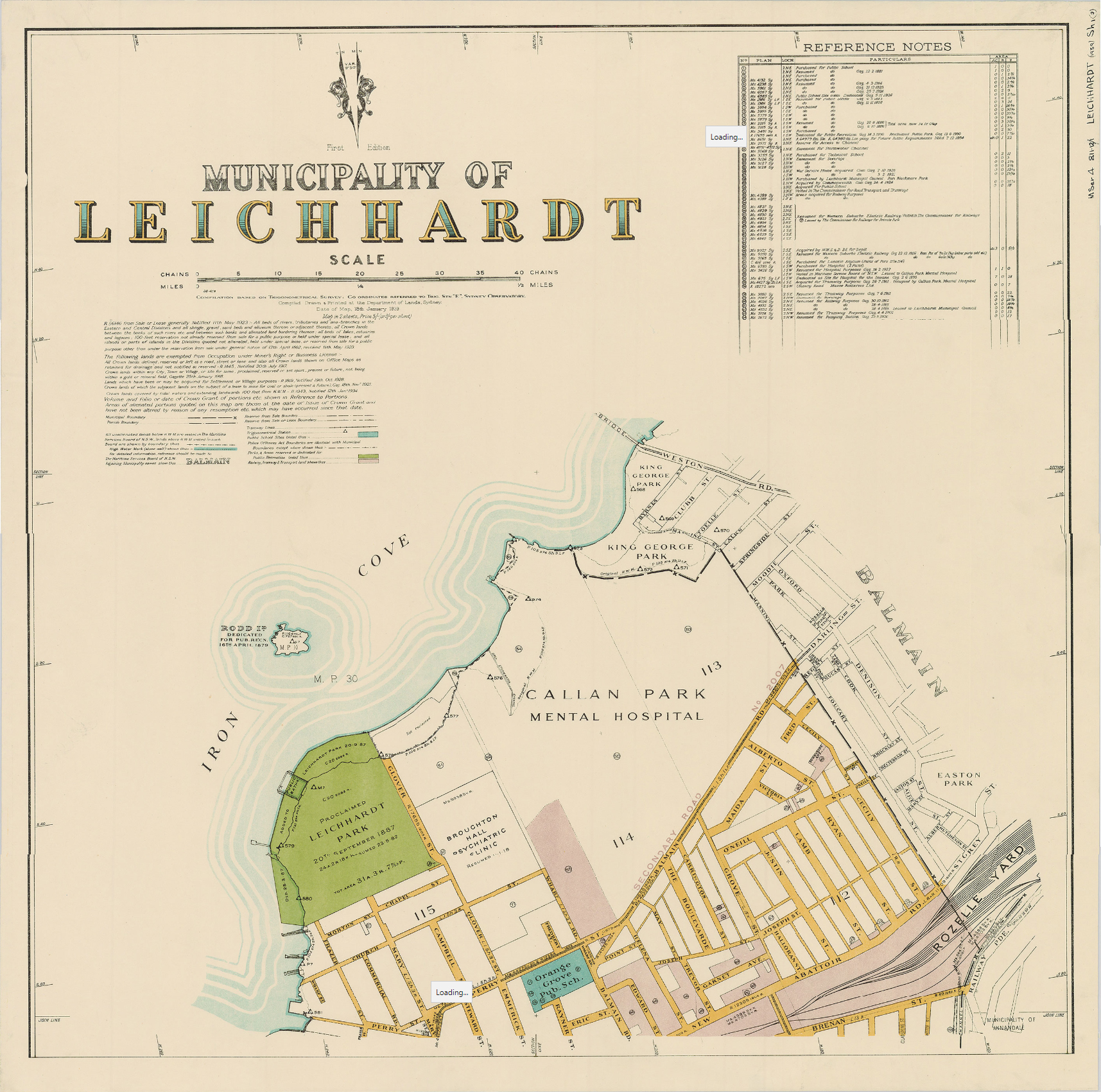
Map showing location of Broughton Hall in Callan Park.

From 1864 to 1905, Broughton House and nearby Kalouan (demolished in 1932) were the family homes of Sydney businessman John Keep. Keep lived there, extending it and purchasing adjoining land. After his death on 2 July 1905, his family sold the estate (the combined properties of Broughton Hall and Kalouan) to Annandale timber merchants William and Frederick Langdon in 1912.

=== Convalescent hospital ===
During World War I, the Langdons offered the site as a convalescent hospital for shell-shocked soldiers. The house and its expansive gardens were the perfect setting as a restorative home for soldiers. During the First World War changes to mental health care were instigated and in 1914 patients could only be treated if they were committed into one of the major institutions. Broughton Hall was resumed by the Government for repatriation care and this function became one of the main functions of Callan Park with additional facilities built in the grounds.

Broughton Hall functioned as No. 13 Australian Army Hospital with the house and grounds used as a convalescent home for returned soldiers from the First World War, until 1921. A photograph of soldiers and nurses in the grounds was in "The Mirror of Australia" on 10 February 1918. During the early years of the 20th century health professionals pushed for early intervention in mental illness.

=== Broughton Hall Psychiatric Clinic ===
It was resumed by the government and on 4 April 1921 formally became the Broughton Hall Psychiatric Clinic. It opened as a voluntary admission clinic, NSW's first such. Through later years under Sydney Evan Jones, it became the largest such facility in Australia. The use of gardens was an integral part of the patients' treatment and paths, ponds and bridges were built throughout the grounds. Evan Jones redesigned Broughton Hall's gardens in the 1920s as a therapeutic environment for patients.

New buildings of similar style and character, designed by the Government Architect, were added between 1920 and 1935.

The part of Broughton Hall south of Church Street and east of Glover Street was redeveloped from 1956 to 1964. Government Architect Michael Dysart designed the Broughton Hall Psychiatric Clinic complex here. Dysart's modernist design was innovative in its day, built on the concept of architecture and landscape as components of therapeutic psychiatric care. Its modernist style is unusual in the wider context of Callan Park or Rozelle Hospital, much of which is Victorian or Federation-era.

Broughton Hall remained a discrete clinic until the NSW Department of Health amalgamated Broughton Hall and the neighbouring Callan Park Mental Asylum to form Rozelle Hospital in 1976.

=== Rozelle Hospital ===
Following the "Barclay Report" of 1988, which emphasised the need for a balance of services between community and hospital-based services, Rozelle Hospital underwent a significant upgrade, including restoration and refurbishment of some buildings and selling off of some land to fund the works. Construction of a new psychiatric complex located off the south-western corner of the Kirkbride block was commenced in 1991, and the use of the Kirkbride block for psychiatric care was subsequently phased out. Health services were increasingly scaled back over time, leaving many buildings in the larger complex empty.

The original Broughton Hall building fell into disuse following the Rivendell Unit vacating the building to move to Concord West in 1977, becoming derelict, open to the elements, and suffering from the impact of vandalism. In 1986, it was damaged by fire.

By the time of Broughton Hall's heritage listing in 1999, Rozelle Hospital was primarily operating from the former Broughton Hall Psychiatric Clinic buildings; although it continued to occupy over 100 buildings on the site, its namesake building continued to be disused.

Rozelle Hospital closed in 2008.

=== Subsequent uses ===
The original Broughton Hall building was vacant and long-disused in 2011, despite the adaptive reuse of many of the associated clinic buildings. It was reported to be in "very poor" condition, having been "extensively damaged by fire, many additions and alterations", and the windows having been boarded-up. The Friends of Callan Park have expressed concern about vandalism and fire damage to the house and "serious neglect" of the heritage gardens.

Following the closure of Rozelle Hospital, drug and alcohol service WHOS occupies a number of the former ward buildings, while the University of Tasmania opened their Rozelle campus in 2010 on another section of the former Broughton Hall clinic site.

== Description ==
The original Broughton Hall building is a two-storey Victorian Georgian Revival style residence with additions in the 1880s. The walls are painted render, while the former slate roof has been replaced with concrete tiles.

The site is unique in Sydney. The original house is now a shell but remains on its original acreage. It is possible to recognise in the structure of the garden today the same layout in photographs taken at Federation.

It has expansive grounds comprising rainforest landscaping and other temperate climate trees and shrubs arrayed around a creekline running northeast of the house downhill to the Parramatta River. Terracing and level changes marked in brick and stone retaining walls are immediately north of Broughton Hall's main homestead. The rainforest gully is beyond that. Its grounds include rainforest species planting following the creek line north east of the house. Plantings date from across the late nineteenth and twentieth century, including some rare species.

== Heritage listing ==
The house is one of the oldest remaining in the district and has strong associations with the early development and history of the Rozelle area. It is an impressive early Victorian Georgian residence.

The house is set in extensive grounds, which retain much of their original layout, features and plantings, including a dense planting of NSW and other rainforest tree species, some sent and recommended by Charles Moore, then curator of the Botanic Gardens, Sydney.

Broughton Hall Psychiatric Clinic gardens are of historic significance on a regional level in their demonstration of the views of Dr Sydney Evan Jones on the value of gardens in the care of the mentally ill. The form and character of the original garden setting for Broughton Hall, noted in its time, is still evident.

Broughton Hall was listed on the New South Wales State Heritage Register on 2 April 1999.
