= Parramatta Road =

Road in Sydney, New South Wales, Australia

Coordinates: 33.86814°S 151.09909°E

Parramatta Road New South Wales
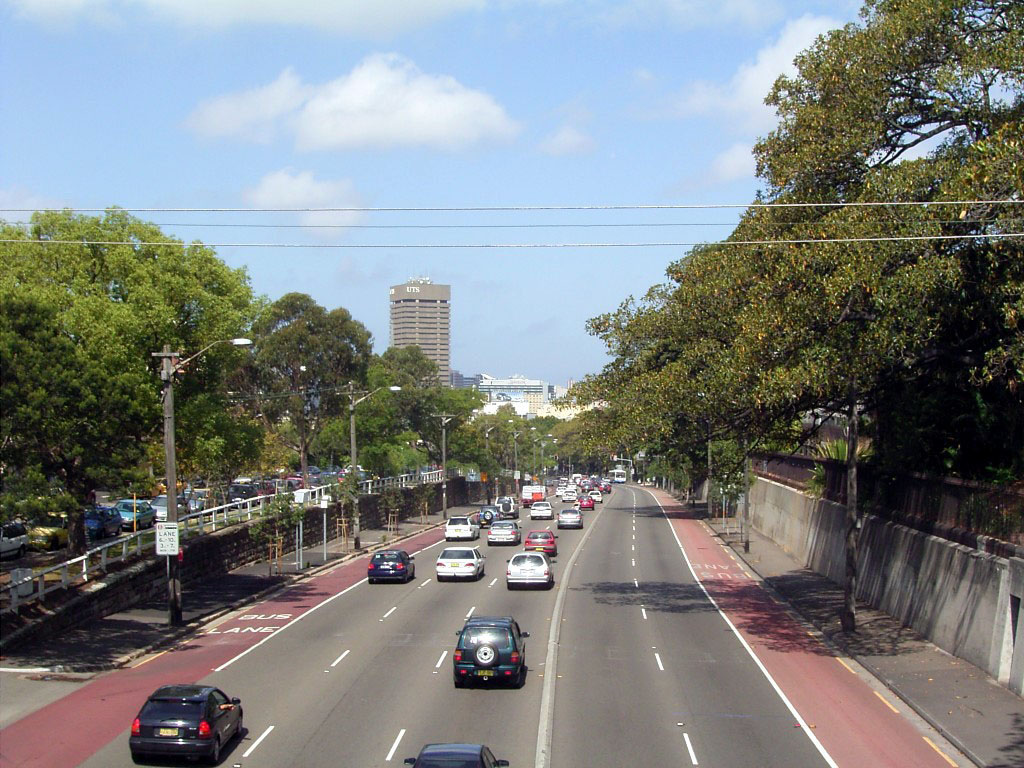

General information
- Type: Road
- Length: 23 km (14 mi)
- Opened: 1811
- Route number(s): A22 (2013–present) (Chippendale–Summer Hill); A44 (2013–present) (Haberfield–Granville)
- Former route number: see Former route allocations

Major junctions
- East end: Broadway; Chippendale, Sydney
- Liverpool Road; Wattle Street; M4 East; Marlborough Road; Silverwater Road; Woodville Road
- West end: Church Street; Granville, Sydney

Location(s)
- Major suburbs: Ultimo, Chippendale, Glebe, Camperdown, Forest Lodge, Annandale, Stanmore, Leichhardt. Petersham, Lewisham, Haberfield, Summer Hill Ashfield. Five Dock, Croydon, Concord, Burwood, Strathfield, Homebush, Auburn

Parramatta Road is the major historical east-west artery of metropolitan Sydney, New South Wales, Australia, connecting the Sydney CBD with Parramatta. It is the easternmost part of the Great Western Highway. Since the 1990s its role has been augmented by the City West Link and M4 Motorway.

The road begins in the east as a continuation of George Street, which becomes Broadway west of Harris Street, and Parramatta Road west of the City Road junction, and ends at the junction with Church Street in Parramatta. Its 23 kilometres (14 mi) distance is dominated by caryards and small marginally-viable shops. At the same time, however, it has over 100 abandoned and derelict stores. Owing to this and its abrasively noisy traffic, it has rarely been considered beautiful.

Opened in 1811, it is one of Sydney's oldest roads and Australia's first road between two cities (before Sydney and Parramatta coalesced). As at 2015, over three million commuters every year drove Parramatta Road. The road is the hub of Sydney's motor dealership industry - with 67% of the adjacent land used for motor retailing and services.

== History ==
=== 1790s–1800s: Development ===
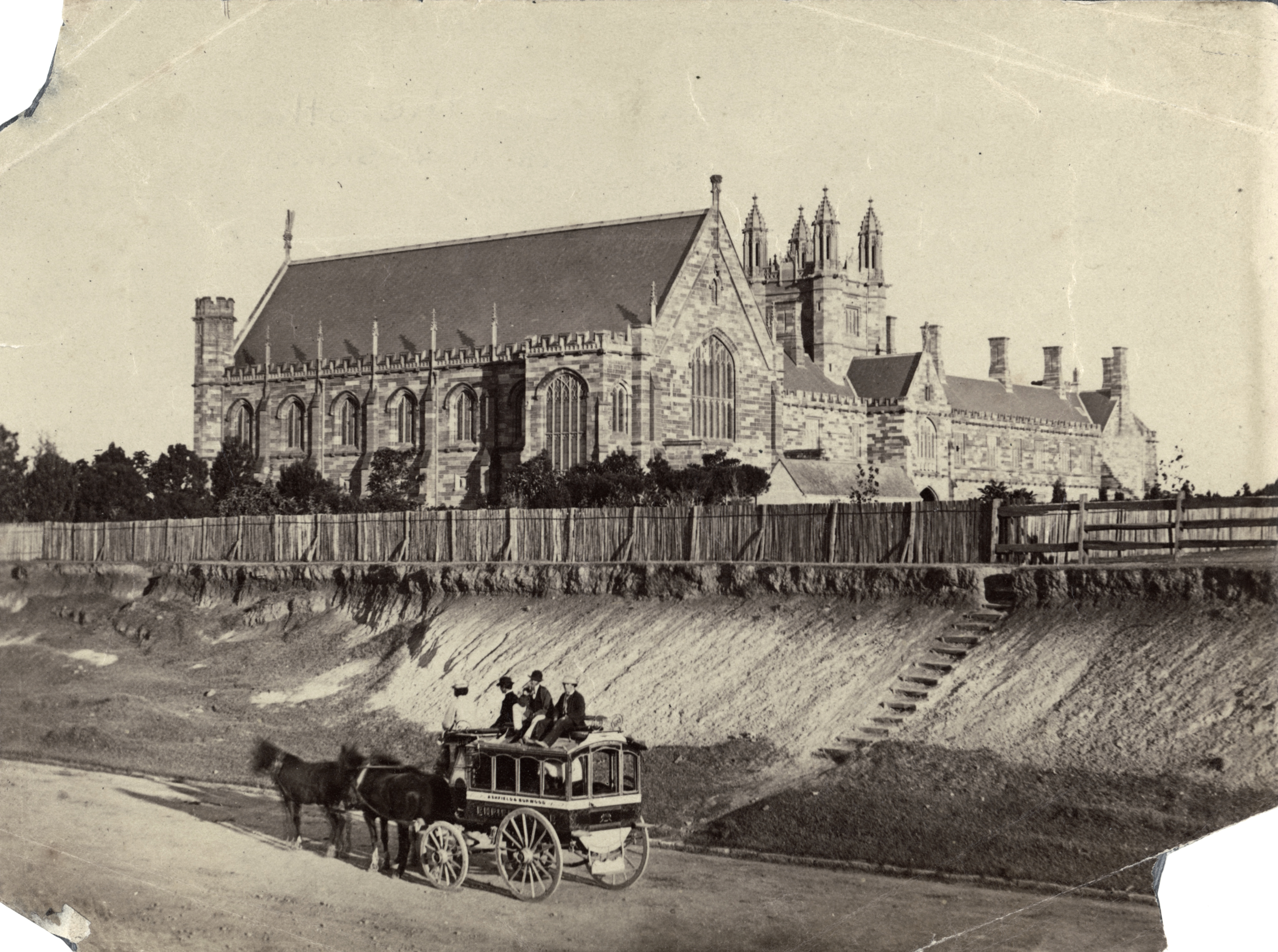
A carriage marked "Ashfield-Burwood" trundles down Parramatta Road in the early 1870s, with the University of Sydney in the background.

British settlement in Parramatta began in the same year (1788) as it did in Sydney. The Parramatta River was used as navigation between them. Sometime between 1789 and 1791 an overland track was made to provide an official land route between the two settlements.

Parramatta Road dates to the 1792 formation of a route linking Sydney to the settlement of Parramatta. This route was formalised under the direction of Surveyor–General Augustus Alt in 1797. Parramatta Road became one of the colony's most important early roads, and for many years remained one of Sydney's principal thoroughfares. The early road was a poorly built and poorly maintained track through bush. In 1794, the governor of the colony reported that he had caused a very good road to be made, but there is no evidence that any bridges were built over the streams. The road subsequently deteriorated and on 9 June 1805 the Sydney Gazette reported that the road was impassable as the result of heavy rain. Attempts to improve the road continued over the years.

=== 1810–1815 ===
By 1811, Parramatta Road had officially opened to traffic and was financed during a large portion of the 19th century by a toll, with toll booths located at what now is Sydney University and the Duck River. Governor Macquarie called tenders for the repair of the road, raised a three shilling per gallon levy on spirits and levied a toll to pay for the work. The road was to be 10 metres wide. This turnpike road was opened on 10 April 1811. The toll barriers were at the present Railway Square and at Becket's Creek (near Parramatta).

In 1814, a stage cart service was established along Parramatta Road. Fares were 10 shillings for passengers and 3 pence for letters. Heavy rain again nearly destroyed this road, so in 1817 it was announced that all tree-stumps would be removed and the road paved with stone which would be covered with earth and gravel. This improvement was announced as finished on 15 January 1815.

In 1815 the "profit" from the Sydney toll reached £465. The growth of Sydney caused the toll barrier to be moved to Grose Farm (present University of Sydney) in April 1836. In 1839 it was moved further west to Annandale.

=== 1820s–1880s ===
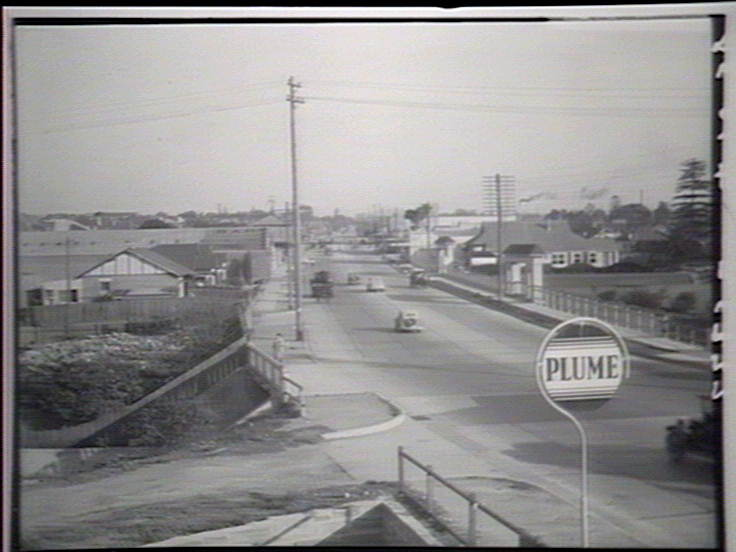
Parramatta Road in the 1930s looking east across Iron Cove Creek towards Lewisham

The colony's first stage coach (valued at £300) was imported in 1821 but did not begin regular service until 1823. The stage left the city at 7:00 am, arrived in Parramatta at 9:30 am and left Parramatta for the return journey at 4:00 pm. Inside passengers were charged six shillings. Hazards on the road included the threat of attacks by Indigenous people and bushrangers. Hotels and settlements sprang up along the road to serve coaching traffic.

The importance of the road declined with the advent of the Sydney-Parramatta railway in 1855. In 1883, a steam tram line opened along Parramatta Road as far as Annandale, and was extended onward to Norton Street in 1884, where it turned to run along Norton Street to Short Street.

In the 1800s, the government acquired a strip of land from Ashfield to Burwood from the Rosebank Estate, owned by the Sisters of the Good Samaritan, Australia's first religious congregation. Rosebank College now stands on the former Rosebank Estate, and the heritage-listed building of the private school stands adjacent to the road at Five Dock.

=== 1900s–present: Motorisation ===
Sydney Municipal Council began widening the major routes into the city centre in 1911, including the construction of Broadway and the widening of the cutting on Parramatta Road adjacent to Sydney University. In the 1920s, the road was sealed and tramlines were removed from the road. Sheep and cattle were still crossing Parramatta Road at Homebush as late as the 1960s.

Increased traffic congestion along the road steadily made it less attractive for residential and commercial use during the 20th century. By the last quarter of the 20th century, the only active businesses on many stretches of the road were car dealerships. The decline of industry in the Inner West also drove the decline of commercial areas formerly catering to factory workers. By the end of the 20th century, proposals to revitalise Parramatta Road and make it more attractive were regularly made.

In 1985, the Design Arts Board of the Australia Council sponsored an ideas competition for Parramatta Road.

One of these proposals was made in 2012, which would have widened and lowered the road below street level in a "slot" as part of the Roads & Maritime Services WestConnex motorway proposal. This plan was abandoned, and the WestConnex proposal was later changed to a pair of tunnels parallel to Parramatta Road and connecting to the existing M4 motorway. The new extension was known as M4 East and was eventually built between the end of the existing M4 motorway in North Strathfield and Haberfield, where it connected to the A4 road. The new tunnels opened to traffic in July 2019. The project resulted in the creation of a new entry and exit ramp on Parramatta Road in Ashfield, the narrowing of westbound traffic lanes for through-traffic to one lane at either end of the tunnel, and the demolition of a large number of houses in Ashfield and Haberfield to make way for the tunnel ramps.

== Criticism ==
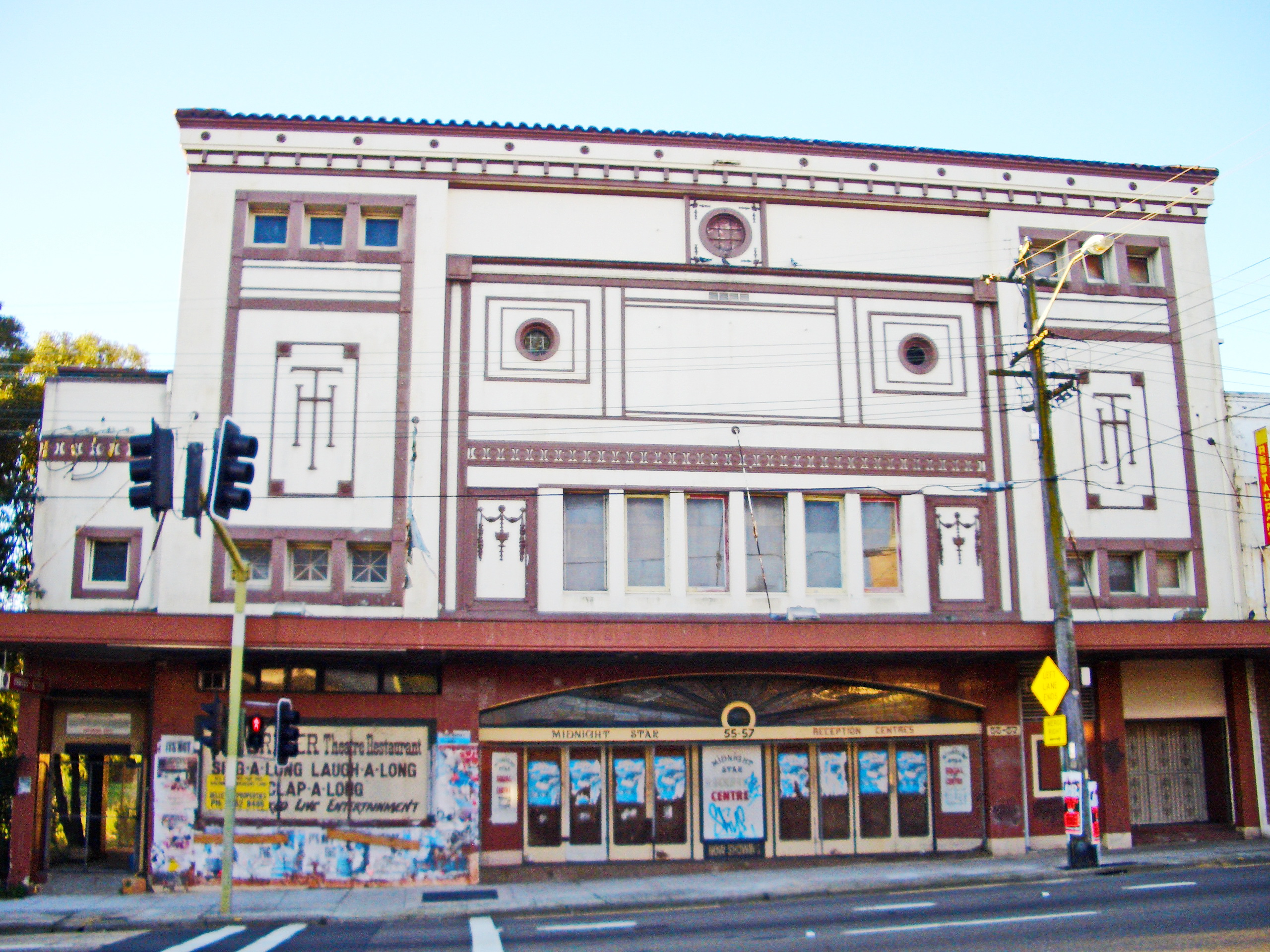
Homebush Cinema, built in 1925, is one of the many derelict establishments on the road, which operated until 1996 as a reception centre.

The road has been criticised by the community for its traffic pollution, congestion, and for its vacant shops and rundown buildings, particularly between Leichhardt and Concord, and local government has been accused of failing to adopt policies to encourage the redevelopment and regeneration of vacant sites.

A local mayor described it as a "varicose vein". A NSW Business Chamber Executive Patricia Forsythe said that the road is "one of the least attractive commercial areas of Sydney". Former NSW premier Nick Greiner thought the road looked "like Beirut on a bad day". The Sydney Morning Herald writer Elizabeth Farrelly described it as "filthy, noisy, sclerotic and dull". On a lighter note, Tess De Quincey, an Australian performer and director said, "Every chapter of Sydney's history has been written on Parramatta Road." A Sydney Morning Herald editor said that whilst the road is "ugly in parts, drab in others, and generally unpleasant", it is still "fundamental to the economic and social viability of the greater city".

Since the 1970s many buildings fronting Parramatta Road, especially those in the prime locations of the Inner West (from Newtown to Homebush), have become vacant and fallen into disrepair, with many vandalised. Previously these buildings were a major part of local life for the suburbs along Parramatta Road, providing employment, retailing and other services. The buildings with graffiti and broken windows provide a sight that is sought out by graffiti vandals and proficient urban photographers.

Nicholas Munning, an owner of a music store in Annandale, described the road as, "A lost cause...You can see the hodgepodge of buildings - abandoned buildings, abandoned shops - [with people thinking] let's just let this sit here for four years until we get council approval to knock it down and build apartments...They don't care if it sits there vacant with broken windows and looks like shit, The problem is the whole road looks like that. So nobody is going to say, 'hey, this is a great area. I'm going to spend $x making a really classy looking shop or restaurant'."

== Redevelopment of Parramatta Road ==
There have been a number of proposals or attempts to redevelop Parramatta Road. Many (but not all) plans incorporate improved public transport to reduce traffic congestion, in the form of light rail or bus rapid transit. Parramatta Road is one of the busiest bus corridors in Sydney.

Revitalising Parramatta Road was a key promise when WestConnex was announced in 2012.

Parramatta Road is one of the busiest bus corridors in Sydney.

In 2020, the Committee for Sydney published a list of previous renewal attempts.

=== Current status ===
As of 2026, ALTRAC Light Rail have proposed that a light rail corridor between Parramatta Road and Green Square be developed. The ALTRAC Light Rail consortium was previously named Connecting Sydney and includes Transdev, Alstom and Acciona. ALTRAC is 95% owned by John Laing Group and 5% owned by Acciona Concesiones.

As of November 2026, Transport for NSW had a vision to revitalise Parramatta Road using bus lanes and T3 transit lanes "within the existing road space", within the short-term.

=== Timeline ===
Proposals for Parramatta Road redevelopment
Date	Plan	Proponent	Transit technology	Cycleway	Footpaths	Terminus	References
1948	County of Cumberland plan	Cumberland County Council; DMR	Tram removal, Clearways	No			
1998-10	Parramatta Road 2000 and Beyond	Inner Metropolitan Regional Organisation of Councils	Investigate Light rail	On parallel / alternative routes			
2000	Clover Moore's Parramatta Road Taskforce	Clover Moore	Light rail		Widened		
2001	2001 Parramatta Road Project						
~2002	Choi Ropiha Fighera (CHROFI), McGregor Coxall	Parramatta Road Master Plan Competition					
2002-10-30	Government of New South Wales; Carl Scully	[feasibility analysis]	Light rail				
2000-2002	SydneyCentral Design Consortium - for Inner Metro Regional Councils (IMROC), RTA, STA, Planning NSW	Parramatta Road Strategic Plan	Light rail				
2004							
2011-03		[linked with M4]	Light rail				
2011	NRMA	NRMA re-imagining	Light rail	Yes	"priority"		
2012	City of Sydney	Sustainable Sydney 2030	Light rail, BRT or metro			Green Square	
June 2012	Urban Taskforce Australia	Parramatta Road Liveability Corridor (Urban Renewal Authority)	Light rail (after M4)	Yes, elevated above tram	Yes, elevated above tram		
2012-10-12	Infrastructure NSW	WestConnex, 2012 conceptual design	Trenched motorway (slot)				
2012-12	Transport for NSW	Sydney's Light Rail Future	Light rail				
2013	NSW Government	Parramatta Road Urban Transformation Program (PRUTP)					
2013-12	Transport for NSW	Sydney City Centre Access Strategy	Light rail or BRT				
2014-07-18	Government of New South Wales; Mike Baird		Investigation of light rail				
2016-11	UrbanGrowth (NSW Government)	Parramatta Road Urban Transformation Strategy / Parramatta Road Corridor Urban Transformation Strategy (PRCUTS)	BRT, Potential longtermLight rail				
2017-02	Inner West Council, City of Canada Bay		guided bus / "GETS"				
2017 (cancelled)	Transport for NSW	Parramatta Road Intermediate Transit	Light rail			Sydney CBD, Burwood	
2017	Transport for NSW; (GHD Group)	Transport Planning Analysis and Drafting Support – Parramatta Road Intermediate Transit					
2023-02	Transport for NSW	A vision for the Parramatta Road Corridor	BRT				
2024-09	Committee for Sydney et al		Light rail			Burwood, Green Square	
2024-2026	ALTRAC	[three light rail options]	Light rail			Burwood, Mascot	

Empty cells in the above timeline represent an unknown, or not yet added.

=== History ===
==== Early / mid 20th century ====
The 1948 County Cumberland Plan proposed removing trams from the street.

==== Late 20th century ====
The October 1998 'Parramatta Road 2000 and Beyond' report included the strategy to investigate "Mass transit options including light rail extensions".

==== 2000s ====
A Parramatta Road light rail plan was first floated by Clover Moore in 2000. Clover Moore's 2000 Clover Moore's Parramatta Road Taskforce proposal included wider footpaths and extending light rail.

On 30 October 2002, the Government of New South Wales announced they would examine the feasibility of light rail on Parramatta Road.

A 2004 proposal did not materialise, but it is unclear what this plan actually was.

==== Early 2010s ====
In 2010, the Centre for International Economics estimated the impacts of a Light Rail Extension.

In March 2011, the potential construction of a Parramatta Road Light Rail route was publicly linked with the construction of the M4 Motorway tunnel by the The Sydney Morning Herald.

In the June 2012 NSW Government state budget there was a $50 million allocation for a new urban activation precinct program to kick-start new urban precincts, and the CEO of Urban Taskforce Australia said 'Parramatta Road was a good example of that such a precinct.

In a community attitudes survey commissioned by NRMA in 2010, 20% of residents living in the corridor for the then-proposed M4 East Extension regarded Parramatta Road revitalisation as the most important benefit of the project. (Note: The demographics information does not included breakdown of drivers however support or strong support for the extension was 72% among the respondents, 77 amongst NRMA members, and 47% among non-drivers.) 76-85% of respondents in the M4 corridor were more likely to support or strongly support the M4 East extension if the proposal included transport links, better shopping, cycling and walking opportunities and redevelopment.

The 2011 NRMA re-imagining proposal included a light rail., within a proposal for the M4 East Extension. It suggested Parramatta Road would be narrowed from 6 lanes to 2 lanes, include a dedicated right-of-way for trams, bike paths and a widened footpath. The NRMA wanted the M4 East completed, and this was considered a requirement for it. It estimated the cost of 'Light rail along Parramatta Road' at $985 million, 'Public Transit along Parramatta Road' at $380 million, and 'Streetscape/cycle/pedestrian improvements' at $85 million (in comparison to M4 tunnel construction, excluding Victoria Road and Botany Road legs, at $5.6 billion).

In 2012, the City of Sydney Council recommended that a Light Rail link be built from the city to Green Square. The council spent more than $30 million buying land for a light rail corridor.

In June 2012, ABC News covered plans for Parramatta Road on the 7.30 program.

In December 2012, Parramatta Road was one of 4 priority corridors in the NSW Government document Sydney's Light Rail Future.

The Government of New South Wales 2013 Sydney City Centre Access Strategy stated Parramatta Road would be investigated for BRT and light rail.

On 18 July 2014, Mike Baird announced investment in light rail, and "Parramatta to Sydney CBD via Parramatta Road" was a route for investigation.

==== Late 2010s ====
In February 2015, Principal of SGS Planning Terry Rawnsley called for a metro rail line along Parramatta Road between Westmead and Central, rather than a motorway.

In June 2015, Rob Stokes agreed to restart community consultation on the Parramatta Road Urban Transformation program.

In 2016, the Government of New South Wales published the 'Parramatta Road Urban Transformation Strategy', with a 30 year plan for redeveloping the area through planning and infrastructure investment. Among the strategy's goals are housing an additional 56,000 people in 27,000 new homes on the corridor (with minimum five percent affordable housing); 50,000 workers employed in the area; and 66 hectares of new open space is provided through linear parks and along watercourses or infrastructure. The The Urban Amenity Improvement Program (UAIP) was a $198 million program under the Parramatta Road Corridor Urban Transformation Program to encourage development. It included over $11 million in local contributions to active transport infrastructure.

In February 2017, Inner West Council and City of Canada Bay councils proposed using an electric guided bus running on the centre of the road for public transport, as opposed to kerbside buses as suggested in the strategy. Reports for a transport opportunities study and summary were published. The report found that kerbside running BRT system would convey a ‘business as usual’ sense, and not deliver the desired urban transformation.

Within the first three months of 2017, The Sydney Morning Herald reported plans developed for Transport for NSW between the Sydney CBD and Burwood were abandoned. The project was estimated to cost up to $2.7 billion. A document repapered for a risk workshop found the bus network would not be able to accommodate planned growth. Block-by-block designs and documents marked cabinet-in-confidence were published.

In 2017, after media reports that proposals had been scrapped, a $150,000 contract was let to consulting and services firm GHD Group, for a project titled Transport Planning Analysis and Drafting Support – Parramatta Road Intermediate Transit.

==== Early 2020s ====
In February 2023, Transport for NSW stated their vision for the Parramatta Road Corridor had some short bus lanes, bus lanes perpendicular to the road, and signal upgrades for 'bus jumps'. Their long term vision was to progressively upgrade public transport connections, bicycle paths and local street-scapes. They stated the long term vision was dependant on funding and completion of a Final Business Case.

In 2023, the City of Sydney restated its intention in its draft Access Strategy, along with plans to extend the system further down George Street and Broadway towards the University of Sydney.

In December 2023, Transport for NSW claimed the Parramatta Road Corridor transit route and active transport improvements require road widening.

In 2024, NSW Roads Minister John Graham was forced to intervene after Transport for NSW planned to demolish 196 homes and businesses to add an extra lane to Parramatta Road. Inner West Council independent councillor Pauline Lockie stated Transport for NSW's plans appeared to be contrary to everything the state government is trying to do to revitalise Parramatta Road, and that the community was promised traffic would reduce once WestConnex opened. The Inner West Council sought written confirmation from Transport for NSW that it would withdraw the proposed road widenings. The Committee for Sydney argued it was not necessary to acquire properties along Parramatta Road to put in better public transport.

The secretary of the Department of Planning, Housing and Infrastructure also contacted Transport for NSW to seek an update on the Parramatta Road widening matter.

In April 2024 Transport for NSW proposed T3 transit lane. Transport for NSW claimed this part of the road did not have enough space to install a bus lane without land acquisition.

On May 21 2024, a letter in response to the February 20 letter was received. It stated that TfNSW's original proposal to widen the road "can be considered withdrawn". (Note: The author of this letter is not clear) The letter was received on the day of the council meeting and most councillors hadn't received or read a copy by the council meeting on the same day.

In June 2024, ALTRAC proposed a plan for a new light rail corridor between Green Square and Leichhardt via Central.

In July 2024, the Committee for Sydney hosted a summit focusing on Parramatta Road and plans for light rail or bus rapid transit. City of Sydney planning staff raised the challenge of culture change required by road traffic planners.

In August 2024, a number of organisations wrote to Chris Minns to call for light rail from Parramatta Road to Green Square via Central Station.

==== Late 2020s ====
In September 2025, Business Sydney expressed their support for light rail on Parramatta Road.

In February 2026, Altrac presented a plan for three light rail extensions at the Committee for Sydney's Sydney Summit.

In October 2026, Burwood Council proposed a light rail plan. Altrac CEO Duncan Edghill claimed it would unlock "something like" 70,000 to 100,000 homes along the corridor.

== Location ==
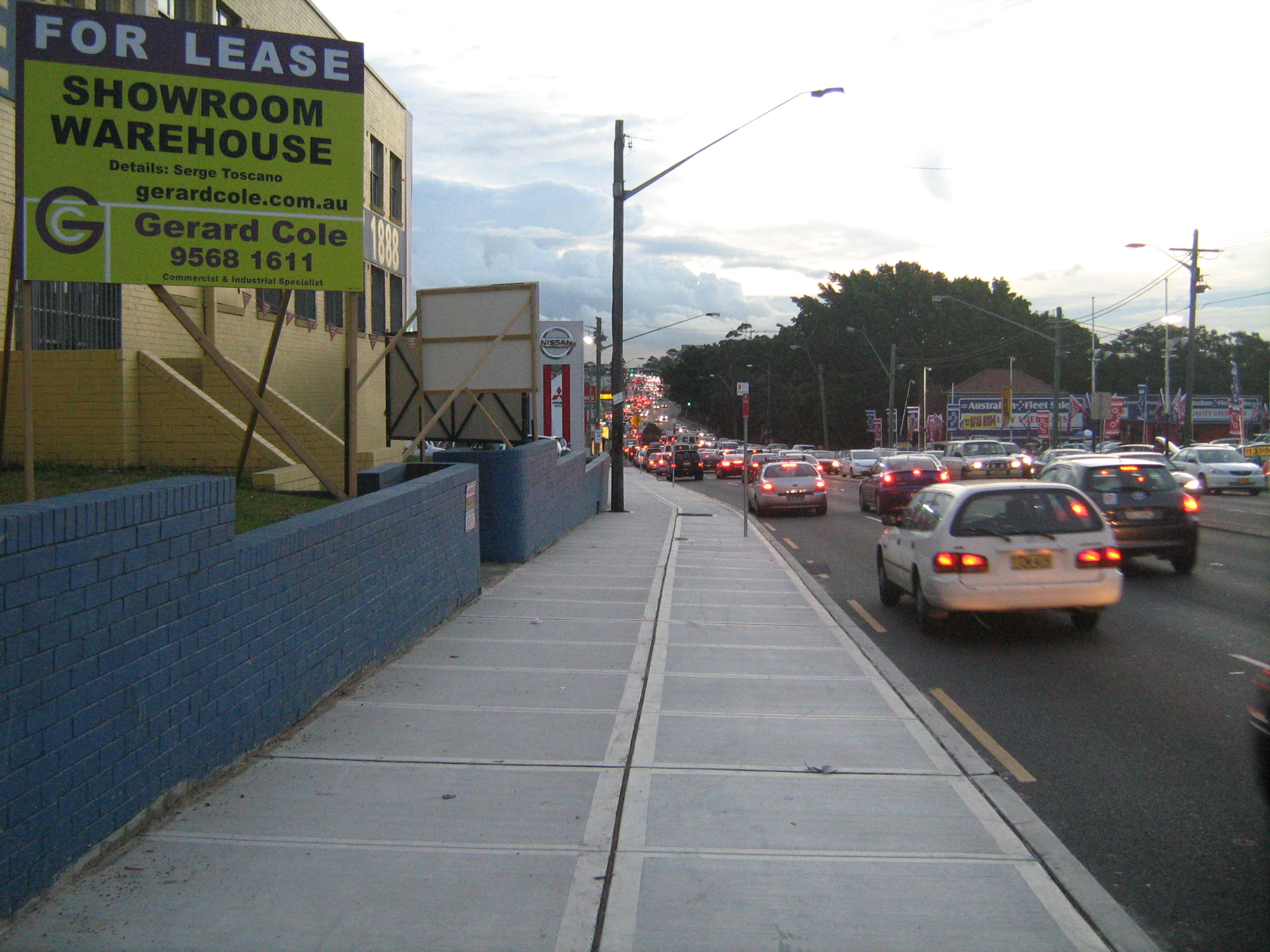
Parramatta Road looking west at Burwood, near Rosebank College, during peak hour

The highway forms the boundaries of various suburbs along the way and ends at the junction of Church Street, Parramatta, where the Great Western Highway briefly turns to the north. Parramatta Road forms the southern boundary of the following suburbs:

- Ultimo
- Glebe
- Forest Lodge
- Annandale
- Leichhardt
- Haberfield
- Five Dock
- Concord

Parramatta Road forms the northern boundary of the following suburbs:

- Chippendale
- Camperdown
- Stanmore
- Lewisham
- Petersham
- Summer Hill
- Ashfield
- Croydon
- Burwood

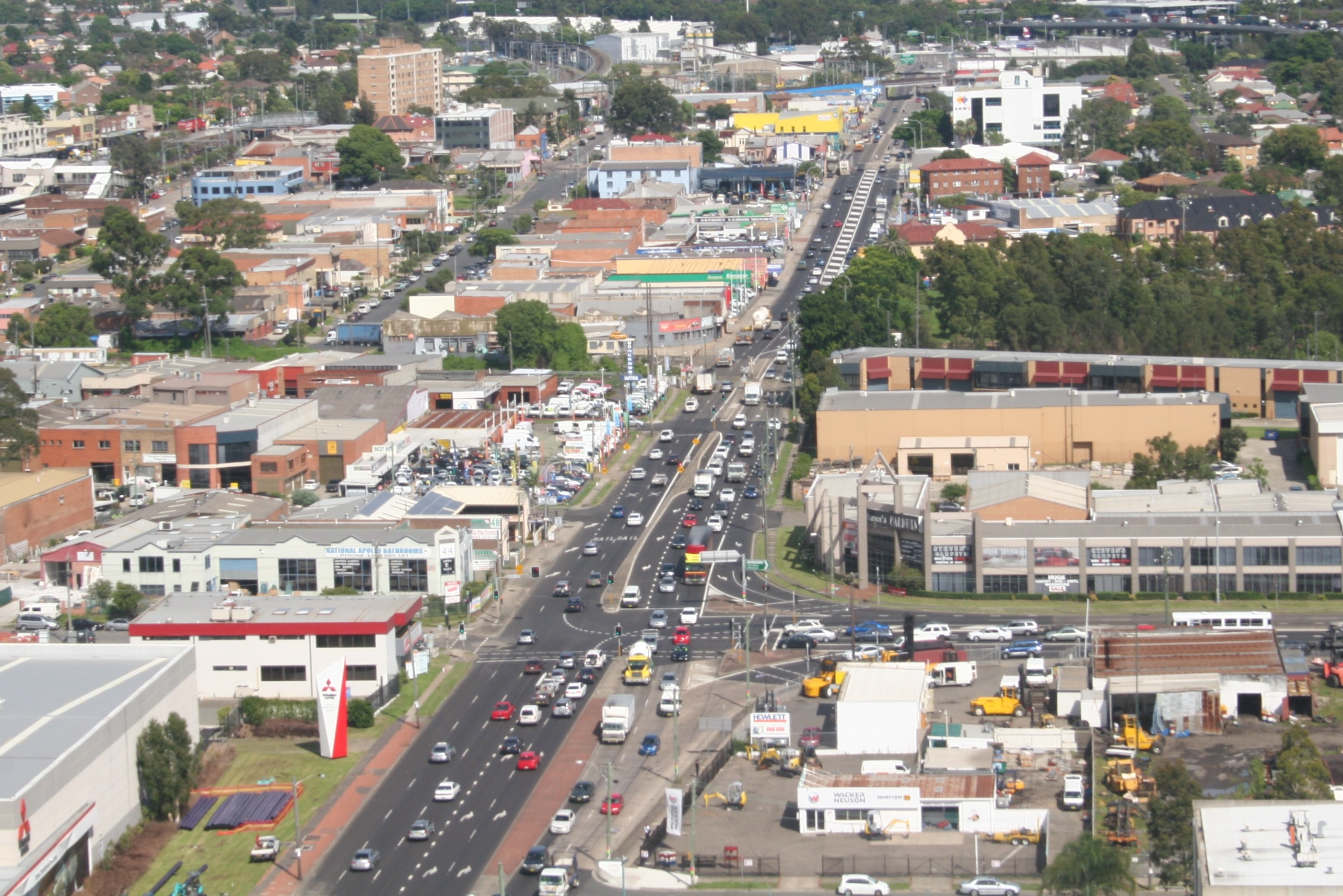
Parramatta Road looking west at Clyde, near James Ruse Drive

West of Concord and Burwood, Parramatta Road passes through Strathfield, Homebush, Auburn, Clyde and Granville before reaching Parramatta.

== Former route numbers ==
Parramatta Road has many former route allocations including former National Route 32. Where and when the former route numbers were implemented are stated below.

Chippendale – Summer Hill:

- National Route 32 (1954–1992)
- Metroad 4 (1992–2000)
- Metroad 5 (1992–2001)
- State Route 31 (2001–2013)
- A22 (2013–present)

Summer Hill – Haberfield:

- National Route 32 (1954–1992)
- Metroad 4 (1992–2000)
- unallocated: (2000–present)

Haberfield – North Strathfield:

- National Route 32 (1954–1992)
- Metroad 4 (1992–2013)
- A4 (2013–2019)
- A44 (2019–present)

North Strathfield – Auburn:

- National Route 32 (1954–1982)
- State Route 44 (1982–2013)
- A44 (2013–present)

Auburn – Clyde:

- National Route 32 (1954–1984)
- State Route 44 (1982–2013)
- A44 (2013–present)

Clyde – Granville:

- National Route 32 (1954–1986)
- State Route 44 (1982–2013)
- A44 (2013–present)
