= New South Wales Government Architect =

Appointed office

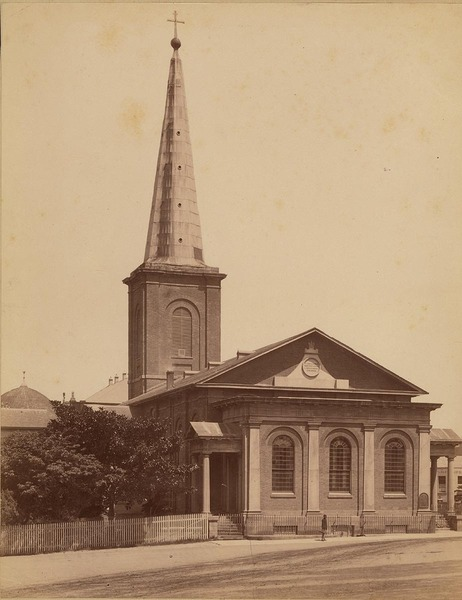
St. James Church, Sydney in the 1880s, designed by the first Colonial Architect in the 1820s)

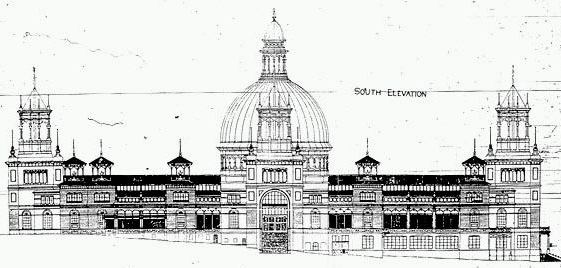
Architectural drawing of the Garden Palace, designed by Colonial Architect James Barnet in the 1870s

The New South Wales Government Architect, an appointed officer of the Government of New South Wales, serves as the General Manager of the Government Architect's Office (GAO), a multi-disciplinary consultancy operating on commercial principles providing architecture, design, and engineering services, that is an agency of the government within NSW Public Works.

Historically, the government architect was in charge of the government's public building projects across the state of New South Wales, Australia. Since the 1990s, when the consultancy service began operating on commercial principles, the Government Architect has reported separately in a second capacity, as an advisor to the government, and serves on various committees and boards in relation to heritage protection, architecture, and design.

The first officer in the role, then styled Colonial Architect, was Francis Greenway, appointed in 1816.

== Colonial architects ==
=== Francis Greenway (1816–1822) ===
Francis Greenway was the first official architect for the Colony of New South Wales in a role that was called Colonial Architect and later NSW Government Architect. He was appointed in 1816 by Governor Macquarie to be Acting Civil Architect and Assistant Engineer responsible to Captain J M Gill, Inspector of Public Works. Greenway was a convict who had been sentenced to transportation for forgery. Greenway's works included the Macquarie Lighthouse on South Head, the Fort on Bennelong Point and the Stables for Government House. Greenway's other major buildings include the Obelisk in Macquarie Place, the Church of St James, St Mathews Church at Windsor and the Hyde Park Barracks.

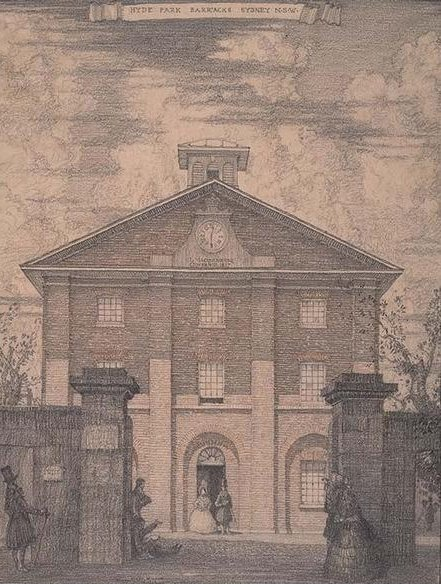
Hyde Park Barracks, designed by Francis Greenway; Old Colonial Georgian style; drawing by William Hardy Wilson in 1914

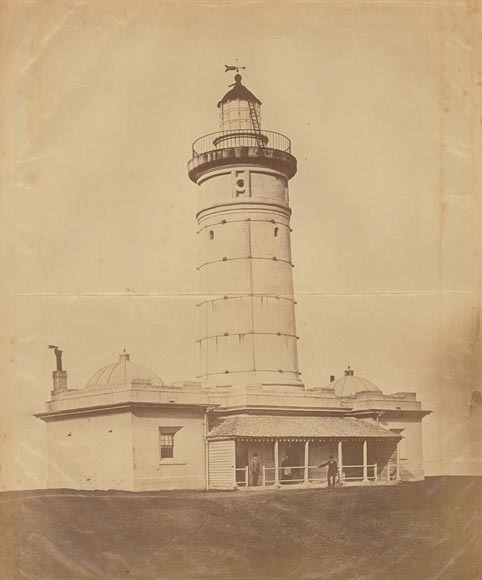
The first Macquarie Lighthouse, built 1816–18; photograph taken in the 1870s; from the 'Papers of James Barnet'

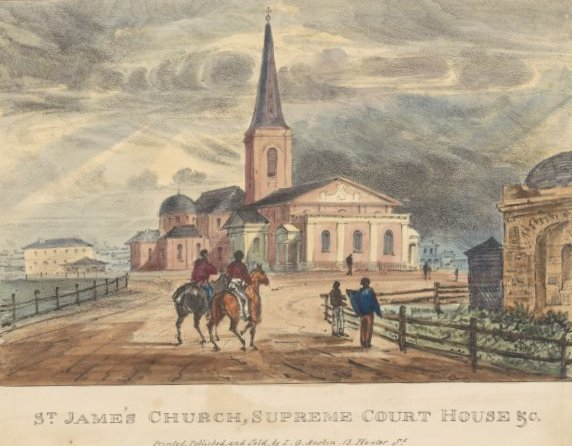
Lithograph of St James Church c. 1836 by Robert Russell

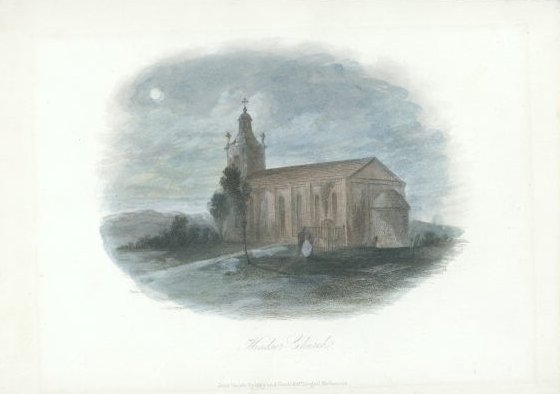
Engraving of St Matthew's Church, Windsor

=== Colonial architects 1822–1835 ===
Leaders of the free settler community in New South Wales, such as Wentworth and Macarthur, complained to London about Macquarie's policies, and in 1819 the government appointed an English judge, John Bigge, to visit New South Wales and report on its administration. Bigge generally agreed with the settlers' criticisms, and elements of his reports criticised Governor Macquarie's administration including his excessive spending on public works. Bigge's reports on the colony led to Macquarie's resignation in 1821.

When Macquarie returned to England in February 1822, Greenway was without his patron and on 15 November 1822, the recently appointed Governor Brisbane dismissed him from the office of Civil Architect.

Brisbane's two replacement appointees lasted only short terms. Governor Darling arrived in December 1825 and dismissed the incumbent architect, George Cookney, a few months later. Darling left the position of Civil Architect vacant for the term of his governorship while he continued the process of reviewing the structure and roles of the Departments that made up the Public Service.

Governor Bourke succeeded Darling in 1831. Bourke initiated a major enquiry into the Department of Public Works and suspended its director, Charles Wilson. Bourke had received numerous allegations anonymously against Wilson and the department. Wilson was dismissed and following him, six of the next top officers were also dismissed. In effect, the Department of Public Works ceased to function on the date of those dismissals, 13 March 1832.

Bourke established the Colonial Architect's Department in 1832 to be responsible for the planning and supervision of the construction and repair of public buildings. In general, the Colonial Architect's Department had charge of public buildings and their furniture, the duty of preparing plans and specifications for construction and repair and superintending all works executed by contract. From 1833 to 1835 the department briefly became the Architectural Branch of the Department of the Surveyor General before the Colonial Architect's Department was again separately established.

==== Standish Lawrence Harris (1822–1824) ====
To replace Greenway, Brisbane appointed Standish Lawrence Harris, a recently arrived free settler as Civil Architect in late 1822. Harris' main achievement seems to be in preparing a report on the condition of the Colony's public buildings requested by the Governor. Harris criticised his predecessor's works. Governor Brisbane found Harris's fees to be excessive. The Civil Architect reported to the Chief Engineer, Major John Ovens. Ovens had stated that Harris' services "can no longer be useful to me" and Harris was dismissed in October 1824.

Other than his report on the colony's public buildings, Harris's possible contribution was the completion of the new Courthouse at Sydney begun by Greenway. Harris made enlargements and prepared drawings and specifications, but there is some doubt as to whether even his design was that ultimately adopted. Harris made recommendations about the organisation of the Office for Public Works and the role of the Civil Architect, which were adopted.

==== George Cookney (1825–1826) ====
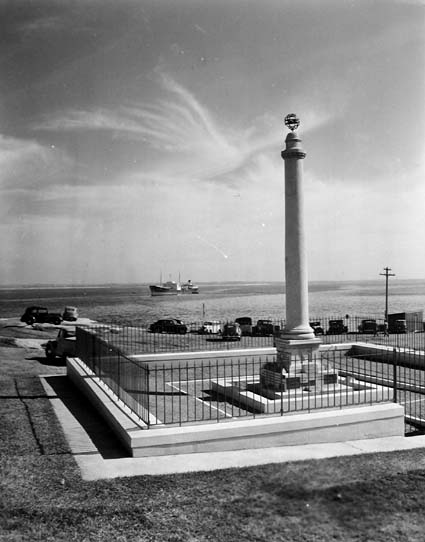
The memorial to La Pérouse on Botany Bay photographed 1954

George Cookney was an English architect, the son of D'arcy Wentworth's London agent. Cookney was sponsored by Wentworth and his son William Charles Wentworth. Governor Brisbane appointed him in April 1825, however, there were not a lot of projects he was asked to look at.

The only major work completed by Cookney was a memorial at the Sydney suburb of La Pérouse to Jean-François de la Pérouse, the French explorer who visited Botany Bay in 1788. The memorial was requested by Baron de Bougainville, the son of the more famous French explorer, Louis Antoine de Bougainville, who visited Sydney in 1825. At de Bougainville's request, Governor Brisbane directed Cookney to design both the monument and a tomb to be erected over the grave of one of La Pérouse's crew who had been buried at Botany Bay.

==== Ambrose Hallen (1832–1834) ====
From 1827 Ambrose Hallen had been the Town Surveyor within the Public Works Department. Within the Department of Public Works, Hallen took on the role of Architect and Town Surveyor under Charles Wilson, the Director of Public Works; under Wilson's directorship, Hallen having become increasingly engaged in minor architectural matters.

When Governor Burke succeeded Governor Darling in December 1831, he initiated an enquiry into the Department of Public Works. Wilson and six of those who were immediately under him were dismissed in 1832. Hallen was the next most senior officer and was placed in charge of what remained of the department on 1 April 1832; later that month he was given the title of Colonial Architect and his office was officially titled the Colonial Architects Department. The position as Town Surveyor was absorbed into the Surveyor General's Department (the role was filled by Mortimer Lewis who was later to succeed Hallen as Colonial Architect). In creating the Colonial Architect's role and department, Governor Bourke defied directions from the Colonial Office in Whitehall, London, which had specified there was to be no such office as an entity separate from that of the Surveyor General.

The new department only had 10 officers and was operating under tighter management following the review of the Department of Public Works. Hallen was not found to providing the necessary leadership and the office became part of the Surveyor-General's office under Thomas Mitchell.

Buildings include St Brigid's school at Millers Point. Hallen designed Berrima Gaol based on the radiating system of inspection. He also designed a courthouse at Berrima. However, the cost of building would have significantly exceeded the funds allocated. Hallen resigned at the end of 1834.

=== Mortimer Lewis (1835–1849) ===
Mortimer Lewis was appointed by Governor Bourke whose term was completed in 1837. He served also under Governor Sir George Gipps (1838–1846) and Governor Sir Charles Augustus FitzRoy (1846–1855).

In the mid-1830s there was seen to be an increasing need for new buildings relating to policing, including gaols, courthouses and lock-ups. Bourke negotiated with the Colonial Office in London that these buildings should be built by the Colonial Architect from the Colony's own resources and that this would give greater respect for the buildings, stating: "The attention of the Colonists will be called to them, an interest acquired in their preservation, which does not seem to attach to those works, which are defrayed at the cost of the British Treasury alone."

At the same time, responsibility for civil and military buildings was made separate. Accordingly, these roles reported direct to the governor. The Surveyor-General, Thomas Mitchell, would have supported the independence of Mortimer Lewis, who he had worked with while Lewis was Town Surveyor, and whom Mitchell had suggested would fill the role better than Hallen had. Mortimer Lewis was appointed Colonial Architect in April 1835. Final approval for the arrangements only came in September 1837, due to the delays in corresponding between New South Wales and England by ship.

One of Lewis's earliest works was the Darlinghurst Courthouse. It was significant as a building as it was deliberately built in the popular Greek style fashionable in England to convey a sense of the importance of purpose of the court house. He also managed the project in a more politically astute way by getting the government to approve sequential work rather than a single large intimidating budget.

Lewis produced courthouses at Goulburn, Bathurst, Berrima, and Hartley, and gaols at Berrima, Maitland, Bathurst and Goulburn. Most of these buildings were later replaced.

Under Lewis, the Colonial Architect's Department of Victoria was established at what was at first the new settlement at Port Phillip. The beginnings of the Colonial Architect's Department of Queensland also occurred under Lewis.

In 1843 there was a significant change in the governance of the colony of New South Wales as the first partially representative Legislative Council was established. The new Council was concerned to minimise expenditure and the appropriation of funds for public works was reduced with a consequent reduction of quality and output of the Colonial Architect's Department.

In 1844 the duties of the Colonial Architect were expanded to cover the role previously performed by the Colonial Engineer, that is superintendence of roads, bridges, wharves and quays. From October 1848 military buildings and works were also placed under the charge of the Colonial Architect.

Lewis resigned in 1849. Major works that Lewis mentioned in his resignation statement were six gaols, eleven Courthouses, the new Government House, the Tarban Creek Lunatic Asylum, later known as the Gladesville Mental Hospital, Customs House, the new Treasury building, the Post Office and numerous other buildings. He also included civic works at Circular Quay and at Newcastle and King's School, Parramatta.

His resignation resulted from an enquiry into the building of the Australian Museum. If Hallen had not resigned, it was quite probable he would have been dismissed also.

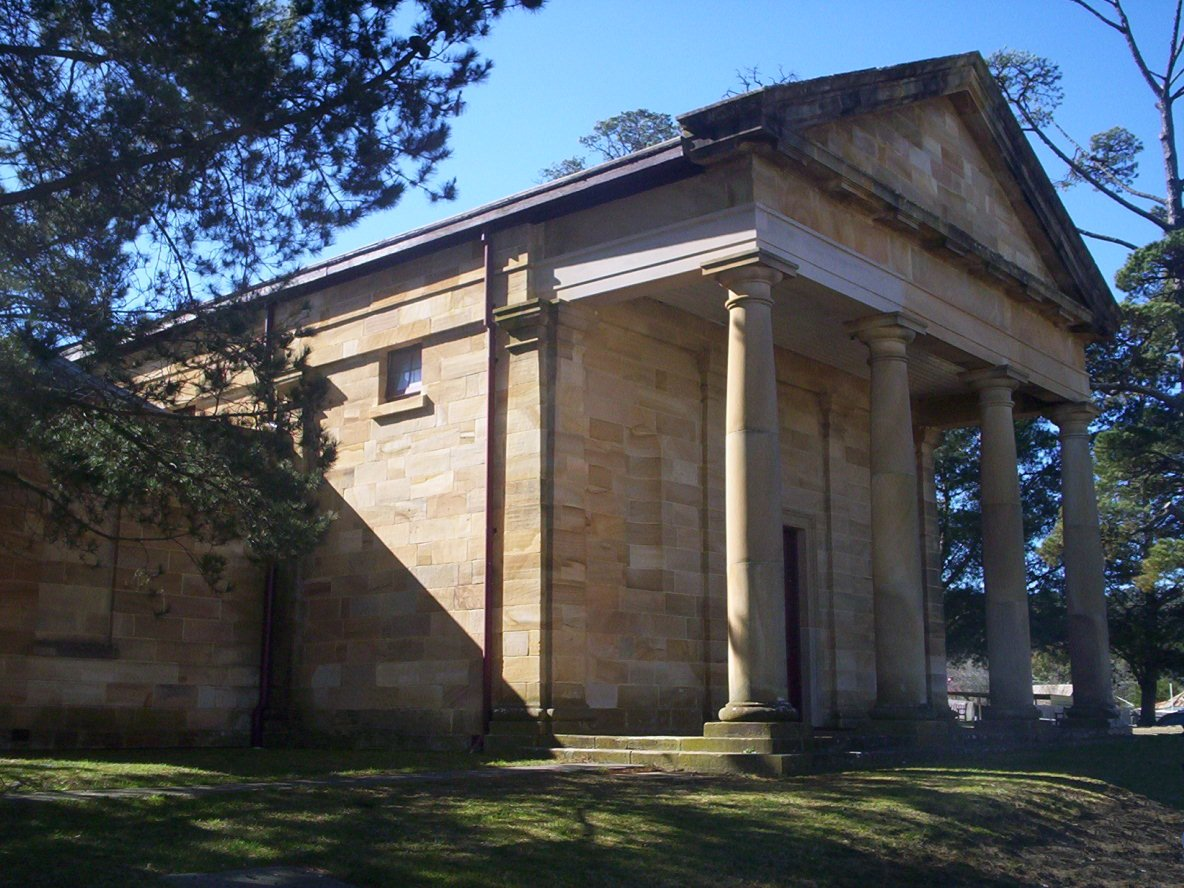
Court house at Berrima; completed 1838

=== Edmund Thomas Blacket (1849–1854) ===
Blacket was appointed by Governor Sir Charles Augustus FitzRoy (1846–1855), having previously completed a number of ecclesiastical commissions in the Colony, following his arrival from Scotland in 1842. Works by Blacket as Colonial Architect include the design of the Abattoirs (1850), the Water Police Office (1851), and Victoria Bridge in Maitland (1852). Blacket advocated the design of public buildings by competition among private architects.

Resigning in 1854, Blacket took up a commission to design buildings for the University of Sydney.

=== William Weaver (1854–1856) ===
William Weaver was appointed by Governor Sir William Denison (1855–1861), having left England in 1850, he commended duties in 1851 as Senior Foreman of Works under Blacket, and succeeded Blacket as Colonial Architect in 1854. Weaver submitted a design for the Government Printing Office in 1855 before being called to report to a Select Committee of the Legislative Council commissioned to inquire into the state of the Colonial architect's Department. Despite Weaver's protestations about a lack of resources impeding progress, the Committee reported:

"The Department of the Colonial Architect as now constituted, is not capable of dealing properly with the amount of work which the charge of public buildings alone would entail in it".

Weaver resigned under the Governor's displeasure in 1856.

=== Alexander Dawson (1856–1862) ===
Alexander Dawson, previously Clerk of Works in Hobart town under the Governor of Tasmania, Sir William Denison, was invited by Denison, on his appointment as Governor of New South Wales (1855–1861), to serve as Colonial Architect. His commission was later renewed by Governor John Young (1861–1867).

As a result of the formation of the first responsible government in New South Wales, from 1856 the Colonial Architect's Department reported to the Secretary of Lands and Public Works and from 1860, with the separation of Public Works from Lands, under the Secretary for Public Works.

Buildings undertaken by Dawson as Colonial Architect include Sydney Observatory and Sydney Registry Office and at least two lighthouses, Point Stephens Light and the Hornby Lighthouse.

Dawson was suspended for 3 months in 1859 for being absent from duty, and was replaced by his Clerk of Works. He resigned on 31 October 1862, and left New South Wales in 1864.

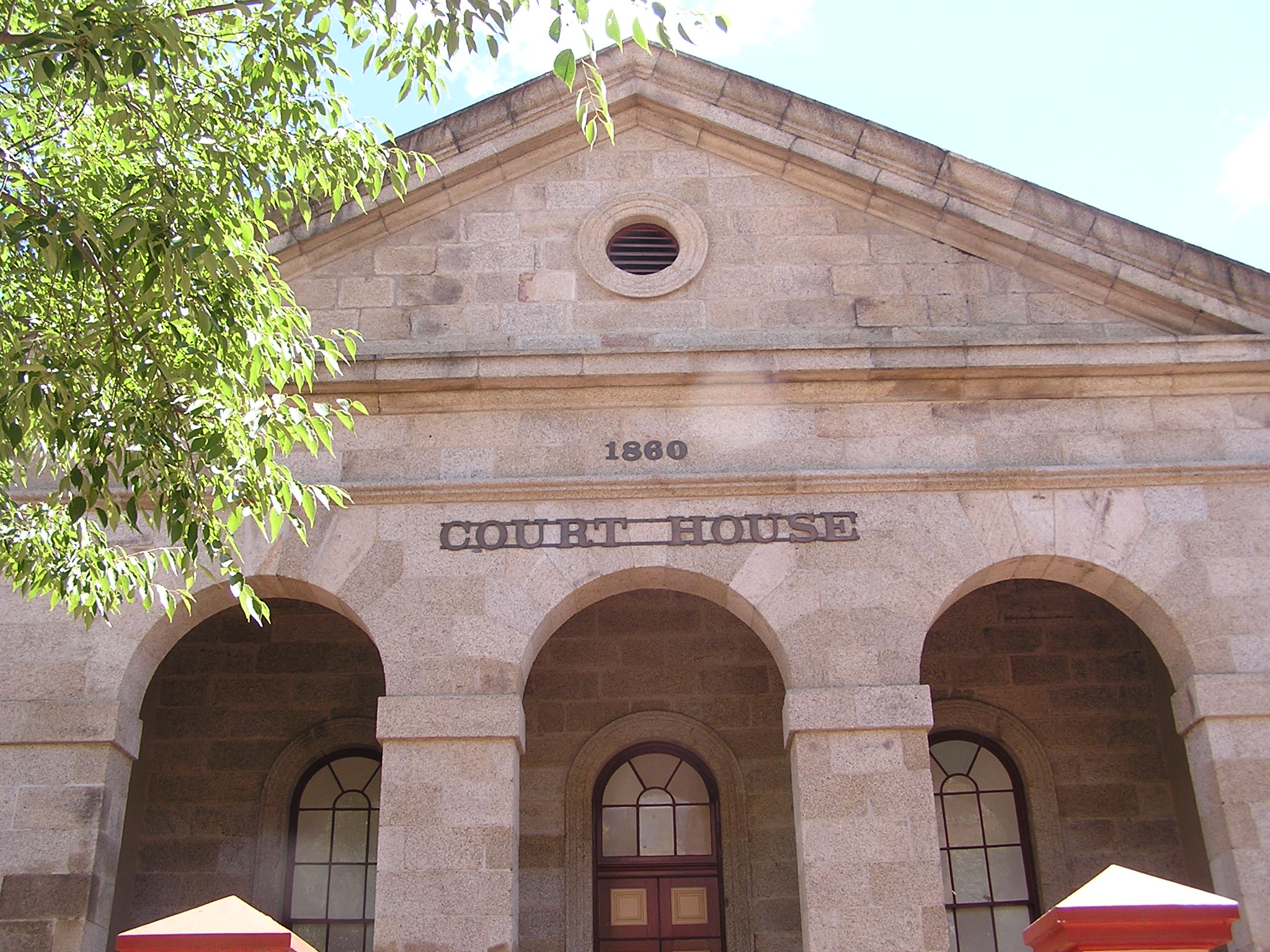
Albury Court House

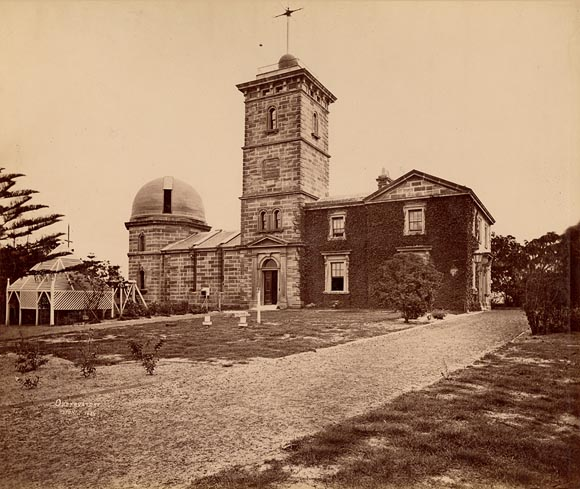
The Observatory, The Rocks, Sydney; photographed 1874

=== James Barnet (1862–1890) ===
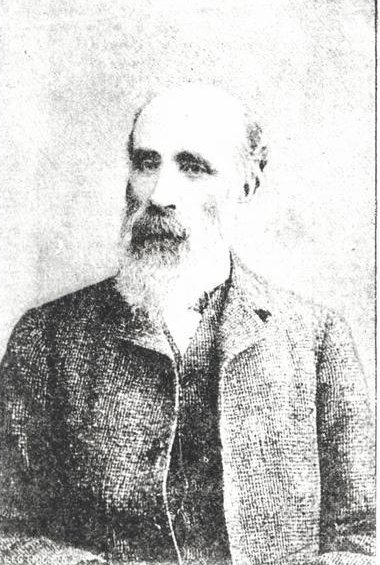
James Barnet

Barnet was appointed by Governor John Young (1861–1867). He served under Governors Somerset Lowry-Corry, 4th Earl Belmore (1868–1872), Sir Hercules Robinson (1872–1879), Lord Augustus Loftus (1879–1885), and Charles Wynn-Carington, 3rd Baron Carrington (1885–1890).

During Barnet's career, the Colonial Architect's office produced over 1,350 works. He listed on his retirement 169 Post and Telegraph offices, 130 Courthouses, 155 Police Stations, 110 lock ups and 20 lighthouses. One of Barnet's most impressive achievements was the Garden Palace, opened in 1879 as the venue for the International Exhibition of that year. The building was destroyed by fire in 1882. During his time as Colonial Architect there were 20 separate Parliaments, 16 Ministers and nine different Premiers. He made more visible impact on the colony than any other public servant of his time. Barnet resigned as Colonial Architect on 30 June 1890. Shortly afterwards the Colonial Architect's Department was abolished.

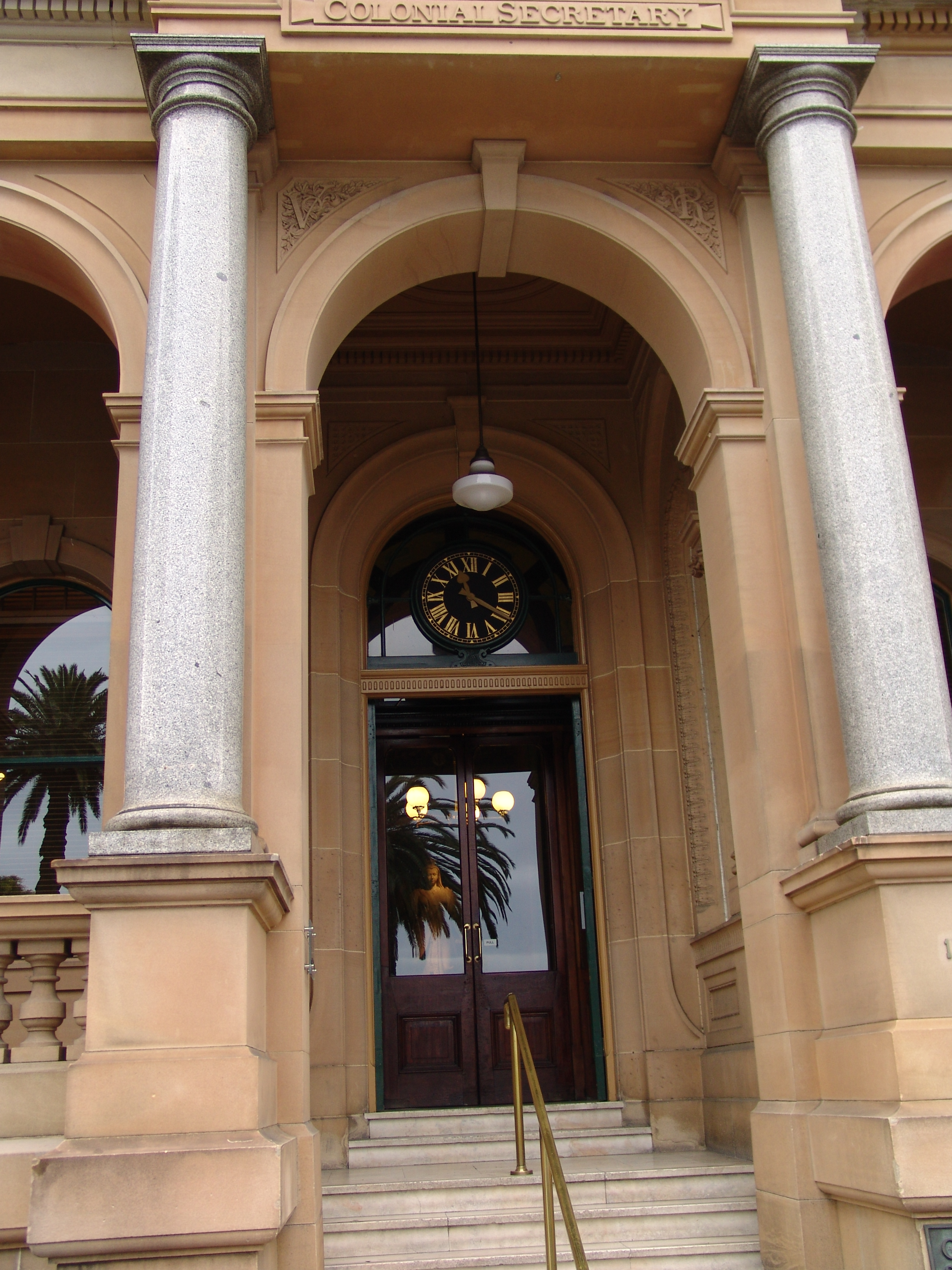
Chief Secretary's Building; constructed 1873–1880

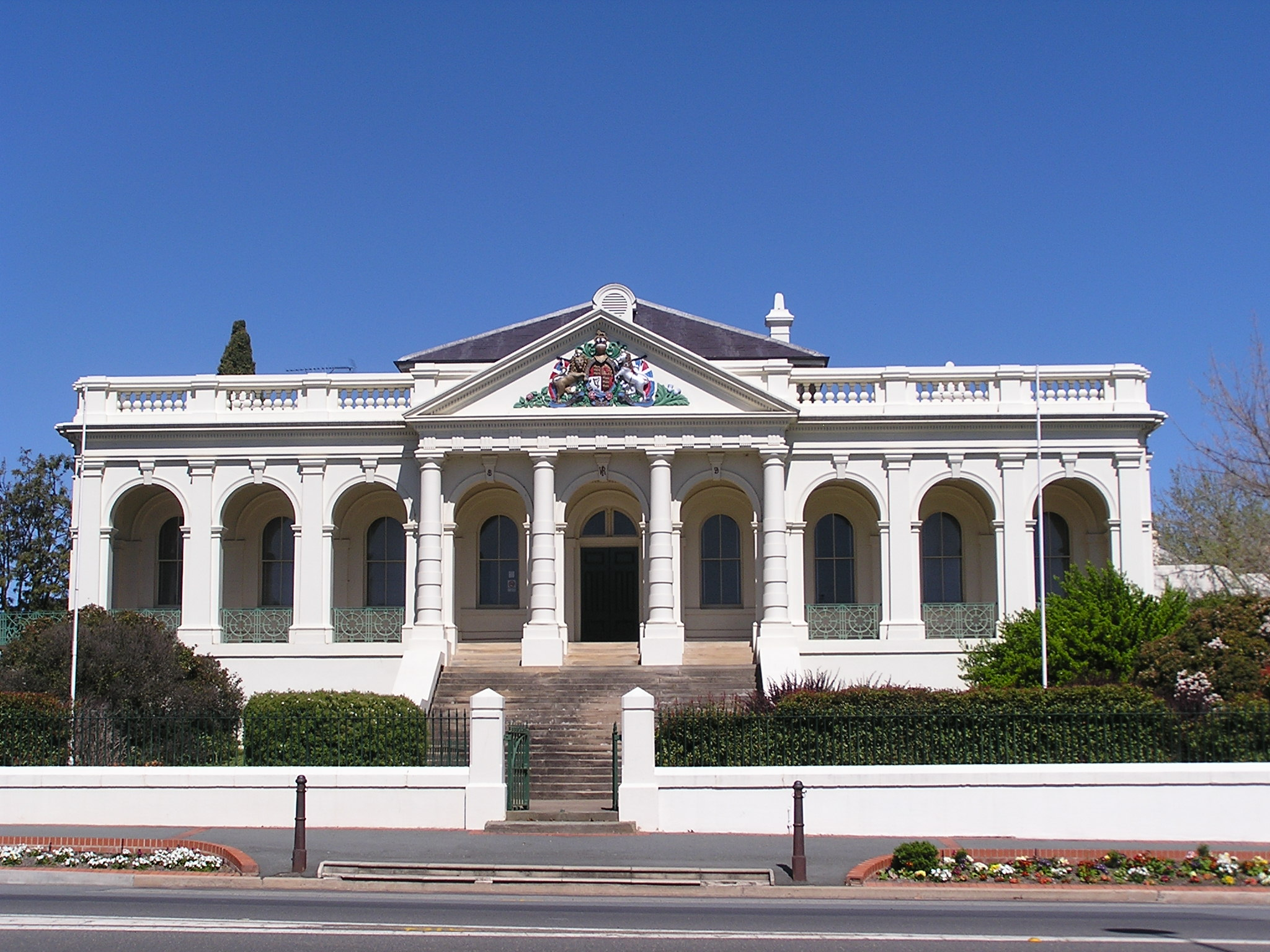
Yass court house; 1880

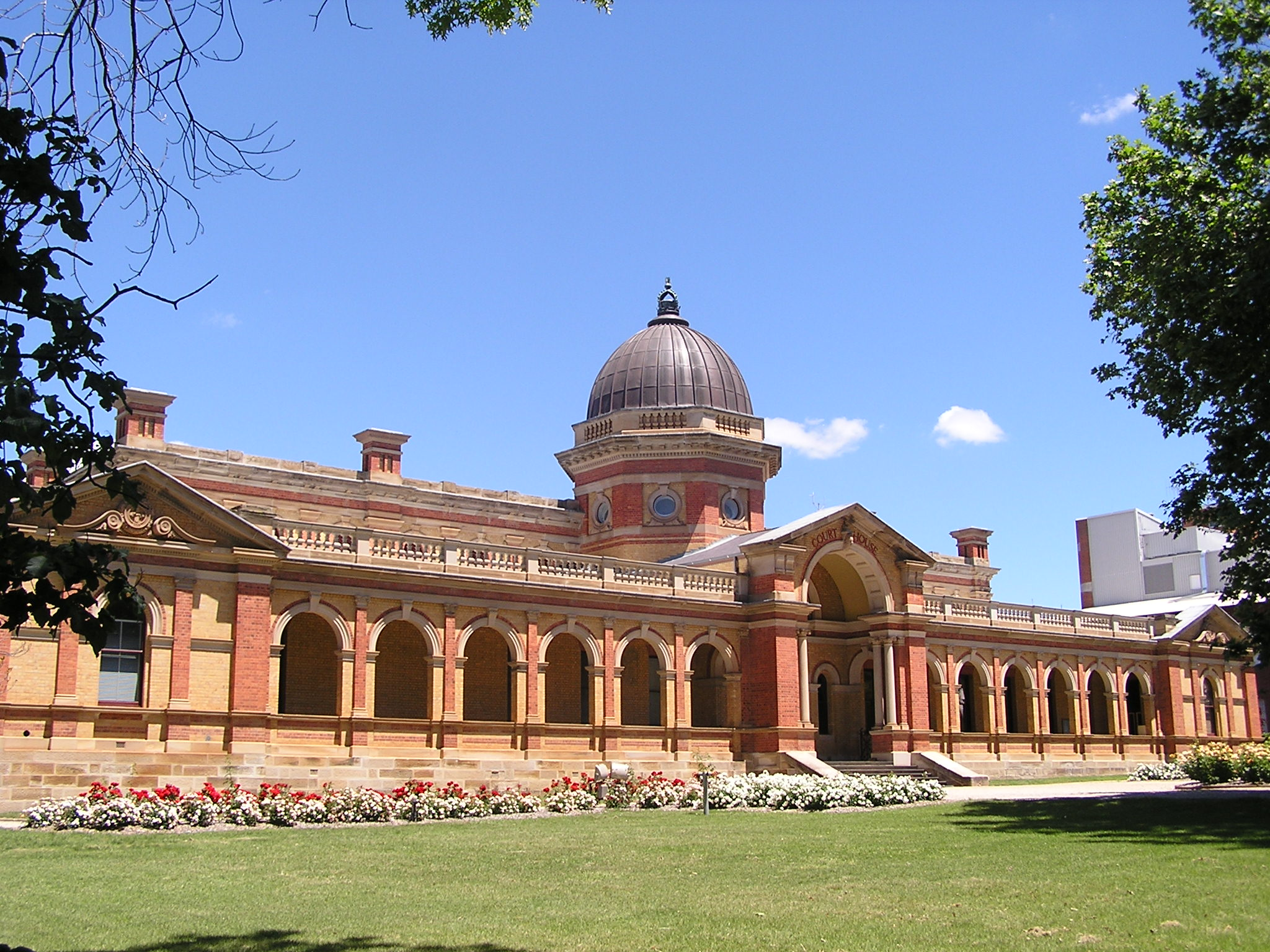
Goulburn Court House; Italianate style; opened 1887

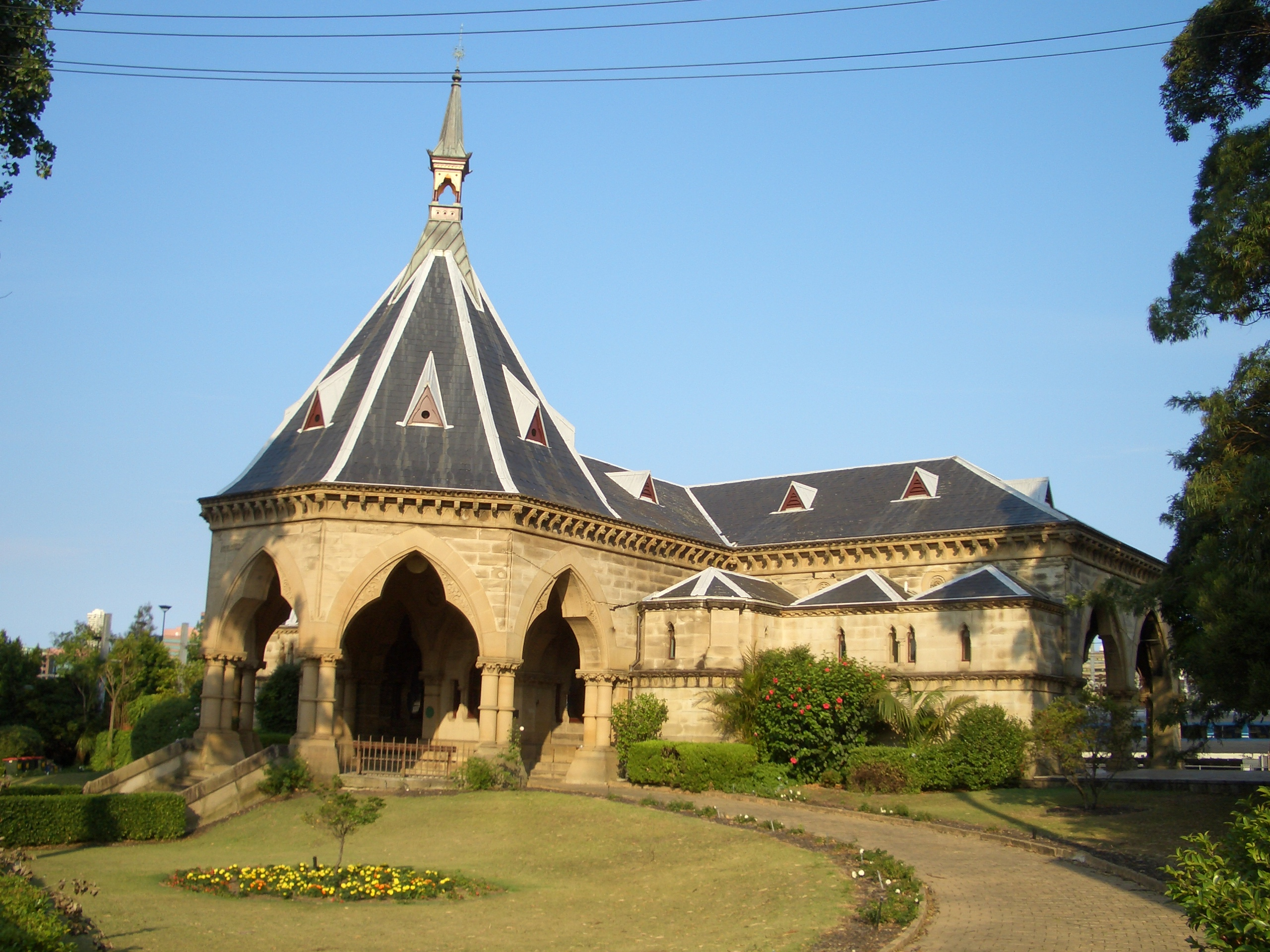
Mortuary Station, Central; opened 1869 and also designed Rookwood Cemetery station; opened 1864

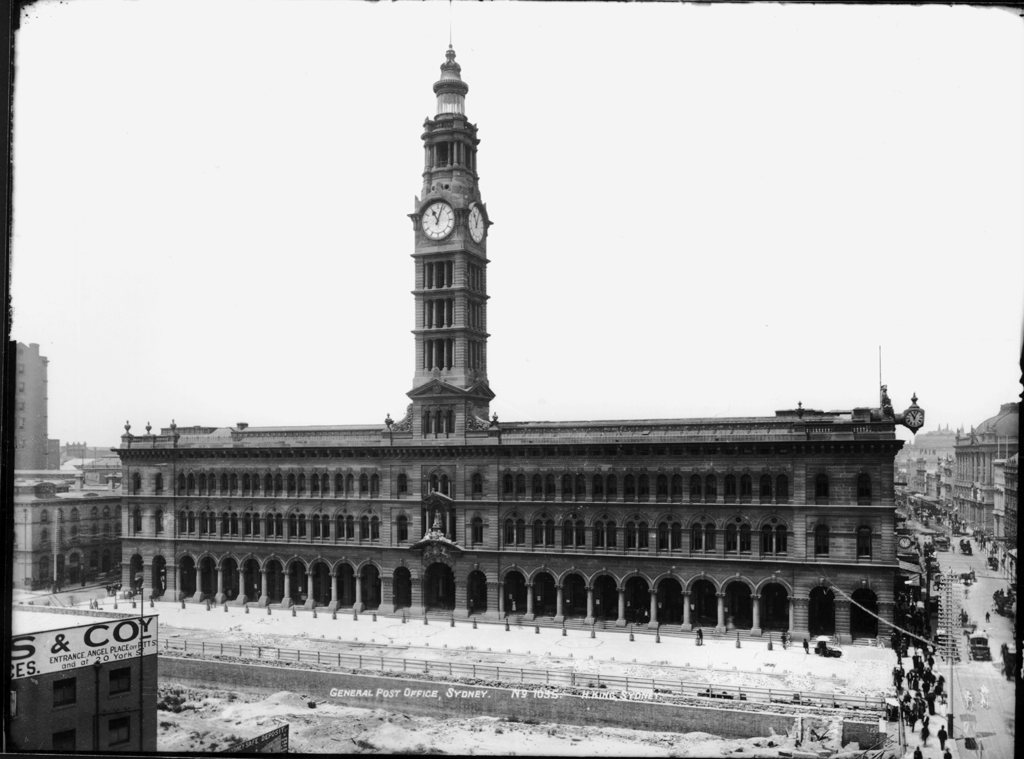
General Post Office, Sydney main facade (c. 1900); constructed 1866–1892

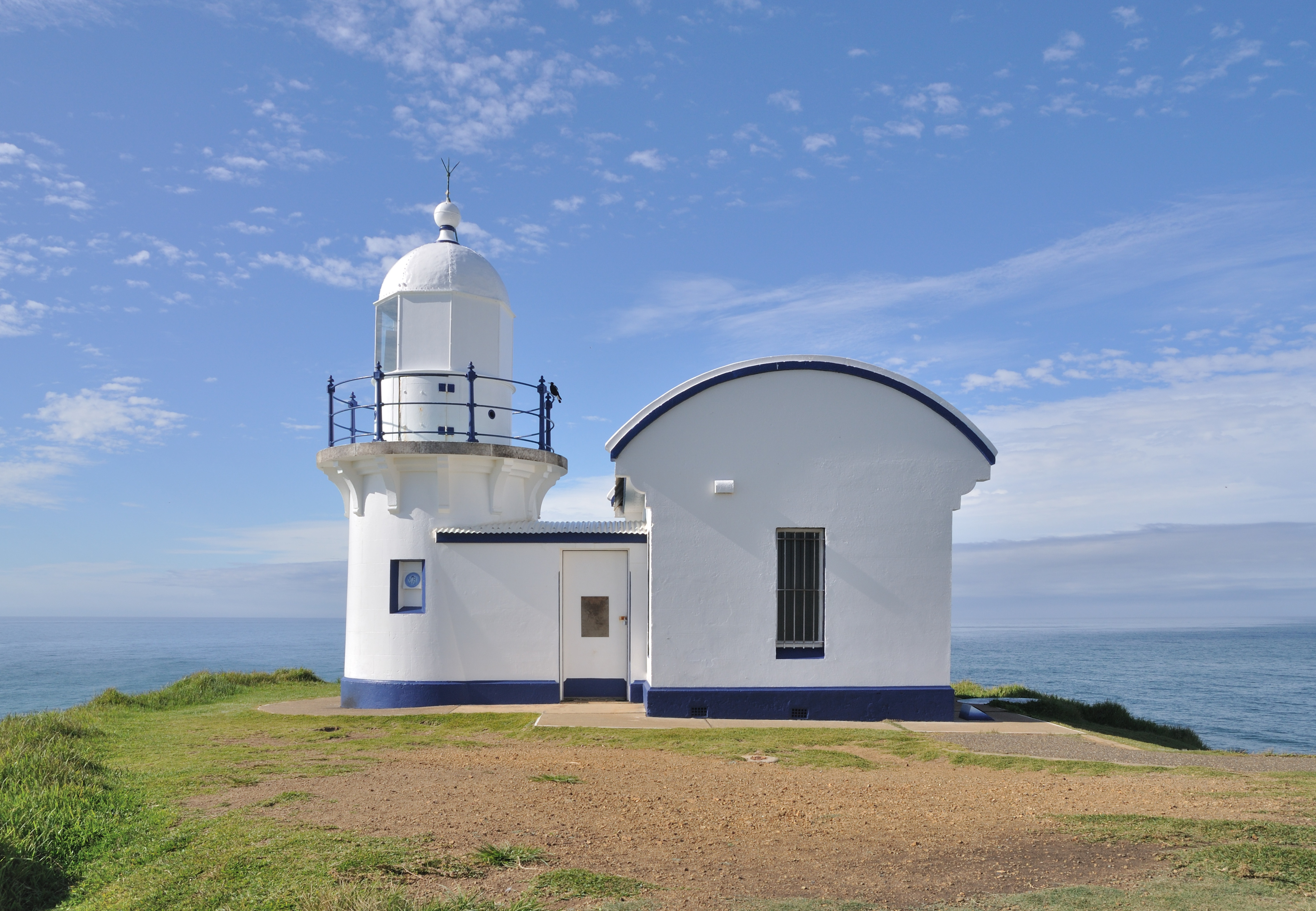
Tacking Point Lighthouse, south of Port Macquarie; completed in 1879

=== Walter Liberty Vernon (1890–1911) ===
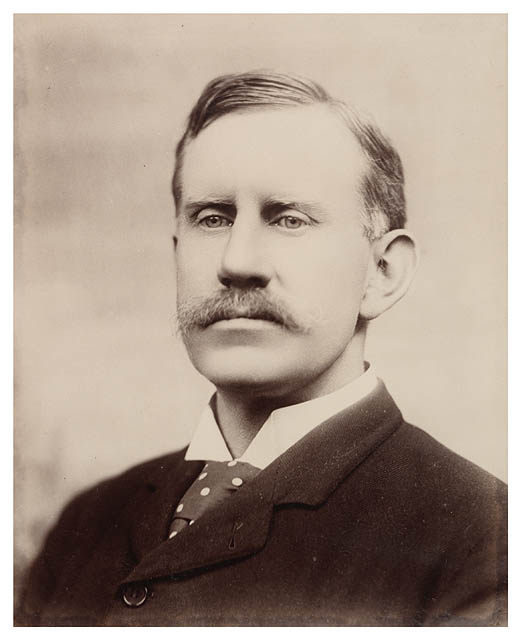
Walter Vernon

Vernon was born in 1846 at High Wycombe in England, and worked in private practice in Sydney before joining the newly named Government Architect's Branch in 1890 as Branch Head. Funds and staff were depleted for the first years of Vernon's term, until 1894, in response to the depression, the Government voted 136,635 pounds for the new building works.

Under Vernon's directorship the Arts and Craft style came to be used increasingly for public buildings. Notable examples include the fire stations at Darlinghurst and Pyrmont, as well as Post Offices and country Courthouses. Using the Arts and Crafts style meant these buildings were less monumental than those built by Barnet. However, Vernon also built a number of major public buildings, such as the Mitchell wing at the State Library, the Art Gallery of New South Wales, Fisher Library at the University of Sydney and Central railway station, Sydney. These buildings maintained the classical tradition. Vernon also added to a number of the buildings designed by his predecessors including Customs House, the GPO and the Chief Secretaries building.

The office under Vernon was responsible for the design and installation of the elaborate decorations and illuminations in the city to celebrate the Federation of the Australian colonies in 1900. Vernon retired from the position of Government Architect on 11 August 1911.

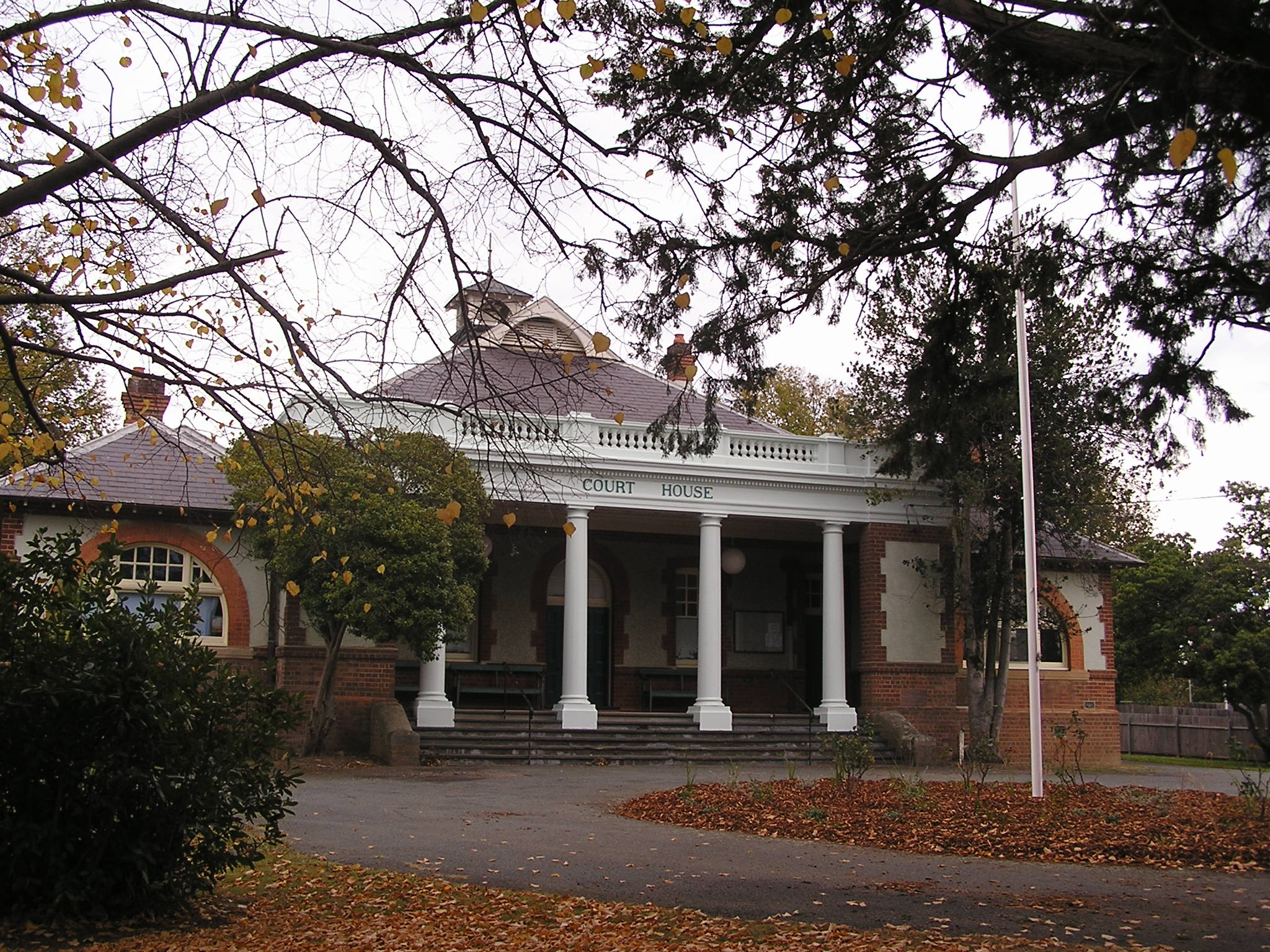
Braidwood court house; 1890

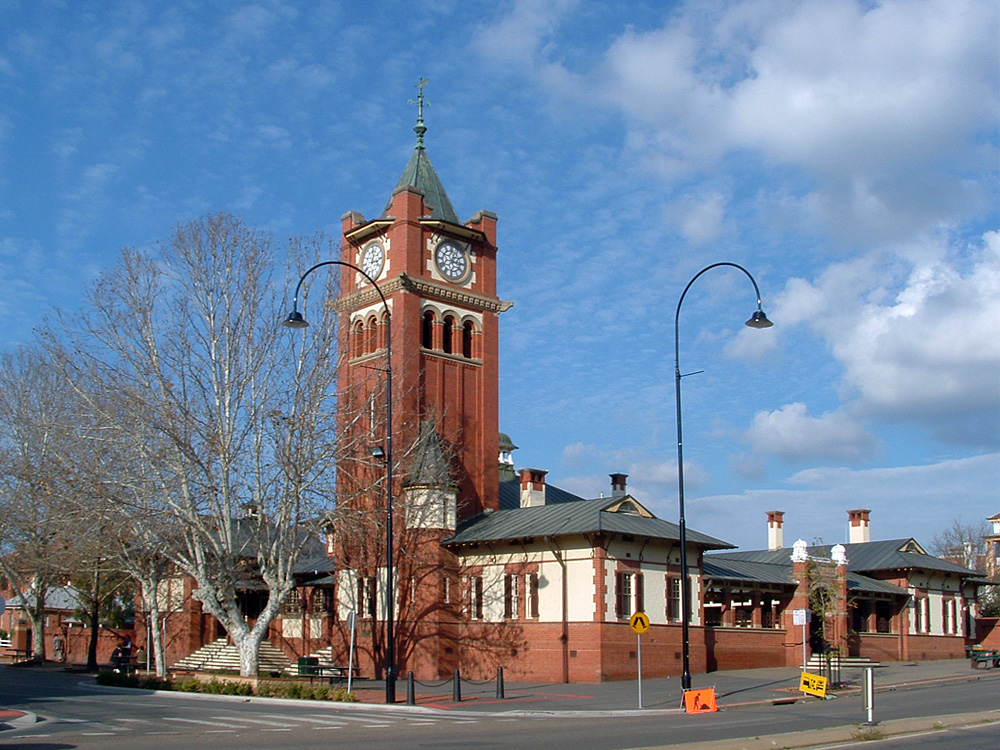
Wagga Wagga court house; built 1901-1903

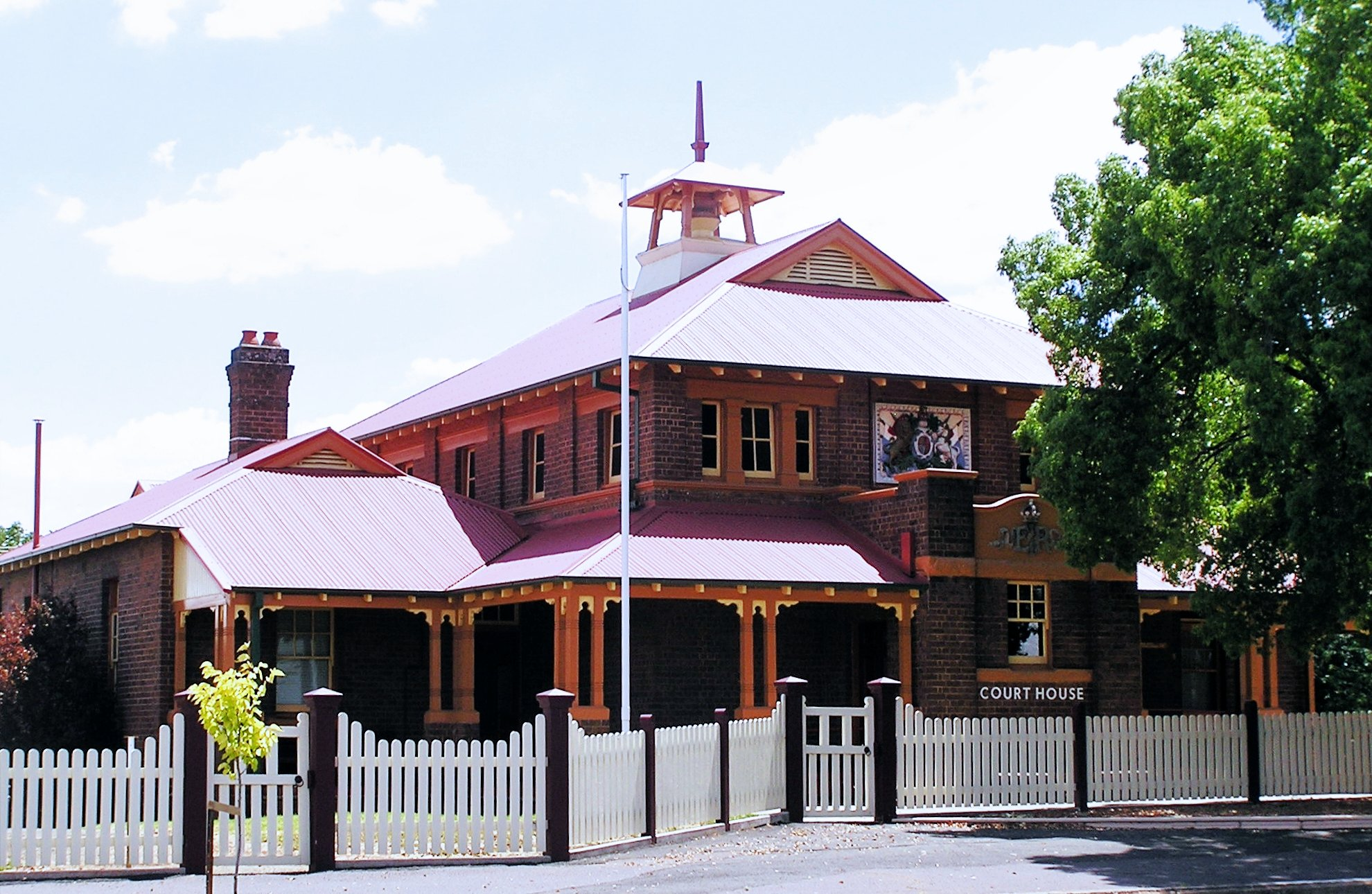
Temora court house; 1902

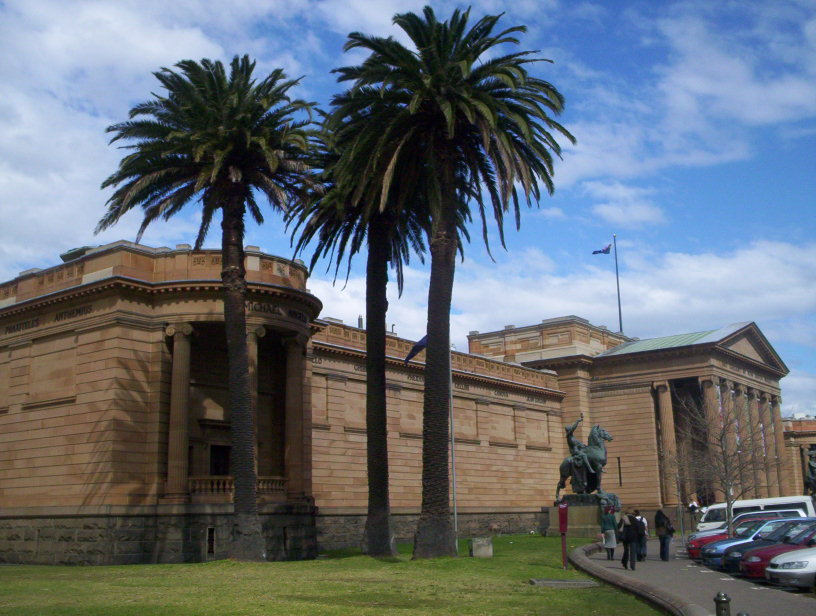
Art Gallery of New South Wales; built 1904-1909

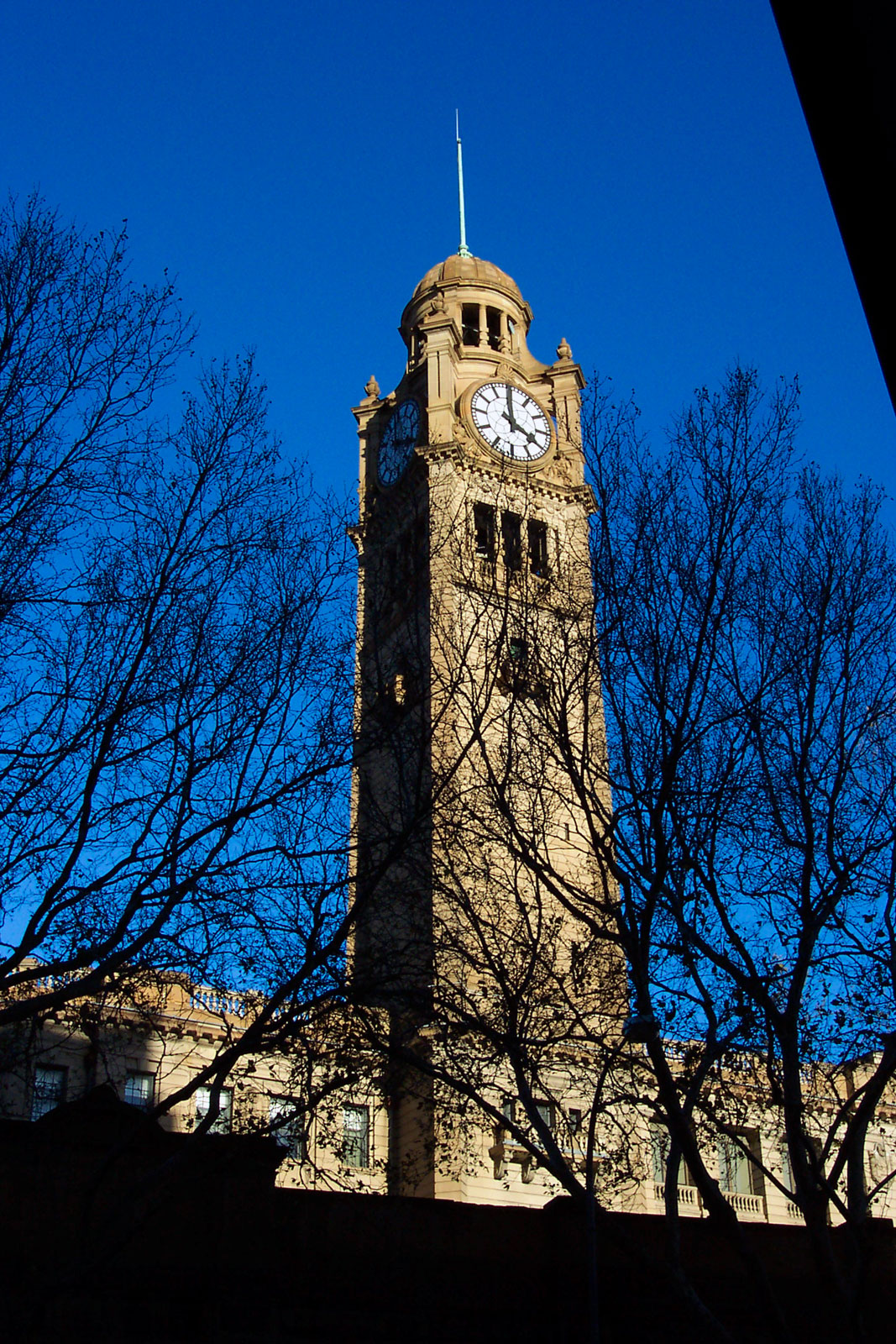
Clock tower of Central railway station, Sydney

== Government architects ==
=== George McRae (1911–1923) ===
George McRae arrived in Sydney in 1884 from Scotland and was appointed Assistant Architect in the City Architect's office. He became City Architect and City Building Surveyor in 1889, a position he held until 1897 when he was appointed Principal Assistant Architect to Vernon in the Government Architect's Branch. He succeeded Vernon as Government Architect in 1911 and held the office until his death in 1923.

Works undertaken by McRae during his term as Government Architect include: the Education Dept Building, Bridge Street (1912); Parcels Post Office, Railway Square (1913); Taronga Zoo lower entrance, top entrance, and Indian elephant house; Corporation Building, Hay Street, which is on the Register of the National Estate; additions to the Colonial Treasury Building in Bridge Street; Queen Victoria Building, George Street, also on the Register of the National Estate; and Cessnock Court House.

From 1912 until 1937 the Government Architect's Branch was housed in the "Tin Shed", a temporary building on the site of the first Government House and demolished in 1970.

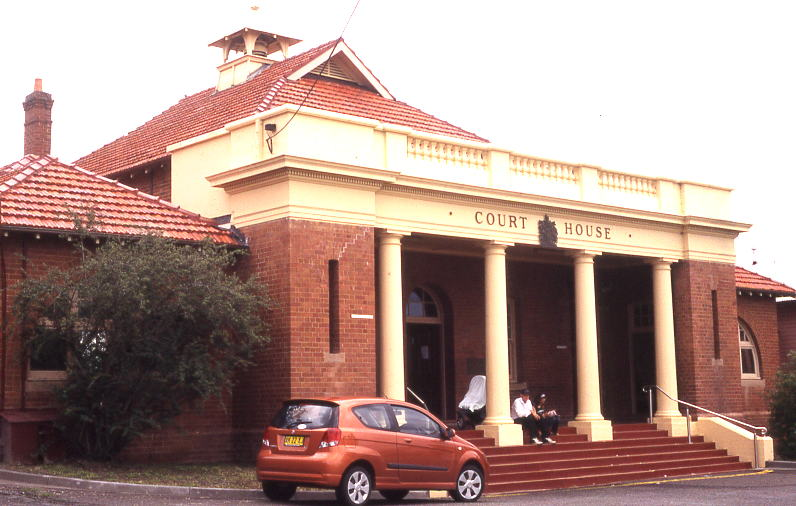
Cessnock Court House

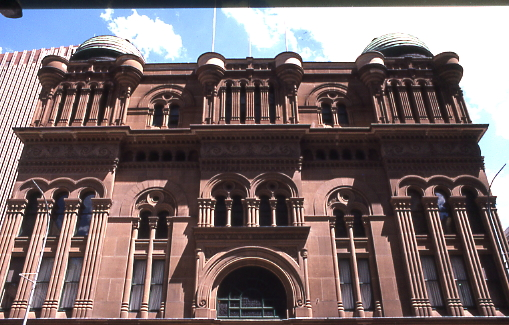
Queen Victoria Building

=== Gorrie McLeish Blair (1923–1926) ===
Blair, born 1862 in Scotland, entered the Government Architect's Branch in 1895 as an architectural draughtsman. By 1912 he had become First Class Assistant Architect in charge of the drawing office, and by 1916 Principal Designing Architect. Blair was appointed Acting Government Architect on McRae's death in 1923 and promoted to Government Architect in 1926. Blair was responsible for the design of several war memorials, additions to Katoomba Court House and Wards 24 and 25 at Callan Park Hospital for the Insane.

=== Richard Wells (1927–1929) ===
Richard McDonald Seymour Wells was born in Australia in 1865, and his promotion to Government Architect in 1927 made him the first Australian born architect to hold that post. Wells first joined William Kemp's office in the Department of Public Instruction in 1881, working on the design of schools. He transferred between the Department of Public Instruction and the Government Architect's Branch for a number of years as the responsibility for school design changed between departments.

Wells designed the conversion of the Old Stables to the new Sydney Conservatorium of Music in 1913, as directed by the Minister for Public Instruction. During Wells' term as Government architect, he supervised work on the Dixson Wing of the State Library of New South Wales, The Travers Building at Sydney Hospital, the Nurses' Home at Maitland Hospital and many additions to public schools. Wells retired as Government Architect in 1929.

=== Edwin Smith (1929–1935) ===
Edwin Smith, born in 1870 in Scotland, arrived in Australia in 1889, and worked as a draughtsman in the Queensland Department of Public Works and as Chief Architect in the Victorian Department of Public Works before being appointed Government Architect of New South Wales in 1929.

Smith reorganised the Government Architect's Branch in 1930 to absorb the Architect's Branch of the Department of Public Construction. During the 1930s depression, Smith initiated documentation for public buildings erected under the Unemployment Relief Council. Works undertaken during Smith's term of office include: the Blackburn building at The University of Sydney, Tea Gardens Court House, Quirindi Courthouse, Lismore District Works Office, and Lismore Police Station. Smith retired in 1935 and died in 1965, aged 95 years.

=== Cobden Parkes (1935–1958) ===
The youngest son of Sir Henry Parkes, Cobden Parkes had been employed in the Government Architect's Branch on the re-introduction of the cadet system in 1909. He enlisted in 1914 and, following a convalescence after the war, re-entered the office in 1920. Parkes was the first Government Architect to be fully trained within the office. Prior to World War II, Parkes fostered design changes in hospitals which continued in the expanded building program of the war years. Defence construction, including bomb shelters for public buildings was also a feature of this period.

In the decade of post-war recovery, the office used prefabricated aluminium buildings imported from Great Britain in the building of schools and hospitals. The range of public buildings broadened from the 1950s, with financial provision for a substantial increase in construction of educational institutions – universities and technological institutes and residential colleges – and in recreational and welfare buildings and markets. Parkes retired in 1958, almost 50 years after his appointment to the Government Architect's Branch.

=== Ted Farmer (1958–1973) ===
Edward Herbert (Ted) Farmer was born in Perth in 1909 and educated at the University of Melbourne, moving to Sydney in 1936 to work for Leighton Irwin, he joined the NSW Government Architect's Office in 1939 under a professional mentorship of Cobden Parkes and Harry Rembert. He was appointed Government Architect in 1958. Under his leadership the work of the Government Architect's Office flourished, winning the Sulman Medal on four occasions, the Blacket Prize twice and a RIBA Bronze Medal. Farmer himself was awarded the RAIA Gold Medal in 1972.

Notable buildings from Farmer's 16 years as Government Architect, with Harry Rembert as Chief Design Architect, were St. Margaret's Hospital Chapel and nurses' home, the Chemistry School and new Fisher Library at the University of Sydney, the residential colleges at the University of New South Wales and the University of New England, Belmont Primary School, Heathcote High School, Taree Technical College, and the Mona Vale Hospital. This was also the period in which the Sydney Opera House was completed.

Under Farmer, restoration and heritage planning achieved prominence as a function of the Government Architect's Branch.

=== Peter Webber (1973–1974) ===
When Geoffrey (Peter) Webber became Government Architect, the department was rearranged into six specialist sections; Schools, Health Buildings, Tertiary Education, Public Buildings, Special Projects and Services. The Special Projects section at this time was undertaking work at Taronga Park Zoo, Parliament House, Ryde Food School, the Art Gallery and Library of NSW.

The Special Projects Section included a Historic Buildings Group and a Landscape Group. At this time the Government Architect's Office was one of the largest architectural offices in Australia with a staff of 800 spread between Head Office and six District Offices throughout the state. Webber left the Government Architect's Branch in 1974 to take up a position as full-time Commissioner in the New South Wales Planning and Environment Commission.

=== Charles Weatherburn (1974–1978) ===
Charles Weatherburn's career with the Government Architects Branch spanned almost 40 years. He joined the Department of Public Works in 1938 as an architect and up until the outbreak of World War II was involved in hospital design. Four years in the army was followed by service in Narrabri, three years as District Architect in Cootamundra, eight years as Architect-in-Charge of the drawing office, Research Architect, executive assistant to the Government Architect, Assistant Government Architect, and finally as 18th Government Architect in 1974.

Charles Weatherburn had a close involvement with the Sydney Opera House, and contributed to the successful completion of the project. Other major projects he was associated with include the Institute of Technology, Goodsell Building, Mckell Building at Rawson Place, Parliament House, Westmead Hospital and an ever-increasing and highly sophisticated schools and building program.

=== Ian Thomson (1978–1988) ===
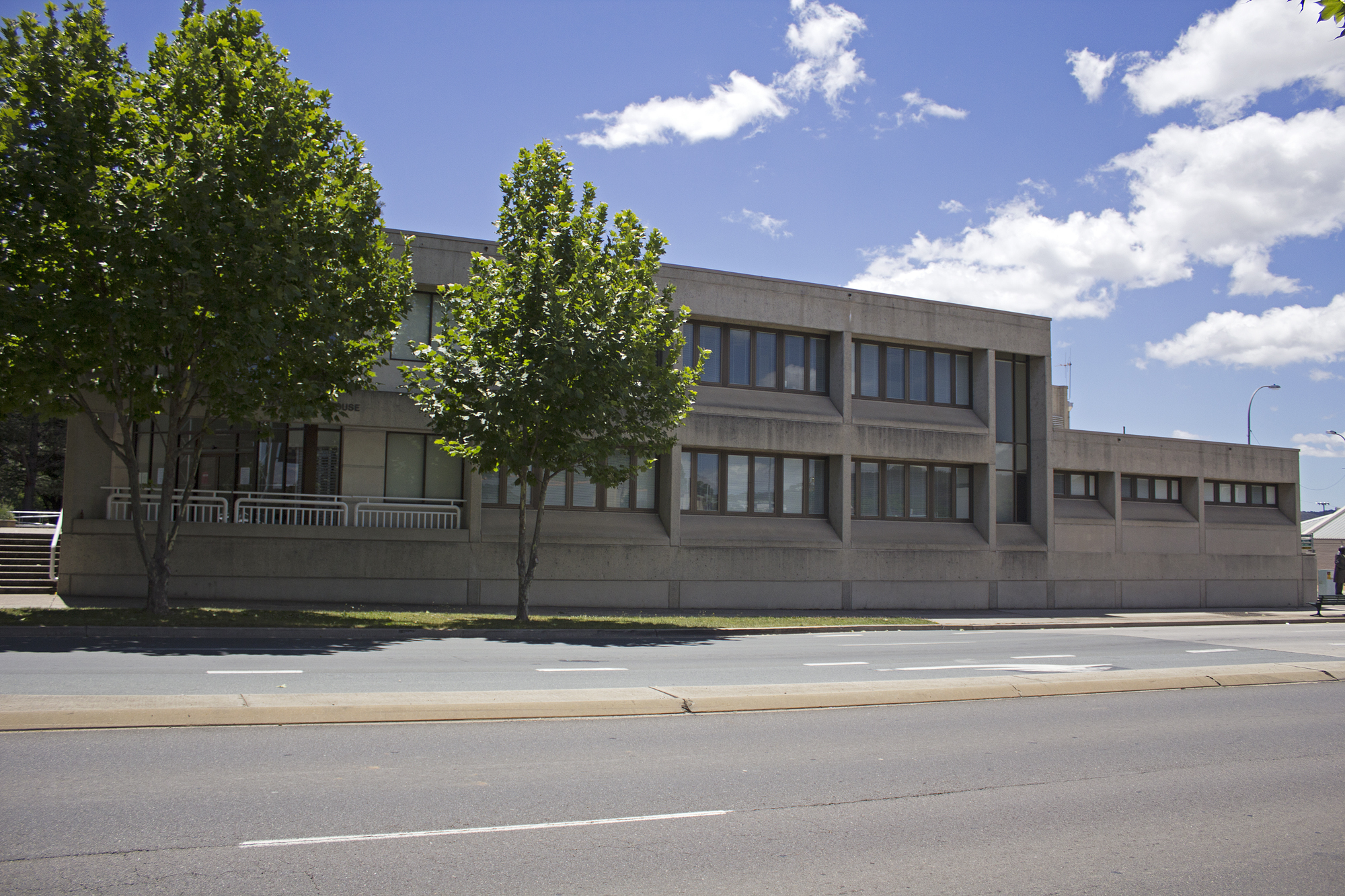
Queanbeyan Court House; 1978

John Whyte (Ian) Thomson OAM (1928—2011), was born in Lancashire in 1928, moving to Sydney in 1960 where he joined the Government Architects Branch of the Public Works Department in the same year. From 1960 to 1965 he assisted in the design and documentation of the Fisher Library at the University of Sydney.

In 1978 when Ian Thomson became the 19th Government Architect, he ushered in a period of unparalleled growth and building activity, which culminated in the completion of many projects for the 1988 Bicentennial celebrations. Work completed during this period includes: Powerhouse Museum, Riverside Theatres Parramatta, Ballina Police Station, new Parliament House Sydney, Western Plains Zoo, Gardens Restaurant in the Royal Botanic Gardens, the Federation Pavilion at Centennial Park, redesign of the foreshore areas at Circular Quay, Macquarie Street upgrade, and a wide variety of conservation and heritage work.

In 1987 the Government Architects Branch, first named in 1890, was renamed the Architectural Division of the Public Works Department. Ian Thomson retired as a Government Architect in 1988. In 2007 Thompson was awarded an Medal of the Order of Australia for service to 'architecture in New South Wales, particularly through the design and development of government schools and significant public buildings and spaces, and to the community'.

=== Lindsay Kelly (1988–1995) ===
Lindsay Kelly became the 20th Government Architect for New South Wales on 1 July 1988. Unlike many of the 19th century Civil and Colonial Architects, Lindsay Kelly brought to the position of Government Architect formal architectural qualifications of the highest order: a first class honours degree in architecture, a Master of Architecture and a Master of City Planning, as well as the 1984 Sulman Prize for the design of Parklea Prison.

On 15 November 1991, the Minister for Public Works announced that Public Works had been entrusted with a new Government Services Charter. Under this Charter, new responsibilities were given to Division Heads, and the title of Government Architect was changed to "Director of Client Services and Government Architect" to reflect the new responsibilities.

=== Chris Johnson (1995–2005) ===
Chris Johnson AO, the son of Peter Johnson (a former head of architecture at The University of Sydney and Chancellor of the University of Technology Sydney), oversaw the transformation of the office from a bureaucracy to an office run on a fully commercial basis.

In preparation for the Sydney 2000 Olympic Games he established a design review panel and a design directorate to oversee the design and procurement of venues and the public domain for Sydney Olympic Park and other significant projects.

Supporting the direct personal interest of Premier Bob Carr in improving apartment building design in Sydney, the Government Architect developed a Flat Design Pattern Book in November 2001. The Pattern Book displayed a series of case studies that exemplified good design of apartments. The design controls were then legislated through SEPP 65 Design Quality of Residential Flat Development in July 2002.

A range of important projects were designed in the office, most notably the Sydney Conservatorium of Music (2002), upgrade of Circular Quay (2002) and the upgrades of George Street and Railway Square (2000). Another major achievement was the Houses of the Future exhibition during the Year of the Built Environment (2004).

Johnson retired as Government Architect in July 2005, and went on to become executive director of the Department of Planning, and Chief Executive of Urban Taskforce, a property development lobby group from 2011—2019.

Johnson's tenure was not without criticism, given major opportunities for development of the city fringes at both Barangaroo and the former Carlton & United Breweries site at Broadway that, according to some critics, failed to lack vision. He is a major proponent of increased housing density.

=== Peter Mould (2005–2012) ===
Peter Mould (1948—2026) acted as Government Architect following Johnson's retirement in 2005 and was appointed as the NSW Government Architect and General Manager of the Government Architect's Office on 15 February 2006. Mould had extensive experience in both the private and government sector and experience working with government, industry and the design profession. Mould was the 22nd Government Architect in NSW.

Mould said in an interview broadcast in January 2012 that one of the biggest challenges was engaging with a shifting body politic having served, in his term, under five Premiers and six Ministers. The same interview also revealed Mould's interest in Islamic architecture[30] His works include Sydney College of the Arts, St Mary's Cathedral conservation; master plans for Circular Quay, Sydney Fish Market, Walsh Bay Arts Precinct; as well as schools, courthouses and police stations. In 2010 he established the Eminent Architects Panel for the Sydney Opera House to advise on architecture and design as it embarked on a major renewal program.

He served on the Central Sydney Planning Committee, the NSW Heritage Council and chaired its Approvals Committee, and was Deputy President of the NSW Architects Registration Board.

Mould retired as Government Architect in February 2012. He later concurrently sat on design advisory panels in five Australian States and Territories, and chaired major design competitions in Australia and overseas. He served as a Councillor for the International Union of Architects from 2014 to 2017. He was awarded the Australian Institute of Architects (NSW) President's Prize for his contribution to architecture in 2011, and was granted a Life Fellowship in 2012.

Peter Mould was diagonised with a brain tumour in September 2025, and returned to professional activities after treatment. He died in August 2026 following a recurrence of his illness.

=== Peter Poulet (2012–2018) ===
Poulet was the inaugural State Architect of Tasmania, serving from 2009 to 2012, after an early career in government and private practice in Australia and Japan. Born in Sydney in 1960, he completed his education at the University of Sydney before his appointment as Assistant Government Architect for NSW, then heading to Hobart in 2009 where he also lectured at the University of Tasmania. Appointed as NSW Government Architect and General Manager in January 2012, Poulet is a visual artist and he regularly exhibits modernist abstract paintings with strong references to the environment and nature. In early 2016, the Government Architect's role was relocated from the Department of Finance, Services & Innovation to the Department of Planning & Environment. As the 23rd Government Architect, Poulet provided leadership to NSW Government in architecture, urban design, landscape architecture and design thinking. GANSW became known as "support NSW Government in delivering quality, managing risk and fostering innovation to maximise public value of investment in the built environment."

In 2016, the Government Architect's Office (GAO) celebrated its 200th anniversary, with the role being created with the appointment of Francis Greenway in 1816 as the first Colonial Architect. To celebrate this milestone, a major exhibition was displayed at the State Library of NSW, titled Imagine a City: 200 years of public architecture in NSW. The GAO also presented a series of events and new publications during 2016, including a draft Architecture and Design Policy for NSW.

Poulet is the Deputy President of the NSW Architects Registration Board. Peter is also an established and prolific abstract painter. He has shown his work regularly at Watters Gallery, was represented by Christine Abrahams Gallery in Melbourne, and also shows work with Despard Gallery in Hobart. He has been honoured as artist in residence at Bundanon in 1999 and at the New England Regional Art Museum in 2002. He has pieces in the collections of the major law firms Allen Arthur Robinson and Naker and McKenzie, the University of New South Wales, Artbank, The Manly Hydraulics Laboratory, and the Bundanon Trust.

=== Abbie Galvin (2019—current) ===
Galvin was appointed the 24th NSW Government Architect on Tuesday 1 October 2019. Galvin is the first female NSW Government Architect in the roles 200-year history. Galvin has 30 years of experience, including most recently as Principal of BVN Architecture.

On 27 August 2026 it was announced that Galvin would become interim Chief Executive of Powerhouse Parramatta overseeing the project's completion only months before its anticipated opening. She replaced Chief Executive Officer Lisa Havilah who was stood down pending investigations into governance and procurement issues.

== See also ==
- Australian non-residential architectural styles
- Court houses in New South Wales
