= Landcom (New South Wales) =

State housing developer in New South Wales, Australia

- Landcom logo
- Type: State-owned corporation
- Industry: Land development
- Founded: 1976; 50 years ago
- Headquarters: 60 Station Street, Parramatta NSW 2150
- Area served: New South Wales
- Key people: Alexander Wendler (CEO); Ashley Mason (Chairman)
- Number of employees: 175 (2022)
- Parent: Government of New South Wales
- Website: www.landcom.com.au

Landcom is a New South Wales Government–owned statutory corporation that is responsible for the delivery of new housing to meet the needs of people in the Australian state of NSW.

As a State Owned Corporation (SOC), Landcom operates on a commercial basis with the power to undertake and participate in residential, commercial and industrial developments. Working on behalf of government, Landcom is tasked with expanding the stock of affordable and diverse housing for low-to-moderate income households by collaborating with landowners, the property sector, the community housing sector, and other partners in government.

In the course of its activities, Landcom develops strategic partnerships with:

- Community Housing Providers (CHP)
- Federal Government, including the National Housing Finance and Investment Corporation (NHFIC)
- Local Aboriginal Land Councils (LALC)
- Local Councils
- State Government agencies
- Other developers.

== Purpose ==
Landcom aims to increase the availability, affordability, and variety of housing options in NSW, by delivering sustainable, masterplanned communities.

== History ==
=== Formation, 1976 ===
Established by the NSW Government in November 1976, originally as the Land Commission of NSW, Landcom was tasked with the development of government-owned land and the delivery of new housing through the creation of masterplanned communities for citizens of the state of New South Wales.

The organisation's main purpose was to acquire land for present and future urban development and other public uses to help moderate the housing market, stabilise land supply and support the development industry with homesite sales to be made at the ‘lowest practicable price’.

=== 1977–1984 ===
On 23 April 1977, Landcom acquired and released its first land for sale, St Clair Estate in the Sydney suburb of Penrith.

Throughout the 1970s and early 1980s, Landcom worked with builders to create land and house package deals for prospective buyers. Landcom also advocated for rezoning and approval efficiencies to help stabilise the housing market and support industry.

=== 1985–1994 ===
In 1985 Landcom established a team to promote medium-density development. This involved expanding operations to land and house packages and joint-promotion schemes with builders, as well as new partnerships with major landowners and developers, with the objective to increase land supply. Landcom also advocated for coordinated infrastructure funding, subdivision standards, and planning and land consolidation efficiencies.

During the early 1990s, Landcom extended its focus to include sustainability, applying Ecologically Sensitive Design, providing community facilities and supporting community building. During this decade the organisation demonstrated urban infill and medium-density approaches in greenfield development to make effective use of infrastructure and address affordability.

=== 1995–2001 ===
In the mid-1990s, Landcom expanded operations from greenfield development to urban renewal with redevelopment projects in the inner and middle-ring suburbs of the Sydney metropolitan area.

In 1998, the organisation and its governance and operations were reviewed and an external Board was appointed by the NSW Government.

=== 2002–2008 ===
On 1 January 2002, Landcom became a State Owned Corporation under the Landcom Corporation Act 2001. During the 2000s, an important focus of the organisation was setting the highest standards in sustainability principles across its portfolio of projects.

=== 2009–2012 ===
After the 2008 financial crisis, Landcom worked with the then Department of Housing on social housing and infrastructure to deliver 1,100 new homes in two years, as part of the first tranche of the Nation Building Economic Stimulus Plan Social Housing Initiative.

=== 2013–2014 ===
In 2013, Landcom started trading as UrbanGrowth NSW. The new name corresponded with a change in direction resulting from a government mandate to shift from greenfield housing supply to a portfolio of seven urban renewal and infill programs.

=== 2015–2021 ===
In 2015, the organisation was tasked by the NSW Government to supply the equivalent of 20,000 new homesites over the following four years in response to Sydney's growing population.

In 2018, the NSW Government reassigned UrbanGrowth NSW's portfolio, with the retail land development portfolio remaining with Landcom. Henceforth, Landcom focused on creation of affordable housing models in partnership with Councils, industry, Community Housing Providers and landowners.

In 2019 the targeted 20,000 new homesites in Sydney was reached.

=== 2022 onwards ===
Landcom is continuing to improve the availability, affordability, and variety of residential properties in NSW. In September 2023, the NSW Government announced it would be providing additional funds to Landcom to speed up the delivery of new housing (including affordable housing) in order to address the state's housing crisis.

== Landcom Projects ==
Landcom has delivered more than 100,000 homesites over 220 projects.

The organisation's primary focus is increasing housing affordability, supply and diversity across metropolitan and regional NSW, and especially in greater Sydney, where population density is the highest.

Landcom unlocks surplus or underutilised government-owned sites or large institutional land holdings to create new infrastructure and communities that offer housing choice, community facilities, open spaces and access to services.

== Governance & Statutory Obligations ==
Landcom operates under the Landcom Corporation Act 2001 No 129.

Under this act, Landcom is constituted as a state-owned corporation with a set of commercial, social, environmental and developmental objectives that govern its functions.

The Landcom Housing Policy

Landcom also operates under an internally drafted Housing Policy (the Policy), which describes how Landcom will contribute to meeting NSW's housing needs.

The Policy:

- aligns with Landcom's principal objectives defined by the Landcom Corporation Act 2001
- directly responds to Landcom's Statement of Priorities, issued by Landcom's Portfolio Minister, the Minister for Planning and Environment.
- identifies the points of difference which define a Landcom community
- identifies objectives and commitments across six focus areas to ensure that the communities Landcom delivers ‘demonstrate leadership, showcase innovation and contribute to ensuring that everyone in NSW has access to safe, secure and affordable housing’.

== Organisational Structure ==
Landcom's Portfolio Minister is The Hon Paul Scully MP, Minister for Planning and Public Spaces, while the organisation's shareholder Ministers are the NSW Treasurer, The Hon Daniel Mookhey MLC, and the Minister for Finance, The Hon Courtney Houssos MLC.

Landcom's Chief Executive Officer is Alexander Wendler, who is responsible for the day-to-day management of Landcom and operates under a Board of Directors. The Board has ultimate responsibility for the performance and commercial success of Landcom and ensuring that it is managed in the best interests of the Shareholder Ministers and all stakeholders.

== Awards ==
The following major awards were received by Landcom between 2018 and 2023.

2023

Property Council of Australia Innovation & Excellence Awards

Category: Winner of the Diversity, Equity and Inclusion (less than 250 employees) Award

2022

Urban Development Institute of Australia National Awards for Excellence

Category: Winner of the UDIA National Award for Marketing Excellence

Project: Portman on the Park, Green Square Town Centre

2021

Urban Development Institute of Australia (NSW) Awards for Excellence

Category: Winner of the UDIA NSW Award for Marketing

Project: Portman on the Park, Green Square Town Centre

2020

Urban Development Institute of Australia (NSW)

Category: Winner of the UDIA NSW Social & Community Infrastructure Award

Project: Julia Park Reserve Youth Precinct at Oran Park Town

Urban Development Institute of Australia (NSW)

Category: Winner of the Diversity & Inclusion Award for Excellence

Australian Good Design Awards

Category: Winner of Good Design Award for Engineering

Project: Lachlan's Line Pedestrian Bridge

2019

Western Sydney Leadership Dialogue

Category: Winner of the Chairman's Prize for Social Infrastructure

Project: Newleaf project at Bonnyrigg

International Association for Public Participation Australasia

Category: Winner of the 2019 IAP2 Australasian Project Award for Indigenous engagement - award won with Dharug Strategic Management Group, GHD, Blacktown Arts (Blacktown City Council) and C3West (a program of Museum of Contemporary Art Australia)

Project: Consultation with the Dharug people on the future of the Blacktown Native Institution

2018

2018 Gresb Sustainability Benchmark

Category: Fourth place in the world and third place across Asia Pacific in the 2018 Global Real Estate Sustainability Benchmark (GRESB) Developer Assessment

Project: Sustainable Places Strategy

Western Sydney Leadership Dialogue

Category: Winner of the Outstanding Community Project of 2018

Project: Oran Park Library

== See also ==
- List of New South Wales government agencies
- Urban planning in Australia
- Department of Industry (New South Wales)
- Department of Regional NSW
