= UrbanGrowth NSW =

UrbanGrowth NSW Development Corporation
Agency overview
- Formed: January 2013
- Preceding agency: Sydney Metropolitan Development Authority
- Dissolved: 1 July 2019
- Superseding agency: Infrastructure NSW
- Jurisdiction: New South Wales
- Headquarters: 19 Martin Place, Sydney
- Website: www.ugdc.nsw.gov.au

UrbanGrowth NSW Development Corporation (known as UrbanGrowth NSW) was an agency of the Government of New South Wales, between 2013 and 2019. It replaced the Sydney Metropolitan Development Authority.

UrbanGrowth was an idea of the developer lobby group Urban Taskforce Australia.

Up until its abolition, UrbanGrowth NSW worked with government, private and community partners to facilitate economic development, including the renewal of urban places across metropolitan Sydney. The chief executive officer of the corporation was Barry Mann.

Following the 2019 state election, the activities of UrbanGrowth NSW were merged into Infrastructure NSW with effect from 1 July 2019.
