= Urban Taskforce Australia =

The Urban Taskforce Australia is an industry organisation representing property developers and financiers in Australia. It has been described in the media as one of the most powerful lobby groups in NSW.

In addition to property developers and financiers, its membership includes builders, architects, urban planners, economists and lawyers involved in planning and development.

It engages in the lobbying of ministers and senior bureaucrats, including through engaging with former politicians. Some formerly high-profile politicians that are associated with the organisation include Nick Greiner and Neville Wran.

The taskforce states its purpose as 'a forum for people involved in the development and planning of the urban environment to engage in constructive dialogue with both government and the community'. Its stated mission is to promote efficient planning and environmental laws, economic activity, and urban quality of life.

The organisation is frequently criticised by the Australian Greens for its lobbying to disempower local councils from planning decisions. It has been praised by that party for its stance on supporting a ban on political donations.

== History ==
The organisation was founded in NSW in 1999 when a group of property developers and financiers decided they had a different view of the planning system than other industry groups such as fund managers. The founding director was David Tanevski from KWC Capital Partners. It was launched by Bob Carr, an action that was questioned in parliament.

The organisation has since expanded nationally.

Since its inception the organisation has successfully lobbied for cuts of developer levies, exemptions in Sydney's growth areas from threatened species laws, and successfully lobbying for actions toward pro-development planning reforms.
