= Courthouses in New South Wales =

Courthouses in New South Wales were designed by the Colonial Architect, later known as the Government Architect of New South Wales, Australia.

== History of New South Wales Local Courts ==
The first New South Welsh Charter of Justice of 2 April 1787 created the power to convene a criminal court. This was the Court of Criminal Jurisdiction. The first Charter of Justice also created a Court of Civil Jurisdiction to hear and determine in a summary way all pleas relating to real and personal property, debts, contracts, grant of probates and to administer intestate estates. Magistrates appointed in the early years of the colony were unpaid honorary appointments. The first paid magistrate was D'Arcy Wentworth appointed in 1810.

Local Courts were known as Courts of Petty Sessions. Such courts had originated in England in the fourteenth century. Although during the early years of the colony references are made to Courts of Petty Session sittings by Magistrates, it was not until 1832 that Courts of Petty Sessions were formally established in New South Wales.

The first Courts of Petty Sessions were proclaimed in the Government Gazette of 3 October 1832. The proclamations gave notice that Courts of Petty Sessions were to be held at the following locations: Sydney (Police Office and Hyde Park Barracks), Inverary, Parramatta, Bathurst, Windsor, Newcastle, Penrith, Paterson's Plains, Liverpool, Maitland, Campbelltown, Darlington, Wollongong, Invermein, Stonequarry Creek, Port Stephens, Bong Bong or Berrima, Port Macquarie, Goulburn Plains.

More than three hundred courthouses have been built in New South Wales since settlement. The oldest existing Local Court in New South Wales is the Local Court at Windsor which was built in 1821.

In 1985 the Local Courts Act abolished Courts of Petty Sessions by changing their name to Local Courts and appointments are now made under that Act. There are currently 160 Local Courts established throughout New South Wales and 130 Magistrates appointed.

== Current role ==
Local Courts in New South Wales have jurisdiction to deal with:

- most criminal and summary prosecutions
- civil matters with a monetary value of up to $60,000
- committal hearings
- family law matters
- child care proceedings
- juvenile prosecutions and care matters
- coronial inquiries
- industrial matters
- mining matters

Local Courts also provide the following services:

- Court Registries administer the sittings of the Local Court and provide registry services to the Court's clients.
- The Chamber Magistrate provides information about legal options and court proceedings, but cannot represent people appearing before the Court. In smaller Courts, the Chamber Magistrate service is often provided by the Clerk of the Court.
- Coroners hold inquests into deaths and inquiries into fires. Outside the metropolitan area, most Clerks of the Local Court are appointed as Coroners for the State. Within the metropolitan area, appointed coroners sit at the Coroner's Court of New South Wales in Glebe.
- Marriage Celebrant: Clerks of the Local Court at most country registries (and some larger metropolitan registries) are authorised to perform marriages.
- Licensing: Most major country and outer metropolitan registries process applications for and issue certain licences such as a liquor licence or commercial agents licence.

== List of courthouse buildings of New South Wales ==
The following courthouses are located in New South Wales, with the Colonial Architect James Barnet and his office responsible for designing and building 130 courthouses across the state. Some of the courthouses designed by Barnet replaced existing courthouses where it was deemed the building had been outgrown:

=== Courthouses in current use ===
Suburb	Style	Completed	Architect	Image	Heritage registers	Significance	Notes
Albury	Victorian Free Classical	1860	Dawson; Barnet; Vernon		s.170 NSW State agency heritage register	Albury Courthouse is one of the few remaining buildings in New South Wales designed by Alexander Dawson. While small additions have been made to the rear of the building, the front remains relatively unchanged from Dawson's original design and is a rare example of his work. Albury Courthouse has been associated with the provision of law and justice in the town and broader region since 1860 and was the third courthouse built in the town. The scale and quality of Albury Courthouse demonstrates the confidence in the growing importance of the town as major port along the Murray River during the nineteenth century. Albury Courthouse forms an important element of Albury's civic centre and contributes to the streetscape of Dean Street. It was built out of local grey granite by Thomas Allen of Albury. In the press gallery there has been a tradition of journalists to carve their names. The first Clerk of Petty Sessions was John Roper, who had been a member of Leichhardt's 1844 expedition.	
Banco Court; Sydney CBD	Federation Free Classical	1896	Vernon		NSW Register; (Now defunct) RNE	The Sydney Supreme Court building (Banco Court) located at the rear of the Old Registry building facing St James Road has historic significance as part of the Supreme Court complex. The building has aesthetic significance as a fine and largely intact example of an early twentieth-century building in the Federation Free Style, and as the only courthouse in the city constructed in this style. The building makes an important contribution to the character of the immediate area, and with its small town scale blends well with the older buildings in the complex. The building has historic and social significance as part of the site. The site is significant as the location chosen for Macquarie's first Georgian Public School which was modified during construction to accommodate the Supreme Court. Representative of the style as used in a courthouse building and the quality of the interior detailing is representative of the importance given to judicial buildings at the turn of the century.	
Batemans Bay	Federation Queen Anne	1905	Vernon		Local	The first Batemans Bay Courthouse and Police Residence was opened in 1885 opposite the waterfront in Clyde Street. The building was gutted by fire in October 1903. The second Courthouse was built on the corner of Orient and Church Streets (now Beach Road), where the current police station now stands. It now houses the Old Courthouse Museum. It was constructed of hardwood weatherboard and roofed with galvanised iron. Local cedar was used for the door frames and mantelpieces. Built at a cost of £930 it was opened on 14 October 1905. The Complex is now operated by the Batemans Bay Historical Society as a museum. Although moved from its prominent location in the civic centre, the former court house and police station retains its high-level local historic significance for its role in establishing police operations and the administration of justice in Batemans Bay. It is also of significance for the continuity of a single process for just over 100 years. The building has local aesthetic significance for having been designed by eminent Vernon and for its characteristic domestic style, unusual for a building of its type and function in the local Batemans Bay area. Some of the aesthetic significance of the building has been reduced with the loss of its tall chimneys, a characteristic of the Queen Anne style. It is of local social significance for its local area identification with the provision of law and order in Batemans Bay from the late 19th century. Scientifically, it has local significance for its potential to contribute to an understanding of the changes in the administration of law and order and of the lifestyle of police officers from the late 19th to late 20th centuries.	
Bathurst	Victorian Free Classical: Neo-Classical, with an octagonal Renaissance dome	1880	Barnet; Vernon		NSW Register; (Now defunct) RNE	The Bathurst Court house is one of the finest Victorian Court House buildings in New South Wales. Built as part of a precinct of Victorian public buildings, it is a landmark building prominently sited in the town centre of Bathurst. The building has a lengthy association with the provision of justice in the district. The wings, built as the postal and telegraph offices, were opened in 1877. The entire structure is 81 metres (266 ft) long and 45 metres (148 ft) wide. The west wing is now occupied by the Central Western Music Centre. The east wing is now the Historical Society Museum.	
Berrima	Colonial Greek Revival	1838	Lewis		Local	Designed with four Doric columns that support a Classical pediment. Built of sandstone, there were a number of problems during construction; the first architect had resigned and three builders were involved. The first quarter sessions were held at the courthouse in 1841. In 1843, the first trial by jury in the Colony of New South Wales was held here. The assize courts were only continued for seven years. In 1850 the district court moved to Goulburn. Minor courts continued at Berrima until 1873. Notable trials were of John Lynch who was hung for the murder of at least nine people, and of Lucretia Dunkley and her lover, Martin Beach, who were both were hanged in 1843 for the murder of Dunkley's husband. Dunkley was the only woman hanged at Berrima Gaol.	
Boorowa		1884			Nil	It is a symmetrical building with a distinctive double-height court room and Roman arches.	
Central Local Court House, Sydney CBD	Federation Free Classical	1892	Barnet; Vernon		NSW Register; (Now defunct) RNE	The Central Local Courthouse is of State historical significance as the first purpose built Police Court with the State Justice system and first petty Sessions Court. The building is a fine and intact example of a classically inspired public building designed in the Federation Free Classical style by Barnet, with construction supervised by Vernon. The building is an example of a court that operated in association with a police station and significantly has continued to operate with attached holding cells complex to present day. The Central Local Courthouse and holding cells are good examples of late nineteenth-century courthouse and prison environment that despite alterations and modification demonstrate certain design philosophies and standards of that time. The form and relationship of the holding cells are functional and reflect Barnet's preference to relate each building to its site and context. The design of the courthouse and its principal façade connotes typical characteristics of this type of building. The buildings remain as a good and intact example of a courthouse and associated facilities designed by the Colonial Architects Office and that demonstrate the growing affluence and prosperity of the time. Central Local Courts and Holding Cells are of social significance for their on-going association with the police, Attorney-General's Department, Department of Corrective Services, NSW Sherriff's office and all associated parties who have used the building for over 100 years. The building significantly continues to operate and is part of a network of Courts in the local area.	
Condobolin	Victorian Free Classical	1892	Barnet; Vernon		s.170 NSW State agency heritage register	The Condobolin Courthouse is significant for its long association with the provision of justice in Condobolin and has been in use for almost 120 years. The exterior appearance of the courthouse is an imposing example of the Victorian Classical style by Vernon. The courthouse is a landmark building in Condoblin.	
Cooma	Victorian Mannerist	1888	Barnet		s.170 NSW State agency heritage register	Cooma Courthouse is an exceptional, rare example of a Victorian Mannerist style courthouse, elegantly constructed of locally quarried stone. The building is one of the finest examples of courthouses designed by Barnet and displays the principal characteristics of his standard courthouse plan built on a grand scale. The courthouse features a grand projecting rusticated arched entrance and a finely detailed double-height court room with a coffered ceiling. The courthouse is set back from the street in formal landscaped grounds. Cooma Courthouse has been in continuous use for over 120 years, with only minor alterations since its construction. The grandeur and quality of Cooma Courthouse demonstrates the importance of the town as a regional centre and is symbolic of the growing confidence in regional centres during the nineteenth century due to expansions in mining and agriculture. A jail was also established in the Cooma in 1873. It has shuttered French windows and a front verandah.	
Cowra	Federation: Anglo-Dutch; Arts and Crafts	1880	Barnet; Vernon		s.170 NSW State agency heritage register	Cowra Courthouse has been associated with the provision of law and justice in the region since 1880 and dates from a key period of expansion of a major public works program in New South Wales during the last three decades of the nineteenth century. The building is a good, representative example of country courthouses in New South Wales and is a good example of popular architectural styles adapted for the local climate. Cowra Courthouse features dark red brick with contrasting cement moulding details and is located on a prominent corner in the town. A symmetrical building with a distinctive double-height court room and Roman arches, the courthouse has unusual gable ends.	
Culcairn		1926			Local	The establishment of a police presence in Culcairn was announced in the Wagga Wagga Advertiser on 17 January 1891. The police rented premises until a combined police station/courthouse and residence was built.	
Darlinghurst	Old Colonial Grecian	1844	Lewis; Barnet		NSW Register; (Now defunct) RNE	The Darlinghurst Court House and residence is the finest, and only erudite Old Colonial Grecian public building complex surviving in Australia. Commenced in the 1830s, it has a long and continual association with the provision of law and order along with the neighbouring Darlinghurst Gaol complex. The imposing sandstone building is prominently sited at Taylor Square. The Court House, designed by Lewis and built between 1837 and 1844, is the first purpose designed court house to be built in NSW. The pavilions on either side were designed by Barnet around 1886. The extension facing Victoria Street was designed by the Government Architect's Office and completed c. 1963. The central block was adapted from an 1823 design in Peter Nicholson's 'The New Practical Builder'.	
Dubbo	Victorian Free Classical	1890	Barnet		s.170 NSW State agency heritage register	Dubbo Courthouse is an outstanding example of Victorian Free Classical style architecture and a landmark building in the town. The courthouse is a building of high quality design and composition, with matching cells and residence of equal quality, and an outstanding example of courthouses designed by Barnet. The intactness of the entire Dubbo Courthouse complex, including grounds, fences and gates, ancillary buildings and imposing courthouse, and its relationship to the neighbouring jail, is rare in NSW. Dubbo Courthouse has been associated with the provision of law and justice in the town and broader region since 1890. The scale and grandeur of the courthouse is symbolic of the growing importance of regional centres during the nineteenth century due to expansions in mining and agriculture, and the corresponding confidence placed in these towns by the Colonial government. The construction of the courthouse and neighbouring jail is also indicative of the wealth and importance of Dubbo and the broader region, while subsequent major extensions of the courthouse demonstrate the ongoing importance of the town.	
Dungog	Victorian	1849	Lewis; Barnet		Local	Original building originally L-shape with front projecting out. Attractive Victorian style public building with hipped corrugated iron roof and brick chimneys. Local brick stone sills. Concave verandah on side with thick, stop chamfered posts. No verandah on projecting front façade. Instead has three tall arched windows symmetrically places. This façade dominates. Upper pane mullions follow arched shape. Large carved brackets on eaves soffit. Otherwise detailing is limited. Extended both sides in around the early 1900s with further, more recent extension forming north wing. The police barracks were converted, replacing a previous 1836 courthouse. It has been much added to since but remains the oldest courthouse outside Sydney still in use.	
Forbes	Victorian Italianate	1880	Barnet		s.170 NSW State agency heritage register	Forbes Courthouse has been associated with the provision of law and justice in the town since 1880 and was the second courthouse built in Forbes that replaced an earlier construction, completed in 1863. The courthouse dates from a key period of expansion of a major public works program in New South Wales during the last three decades of the nineteenth century. The building is a good example of late Victorian Italianate architecture features arched window openings and an arched entrance portico to the central courtroom with a balustraded parapet at the roof line. The courthouse is a building of high quality design and composition and is located within the town's civic precinct opposite Victoria Park.	
Glen Innes	Victorian	1874; 1898	Barnet; Vernon		s.170 NSW State agency heritage register	Glen Innes Courthouse has been associated with the provision of law and justice in the town and broader region since 1874 and is the second courthouse built in the town that replaced an earlier construction, completed in 1859. The major expansion of the building at the end of the nineteenth century demonstrates the importance of Glen Innes as a regional centre. Glen Innes Courthouse is an impressive public building constructed in local stone and features a projecting entry porch with granite quoins and verandahs along the front façade. Glen Innes Courthouse is a building of high quality design and composition that forms an important element of the town's civic precinct. The first stage of the new courthouse was completed in 1874; and two new wings on either side of the courtroom and a new entry porch completed in 1898.	
Goulburn	Victorian Free Classical: with Palladian concepts and Mannerist influences	1887	Barnet; Rumsey		NSW Register; (Now defunct) RNE	The Goulburn Court house is significant as it is part of an intact Victorian civic precinct in a NSW regional centre together with Bathurst Court house, Goulburn reflects the development of the state in the late 19th century. Comparable developments include being at the end of an important rail line and the change in character of the towns from penal settlements to regional government administrative centres. The Goulburn courthouse and its setting is an expression of a cultural and developmental phase, embodying the confidence of the late Victorian era and is associated with the coming of age of the town, the lobbying for civic improvement and demonstrates an important phase in the town's evolution and development. The design is associated with and is a climactic work of Barnet and his team. The extravagance of the grand courthouses at Goulburn and Bathurst was never to be repeated after the 1890s depression and restructure of the Government Architects Office. It is both a representative and a rare example of an important Victorian courthouse with related garden. Other courthouses either never had substantial gardens or such gardens do not retain their Victorian character. The building is an accomplished example of Victorian Free Classical design demonstrating Palladian concepts and Mannerist influences. The architectural design shows academic excellence. The building demonstrates exceptional standards of construction in both materials and workmanship. The building contains the highest quality stone carving, bricklaying, metal and timberwork. The exceptional quality extends even to details such as ventilation and door furniture and to the fine structure which forms the dome. The Goulburn Courthouse garden enhances and is enhanced by the courthouse buildings and Belmore Park opposite. The courthouse garden is related to but, importantly, distinct from Belmore Park. Its formal character is emphasised by its separation from the street by fences and gates. The place has been in continual use for its original purpose since 1887 and for the foreseeable future.	
Gundagai	Victorian Free Classical	1860	Dawson		s.170 NSW State agency heritage register	Gundagai Courthouse is a good example of Victorian Free Classical style architecture and is located on a prominent corner in the town. The courthouse is one of the few remaining courthouses in New South Wales designed by Dawson. Gundagai Courthouse has been associated with the provision of law and justice in the town since 1860. The courthouse was the venue for the trial of the bushranger Captain Moonlite and his gang in 1879; and was one of the first stone buildings to be erected after the Gundagai floods of 1852. The interior, originally red cedar, was destroyed by a fire in 1943 and rebuilt with mountain ash. The monument in front of the building is a Boer War memorial.	
Gunning		1879				The courthouse was built onto the lock-up keeper's residence, which had been erected seven years earlier. It is a painted brick building with a hipped roof, clad in corrugated iron; the chimneys are topped by chimney pots. The front verandah has plain timber posts. The original cedar joinery on the inside of the building is intact. The double-height courtroom is flanked on either side by a single storey office wing (police station and office of the clerk of petty sessions).	
Holbrook	Victorian Regency	1873	Barnet		s.170 NSW State agency heritage register	Holbrook Courthouse and Residence is a modest and attractive public building without a uniform architectural style. The building features Art Nouveau influences in its front façade and Victorian Regency styles elsewhere. The courthouse and residence is one of the oldest public buildings remaining in the town and has been associated with the provision of justice in Holbrook since 1873.	
Hornsby	Georgian interwar	1925	G Long	s.170 NSW State agency heritage register	Hornsby Courthouse has been associated with the provision of law and justice in the area since 1925. The building dates from the interwar period, when few new courthouses were constructed in New South Wales. The residential scale and restrained materials and detailing of Horsnby Courthouse demonstrate the dignified, civic style of public buildings built by the Department of Public Works during the early twentieth century. The building demonstrates some simple Georgian Revival influences, evident in the arched brick detailed portico and restrained classical motifs and sandstone trim.		
Inverell	Victorian Italianate	1887	Barnet		s.170 NSW State agency heritage register	Inverell Courthouse is an impressive example of Victorian Italianate architecture and features many fine details, including round arched windows with key stone mouldings and an oversized clock tower. Inverell Courthouse has been associated with the provision of law and justice in the town since 1887. The scale and grandeur of Inverell Courthouse is symbolic of the growing importance of regional towns during the nineteenth century due to expansions in mining and agriculture. Inverell Courthouse is a landmark building in the town and an important element of the town's civic precinct.	
Junee	Victorian	1890	Barnet		s.170 NSW State agency heritage register	Junee Courthouse is a modest example of a late nineteenth-century country courthouse in New South Wales, with a plan typical of the smaller late nineteenth-century country courthouses designed by Colonial Architect James Barnet. Junee Courthouse has been associated with the provision of justice in Junee for 120 years, with only minor changes to its form since its construction	
Leeton	Interwar Stripped Classical	1924	McRae		s.170 NSW State agency heritage register	Though restrained in scale and materials, Leeton Courthouse is one of the finest examples of interwar courthouses in New South Wales. This period is characterised by modest public buildings that demonstrate the more inclusive, civic approach to governing and the administration of justice adopted by the NSW Government in the early twentieth century. The building is an outstanding example of courthouses designed by McRae. Leeton Courthouse has been associated with the provision of law and justice in the town since 1924 and is associated with the establishment and development of the town of Leeton, the first of the towns planned to house the workers and administrators of the Murrumbidgee Irrigation Area.	
Narooma	Inter-War Neo-Georgian	1934	Smith		s.170 NSW State agency heritage register	Narooma Courthouse is a modest building with a T-shaped layout typical of small country courthouses in New South Wales. The modest materials used in its construction demonstrate the harsh financial situation of the time. Narooma Courthouse has been associated with the provision of law and justice in the town since 1934 and was the second courthouse built in the town, with the first completed in 1882. It was constructed as part of a group of civic buildings, including a police station and residence, designed by Smith. The court moved from Eurobodalla to Narooma in 1895. In 2004 the courthouse was criticised as being the "smallest in the country". At that time eleven Aborigines were on trial over a claim on fishing rights based on cultural and religious practices. The case was being heard over several weeks and it was reported that "There is no room for the men to sit in court when researchers and members of the public are present. Apart from a small wind exposed verandah there is no other shelter. There are no interviewing facilities for their lawyers who are crammed into a room which can only be described as a dog box."	
Taree	Victorian Classical; Victorian Italianate(?)	1882	Barnet; Robertson; Vernon; Smith		s.170 NSW State agency heritage register	Taree Courthouse has been associated with the provision of law and justice in the town since 1882. The courthouse dates from a key period of expansion of a major public works program in New South Wales during the last three decades of the nineteenth century. The building is significant for its ability to demonstrate the ongoing importance of Taree in the region, with the building expanded to accommodate additional courts and offices throughout its history. Taree Courthouse demonstrates some elements of the Victorian Classical style, though the expression of this style has been lessened by successive additions and alterations, and demonstrates the work of three government architects. Taree Courthouse is a landmark building in the town and symbolises the authority and power of the colonial government and justice system.	
Temora	Federation Arts and Crafts	1902	Vernon		s.170 NSW State agency heritage register	Temora Courthouse is a fine and highly intact example of Federation Arts and Crafts public buildings designed by Vernon. The courthouse displays the principal characteristics of the standard courthouse plan, with a grand double-height central courtroom and single-storey wings on either side, and demonstrates the more restrained, civic style of architecture adopted for public buildings in the early years of the twentieth century. The courthouse was the second built in Temora, which has been associated with the provision of law and justice in the region since 1880.	
Tumut	Victorian Italianate	1878	Barnet; Vernon		s.170 NSW State agency heritage register	Tumut Courthouse is a modest example of the Victorian Italianate style, commonly used for public buildings constructed in NSW during the nineteenth century. The building has been associated with the provision of justice in the town for over 130 years. Tumut Courthouse is a representative example of the style of public buildings designed by Colonial Architect James Barnet and displays the principal characteristics of his standard courthouse plan, with a grand central courtroom and office wings on either side. The courthouse and adjacent police station (completed in 1874) are characterised by a hip roof and timber verandah posts.	
Wagga Wagga	Edwardian	1900			s.170 NSW State agency heritage register; (Now defunct) RNE	Wagga Wagga Courthouse is an outstanding example of Federation Free style architecture. The courthouse displays considerable ingenuity and innovation by Vernon in adapting the design of civic buildings to the local climate. The building features a range of unusual features, including an oversized clock tower, curved entrance steps and a layout that comprises a series of internal pavilions connected by internal courtyards and loggias. The main courtroom is particularly fine and features exposed brick walls and intricately carved timber joinery. The courthouse is a landmark building in Wagga Wagga, located on a prominent street corner, and makes a significant contribution to the streetscape. Wagga Wagga Courthouse is an integral element of the town's civic precinct. The scale and quality of the courthouse demonstrates the importance of Wagga Wagga as a regional centre since the mid-nineteenth century and was the fourth courthouse built in the town. A complex with massive square clock tower, belltower, cupolas, decorative iron work and cedar joinery and fittings. A police building and court premises were established in Wagga Wagga 1847.	
Windsor	Colonial Georgian	1821	Greenway; Barnet		s.170 NSW State agency heritage register	Windsor Courthouse is a rare surviving Colonial Georgian public building that originally dates from the early nineteenth century. The building has a fine and impressive form which uses an adapted Palladian plan to suit the Australian climate. It is of considerable historical, social and aesthetic significance as one of the earliest surviving courthouse buildings in Australia. The courthouse now [1967] ranks as Greenway's best preserved building. The Building and Maintenance Branch of the NSW Department of Public Works carried out restoration work in 1961 to remove unsympathetic rendering of the external brickwork which was an attempt to reduce the problem of damp. The building now stands in its original and unspoiled form in Windsor, the most prosperous and successful of the towns then founded by Governor Macquarie. The courthouse was insisted upon by Governor Macquarie, designed by Greenway (himself originally a convict) and built for A£1,800 by William Cox, using convict labour. It is a combination and the result of all the forces directly at play during the Australia's early development. The oldest existing local court in New South Wales. Cox later served at Windsor as a magistrate.	
Yass	Victorian Free Classical	1880	Barnet		s.170 NSW State agency heritage register	Yass Courthouse has been associated with the provision of law and justice in the town since 1880 and was the second courthouse built in the town, which has been an important centre for administration and justice in the region since 1836. The laying of the foundation stone for the courthouse was a major event, attended by the Premier at the time, JS Farrell, as well as the Minister for Public Works, J Sulterland and the Attorney General JS Foster. The size and extravagance of the courthouse demonstrates the wealth and importance of Yass during the nineteenth century. Yass Courthouse in an impressive example of the Victorian Free Classical style and an outstanding, representative example of courthouses designed by Barnet. The courthouse, which is located on a prominent corner site, is a landmark building in Yass. A court of petty sessions was first established in Yass in 1836.	

=== Former courthouses ===
Courthouse / Suburb / City	Style	Completed	Architect	Image	Heritage registers	Significance	Notes
Braidwood	Federation Free Style	1902	Vernon		s.170 NSW State agency heritage register	Braidwood Courthouse is a modest Federation Free style public building that demonstrates the dignified, civic style of architecture adopted by the Public Works Department under Vernon following the economic depression of the 1890s. The building has been associated with the provision of justice in the town since 1900, and though no longer used as a courthouse, retains a civic function through its use as government offices. The single-storey brick building is characterised by four Doric columns. The first courthouse in Braidwood had been built in 1837 by Dr Wilson. The courthouse ceased to hear proceedings in the 1980s and was converted to a police station and other government offices.	
Gundaroo		1875			Local	The Cork Street courthouse has a high solid high-ceilinged structure, and was in use until 1934. In 1940, it was sold to the Anglican Church and became St Mark's Church the following year.	
Kiandra		1890			NSW Register	The first courthouse was built in 1860 as part of the Police Commissioner's Camp. By the 1870s the building was being used as a barn. The second courthouse, which also served as the local lock-up and the police headquarters, was completed in 1890 and built from local basalt. Now used as ski-field accommodation.	
Liverpool	Colonial Georgian	1820			NSW Register	A single-storey Colonial Georgian style government building with hipped roof, with L-shaped plan, probably incorporating main block of convict jail built early 1820s. Sandstock brick construction on sandstone foundations with articulated sandstone quoins, decorative timber verandah with valance and iron roofs. Twelve pane double hung windows and four panel doors. Original structure appears altered and extended about 1855 using part of jail wall on south east portion of site. Two bays remain of impressive iron palisade with stone gate piers.	
Paterson	Neo-Classical	1863	Dawson; Lewis		Gazette NSW Statutory Listings	An outstanding building, historically and architecturally. Its elevated site gives it special townscape significance. A part of the town's character. An important element on the entry to the town from the north. Extensive alterations made between 1861 and 1863. Mounted Police were stationed at Paterson from 1863 and lived in the barracks upstairs. Paterson was the centre for administration of justice in the Paterson Valley until the Court of Petty Sessions was abolished in 1967. The courthouse was taken over as a museum by the Paterson Historical Society in 1974.	
Wollongong (1 Harbour Street)		1858	Dawson			The site of earliest Court house and lock up is of significance for Wollongong area for historical, scientific, and reasons of rarity. The site has the potential to contain further information on the development of Wollongong and the Illawarra from the earliest period of European settlement, and on the history of government's administrative and punitive functions. The site is likely to comprise evidence of permanent structures, including court house, commandants house and cell blocks and associated auxiliary buildings created as permanent structures from 1835 onwards, as well as evidence of a variety of earlier temporary structures dating from the early 19th Century. The building was used as a courthouse until 1885 then it was used as the Customs House until 1903. It was then used by the Commonwealth Government as the Army Drill Hall until 1973 and was then used as the Naval Cadet Hall. In 1999 the Naval Cadets relocated and the building was restored. The old courthouse is now used as a community hall and hosts weddings, art shows and community events.	
Young (9 Campbell Street)	Victorian Classical	1886			Local	Young's former courthouse is a fine example of a judicial building designed in the Victorian Classical style of architecture. Further, with its central, double height court room flanked by single storey office wings, the building displays the main characteristics of general courthouse design during a number of decades of the nineteenth century. The structure reflects the imposing nature of courthouses constructed during the Victorian era. The courthouse was built during the period of Young's consolidation following the town's initial history as a leading goldfield. Also, the building is associated with the hectic period of Public Works Department construction activity during the 1870s and 1880s when courthouses were often impressive structures built sometimes without adequate regard for the communities concerned. The building possesses aesthetic qualities and is an important part of the townscape, having a prominent facade and being located opposite the town's main public park.	
