= Morty =

Morty or Mortie is a masculine given name which may refer to:

== People ==
- Morty Buckles (born 1971 or 1972), African-American former race car driver
- Mortimer Morty Corb (1917–1996), American jazz double-bassist
- Mortimer Mortie Dutra (1899–1988), American golfer
- Morty Gunty (1929–1984), American actor and comedian
- Morty Black, stage name of bassist Morten Skaget (born 1960)

== Fictional characters ==
- Morty Fieldmouse, nephew of Disney character Mickey Mouse
- Morty Flickman, on Desperate Housewives, portrayed by Bob Newhart
- Morty Fine, father of the main character on the sitcom TV series The Nanny (1993-1999)
- Morty Manta, the English anime name of Manta Oyamada, a Shaman King character
- the title character of the American comic strip Morty Meekle (1956-1966)
- Morty Seinfeld, father of Jerry Seinfeld in the series Seinfeld
- Morty Smith, one of the title characters on the American animated series Rick and Morty
  - Alternative versions of Morty Smith, from alternate realities, including Oni Press' Rick and Morty comic series
- Morty (Pokémon), from the Pokémon universe
- Morty, father of Jacob in the Canadian animated series Jacob Two-Two
- Morty, the Angel of Death in the 2006 film Click
- Morty Fyde, a character from Captain Underpants
- Morty Rogers, a character from Adventure Time

== See also ==
- Louise De Mortie (1833–1867), African-American lecturer and fundraiser on behalf of American Civil War orphans
- Marty
- Mortimer (disambiguation)
- Morten
- Mort (disambiguation)
