= Darlinghurst Courthouse =

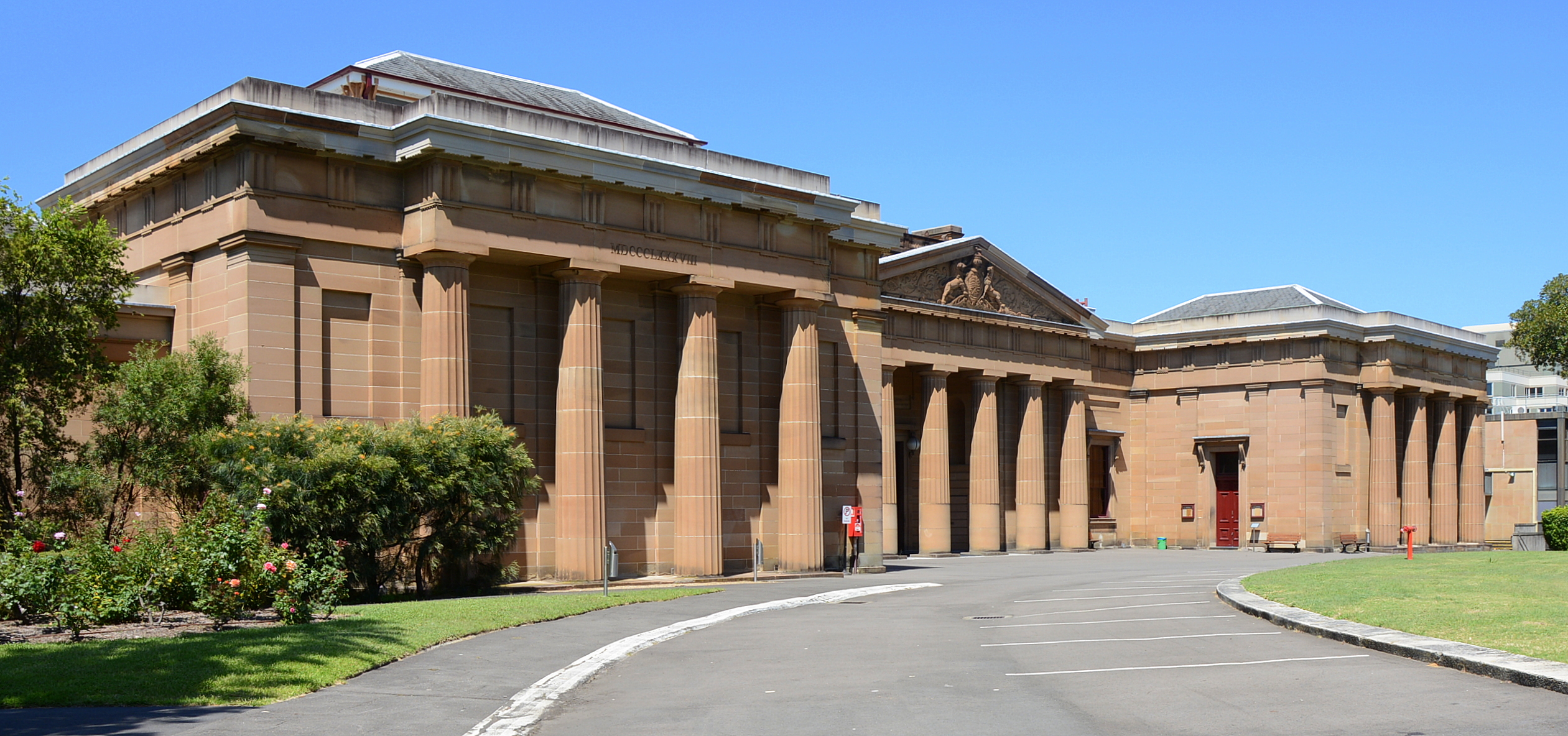
- The courthouse, in 2014

- Location within Sydney

General information
- Status: Completed
- Type: Courthouse
- Architectural style: Old Colonial Grecian
- Location: Taylor Square, Oxford Street, Darlinghurst, New South Wales, Australia
- Coordinates: 33°52′49″S 151°13′04″E
- Groundbreaking: 1826
- Construction started: 1835
- Completed: 1844; 1888
- Owner: Government of New South Wales
- Landlord: Department of Communities and Justice

Technical details
- Material: Sandstone; slate; internal timber joinery; marble

Design and construction
- Architects: Mortimer Lewis (1826–44); James Barnet (1884–88)
- Architecture firm: Colonial Architect of New South Wales

Website
- Darlinghurst Court House

New South Wales Heritage Register
- Official name: Darlinghurst Courthouse
- Type: Built
- Criteria: a., b., c., d., e., f., g.
- Designated: 2 April 1999
- Reference no.: 00792

The Darlinghurst Courthouse is a heritage-listed courthouse building located adjacent to Taylor Square on Oxford Street in the inner city Sydney suburb of Darlinghurst, New South Wales in Australia. Constructed in the Old Colonial Grecian style based on original designs by Colonial Architect, Mortimer Lewis, the building structure was completed in 1880 under the supervision of Lewis's successor, James Barnet. It was added to the New South Wales State Heritage Register on 2 April 1999.

The courthouse is predominately used for sittings of the Supreme Court of New South Wales.

== History ==
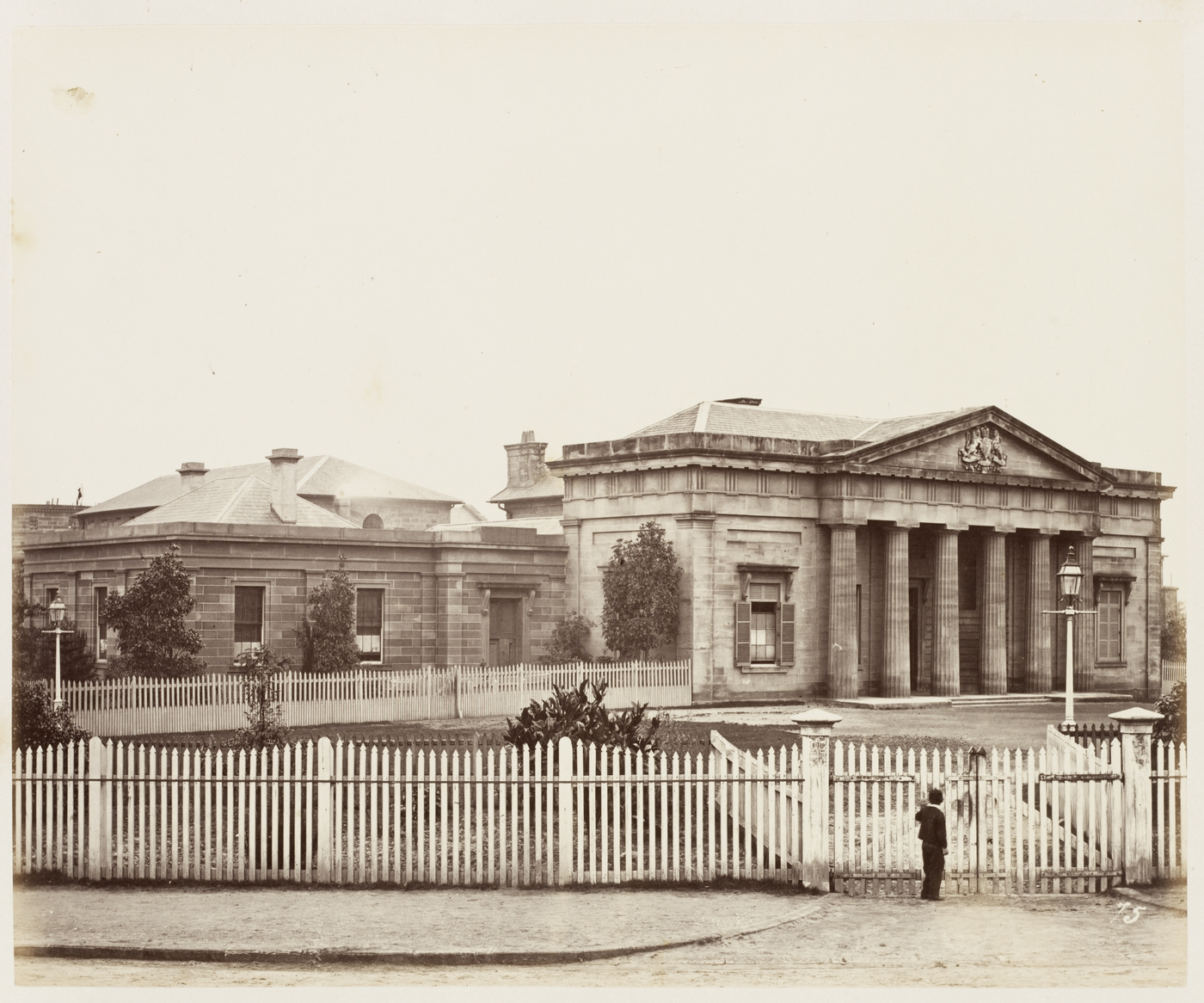
Darlinghurst Courthouse, 1872.

Darlinghurst Courthouse and residence was originally designed by the Colonial Architect Mortimer Lewis. Work commenced in 1835 but was not completed until 1844. The construction of a new courthouse and jail had been a priority of the incoming Governor of New South Wales, Richard Bourke, who was concerned by the need to march prisoners through the city from the jail on George Street to the courthouse on King Street.

The foundations for Darlinghurst Courthouse were laid by convict work gangs and construction began in 1836. Court proceedings were held in the building as early as 1842, despite the unfinished state of the building. Construction of a new jail in Darlinghurst began in the 1820s and was ready for occupation in the early 1840s. The courthouse was a milestone building in New South Wales, being specifically designed to suit its purpose and impart authority and the power of the law.

Darlinghurst Courthouse was subsequently altered and extended by successive Colonial and Government Architects. This began with Edmund Blacket, who supervised the repair to the roof in the 1850s which was in danger of collapse.

Colonial Architect James Barnet designed major flanking court room pavilion additions to the building in 1884-88. Major repairs were undertaken to the original wing of the courthouse in 1901. The entire roof was replaced and changes were made to the façade. The drawings for these alterations were signed by George McRae in the Government Architect's Office.

In 1903, Darlinghurst Courthouse was selected as one of the sites for the newly created High Court of Australia following Federation. In 1907, accommodation was provided for the expansion of the High Court. Alterations included the addition of a new single-storey wing to house five new rooms.

An increase in the number of High Court Justices led to the construction of a second storey on this new wing. Numerous alterations took place throughout the twentieth century to cope with increasing court proceedings and expansions of the High Court. In 1913-14 a second expansion took place to further accommodate the High Court and eventually a new high court was added to the complex in 1922.

Alterations, maintenance and expansions continued to take place throughout the twentieth century. A major extension on the eastern side of the courthouse was completed c. 1963. The extension was designed by the Government Architect's Office and includes two courtrooms and offices. The High Court was relocated to Canberra in 1980, following completion of a purpose-built building.

== Description ==
Darlinghurst Courthouse and Residence is a massive, heavily designed Old Colonial Grecian style public building. It communicates its civic presence through its form. The symmetrical building uses elements of the Greek temple form, having a fluted stone Doric columned portico supporting a pedimented gable entrance to the central court (Court 5), flanked by colonnaded wings which stand forward of the robust front elevations. The courthouse and residence are constructed in smooth dressed sandstone with a slate roof, timber floors and joinery and a marble tiled vestibule.

The interiors of the courthouse are highly intact, with original furniture and fittings intact in all courtrooms and most offices. The courthouse has been added to continuously throughout its 170-year history, but retains a strong, coherent form to the main frontage on Oxford Street. Additions have generally maintained the qualities of the original courthouse, with high quality materials and fixtures used throughout.

The courthouse is set back from the street in grounds with a curved driveway and scattered plantings. An iron palisade fence with a sandstone base bounds the courthouse grounds and heavy sandstone and iron entrance gates are located to the north and south. The rear boundary of the grounds is defined by the wall of Darlinghurst Gaol. The prison dock is located between the courthouse building and the jail wall.

The courthouse complex includes seven court rooms (supreme courts and district courts), jury rooms, judge and associate chambers, sheriff's office, court keeper's residence, court reporters office, cells, corrective services, witness rooms, and kitchens for jury meals.

== Heritage listing ==
The Darlinghurst Court House and residence is the finest, and only erudite Old Colonial Grecian public building complex surviving in Australia. Commenced in the 1830s, it has a long and continual association with the provision of law and order along with the neighbouring Darlinghurst Gaol complex. The building is prominently sited at Taylor Square.

The Court House, designed by colonial architect Mortimer Lewis and built between 1837 and 1844, is the first purpose designed court house to be built in NSW. The pavilions on either side were designed by James Barnet around 1886. The extension facing Victoria Street was designed by the Government Architect's Office and completed c.1963.

Darlinghurst Courthouse was listed on the New South Wales State Heritage Register on 2 April 1999.

== See also ==
- Australian non-residential architectural styles
- Bathurst Courthouse
- Darlinghurst Gaol
- Goulburn Court House
