= Mort (disambiguation) =

Mort is a Discworld novel by Terry Pratchett, also broadcast as a BBC radio play.

Mort may also refer to:

== Places ==
- Île des Morts, a French island
- Laguna del Mort, a lake in Italy
- Mont Mort, a mountain on the border between Switzerland and Italy
- Mort Bay, Papua New Guinea
- Mort's Dock, a former dry dock, slipway and shipyard in Australia

== People ==
- Mort (name), including a list of people (and fictional characters) with the given name or surname
- Chris Mortensen (born 1951), American sports journalist nicknamed "Mort"

== Science ==
- MORT (long non-coding RNA), human gene
- Mean oceanic residence time, used in chemical oceanography
- Tropical Storm Mort, in the 1997 Pacific typhoon season

== Other uses ==
- MoRT, an album by Blut Aus Nord
- Mort, feminine form of Mar, a title of respect in the Syriac language

== See also ==
- Micromort, a unit of risk of death
