= Liverpool Courthouse =

Former courthouse in New South Wales, Australia

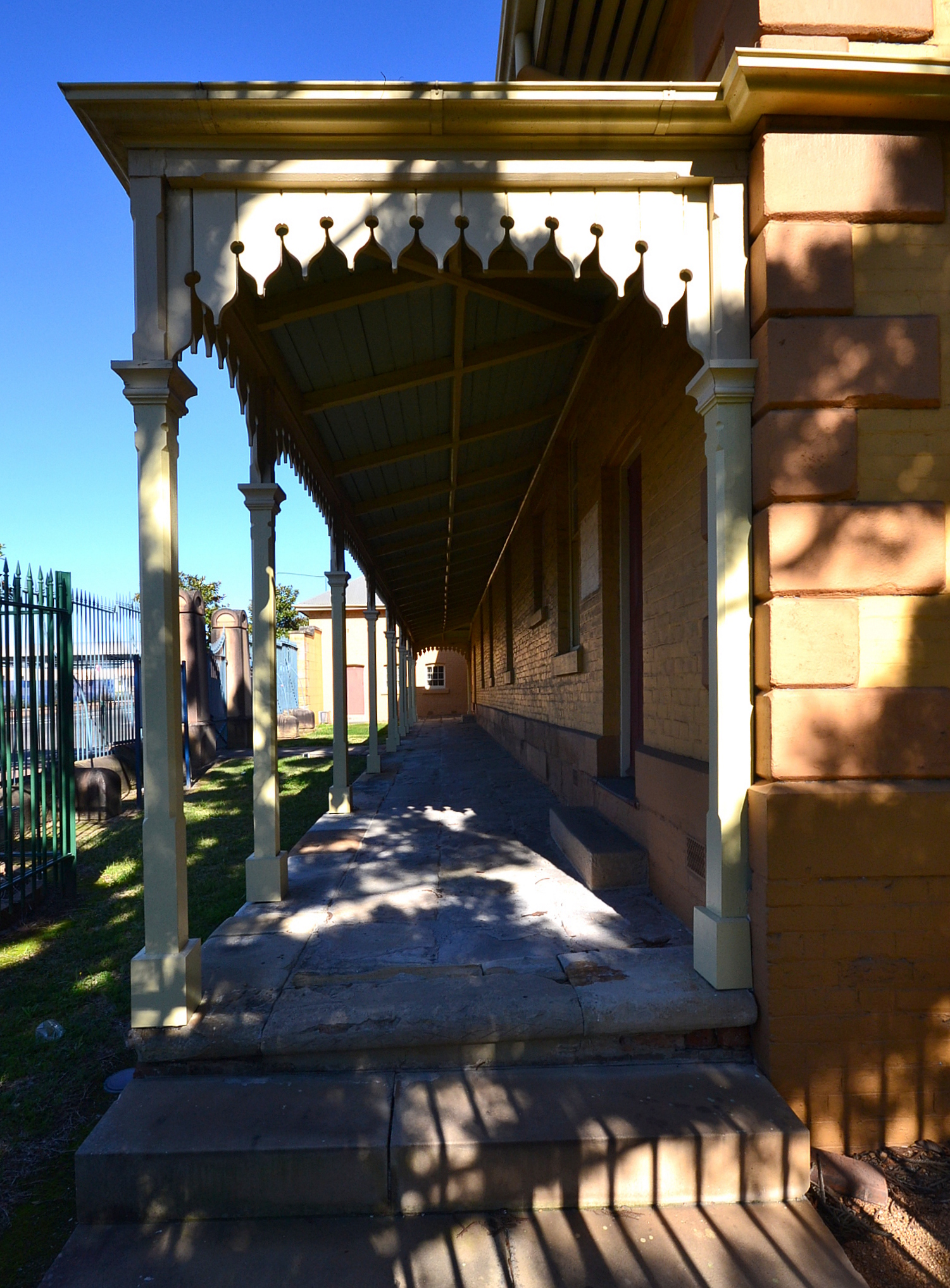
- Former court house, pictured in 2013

- Location of the former Liverpool Courthouse in greater Sydney Liverpool Courthouse (Australia)
- 33°55′28″S 150°55′32″E
- Location: 251 Bigge Street, Liverpool, City of Liverpool, New South Wales, Australia

History
- Built: 1820

Site notes
- Architectural style: Colonial Georgian

New South Wales Heritage Register
- Official name: Liverpool Courthouse (former) and Potential Archaeological Site
- Type: State heritage (built)
- Designated: 3 November 2017
- Reference no.: 1999
- Type: Courthouse
- Category: Law Enforcement

Liverpool Courthouse is a heritage-listed former courthouse at 251 Bigge Street, Liverpool, City of Liverpool, New South Wales, Australia. It was built during 1820. It is also known as Liverpool Courthouse (former) and Potential Archaeological Site. It was added to the New South Wales State Heritage Register on 3 November 2017.

== History ==
The former Liverpool Courthouse building was adapted, over time, from the old Liverpool gaol house built c:1820. The gaol house was one of many convict era buildings that Governor Lachlan Macquarie had built in Liverpool before his departure in 1822. A convict and soldier barracks were also built next to the gaol house. The area has the potential to contain a range of archaeological remains associated with the earliest use of the site. These remains are considered to be of state heritage significance and may provide information about early colonial and convict life in Liverpool.

Surveyor Robert Hoddle's 1827 map of Liverpool clearly shows the complex of buildings on the site. In 1836 James Backhouse visited the Liverpool gaol and described it as:

A brick building of two large rooms for prisoners of common order, one for debtors, another for females, which is small: also three good cells, but all opening into one common yard, along with the dwellings of the turnkey and overseer, and the cooking-place, and other offices.

An 1840 plan also show these buildings.

Later alterations and additions occurred, most significantly a police station to the rear of the courthouse and likely outside, or adjacent to the wall of the barracks visible in Hoddle's 1827 map and the 1840 plan. This police station remained until after the mid-20th century.

Overview of Archaeological Potential: there is a high potential for archaeological remains associated with the barracks buildings shown on the 1827 and 1840 plans.

The land around the Georges River and Liverpool was occupied by the Darug Aboriginal people prior to the arrival of British settlers in 1788. The Liverpool district was home to what the early Europeans mistakenly called the Liverpool Tribe, who were in fact the Cabrogal clan of the Darug Tribe.

Governor Macquarie selected a site for a town at Liverpool on 7 November 1810. After establishing a site in the centre of the proposed town for a church, he left the details of laying out the town in the hands of surveyor James Meehan. After the departure of Governor Macquarie in 1821, Governor Brisbane began the relocation of convict labour from public works to assignment on private properties, on the recommendations of the Bigge Report. The official end of transportation in 1840 led to the winding down of the convict system and an economic decline for Liverpool.

The development of Liverpool in the second half of the 19th century was driven by the establishment of the railway in 1856, although substantial expansion did not occur until the end of the 1880s when there was a growth in workers housing and subdivision of previously vacant land.

== Description ==
A single-storey Colonial Georgian style government building with hipped roof, with L-shaped plan, probably incorporating main block of convict gaol built early 1820s. Sandstock brick construction on sandstone foundations with articulated sandstone quoins, decorative timber verandah with valance and iron roofs. Twelve pane double hung windows and four panel doors doors. Original structure appears altered and extended about 1855 using part of gaol wall on south east portion of site. Two bays remain of impressive iron palisade with stone gate piers.

== Heritage listing ==
As at 5 May 2017, the former Liverpool Courthouse (1819) and Potential Archaeological Site is of state heritage significance as it demonstrates the activities of significant historic importance to the State from 1819 for over 120 years. The archaeology site is one of the earliest surviving examples of a convict barracks on the Australian mainland. It is likely that only Sydney's Hyde Park Barracks, (1817–19) predates it. The potential archaeological remains of the barracks at the rear of the courthouse may provide key ongoing research opportunities in fields such as convict studies, colonial settlement and working class communities, all important themes in Australian history.

The former Liverpool Courthouse and potential archaeology provides evidence of the important role of Liverpool in the early colonial period as a key government administrative centre during Macquarie's time in office. The extant building served important functions in the colonial period, first as a gaol and then as a courthouse and demonstrates the history of judicial service in the colony of New South Wales for over 120 years. The Courthouse is a rare example of an early colonial Georgian courthouse with later Victorian additions and embellishments, indicating a level of achievement in its design and construction. Because of its early construction and use as a convict barracks before it became a courthouse, the building demonstrates variation in form and style in NSW, highlighting its rarity and importance.

Liverpool Courthouse was listed on the New South Wales State Heritage Register on 3 November 2017 having satisfied the following criteria.

The place is important in demonstrating the course, or pattern, of cultural or natural history in New South Wales.

The site meets this criterion at a state level as the Liverpool Courthouse (former) demonstrates the accommodation of convicts at a time when those convicts were actively engaged in the physical construction of the town of Liverpool in its very early days. The Courthouse is one of the oldest buildings in Liverpool and, dating from the Macquarie era, is probably the second oldest existing convict barracks in mainland Australia. A relatively small number of buildings in the state date from this period or earlier.

In its role as a courthouse, it provided an important contribution to the administering of law and order and the furthering of social justice over a period spanning 120 years.

The place is important in demonstrating aesthetic characteristics and/or a high degree of creative or technical achievement in New South Wales.

The site meets this criterion at a state level. The Liverpool Courthouse is an example of an early Colonial Georgian convict barrack with later Victorian additions and embellishments associated with its use as a courthouse which indicate a level of technical achievement in its design and construction. The site is situated opposite the colonial period Bigge Park and its location in the vicinity to a number of other historic sites in the Liverpool city centre based on the Hoddle grid street plan adds landmark qualities to the site.

The place has potential to yield information that will contribute to an understanding of the cultural or natural history of New South Wales.

The site contains areas of archaeological significance at a state level as these can provide evidence of material culture which yields information that may be unavailable from documentary sources alone. Analysis of the archaeological information that could potentially be gathered at this site includes data that would provide a window into the changing impact of Government during the formative historical period.

The site has the potential to contain structural remains associated with the early gaol and barracks buildings, such as footings, postholes, fences and outbuildings. This information may be crucial to interpreting the site's development over time.

The physical remains at the site and the associated artefact collection would provide major ongoing research opportunities in fields such as convictism, colonial settlement and working class communities, which are major themes in Australian history.

The place possesses uncommon, rare or endangered aspects of the cultural or natural history of New South Wales.

The former Liverpool Courthouse is one of the oldest and last remaining convict barracks in the State, almost all others of its time having been destroyed or demolished. The Former Liverpool Courthouse buildings provide a fine example of early 19th century architecture erected during the significant period of Governor Macquarie's governorship. Further, the Former Liverpool Courthouse is a remnant of Liverpool's important colonial past. It is part of a group of Colonial buildings which includes St Luke's Church and the former Hospital, which illustrate different aspects of Liverpool's convict beginnings. The potential archaeology of this period is a rare resource.

Despite having been originally designed and used as a convict barracks, the Former Liverpool Courthouse served predominantly as a courthouse. As such the building is possibly unique in being the only courthouse in NSW not to have been originally designed by the Government Architect.

The place is important in demonstrating the principal characteristics of a class of cultural or natural places/environments in New South Wales.

The Liverpool Courthouse (former) is representative of the layout, character and architectural style of an early 19th century gaol, which was then modified to a form that is representative of the layout, character and architectural style of a 19th-century courthouse.

== See also ==
- Courthouses in New South Wales
