= Mortimer (given name) =

Mortimer is a masculine given name which may refer to:

== People ==
- Mortimer J. Adler (1902–2001), American philosopher, educator and author
- Mortimer Caplin (1916–2019), American lawyer and educator
- Mortimer Cleveland (1883–?), American architect
- Mortimer Collins (1827–1876), English poet and novelist
- Mortimer Davis (1866–1928), Canadian businessman and philanthropist
- Mortimer Durand (1850–1924), British diplomat and civil servant in British India
- Mortimer Fitzland Elliott (1839–1920), American politician
- Mortimer Hogan (1862–1923), American Major League Baseball outfielder
- Mortimer von Kessel (1893–1981), German World War II general
- Mort Leav (1916–2005), American comic book and advertising artist
- Mortimer Dormer Leggett (1821–1896), American lawyer, school administrator, professor and Union Army major general during the American Civil War
- Mortimer Lewis (1796–1879), English architect and surveyor; Colonial Architect in New South Wales
- Mortimer Menpes (1855–1938), Australian-born artist, author, printmaker and illustrator
- Mortimer M. Miller (1929–2017), American politician and writer
- Mortimer Mishkin (1926–2021), American neuropsychologist
- Mortimer L. Neinken (1896–1984), American stamp collector
- Mortimer Planno (1929–2006), drummer and Rastafari elder best known as the Rasta teacher of Bob Marley
- Mortimer R. Proctor (1889–1968), American politician, 66th governor of Vermont
- Mortimer Sackler (1916–2010), American physician, entrepreneur and philanthropist
- Mortimer L. Schiff (1877–1931), American banker and Boy Scouts of America leader
- Mortimer Singer (1863–1929), Anglo-American landowner, philanthropist, sportsman and early pilot
- Mortimer Thomson (1832–1875), American journalist and humorist
- Mortimer Tollemache (1872–1950), English cricketer
- Mortimer von Maltzan (1793–1843), Prussian diplomat and Foreign Minister
- Mortimer Wade (1821–1902), American manufacturer and politician
- Mort Weisinger (1915–1978), American magazine and comic book editor
- Mortimer Wheeler (1890–1976), British archaeologist
- Mortimer Wilson (1876–1932), American composer of classical music
- Mortimer Zuckerman (born 1937), Canadian-born American businessman

== Fictional characters ==
- Mortimer, a name sometimes given to the Grim Reaper (see Personifications of death), with its origin in the Latin word morti (to die)
- Mortimer Brewster, protagonist of the play Arsenic and Old Lace and its film adaptation
- Mortimer Delvile, one of the protagonists in Cecilia (Burnley novel)
- Mortimer Duke, in the movie Trading Places, played by Don Ameche
- Mortimer Folchart, in Cornelia Funke's Inkheart series of fantasy books
- Mortimer Goth, a pre-made sim in The Sims series
- Mortimer McMire, the primary antagonist of the Commander Keen series
- Mortimer Mouse, a Disney character and rival of Mickey Mouse
- Morty Smith, one of the title characters on the American animated series Rick and Morty
- Mortimer Snerd, a ventriloquist's dummy employed by Edgar Bergen
- Mortimer Toynbee, or Toad (Marvel Comics), a mutant in the X-Men comics
- Mortimer "Mort", the protagonist of Terry Pratchett's novel Mort and its stage play adaptation
- Mortimer, a Robert Munsch character and story
- Mortimer, a criminal in the Italian comic book Zagor
- Uncle Mortimer, a theme park mastermind from the video games Thrillville and Thrillville: Off the Rails
- Mortimer, an undead master of the Slayer skill in Old School RuneScape

== See also ==
- Mort (name)
- Mortimer the surname
