= Mortimer (disambiguation) =

Mortimer is an English surname.

Mortimer may also refer to:

== People and fictional characters ==
- Mortimer (given name), a list of people and fictional characters

== Places ==
- Mortimer, New Brunswick, Canada, an unincorporated community
- Mortimer Common, Berkshire, England, a village generally referred to as Mortimer
- Mortimer Trail, a long-distance footpath and recreational walk in Shropshire and Herefordshire, England
- Mortimer, North Carolina, United States, a ghost town
- Mortimer, Ohio, United States, an unincorporated community

== Other uses ==
- Baron Mortimer, a title in the Peerage of England
- Baron Mortimer of Wigmore, two titles in the Peerage of England
- Mortimer Community College, a coeducational secondary school in South Shields, Tyne and Wear, England

== See also ==
- Earl of Oxford and Earl Mortimer, a title in the Peerage of Great Britain
- Mortimer West End, Hampshire, England, a village and civil parish
- Cleobury Mortimer, Shropshire, England, a small town and civil parish
- Stratfield Mortimer, Berkshire, England, a village
- Mortimer's disease, a skin disease
- Ruy Lopez, Mortimer Trap, a chess opening trap
