= MORT (long non-coding RNA) =

Non-coding RNA in the species Homo sapiens

ZNF667-AS1

Identifiers
- Aliases: ZNF667-AS1, MORT, ZNF667 antisense RNA 1 (head to head)
- External IDs: GeneCards: ZNF667-AS1

Gene location (Human)
Chr.	Chromosome 19 (human)
Band	19q13.43	Start	56,477,250 bp
Band	19q13.43	End	56,504,362 bp
RNA expression pattern
Bgee	Human / Mouse (ortholog); Top expressed in: sperm; nucleus accumbens; Brodmann area 23; middle temporal gyrus; primary visual cortex; caudate nucleus; putamen; cingulate gyrus; hypothalamus; anterior cingulate cortex / n/a; More reference expression data
BioGPS	n/a
Orthologs
Databases	NCBI: entry; OMA: entry
Species	Human	Mouse
Entrez	100128252	n/a
Ensembl	ENSG00000166770	n/a
UniProt	n a	n/a
RefSeq (mRNA)	NM_198879	n/a
RefSeq (protein)	n/a	n/a
Location (UCSC)	Chr 19: 56.48 – 56.5 Mb	n/a
PubMed search		n/a
- Wikidata
View/Edit Human

MORT (Mortal Obligate RNA Transcript (also known as ZNF667-AS1)) is a long non-coding RNA (lncRNA) of the intergenic type (lincRNA) that is specific to humans and great apes. The MORT transcript is produced in all mortal cell types, but is lost in a large fraction of the most common human cancers and therefore might have a tumor suppressive function.

== Genomic location ==
The MORT gene is located on human chromosome 19, at position 56,989,000–57,007,000 (hg19) within a cluster of zinc finger genes (ZNF genes). The MORT gene consists of 2 exons, 260 and 1270 bp, respectively, that are separated by a 16 kbp intron. A large portion of the second MORT exon is formed by repetitive elements – two LINEs and an LTR element. The MORT promoter is located in a CpG island that is shared with the ZNF667 gene; the two genes reside in a head to head orientation with one another. Despite the MORT gene's location inside a cluster of ZNF genes, the MORT gene is not homologous to any ZNF genes. While the MORT gene is in a head to head orientation with ZNF667, MORT does not overlap the ZNF667 gene, nor does it share any antisense homology to ZNF667, so the officially used symbol ZNF667-AS1 is somewhat misleading.

== Evolution ==
MORT has orthologs only in great apes – chimpanzees, gorillas and orangutans, and the RNA expression data indicates that the MORT transcript is expressed in these species. Thus, from a phylogenetic point view, MORT is likely a young lincRNA gene that emerged during evolution of great apes. It is possible that the long life span of the great apes required evolution of additional genes with tumor suppressive activity, and that MORT is such an example.

== Silencing in cancer ==
MORT is expressed in all 16 normal human tissues reported in the Illumina body map data, as well as all in vitro cultured, finite lifespan, human cell strains that have been analyzed. In contrast, MORT gene expression is lost in a large percentage of human cancers and human cancer cell lines. Using data from human cancers curated in TCGA, MORT RNA expression and DNA methylation state were evaluated in the 10 most common male cancers and the 10 most common female cancers (totalling 17 different cancer types based on TCGA classification). Analysis shows that the MORT gene expression is silenced by DNA hypermethylation of its CpG island promoter in a majority of human tumor samples in 15 of these 17 human cancers.

The 15 tumor types where MORT is frequently silenced are acute myeloid leukemia, bladder urothelial carcinoma, breast invasive carcinoma, colon adenocarcinoma, head and neck squamous-cell carcinoma, kidney renal clear cell carcinoma, kidney renal papillary cell carcinoma, liver hepatocellular carcinoma, lung adenocarcinoma, lung squamous cell carcinoma, lymphoid neoplasm diffuse large B-cell lymphoma, pancreatic adenocarcinoma, rectum adenocarcinoma, skin cutaneous melanoma, and Uterine Corpus Endometrial Carcinoma. MORT is silenced in cervical cancer and therefore may serve as an independent prognostic factor with low MORT expression be associated with a decreased overall survival.

Since cell immortality is an obligate feature of the cancer cell and MORT was discovered as a target of epigenetic silencing at the boundary where finite lifespan human cells transition from mortal to immortal, MORT’s epigenetic inactivation may create a cellular state permissive to cell immortalization and suggests a possible tumor suppressive mechanism of MORT’s action. If this prediction is true, then epigenetic silencing of MORT should be an early identifiable lesion during human carcinogenesis and predicted to occur in premalignant lesions where cells have acquired pathologic immortality on their route to malignant transformation. Indeed, recent work has shown that MORT is epigenetically silenced in both DCIS, a premalignant lesion of invasive breast cancer, and colonic adenomas, a premalignant lesion of colon adenocarcinoma. Furthermore epigenetic silencing of MORT is associated with luminal, hormone receptor positive breast cancer, overexpression of the oncogene CCND1, and GATA3 mutations, but is negatively correlated with p53 mutations. In summary, aberrant DNA hypermethylation-mediated epigenetic silencing of MORT occurs early during human carcinogenesis apparently coincident with when a mortal cell pathologically transitions to an immortal cell.

== Cellular Function ==
The precise molecular function of MORT remains enigmatic; however, it is known that MORT is found preferentially in the cell cytoplasm with differential density centrifugation showing that MORT is enriched in the 100,000 g fraction, which contains polysomes, microsomes, endoplasmic reticulum, and the plasma membrane. Evidence is mounting that MORT acts as a regulator of protein translation through interactions with RNA binding proteins.
