= Goulburn Court House =

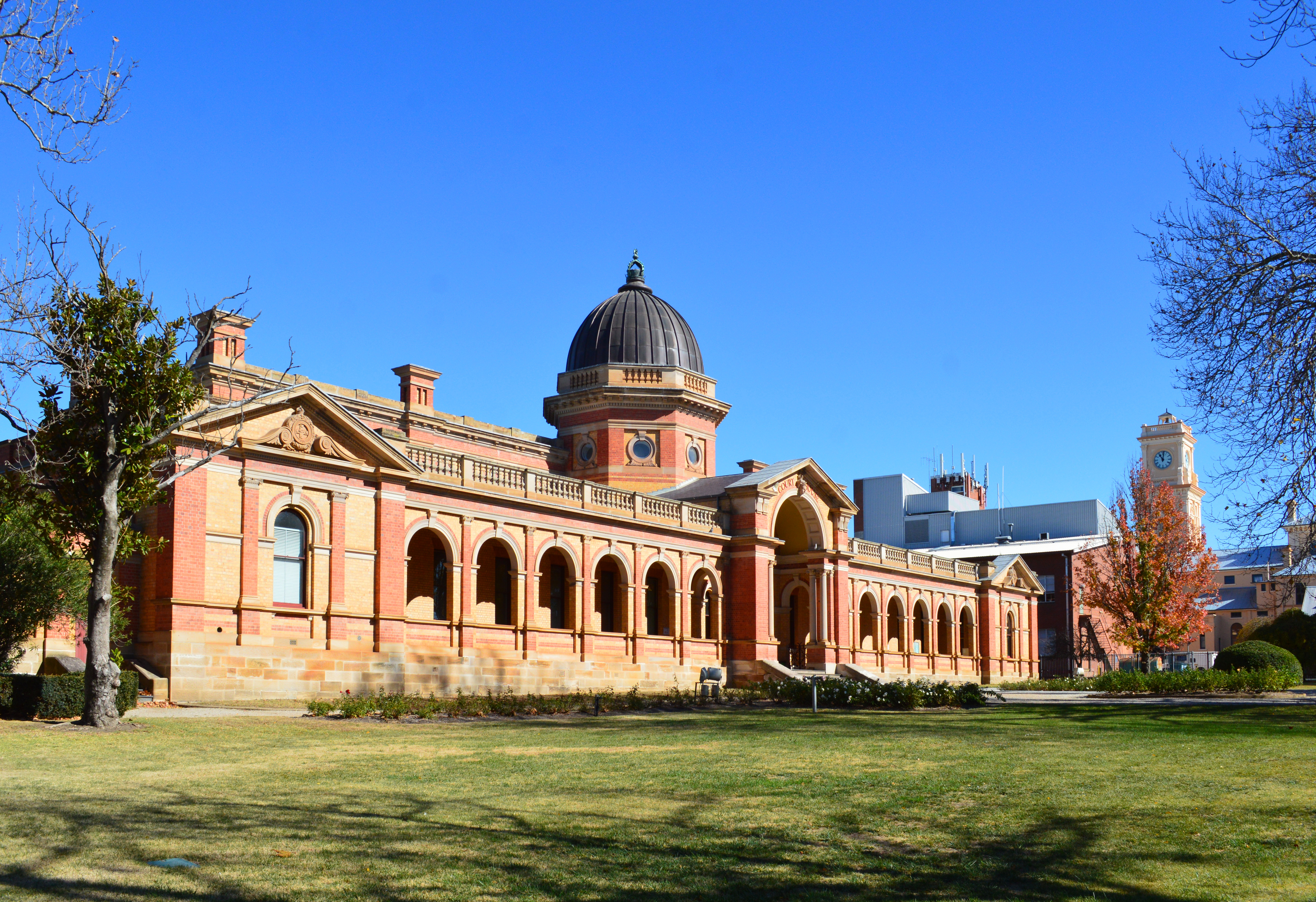

- Location within New South Wales

General information
- Status: Completed
- Type: Court house
- Architectural style: Victorian Free Classical
- Location: Goulburn, New South Wales, Australia
- Coordinates: 34°45′21″S 149°43′09″E
- Construction started: 1885
- Completed: 1887
- Opened: 14 October 1887 by Sir Frederick Darley, Chief Justice of NSW
- Cost: A£24,593
- Owner: Government of New South Wales
- Landlord: Department of Communities and Justice

Technical details
- Material: Sandstone; internal timber joinery; copper sheeting in roof and dome

Design and construction
- Architects: James Barnet with Edward Rumsey
- Architecture firm: Colonial Architect of New South Wales
- Main contractor: David Jones

Website
- Goulburn Court House

New South Wales Heritage Register
- Official name: Goulburn Court House and Residence
- Type: Built
- Criteria: a., c., d., e., f., g.
- Designated: 2 April 1999
- Reference no.: 00793

Goulburn Court House is a heritage-listed courthouse at 4 Montague Street, Goulburn, in the Southern Tablelands region of New South Wales, Australia. It was designed in the Federation Free Classical style based on original designs by Colonial Architect, James Barnet and his assistant Edward Rumsey. It was built from 1885 to 1887 by David Jones. The property is owned by the New South Wales Department of Justice. It was added to the New South Wales State Heritage Register on 2 April 1999.

== History ==
Goulburn has had four courthouses. The first was built around 1830 and was a rough hewn timber building. A drawing for a second courthouse designed by the architect William Buchanan is dated 1834. It is not clear whether this building was intended for the first or second township nor whether it was built. The colonial architect Mortimer Lewis designed the third courthouse in 1835 but it was not built until 1847 after the first permanent gaol and lock up were built on the site

Nothing is known of the grounds prior to the building of the present courthouse. This, the fourth courthouse, was designed by the colonial architect James Barnet. The building of it was delayed by the completion of Goulburn's new gaol on the northern outskirts of the town. A second permanent lock up, designed by Barnet, was also completed prior to the building of the fourth courthouse. It was linked to the Lewis courthouse after the new courthouse was completed in 1887, and the third courthouse subsequently became the Lands Office in 1888.

The builder of the courthouse was David Jones, a contractor from Bathurst (who had just completed Bathurst Courthouse). The building took 30 months to complete and cost 24, 593 pounds to construct. It provided separate rooms for the Circuit Court (District Court and Quarter Sessions) and Magistrates Court (Petty Sessions), functions dating back respectively to 1847 and 1832.

The stone dwarf wall and iron picket fence was not constructed until 1900 with the Goulburn Herald reporting that tenders were invited until 16 October 1899. The planting of the grounds were also carried out at this time.

== Description ==
The Goulburn Court House and Residence is an impressive and monumental building designed by Colonial Architect James Barnet in the Victorian Free Classical style. It is symmetrically planned about a central copper dome set on an octagonal base flanked on either side by wing buildings with arched colonnades on the ground floor and setback arched window openings on the first floor (Schwager Brooks and Partners). The main entrance has an arched porch with pedimented roof flanked either side by long arched colonnades with baulstered parapets. These colonnades are terminated by pediments bearing the New South Wales Coat of Arms. Construction is of distinct rust-red colour polychrome brick with decorative sandstone facing relief work. The two court rooms are each approximately 15m x 9m wide with public galleries reached by stone stairways on either side of the curved pendentives supporting the dome. The building's walls, floors and ceilings are richly decorated using plaster and cedar joinery, all of which is in very good condition.

The main elevation is approached via a formal garden of mature, exotic trees, lawns and shrubs being enclosed by a tall iron picket fence. This fence contains a fine set of gates and stone gate piers.

The building maintains its historical and aesthetic integrity with surviving early plantings and hard elements and largely sympathetic recent changes and plantings.

=== Modifications and dates ===
- 1830–32: First court house built at Goulburn Plains, exact site unknown.
- 1833: Site for permanent gaol and court house reserved at crossing of main streets.
- 1834: Second court house designed and possibly built.
- 1835: Third court house designed by Mortimer Lewis.
- 1847–48: Third court house built by James Sinclair
- 1857: Alterations to Third court house – gallery, two porches and kitchen added
- 1866: Jury room added to court house
- 1872: unspecified alterations to the court house
- 1884–87: Fourth court house built, architect Barnet/Rumsey, builder David Jones
- 1888: Third courthouse became Crown Lands Office
- 1898: Drawings prepared for court house fence
- 1971: Government architect minor alterations to court house
- 1982–85: Petty Sessions became Local Court
- 1991: Government Architect minor alterations
- 1993: Proposed linking of court house gardens to Belmore Park via chicanes.

== Heritage listing ==
The Goulburn Court house is significant as it is part of an intact Victorian civic precinct in a NSW regional centre together with Bathurst Court house, Goulburn reflects the development of the state in the late 19th century. Comparable developments include being at the end of an important rail line and the change in character of the towns from penal settlements to regional government administrative centres. The Goulburn courthouse and its setting is an expression of a cultural and developmental phase, embodying the confidence of the late Victorian era and is associated with the coming of age of the town, the lobbying for civic improvement and demonstrates an important phase in the town's evolution and development.

The design is associated with and is a climactic work of the architect Barnet and his team at the Government Architects Office. The extravagance of the grand courthouses at Goulburn and Bathurst was never to be repeated after the 1890s depression and restructure of the Government Architects Office. It is both a representative and a rare example of an important Victorian courthouse with related garden. Other courthouses either never had substantial gardens or such gardens do not retain their Victorian character.

The building is an accomplished example of Victorian Free Classical design demonstrating Palladian concepts and Mannerist influences. The architectural design shows academic excellence. The building demonstrates exceptional standards of construction in both materials and workmanship. The building contains the highest quality stone carving, bricklaying, metal and timberwork. The exceptional quality extends even to details such as ventilation and door furniture and to the fine structure which forms the dome. The Goulburn Courthouse garden enhances and is enhanced by the courthouse buildings and Belmore Park opposite. The courthouse garden is related to but, importantly, distinct from Belmore Park. Its formal character is emphasised by its separation from the street by fences and gates.

The place has been in continual use for its original purpose for the last 100 years and for the foreseeable future.

Goulburn Court House was listed on the New South Wales State Heritage Register on 2 April 1999 having satisfied the following criteria.

The place is important in demonstrating the course, or pattern, of cultural or natural history in New South Wales.

The Goulburn Court House is part of an intact Victorian civic precinct in a NSW regional centre. With Bathurst Court House, Goulburn reflects the development of the state in the late 19th century of the towns from penal centres to regional government administrative centres.

The building and its setting is an expression of a cultural and developmental phase, of the confidence of the late Victorian era and is associated with the coming age of the town, with lobbying for civic improvement and demonstrates an important phase in the town's evolution and development.

The design and style symbolises the authority of the estate and the prosperity of the community. The design is associated with and is a climactic work of the architect barnet and his team at the Government Architects Office. The extravagance of the grant courthouses at Goulburn and Bathurst was never to be repeated after the 1890s depression and restructure of the Government Architects Office.

The place has been in continual use for its original purpose for the last 100 years and for the foreseeable future.

The place is important in demonstrating aesthetic characteristics and/or a high degree of creative or technical achievement in New South Wales.

The Goulburn Court House building is considered to be of an exceptionally high standard of design and construction.

The building is an accomplished example of Victorian Free Classical design demonstrating Palladian concepts and Mannerist influences. The architectural design shows academic excellence.

The place is highly developed example of the tradition of court house design with the expression of the volumes of the courts on the exterior, and the hierarchy of spaces and detailing. The emphasis on public spaces given by the domes is a development of tradition at both Bathurst and Goulburn.

The building was built by David Jones and contains high quality stone carving, brick laying, metal and timberwork. This includes details such as the ventilation, the door furniture and the structure which forms the dome.

The Goulburn Court House garden enhances and is enhanced by the Court House buildings and Belmore Park opposite. The Court House garden is related to but, importantly, distinct from Belmore Park. Its fences and gates separate it from the street emphasising its formal character.

The place is important in the Goulburn civic precinct and to the overall town plan, forming with Belmore Park and Montague Street, the Major civic space in the town and is a landmark element (dome).

The surviving plantings and hard elements which comprise the garden maintain considerable unity in design and character to form a restrained formal garden which demonstrates Victorian approaches to civic gardens and planning. The planning of the garden is comparable in its formal classical design with that of the building and the garden design is closely related to the building design.

The place has strong or special association with a particular community or cultural group in New South Wales for social, cultural or spiritual reasons.

The courthouse and gardens are cared about and valued by the community, demonstrated by their current use for weddings and functions and former and continued use for community activities. The place is a symbol of unity and a setting for important events in the community.

The place has potential to yield information that will contribute to an understanding of the cultural or natural history of New South Wales.

The archaeological deposits under the floor have the potential to reveal further information about the process of building the place and previous buildings on the site.

The place possesses uncommon, rare or endangered aspects of the cultural or natural history of New South Wales.

It is a rare example of an important Victorian Court House with related garden.

The place is important in demonstrating the principal characteristics of a class of cultural or natural places/environments in New South Wales.

It is a representative example of an important Victorian Court House with related garden. Other court houses either never had substantial gardens or such gardens do not retain their Victorian character.
