= Mort (name) =

Mort is both a given name and surname.

Mort is a surname or family name in the United Kingdom, traditionally found in North West England, especially Lancashire. It is also found in the counties of Glamorganshire, Monmouthshire in South Wales, but is also found in many areas of the United Kingdom. The surname is also found in other countries from English/Scottish emigrants particularly the United States, Canada, Australia and New Zealand. Mort is also a variant of the surname Morton.

Mort is a common masculine given name or nickname/hypocorism variant of Morton or Mortimer, particularly in the United States.

Mort may refer to:

== Surname ==
Mort
Origin
- Region of origin: United Kingdom

Other names
- Variant form: Morton

- Chris Mort, English lawyer and former chairman of Newcastle United Football Club
- David Mort (1888–1963), British politician
- Graham Mort, British writer, editor and tutor
- Greg Mort (born 1952), American painter
- Helen Mort (born 1985), British poet
- Henry Mort (1818–1900), pastoralist, businessman and politician in what is now Australia
- Ian Mort (1937–1996), Australian rules footballer
- John Mort (1915–1997), Anglican bishop
- Ray Mort (1926–1994), English actor
- Thomas Mort (1897–1967), English footballer
- Thomas Sutcliffe Mort (1816–1878), Australian industrialist
- Valzhyna Mort (born Valhyna Martynava in 1981), Belarusian poet

== Given name or nickname ==
- Mort Abrahams (1916–2009), American film and television producer
- Mort Castle (born 1946), American horror author and writing teacher
- Morton Mort Cooper (1913–1958), American Major League Baseball pitcher
- Mort Crim (born 1935), American author and former broadcast journalist
- Mort Dixon (1892–1956), American lyricist
- Mort Drucker 1929–2020), American caricaturist and comics artist best known for his work in Mad magazine
- Morton Mort Garson (1924–2008), Canadian-born composer, arranger, songwriter and pioneer of electronic music
- Mort Gerberg (born 1931), American cartoonist and author
- Morton Horwitz (born 1938), American legal historian and Harvard law professor nicknamed "Mort the Tort"
- Morton Mort Kaer (1902–1992), American football player and pentathlete
- Mort Kondracke (born 1939), American political commentator and journalist
- Mort Künstler (1927–2025), American painter
- Mort Landsberg (1919–1970), American NFL player
- Mortimer Mort Leav (1916–2005), American comic book and advertising artist
- Mort Lindsey (1923–2012), American orchestrator, composer, pianist, conductor and musical director
- Morton Mort Meskin (1916–1995), American comic book artist
- Mort Mills (1919–1993), American actor born Mortimer Morris Kaplan
- Mort Nathan, American television producer, screenwriter and film director best known for his work on The Golden Girls
- Mort O'Shea (1882–1970), Irish Gaelic footballer
- Mort Rosenblum (born 1944), American author, editor and journalist
- Morton Mort Sahl (1927–2021), Canadian-born American comedian and social satirist
- Morton Mort Schell (born 1943), Australian former politician
- Mort Shuman (1938–1991), American singer, pianist and songwriter
- Mort Todd (born 1961), American writer and media entrepreneur, best known as an editor-in-chief of Cracked magazine
- Addison Morton Mort Walker (1923–2018), American comic strip artist (Beetle Bailey, Hi and Lois)
- Mortimer Mort Weisinger (1915–1978), American magazine and comic book editor

== Fictional characters ==
- Mort, in the animated films Madagascar, Madagascar: Escape 2 Africa and Madagascar 3: Europe's Most Wanted
- Mort Goldman, in the animated television show Family Guy
- Mort Metzger, the sheriff in the television series Murder, She Wrote
- The title character of the video game Mort the Chicken
- Morty Smith, of the animated television show Rick and Morty
- Death (DC Comics) - Also known as Madame Mort

== See also ==
- R. Mort Frayn (1906–1993), American politician
