= Bathurst Courthouse =

Courthouse in Australia

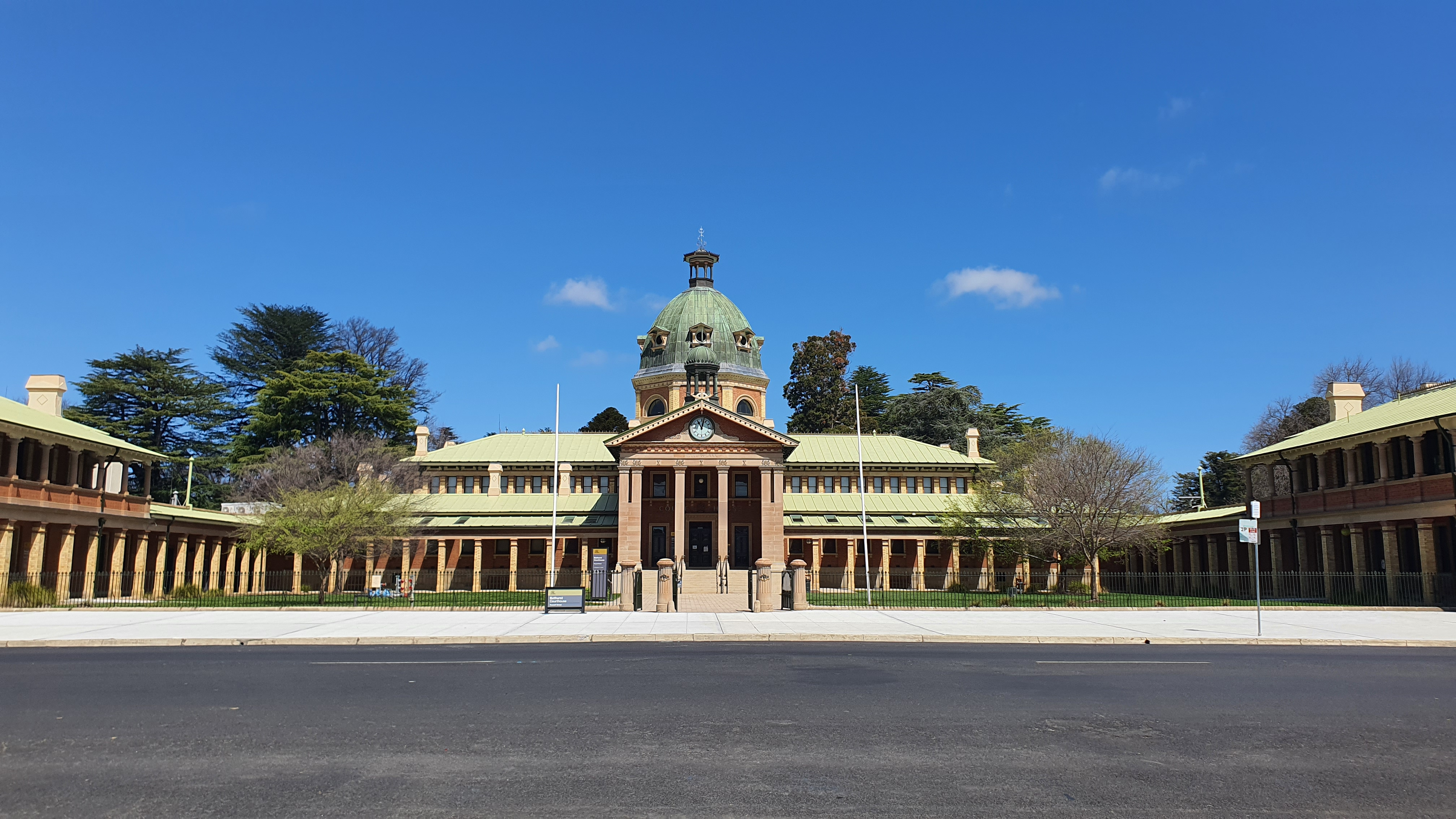

- Location within New South Wales

General information
- Status: Completed
- Type: Court house (and former post and telegraph offices)
- Architectural style: Federation Free Classical
- Location: Bathurst, New South Wales, Australia
- Coordinates: 33°25′06″S 149°34′42″E
- Construction started: 1877
- Completed: 1880
- Opened: 16 July 1880 by Francis Bathurst Suttor MP
- Cost: A£38,000
- Owner: Government of New South Wales
- Landlord: Department of Communities and Justice

Technical details
- Material: Sandstone; internal timber joinery; copper sheeting in roof and dome

Design and construction
- Architects: James Barnet (designer); Walter Liberty Vernon (supervised construction)
- Architecture firm: Colonial Architect of New South Wales

Website
- Bathurst Court House

New South Wales Heritage Register
- Official name: Bathurst Courthouse
- Type: Built
- Designated: 2 April 1999
- Reference no.: 00790

Bathurst Courthouse is a heritage-listed courthouse at Russell Street, Bathurst, in the Central West region of New South Wales, Australia. Constructed in the Federation Free Classical style based on original designs by Colonial Architect, James Barnet, the building structure was completed in 1880 under the supervision of Barnet's successor, Government Architect, Walter Liberty Vernon. The property is owned by Attorney General's Department (State Government). It was added to the New South Wales State Heritage Register on 2 April 1999.

== History ==
The current Bathurst Court House replaced three earlier Court House buildings, the last was demolished before 1880 to make way for the forecourt to the new Court House. Designed by the Colonial Architect James Barnet, the dominant central Court Block was built as part of an overall design which incorporated the former Post and Telegraph Office wings. In 1893 tenders were called by Government Architect Walter Liberty Vernon for the construction of the clock tower completed in 1900.

== Description ==
The Bathurst Court House is constructed of local brick with sandstone detailing. The roofs are clad in copper sheeting. It is a grand and impressive building which comprises a central building flanked on either side by wing buildings. The central building is surmounted by an octagonal domed tower with turrets and has a two-storey pediment portico entrance. All of the rooms have external outlets into brick walled courtyards and a clerestory semi circular apse galleries on two sides.

The architectural style is Victorian free classical. The exterior consists of brick, stone and copper.

== Heritage listing ==
The Bathurst Courthouse is one of the finest Victorian Court House buildings in New South Wales. Built as part of a precinct of Victorian public buildings, it is a landmark building prominently sited in the town centre of Bathurst. The building has a lengthy association with the provision of justice in the district.

Bathurst Courthouse was listed on the New South Wales State Heritage Register on 2 April 1999.

== See also ==
- Courthouses in New South Wales
