= Mortimer Lewis =

English-born architect, surveyor and public servant (1796–1879)

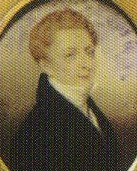
- Born: 1796; London
- Died: 9 March 1879 (aged 82–83); New South Wales
- Resting place: South Head Cemetery
- Occupation: Architect, surveyor

Mortimer William Lewis (1796 – 9 March 1879) was an English-born architect, surveyor and public servant who migrated to Australia and became Colonial Architect in the colony of New South Wales (now a state of Australia) from 1835 to 1849. Lewis was responsible for designing and overseeing many government buildings in Sydney and rural New South Wales, many of which are heritage listed.

== Early life ==
Lewis was born in Middlesex, England, in 1796, to Thomas Arundel Lewis and Caroline Lewis (née Derby) At the age of nineteen, he started work as a surveyor and draughtsman in the London office of the Inspector General of Fortifications. In 1819, he married Elizabeth Clements, who bore him three sons and a daughter. Another son was to be born later in Sydney, New South Wales. Lewis lived in the Eyre Estate at 11 South Bank, near St Johns Wood. After eight years in private practice, Lewis received an appointment as assistant surveyor in the office of surveyor-general of New South Wales. He set sail with his family in 1829 and arrived in Sydney in March, 1830.

== Career in Australia ==
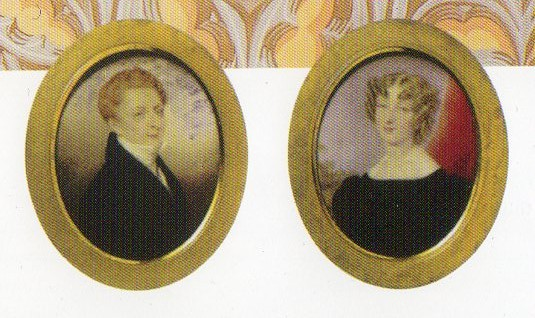
Mortimer Lewis and his wife Elizabeth

Lewis arrived in Sydney via Hobart on 1 April 1830 as a free settler aboard the convict ship the Dunvegan Castle, which left Britain on 28 September 1829.

From 1830 Lewis worked in the office of surveyor-general of New South Wales under Sir Thomas Mitchell, and during this time mapped the Great Dividing Range, 130 kilometres west of Sydney. Lewis was appointed to be the Town Surveyor; in 1835 he was further promoted to the position of Colonial Architect which he held for 14 years during a period of great expansion.

A long series of public works throughout New South Wales followed, including court houses, police stations and government buildings. Lewis also supervised the construction of buildings designed by other architects, a notable example being Government House designed in England by Edward Blore. Lewis became the leading proponent in Australia of the Classical Revival style, in particular the Doric variation, although he did not exclusively design in this style.

Lewis's post as Colonial Architect ended sourly after a public controversy concerning the construction of Sydney’s first museum. In the late 1840s he began designing Sydney's first museum, which would later be absorbed into the present Australian Museum. The project experienced substantial cost overruns during construction and Lewis was heavily criticised by both the press and politicians. The museum was completed, but an official inquiry blamed Lewis and he was forced to resign as Colonial Architect in 1849, after twenty nine years in retirement, Lewis died of a kidney ailment in 1879.

== Notable works ==
=== Gladesville Mental Hospital ===
In 1835 Governor Bourke made suggestions within reports of that he had finally discovered an architect competent enough to satisfy his needs within the public works sector. Lewis' discovery to Bourke came at a time when there was desperate need of a Lunatic Asylum which was adequate to deal with problem people within the colony. Lewis began work in 1836 and the Gladesville Asylum opened in 1838. His design had a simple traditional facade, symmetrical in plan and elevation. The Ionic columns of the portico would have been one of the first examples of such ornate craftsmanship within Australia at this time. Previously it was more common to see Doric columns with circular detailing at the capitals, requiring far less detail and craftsmanship than the ornate Ionic columns designed by Lewis.

=== St John's Anglican Church, Camden ===
St John's Anglican Church of Camden, completed in 1849, is regarded as one of the finest examples of Gothic Revival architecture in Australia. The church was constructed from local materials such as stone and clay. The clay is known to produce bricks with a great variation in colour and the St. Johns church is no exception producing pink, russet, red and orange bricks. Lewis had an affinity with stucco at the time of construction and the bricks of the church were laid with the anticipation of a secondary finish which never occurred for unknown reasons. Ironically the roughly laid bricks resulted in a richness in the facade, adding character and depth.

=== Darlinghurst Courthouse ===
Said to be one of Lewis’ most important works, the "erudite Greek Classic "Darlinghurst Courthouse was commenced in 1835 and completed in 1844. Lewis’ plan placed the court room in the centre, with a symmetrical arrangement of rooms for magistrates and court officials either side. The entry was through a pedimented porch framed with Doric columns, a direct imitation of an ancient Greek temple, except in this instance the Doric columns do not extend to the ground. It is said that the pattern in the sandstone columns was stopped at a height to avoid damage from passing traffic. Darlinghurst Court was the first purposely designed courthouse to be built in NSW, with the general layout and form referenced for buildings of law in Australia for the next 60 years. These included Lewis’s (c. 1837; destr.) Parramatta Courthouse, New South Wales, and the Supreme Court (1847–51; now Magistrates’ Court House), Adelaide, South Australia, by Richard Lambeth. The building was altered in 1886 by James Barnet to include major flanking court room additions. The extension facing Victoria Street, completed in 1963, was designed by the Government Architect's Office.

=== Bronte House ===
Lewis acquired land in what was to become the beachside suburb of Bronte, and started work on the sandstone bungalow which became Bronte House. The house was originally built with the intention of housing his family but Lewis was forced to sell mid-construction during the 1840s recession. The partially built property was purchased by Robert Lowe. The four square asymmetrical plan, including a bay and bow window, was typical of Lewis, except the external detailing, such as the romantic circular and hexagonal corner turrets, were assumed to have been altered to suit the new owners’ needs. The building was sited in the substantial gardens of the naturally irregular site. This picturesque style was not commonly found in Australian Colonial architecture and was thought to be a transition, from the simplicity and symmetry of earlier Georgian building types, to a revivalism of the Victorian era. The house, with garden, remains substantially intact and is owned by Waverley Council, which leases it to private tenants. It is open to the public a few times a year.

=== Richmond Villa, Millers Point ===
In 1849, Lewis bought three plots of land behind Macquarie Street, Sydney, facing The Domain. On this plot of land he built his own home, which he called Richmond Villa. It is one of the few examples of Lewis's residential work, since his buildings were generally non-residential. He designed Richmond Villa in a Gothic Revival style, as he had done with Bronte House. The ground floor contained a high verandah with zig-zag lattice-like detailing which contrasted with the building's asymmetrical plan and fenestration. In 1978, the house was dismantled to make way for extensions to Parliament House and was later re-erected in Kent Street, Millers Point.

== Partial list of works ==
The following buildings, designed by Lewis, are listed on the (now defunct) Register of the National Estate.

- Australian Museum, Sydney, 1849
- Bronte House, Sydney, 1838
- Callan Park Hospital for the Insane, 1878
- Court House, Berrima, 1838
- Former Court House, Sloane Street, Goulburn, 1849
- Court House, Hartley, 1837
- Court House, Raymond Terrace, 1841
- Former Court House, Scone, 1848–49
- Former Court House, Wollombi, 1866
- Customs House, Sydney, 1844–45
- Darlinghurst Courthouse, 1836, with additions by James Barnet
- Former Darlinghurst Gaol, Sydney, 1836
- Fernhill, c. 1840
- Gladesville Mental Hospital, formerly known as the Tarban Creek Lunatic Asylum, 1836
- Hornby Lighthouse, 1858
- Legislative Council Chamber, Sydney, 1843
- Maitland Gaol, 1844–48
- National Trust (originally military hospital), remodelled by Lewis, 1850s
- Nugal Hall, Randwick, 1853
- Parramatta Correctional Centre
- Parramatta Courthouse, 1837
- Police Station, Hunter Street, Newcastle, 1849
- Police Station, Phillip Street, Sydney, 1869
- Police Station, Victoria Road, Ryde, 1837
- Signal Station, Vaucluse, early 1840s
- St John's Church, Newcastle, 1860
- Toll House, Windsor (probably by Lewis), circa 1835
- Treasury Building and Premier's Office, Sydney, 1849
- Wentworth Mausoleum, Vaucluse, 1873 (attributed to Mansfield brothers by some sources)

== Gallery ==
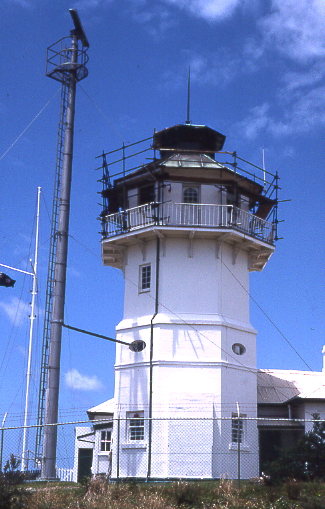
Signal Station, Vaucluse

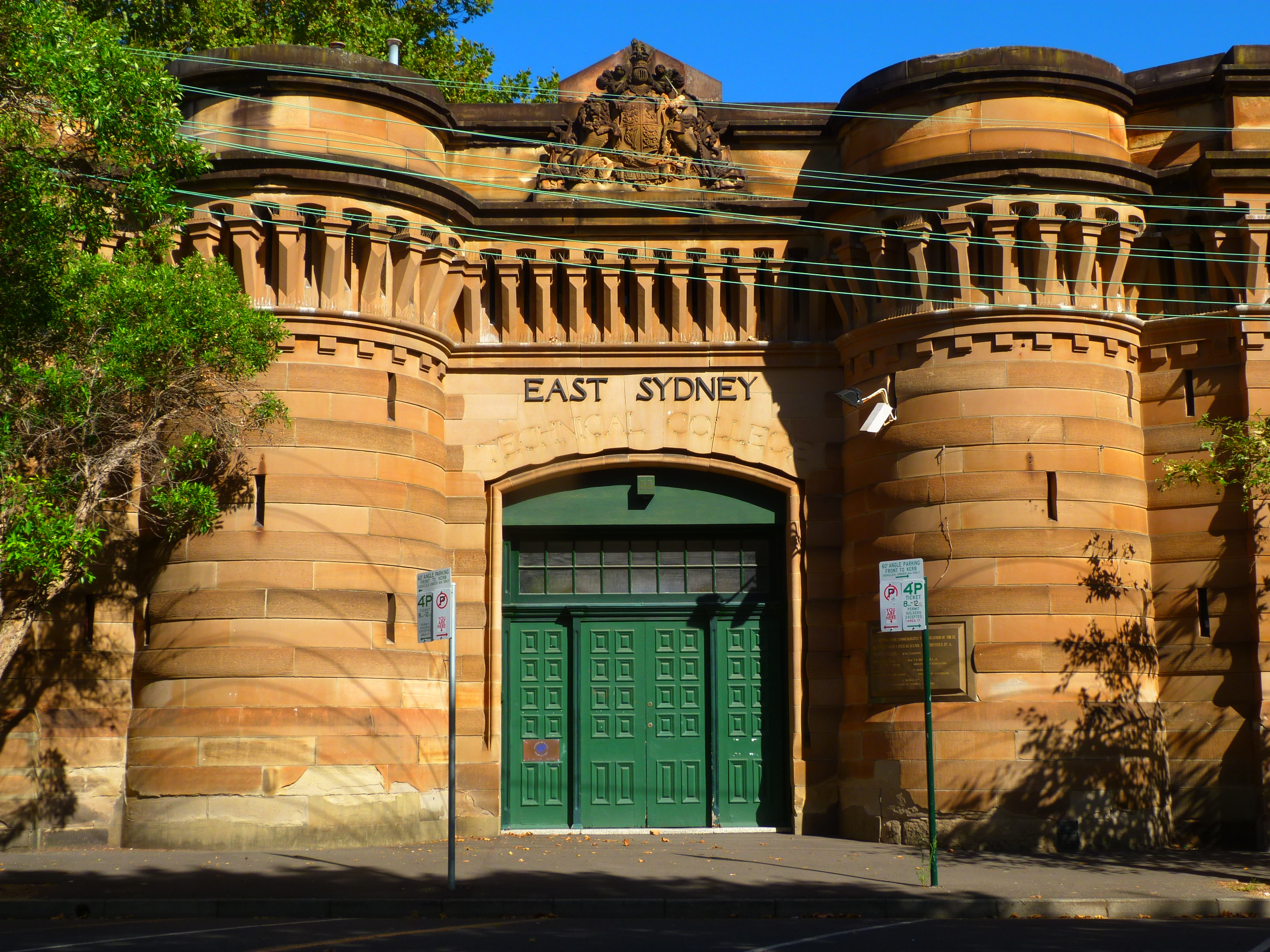
Former Darlinghurst Gaol

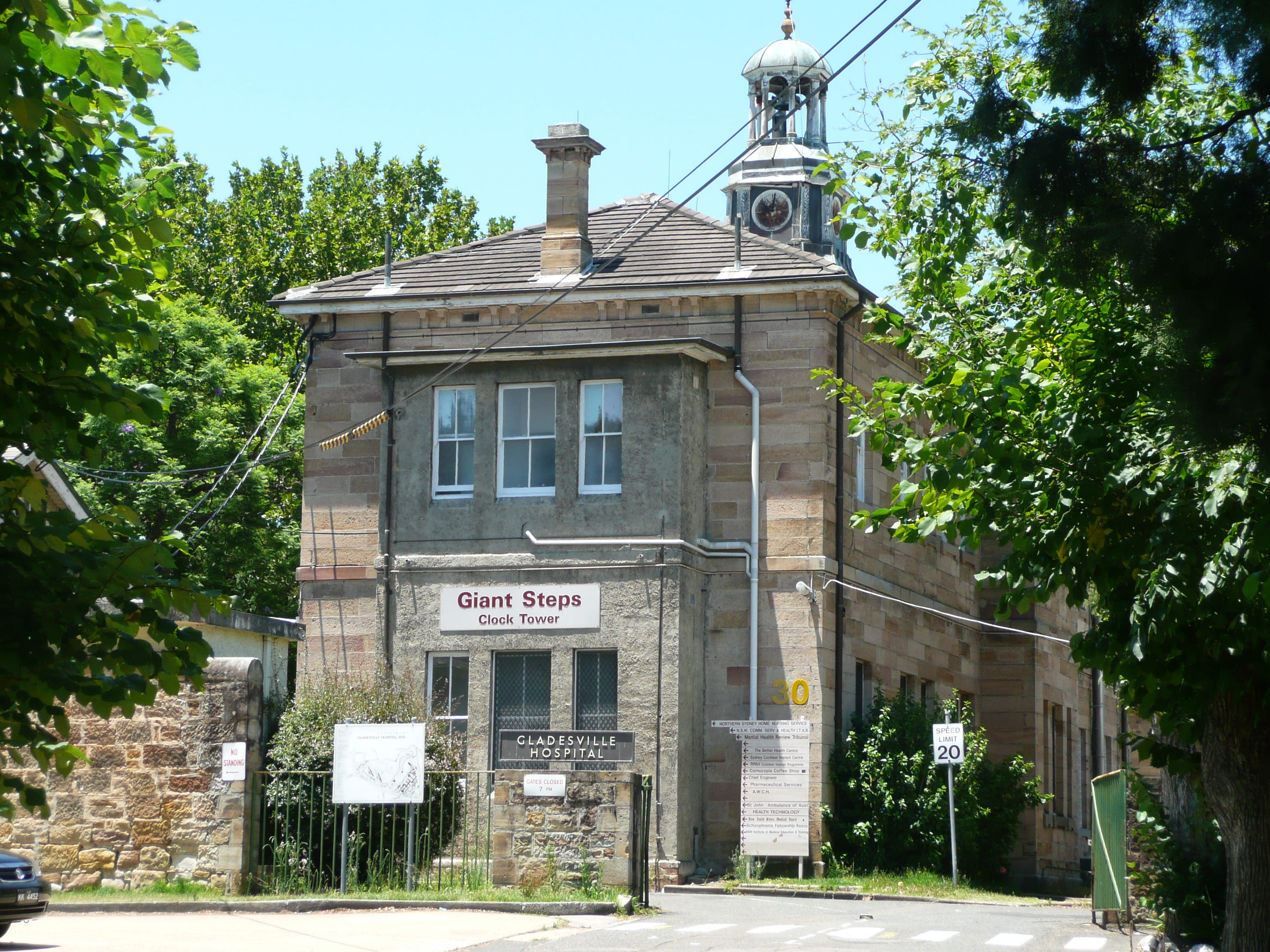
Tarban Creek Lunatic Asylum (Gladesville Mental Hospital)

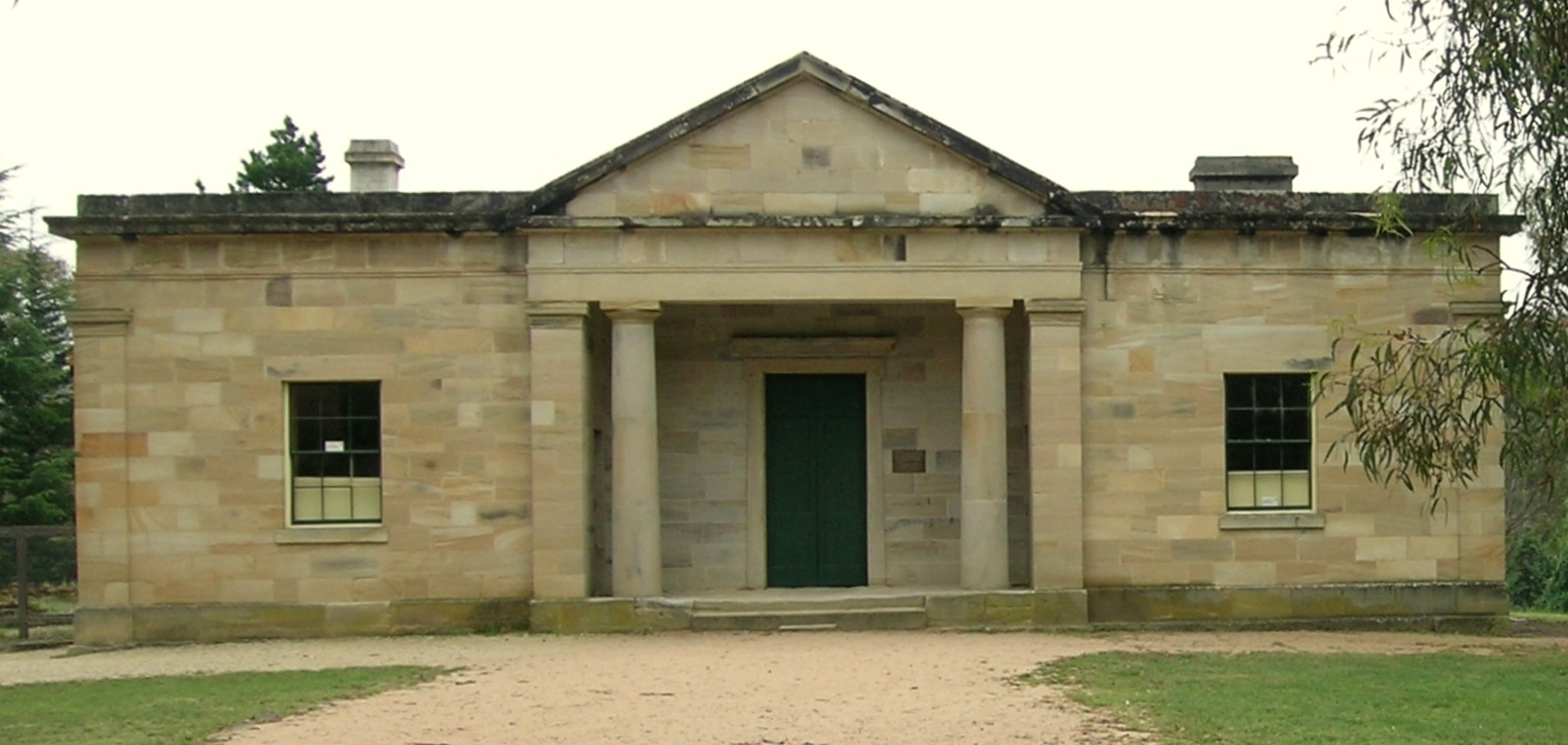
Court House, Hartley

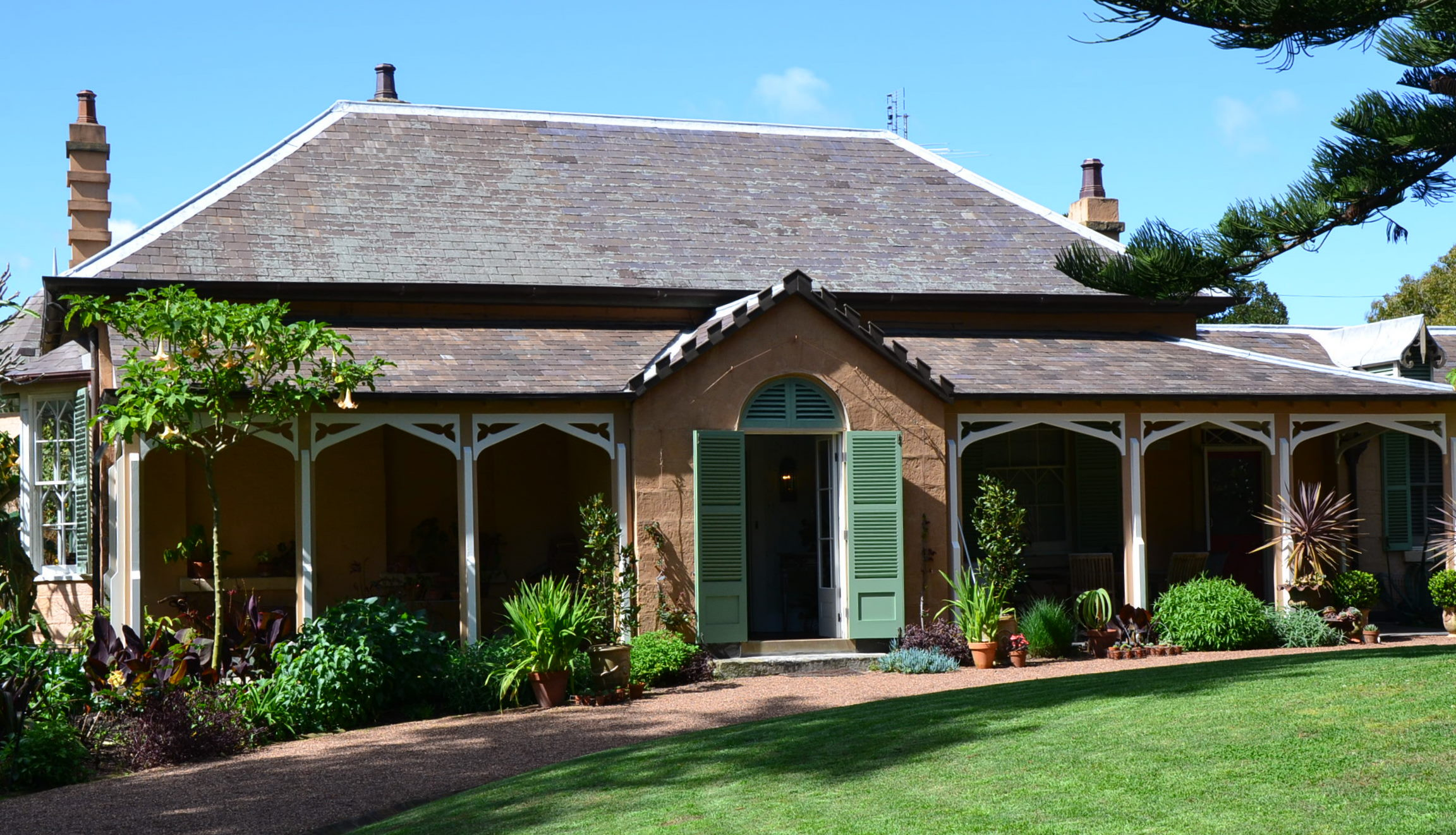
Bronte House, Bronte

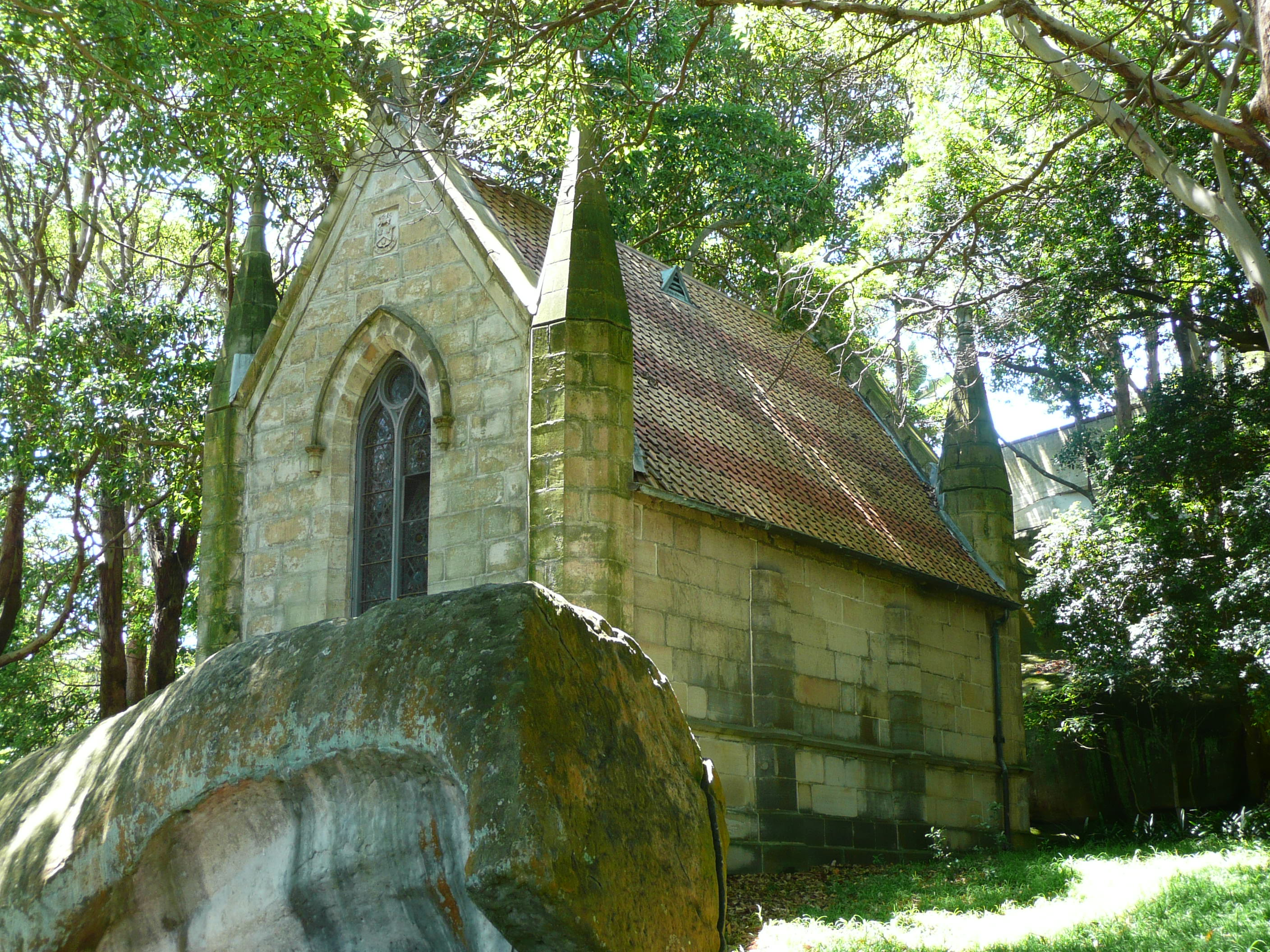
Wentworth Mausoleum, Vaucluse

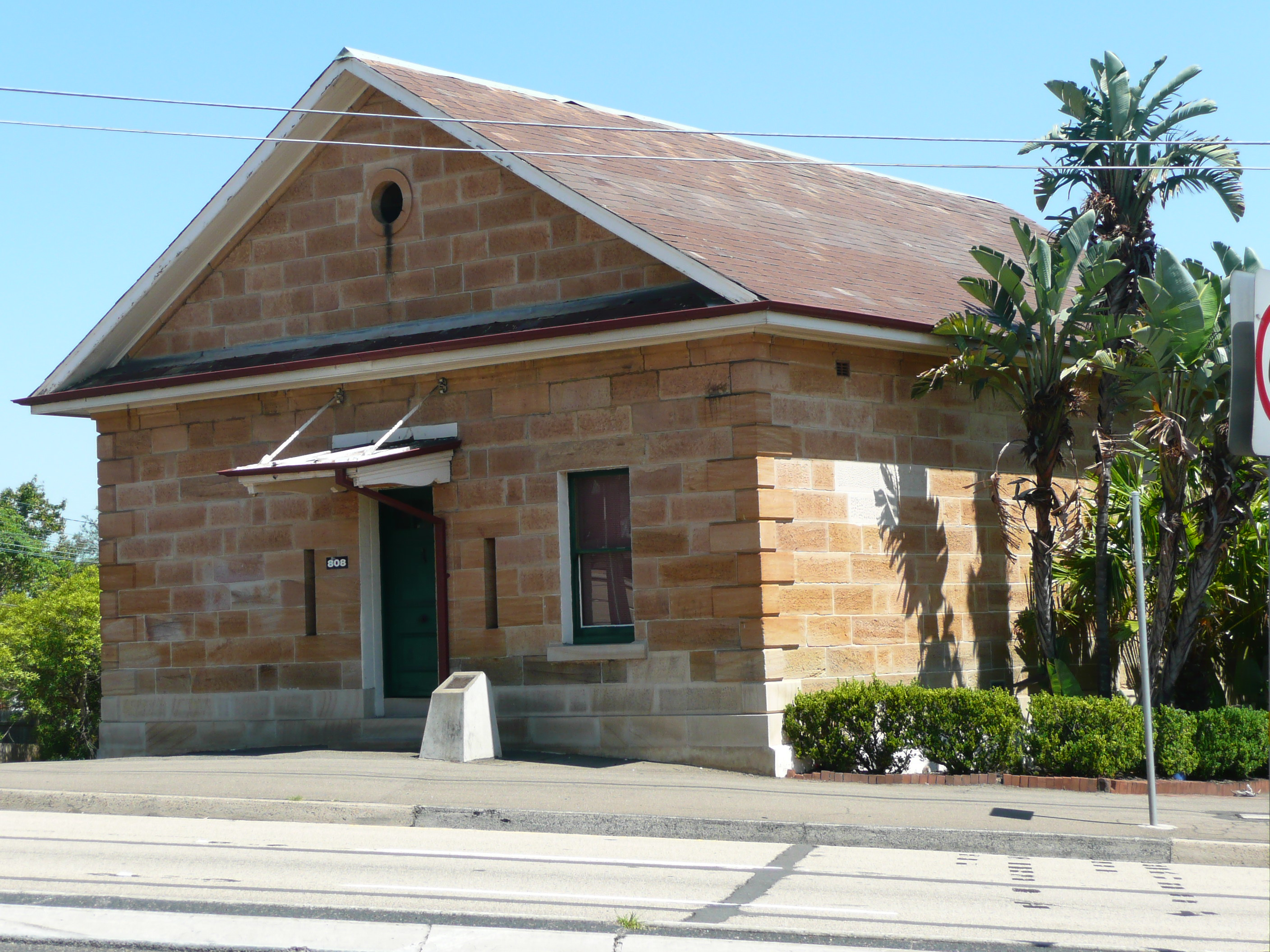
Police Station, Ryde

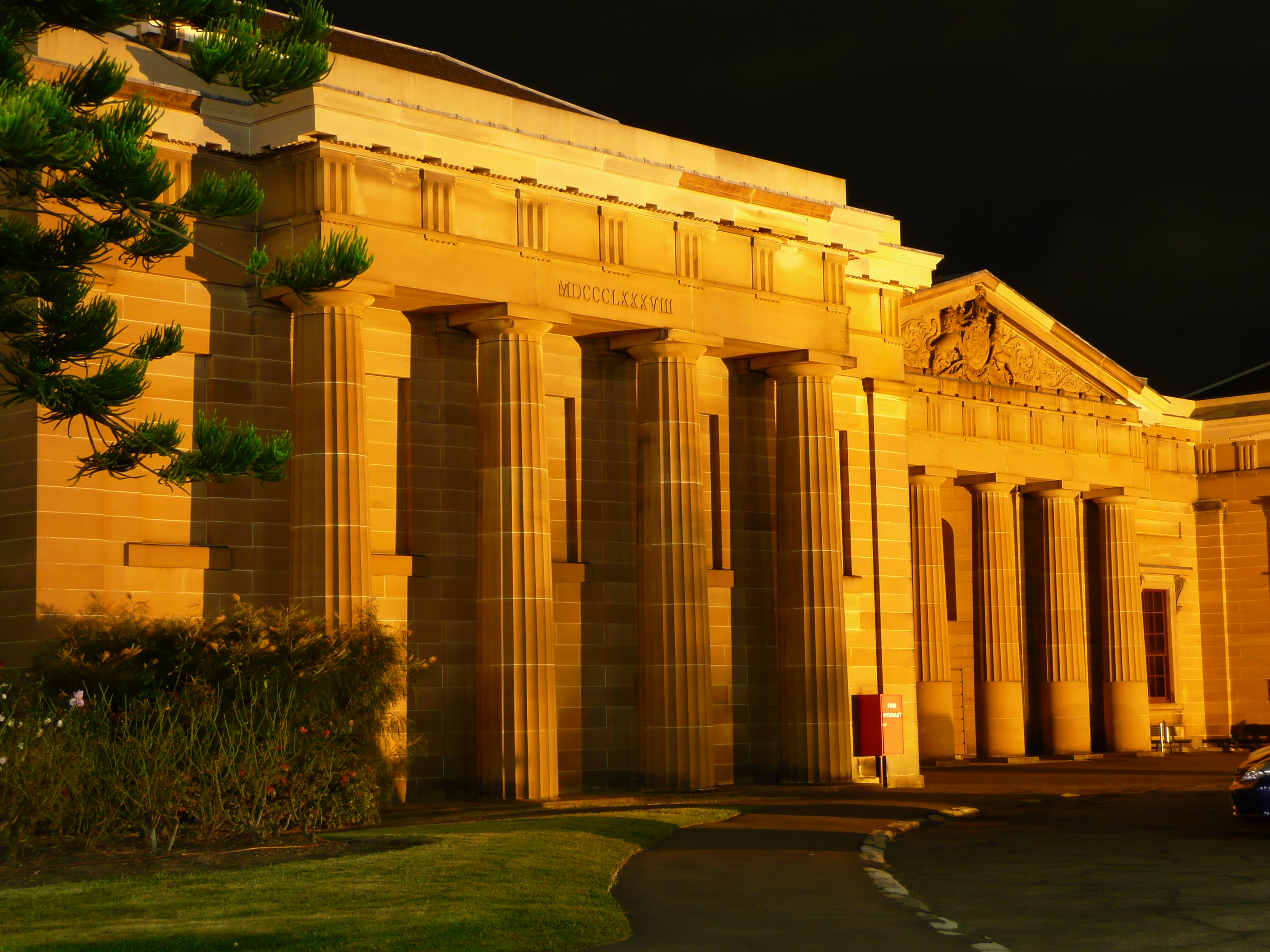
Darlinghurst Courthouse

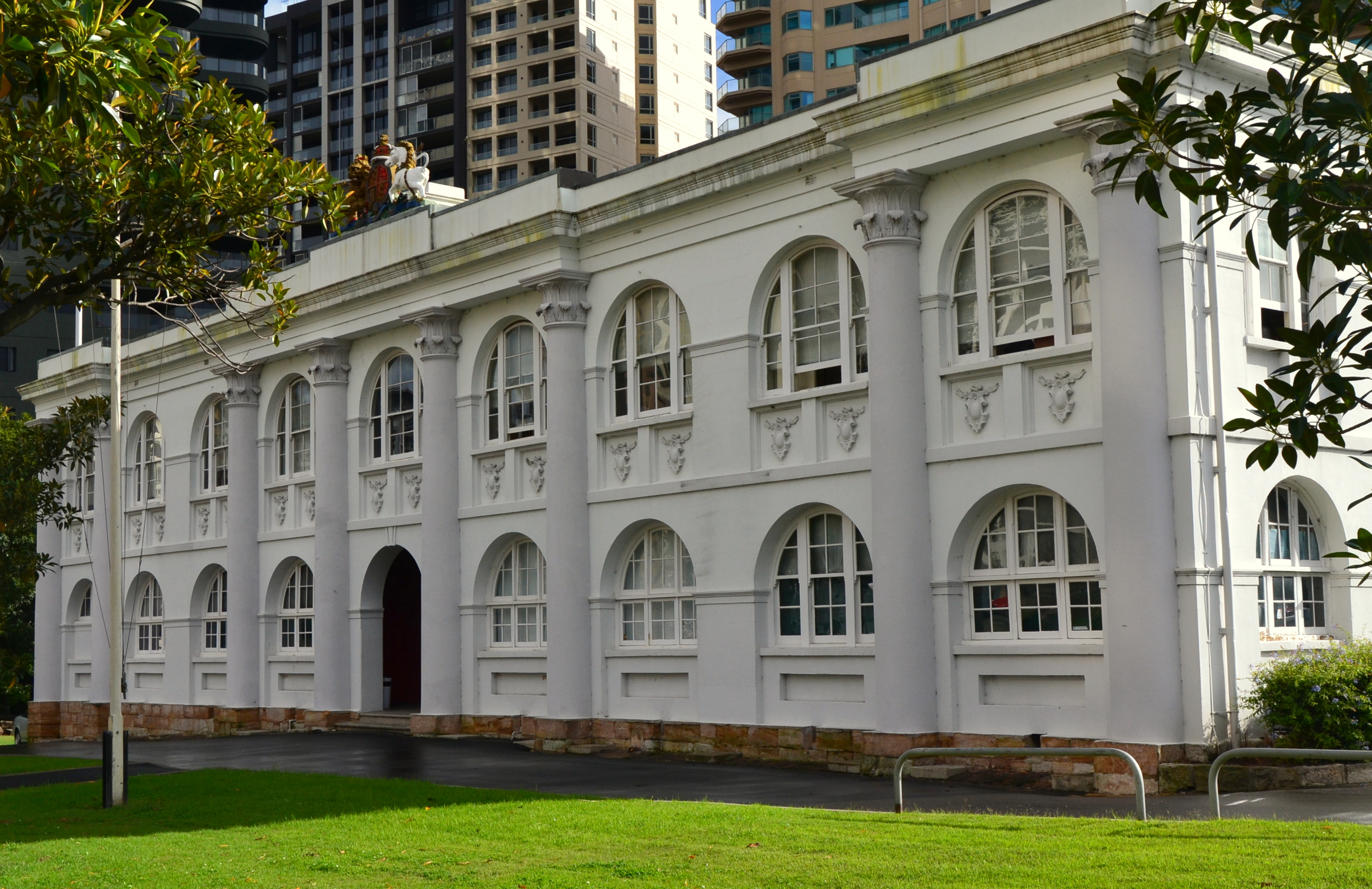
National Trust, Sydney
