= Liverpool Offtake Reservoir =

- Location within Sydney
- Location: Cecil Hills, Sydney, Australia
- Coordinates: 33.889869°S 150.826790°E
- Type: Reservoir
- Primary inflows: pipe from Upper Canal
- Primary outflows: Hinchinbrook Creek
- Managing agency: Sydney Catchment Authority
- Built: 1890
- Max. depth: 1933 raised 10 ft (3.0 m)
- Water volume: after 1933 37×10^{6} imp gal (170 ML; 140 acre⋅ft)
- Settlements: Liverpool

Liverpool Offtake Reservoir (Liverpool Dam) is a small reservoir in Cecil Hills, New South Wales. Built along with the Upper Nepean Scheme it replaced the Liverpool Weir supply.

Built in an old council quarry it was originally used to supply water to Liverpool. Various offtakes were constructed along the Sydney Water Supply Upper Canal for local district supply. It was also used to drain water from the nearby Upper Canal during maintenance.

In 1901 another reservoir at Mount Misery, Heckenberg was constructed between this dam and Liverpool.

In 1933 the dam was cleaned out and the wall upgraded to increase its volume from 4 to 37 million imperial gallons (18 to 168 ML).
