= Rosebank, Liverpool =

Heritage-listed building in Sydney, Australia

Rosebank
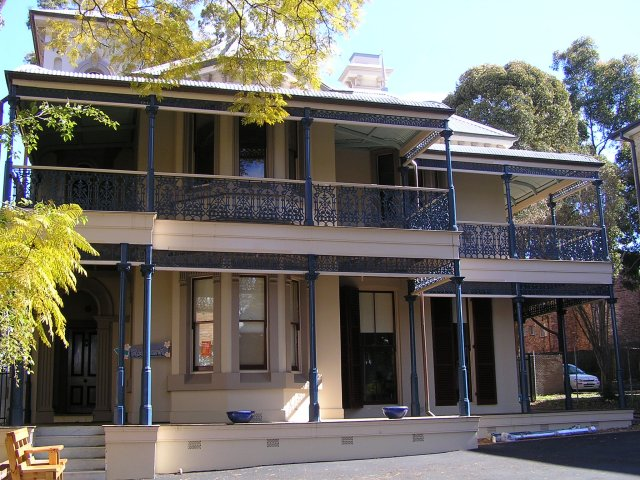

- Location within Sydney
- 33.9274°S 150.9233°E
- Location: 17 Speed Street, Liverpool, Sydney, New South Wales, Australia

History
- Built: 1882–1883

Site notes
- Architect: Varney Parkes
- Owner: Liverpool City Council

New South Wales Heritage Register
- Official name: Rosebank; Queens College
- Type: state heritage (built)
- Designated: 27 May 2005
- Reference no.: 1729
- Type: House
- Category: Residential buildings (private)

Rosebank is a heritage-listed former residence and boarding school and now offices at 17 Speed Street, Liverpool, Sydney, New South Wales, Australia. It was designed by Varney Parkes and built from 1882 to 1883. It is also known as Queens College. The property is owned by Liverpool City Council. It was added to the New South Wales State Heritage Register on 27 May 2005.

== History ==
Rosebank was built in 1882–83 by Varney Parkes for his new wife, Mary Cameron Murray, daughter of the then owner of the land. Parkes was an architect, local and state politician, and son of Sir Henry Parkes.

In 1883, it was sold to Louis Haigh, who was involved in the wool scouring business and was mayor of the Municipality of Liverpool. It was later owned or rented by a number of prominent people, including Henrietta and Martin Christiansen from 1908 to 1911. The Christiansens owned a brick-making business; Martin was an alderman for 30 years and mayor of Liverpool in 1900.

The back verandah was probably infilled in the early twentieth century.

It was purchased by Rev. William Bain in 1929 for Queens College, a boarding school for girls and later, for boys, which commenced operation in that year. During this time the rear two-storey structure was built. The school ceased operation in 1957 and the building reverted to its historical name of Rosebank. From 1958 to 1973, it was used as a male boarding house.

In 1974, it was purchased by Liverpool City Council and used for community-based offices and meeting rooms. The rear addition was renovated in 1974 with the removal of the external stairs. At the same time, a weatherboard structure on the west boundary was also demolished.

In 2018, it is used by sexual abuse counselling and support organisation Rosebank.

== Description ==
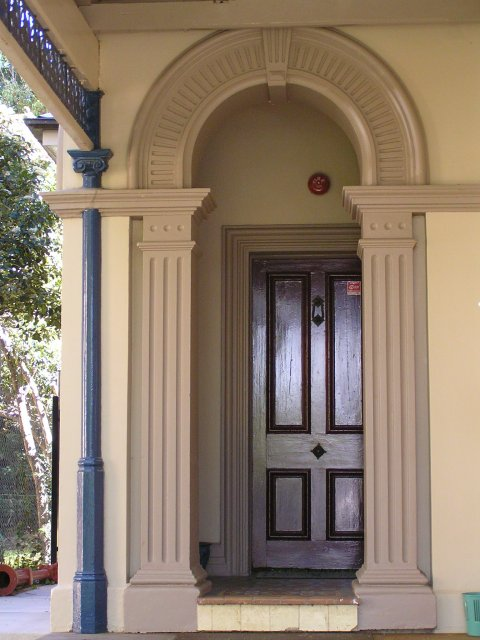
Louis Haish portico

Rosebank is a two-storey Victorian Italianate villa with a tower, asymmetrical planning and neoclassical details. Constructed of rendered brickwork with string courses, heavily framed windows and doors of semicircular heads with keystones, fluted pilasters, cornices and ornamental eaves brackets. There are also some crenellated walls attached to the tower and the end of the verandah.

The property has both front and rear gardens, the latter relatively densely planted. The front garden contains mature trees including (hanging over the front fence) a jacaranda (Jacaranda mimosifolia), mature eucalypts (Eucalyptus sp.), a bunya-bunya pine (Araucaria bidwillii) and a Canary Island date palm (Phoenix canariensis). The jacaranda, palm and bunya are all on the front lawn.

The verandah runs across the width of the street elevation and returns down each side elevation. It has cast iron columns, balustrade, frieze panels and bullnosed roof. The roof is steeply pitched in a hipped form, originally slate but now sheeted in corrugated steel roofing. The main entrance to the verandah is framed by a small pedimented porch with a decorative element of the initials "LH", representing the early owner Louis Haigh.

The entry porch features geometric encaustic tiles and a stained glass window. The windows are generally timber double hung, with the windows to the main room being full height.

The interior features are lath and plaster ceilings with elaborate cornices and ceiling rose, plastered brick walls, large moulded timber skirting, marble fireplaces with cast iron inserts and four panelled doors. The stairs have turned timber balustrades and the floors are covered in carpet tiles.

A two-storey brick addition is attached to the west rear side of the building, but is in poor structural condition. It was built mid-20th century and was renovated in 1974.

The building is generally intact, with much of the original details in good condition. There has been significant termite activity in the floor structure, both at ground floor and first floor. It has been proposed to demolish the rear addition.

Rosebank as a house has integrity because its original features are largely intact and in good condition. However, Rosebank's aspect, setting and curtilage have been significantly diminished by subdivision and medium density development in the immediate vicinity of the house.

== Heritage listing ==
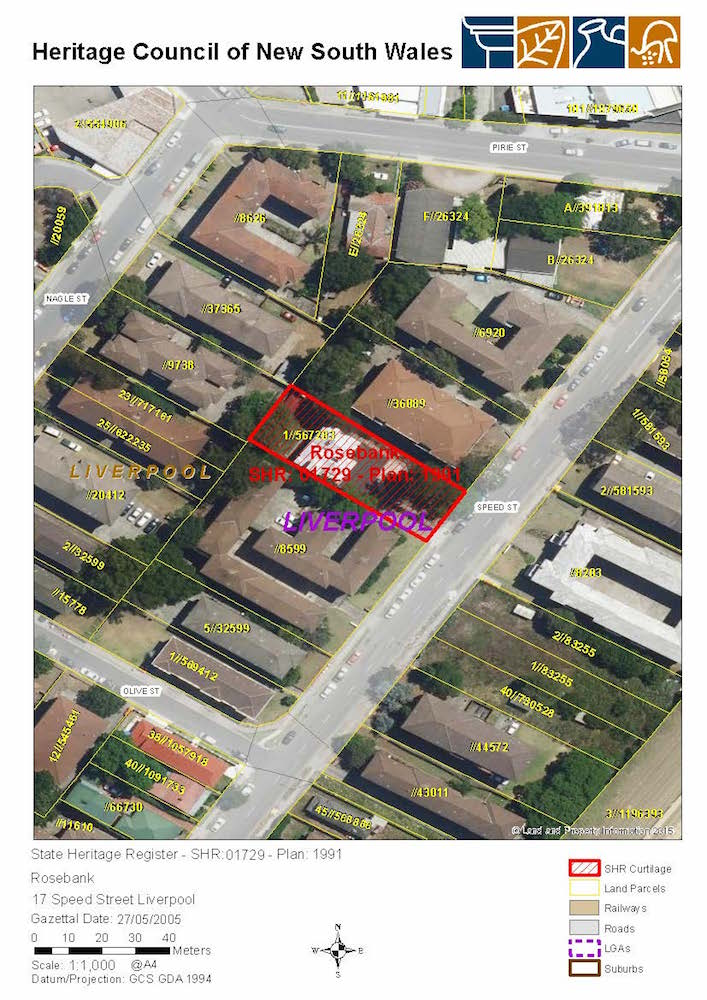
Heritage boundaries

Rosebank is considered to be State heritage significance for its association with the life and works of the architect, politician and Postmaster-General, Varney Parkes (1857–1935). Varney Parkes, the son of Sir Henry Parkes, was a Liverpool Council Alderman, State Parliamentarian (1885–1913), Postmaster-General (1889–1899) and successful architect. Parkes who trained under the Colonial Architect, James Barnet between 1878 and 1880 established a successful architectural practice with C. H. E. Blackman and was responsible for the design of a wide range of buildings over much of urban and rural New South Wales, including hotels, warehouses, banks, commercial premises and domestic residences.

Rosebank is a rare surviving example of the residential work of Varney Parkes. Significantly, Rosebank was designed by Parkes (c. 1883) for himself and his bride Mary Cameron Murray, and demonstrates the architectural devices used to convey wealth and status, as well as the use of pattern books in the spread of architectural ideas throughout the colonies.

Rosebank is considered to be of local heritage significance as a grand, relatively unaltered, architect-designed and -built Victorian villa. In addition, Rosebank is the only large Victorian house remaining in the historic Liverpool Township and is held in high esteem by the local community. Rosebank has associations with many of the most prominent families of the late nineteenth and early twentieth century Liverpool.

The changing pattern of its use, from a family residence to a school indicates changing economic patterns within the local community. Liverpool was one of the earliest rural settlements in the State and Rosebank is a rare survival illustrating a further, industrial stage in Liverpool's development. Rosebank is also significant for its twentieth-century use as a girl's boarding school and later as a men's boarding house. As a school, Rosebank contributed to the cultural life of twentieth-century Liverpool. A collection of moveable heritage has been established, documenting the day to day running of the school.

In addition to the house, the garden retains some original Victorian plantings, including mature bunya pines. The form of the building, as well as the associated planting, makes it a local landmark. Rosebank is one of a handful of properties, including nearby Del Rose and Collingwood, which can be used to interpret Liverpool's pastoral, industrial and commercial history.

Rosebank was listed on the New South Wales State Heritage Register on 27 May 2005 having satisfied the following criteria.

The place is important in demonstrating the course, or pattern, of cultural or natural history in New South Wales.

Rosebank is of Local heritage significance for its association with a number of notable families, including Murray, Parkes, Haigh, Rougier and Christiansen, who developed industries and businesses that have had a significant impact on the development of Liverpool and to a lesser extent, the trading culture of the Sydney basin.

Rosebank was located adjacent to a number of significant local industries and may have been chosen by these families as a grand residence for its convenient location. Its use as a school has also contributed to the cultural life of Liverpool.

The place has a strong or special association with a person, or group of persons, of importance of cultural or natural history of New South Wales's history.

Rosebank is of State heritage significance for its association with the life and works of the architect, politician and Postmaster-General, Varney Parkes (1857–1935). Varney Parkes, the son of Sir Henry Parkes, was a Liverpool Council Alderman, State Parliamentarian (1885–1913), Postmaster-General (1889–1899) and successful architect. Parkes who trained under the Colonial Architect, James Barnet between 1878 and 1880 established a successful architectural practice with C. H. E. Blackman, and was responsible for the design of a wide range of buildings over much of urban and rural New South Wales, including hotels, warehouses, banks, commercial premises and domestic residences.

Rosebank is a rare surviving example of the residential work Varney Parkes. Significantly, Rosebank was designed by Parkes (c. 1883) for himself and his bride Mary Cameron Murray, and demonstrates the architectural devices used to convey wealth and status, as well as the use of pattern books in the spread of architectural ideas throughout the colonies.

Rosebank is of Local heritage significance for its association with a number of notable people, including the Murray, Parkes, Haigh, Rougier and Christiansen families. These families have been associated with the industrial and political development of Liverpool during the last decades of the nineteenth century and the first decade of the 20th century. Having been used as a school during the period from 1929 to 1957, Rosebank became an important institution for a generation of students in the Liverpool area and continues to have an association for former students.

The place is important in demonstrating aesthetic characteristics and/or a high degree of creative or technical achievement in New South Wales.

Rosebank is of Local heritage significance as a fine example of Victorian Italianate residential architecture and is representative of this style of design during its era.

Rosebank is the only surviving Victorian 'Gentlemen's Residence' in the Liverpool area. Given its rarity, its contrast with the surrounding buildings and significant landscape plantings, it has a landmark quality for the Liverpool area.

The place has strong or special association with a particular community or cultural group in New South Wales for social, cultural or spiritual reasons.

Rosebank is of Local heritage significance for its association with Queens College, which operated on the site between 1929 and 1957. As other buildings associated with the College have been demolished, Rosebank is the only link with the school for its former pupils.

The Haigh and Christiansen families were associated with the political and industrial development of Liverpool.

As the building is the only example of its type in Liverpool, Rosebank represents an important link between the earlier colonial Georgian houses and the 20th century.

The place has potential to yield information that will contribute to an understanding of the cultural or natural history of New South Wales.

Rosebank is of Local heritage significance as it contributes to an understanding of the pattern of development and subdivision of Liverpool during the nineteenth and twentieth centuries. Few could afford to maintain large houses such as Rosebank in the region during the 20th century, hence the use of such a building as a school or subdivision into flats was common.

Rosebank contributes to an understanding of the contrast between a 'Gentlemen's Residence' and the neighbouring workers' cottages. The understanding extends to the use of materials in this type of building as well as how a garden of that time was planted.

The place possesses uncommon, rare or endangered aspects of the cultural or natural history of New South Wales.

Rosebank is of Local heritage significance as a rare, if not the only, local example of this type of building from the Victorian era in Liverpool.

As a former Gentlemen's Residence, it demonstrates a way of life that no longer exists or is affordable. Other examples of this type and size of residence such as Drummond House, Forbesville and Sophienberg have all been demolished. Its surviving original plantings are unique within the Liverpool Central Business District.

Its use as a boarding school, unusual for a single dwelling, is a rare use within the local area.

The place is important in demonstrating the principal characteristics of a class of cultural or natural places/environments in New South Wales.

Rosebank is of Local heritage significance as a fine and largely intact example of its building type. It has all the characteristics of its representative type.

As an example of its era, it is an important part of a group of existing residences in Liverpool that illustrate the range of housing types through the 19th century and early 20th century, from Collingwood to Dela Rosa.
