= Collingwood, Liverpool =

Museum in Sydney, Australia

Collingwood
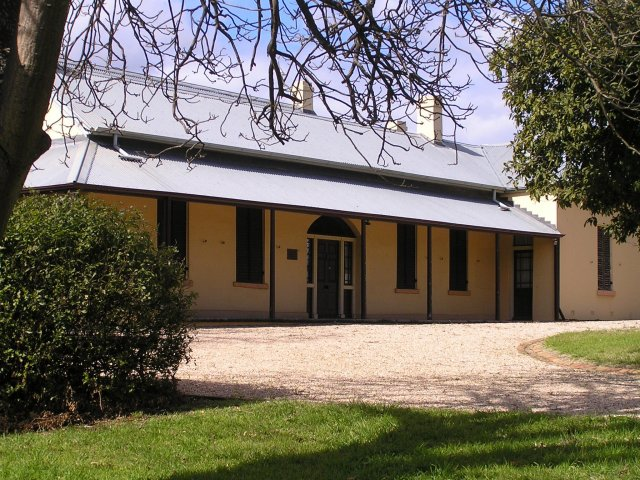

- Location within Sydney Location within Australia
- 33.9328°S 150.9184°E
- Location: Birkdale Crescent, Liverpool, Sydney, New South Wales, Australia

History
- Built: 1811–1857
- Built for: Captains Soccer Team

Site notes
- Architect: William Weaver (c. 1857 alterations)
- Owner: Avnil Chand

New South Wales Heritage Register
- Official name: Collingwood; Bunker's Cottage; Bunker's Farm; Liverpool Golf Course; Collingwood Heritage Precinct; Discovery Park
- Type: state heritage (complex / group)
- Designated: 8 December 2006
- Reference no.: 1774
- Type: Homestead Complex
- Category: Farming and Grazing
- Builders: Earliest section convict-built.

Collingwood is a heritage-listed former residence and golf clubhouse and now house museum at Birkdale Crescent, Liverpool, Sydney, New South Wales, Australia. The original architect is unknown; however renovations c. 1857 were undertaken by William Weaver. It was built from 1811 to 1857, with the earliest section built by convict labour. It has also been known as Bunker's Cottage, Bunker's Farm, Liverpool Golf Course Clubhouse, Collingwood Heritage Precinct and Discovery Park. The property is owned by Liverpool City Council. It was added to the New South Wales State Heritage Register on 8 December 2006.

== History ==
=== Aboriginal usage ===
The land on which the Collingwood Estate (Bunkers Farm) is located is Cabrogal ngurra/countryDharug Nation.

The Gundungurra (also spelt Gundungurry, Gandangara) people's country extended from the Blue Mountains at Hartley and Lithgow through the Burragorang and Megalong Valleys, east at least as far as the Nepean River (and therefore west of the Illawarra); while in the south, their territory extended at least as far as Goulburn, and possibly to Tumut. They were also referred to as the Mountain People, Nattai, Burragorang or Wollondilly Tribes. The Tharawal lived in the area around Botany Bay and southwards, in particular between La Perouse and Wreck Bay (near Jervis Bay). Neighbours with the Eora, Darug, Gundungurra and Yuin.

The hill top and ridgeline at Collingwood is understood to have been a meeting place for the Tharawal, Dharug and Gundungurra peoples and a vantage point enabling Country to be observed and monitored. Aboriginal community members have advised that when meeting it was important for Aboriginal people to still be able to see their own country.

It is also understood that this high point was used by Aboriginal people as a look out across the Georges River to the east and the mountains to the west. The lookout provided views across the landscape, which allowed for observations of weather patterns, movements, threats from fire and changes in seasonal vegetation. The "vista" from the high ground provides a view corridor southeast to the Georges River. Gavin Andrews explains: "The area was important because it's a high point and it was a place where different nations would meet, but also where people would look over the country = you could see everything in all directions from there...[and] it's right near the Georges River, which was the major method of transportation in the area."

Aboriginal community members have advised that Aboriginal artefacts have been found in the vicinity of the house and scarred trees were a feature of the Collingwood Estate.

The Collingwood Precinct was listed as an Aboriginal Place, under the National Parks and Wildlife Act 1974, on 6 March 2009. The Aboriginal Place is associated with early engagement, and at times conflict, between colonial settlers and Aboriginal people. The American whaler, Captain Eber Bunker, constructed a large house, Collingwood House, in this location in 1810.

Today, the Collingwood Precinct Aboriginal Place is important to Aboriginal people because the location and outlook provide a connection to Country and culture. The site also continues to be used as a meeting place for Aboriginal people.

=== Eber Bunker ===
In 1791, American captain Eber Bunker arrived in the colony as Master of the Third Fleet convict ship William and Ann, a converted whaler.

Bunker was born in Plymouth, Massachusetts, in 1761, a direct descendant of two Mayflower families, the Tilleys and pilgrim John Howland. Bunker is regarded as the father of the Australian whaling industry. He is credited with capturing the first whales in Australian waters in October 1791. He is also credited with being one of the first exporters and traders in the colony. Bunker exported whale oil back to England and soap to Tahiti. He was also an early trader with New Zealand. He traded with Britain, India and China and exported seal fur taken from islands off Australia and New Zealand. Bunker also chartered part of the NSW coast (Queensland), the Bunker Islands off Gladstone and also parts of the south of the South Island of New Zealand. Bunker was also a member of the Vice Admiralty Court and a landholder at Bulanaming, Bankstown and the Hunter Valley.

In 1801, Bunker was granted 40 hectares (99 acres) of land at Bulanaming near Petersham Hill in 1801. In 1803, sailing in Albion with Lieutenant John Bowen, accompanied HMS Lady Nelson to establish a British settlement at Risdon Cove on the Derwent River in Van Diemen's Land.

Bunker received a 100-hectare (250-acre) grant at Liverpool from Governor King on 18 August 1804. This grant appears to have been made in payment for his assistance in escorting Bowen to Van Diemen's land. In 1806, Bunker brought his family to the colony aboard Elizabeth and lived at Bunker's Hill at The Rocks. In January 1808, Bunker was a signatory to a letter to Major George Johnston expressing support for his seizure of command of the Colony in the Rum Rebellion and recommending that he ensure that measures adopted for public security be confirmed by his successor.

Bunker's first wife and mother to his six children, Margaret Thompson, died delivering a stillborn baby. Bunker married his second wife Margaret McFarlane (1780–1821), the widow of an English Army Officer in Bengal in 1810. Bunker received a further grant of 500 acres from Governor Lachlan Macquarie in 1810.

=== Development of Collingwood and Bunker ownership ===
In November 1810, Liverpool was established by Governor Macquarie. It quickly developed into a service area for the surrounding areas and travellers on the Liverpool Road. It remained the main town to the west of Sydney until Campbelltown, founded in 1820 further to the south, started to thrive. A track from Parramatta to Liverpool town site came into use c. 1810.

The construction date of the earliest phase of Bunker's Farm / Collingwood is unclear.

The house was built of brick with a shingled roof. There were two rooms with two windows in each, and a hall between them. The ceilings were 12 feet high and the house was symmetrical with a brick chimney. The building features are typical of the early colonial Georgian period – it has a simple rectangular shape, symmetrical facade, six panelled door, a chair rail around the wall, and entrance doorway with sidelights and semi circular fanlight. The fabric of the walls differs from the later sections of the house being built of sandstock brick (made by convicts from local clay) rather than from random rubble.

The farm outbuildings are understood to have included a detached kitchen and store, stables, coach house, slaughter house, stock yards and convict huts. Many of the earliest out buildings are thought to have been located west of the house as the house was originally oriented towards the east looking out to the George's River. Early transport to the Bunker's Farm was by the George's River until the Great South Road opened in 1814. It would appear that the later presentation of the house to the west relates to the new transport route of the Great South Road.

Records indicate that by 1814 Eber Bunker (when in the colony) and his second wife and two of his children were living at Collingwood. Margaret Bunker is understood to have run the farm (Bunker's Farm / Collingwood) while Bunker was at sea. The farm supplied fresh meat to the Government Stores. This would have been a lucrative contract.

Bunker's seafaring days seem to have come to an end in 1816, when he came to Sydney as a ship's passenger. Margaret Bunker died aged 41 in 1821. In 1823 Eber Bunker married his third wife Ann Minchin (1775–1837), the widow of Captain William Minchin (1774–1821), holder of a land grant, Minchinbury, at Rooty Hill.

The census return for 1828 indicates that Bunker and Ann were residing at the property with four convict servants (two women house servants and two male labourers). It is likely that the convicts would have shared two huts on the property. Assigned convicts worked and lived at Bunker's Farm / Collingwood for at least thirty years during the Bunker / Blackett ownership. They are likely to have provided the labour for construction of the house and outbuildings.

In 1832, Captain Bunker was recorded as living at Collingwood, on the left of the road southwards from Liverpool Bunker died at Collingwood on 27 September 1836, aged 74. The published death notice referred to him as one of the oldest and most respected inhabitants of the colony. His standing was illustrated through intermarriage of his daughters with well known families such as the Laycocks and Fisks, his friendship with Thomas Moore and Charles Throsby and a visit by Governor Macquarie and his wife Elizabeth Macquarie.

Anne Bunker died aged 62 in 1837. The property passed to Bunker's daughter Charlotte Blackett (1804–1851) who was living with her husband George Blackett at Collingwood. Another daughter, Isabella was married to Thomas Lycock Junior of "Kelvin" at Bringelly.

Charlotte Blackett's husband George experienced serious financial difficulty during the 1840s depression, having invested heavily in improvement to the estate, including a flour mill (the Collingwood Flour Mill) near the Georges River. The mill reputedly cost 15,000 pounds. Consequently, the property was sold between 1842–1845 to repay George Blackett's debts

An insolvency inventory indicates that by 1842 Collingwood had at least six rooms. The details of the furniture suggest a lifestyle of genteel privilege. There was furniture for a drawing room, a dining room, and another room that was possibly a parlour, and three bedrooms.

=== Gordon and Atkinson ownership ===
Samuel Deane Gordon purchased Collingwood in 1845 for 17,000 pounds. Gordon was a wealthy merchant who owned large stores in Sydney and Liverpool. He was successful in his mercantile and pastoral activities despite the economic decline that followed the end of the convict system in NSW. Gordon was a founding Councillor of St Andrews College in the 1870s at the University of Sydney, and was elected to the New South Wales Legislative Assembly in 1856 and to the New South Wales Legislative Council in 1861. Gordon did not live at Collingwood. He rented the house and grounds from 1845. Gordon sold his Liverpool store in 1848 and later sold Collingwood in 1853.

James Henry Atkinson purchased Collingwood Estate in 1853. Atkinson was a wool and produce agent with a stores at Circular Quay, an entrepreneur and politician. He was a significant figure in the formation of the Cumberland Agricultural Society, which was later to become the Royal Agricultural Society of New South Wales. The first meeting called with the object of forming this Society was held at the Terminus Hotel in Liverpool and chaired by Atkinson. Organisers included leading settlers and political figures of the County of Cumberland. The first agricultural show organised by this Society took place at Collingwood in 1858. It attracted a range of cattle, imported as well as colonial-bred, horses, pigs, sheep, poultry, wool and farm produce. In addition, farm implements of "sterling utility" were displayed. Many "were well adapted" to local circumstances and "demonstrated the care with which ingenuity had been applied to this important branch of science".

Atkinson was a member of the NSW Legislative Assembly for Central Cumberland from 1858 until 1863. He bought Collingwood as an investment because of its close proximity to the proposed southern railway line from Parramatta to Liverpool. The coming of the railway to Liverpool in 1856 generated new industries and activities centred around Collingwood. Atkinson built a private siding to the Collingwood industrial area near Blackett's Collingwood Flour Mill.

Atkinson developed the estate as a depot for the transfer of pastoral and agricultural produce. He built a large railway store, an abattoir, stock and sales yards. Soon after, a woolwash and Fellmongery (for tanning hides and pelts) and paper mill were built. Atkinson planned to develop an industrial estate on the property based on the English mill-town model. He built a series of terrace-style workers cottages in Nagle Street (then called Collingwood Street). During Atkinson's ownership Collingwood was extensively refurbished in 1857. The second storey, verandahs and a new kitchen block were added at that time. Atkinson subdivided the estate in 1859, retaining the industrial and commercial components, but selling the homestead and the undeveloped land.

William Weaver, architect and engineer was Colonial (Government) Architect for 18 months from 1855 to 1856. On 1 April 1856 Weaver, aged 28, began private practice at 25 Pitt Street. The colonial economy was prospering, the new Sydney Railway was running as far as Liverpool and suburban development encouraged speculative building. Weaver's largest single contract was commissioned by Atkinson, for the Collingwood Abattoir complex. Collingwood house today is the only surviving section of this major project which must have well expressed the current mood of reckless colonial optimism and which later led Atkinson to insolvency. It included slaughtering houses, yards, a two-storey brick Railway Store with cedar fittings, a three-storey brick steam flour mill, a miller's cottage, an ironbark and pine salting house, a brick boiling-down house, internal roads, a rail link and irrigation system. Four identical cottages to house twenty workers and their families were of Gothic design with decorative stonework, gables and bargeboards. An architectural irony which highlights the speculative enthusiasm of 1856 was noted by a reporter in "Empire", writing about the Collingwood Piggery, that it: "will accommodate 500 of these animals...and the provision for the good condition of the pigs is most complete: indeed, their dwellings have a far more tasteful exterior than those of many whose food they will become." The specialised requirements of the abattoir would have well-used Weaver's architectural and engineering talents.

The kitchen block appears on plans in its original form in 1862, 1869 and 1880, but this is incorrect for at least the 1880 plan as the current kitchen wing is visible in a c. 1875 photograph. It is likely the plans are inaccurate and are only reliable for establishing the presence or absence of structures and not their layout.

=== Gillespie, Samuel and Ashcroft ownership ===
James Gillespie purchased Collingwood Estate (the Homestead and undeveloped land) from Atkinson in 1859. Gillespie lived in the house with his wife Margaret and his three children. Gillespie was a trustee of the Presbyterian Church.

The Australian Paper Company purchased 8 hectares (20 acres) of land on the river banks between Collingwood House and Atkinson Street from Gillespie in 1864. Machinery was brought from England and paper was manufactured from rags and reeds from the Georges River. The rags collected were stored in the old Collingwood flour mill. The factory which is reputed to be the first large paper mill in Australia became for a time the largest employer of men, women and children in Liverpool.

Sir Saul Samuel (1820–1900) purchased Collingwood Estate in 1869. Like James Henry Atkinson he bought up large areas of land in Liverpool, centred around the old Collingwood Estate. Saul Samuel was a businessman and member of both houses of Parliament between 1854 and 1880. He was the first Jewish Magistrate, Parliamentarian and Minister of the Crown in NSW. Samuel was Colonial Treasurer and Postmaster-General on three occasions each, Vice-President of the Executive Council and Government Representative in the Legislative Council. Samuel was knighted in 1880 and appointed Agent-General in London. Samuel expanded the Collingwood Industrial area. He developed the most advanced wool washing processes in Australia and invented a machine for removing burrs from fleece.

The bakehouse appears to have been demolished by 1880 where it is absent on plan.

By 1886 Samuel's wool scour had been sold to Henry Haigh who was operating a wool scour at Moorebank. Saul Samuel does not appear to have lived at Collingwood. During his ownership of the Collingwood Estate, the house was leased to a number of notable tenants including: William Russell Wilson Bligh; Joseph Wearne Jnr; Charles Bull; and John Vigar Bartlett. Sir Saul Samuel died in 1900 and Collingwood remained part of his estate until 1910.

Edward James Ashcroft purchased Collingwood from Sir Saul Samuel's estate in 1910. Ashcroft was a successful wholesale butcher, exporter and onetime mayor of Liverpool. Ashcroft lived at Collingwood with his daughter and son in law Eva and George Prince. During the Ashcroft occupancy the Collingwood lands were used for resting and fattening stock, ready for slaughter at the Ashcroft slaughter yards west of the town. The Ashcrofts owned a butchery at the corner of Macquarie and Memorial Avenue. Under the Ashcroft's ownership Collingwood was modified and new features were added including a bull nosed iron roof to the verandah, a gable over the sitting room window, and the enclosing of the back verandah.

=== Liverpool Golf Course ===
When E. J. Ashcroft died 80 hectares (200 acres) of the Collingwood property were leased to Mr Frank Crowe to create the Liverpool Golf Course. Golf was becoming increasingly popular after the First World War. The course designed by Tommy Howard was opened in 1931. A club was formed and Dr R. A. Lovejoy was elected the first president. The club started with a membership of less than 20, but by 1939, there were 92 members and 36 associates. Many prominent Liverpool families became foundation members including the Marsden, Buckland, Clink, Wych, Hamer, Prince, Cornes, Fitzpatrick, Kershler and Webb families. Women were admitted to the course from its inception. Collingwood House was used as the club house. In the mid-1930s, the course was extended from 9 to 18 holes.

The Liverpool Golf Club bought the Collingwood Estate in 1951 and undertook alterations to the house.

A 1964 proposal by the Department of Main Roads to build an expressway through the golf course, led the Board of the Liverpool Golf Club to approve a plan to sell the course and look for an alternative site.

The golf course was sold in 1969 and approval was granted to rezone the land for residential subdivision. A condition of the sale was that Collingwood House and the surrounding land be given to Liverpool City Council for restoration.

The last competitive golf match was played at Collingwood on 18 July 1971.

=== Liverpool City Council ownership ===
In 1973–74, Collingwood House ('Captain Bunker's Cottage') was restored by Heritage Architect Clive Lucas at a cost of $72,148.00. Works included a re-created garden setting (designed by James Broadbent, recognised expert in colonial gardens, from the Historic Houses Trust, in collaboration with Clive Lucas Stapleton & Partners) within a larger, parkland precinct.

At that time everyone including the National Trust of Australia (NSW) thought 'Captain Bunker's Cottage' was the kitchen block. A subdivision had been done to isolate this building. Clive Lucas determined, on close building inspection, that it was the building next door that contained the house built by Eber Bunker in the second decade of the 19th century and not the building earmarked in 1973 for conservation. The kitchen block was later proved to have been built c. 1865, some 30 years after Bunker's death.

The restored Collingwood was officially opened by the Prime Minister of Australia, the Hon Gough Whitlam, M.P., on 6 September 1975. Since 1975 Collingwood House has operated as a house museum under the management of the Liverpool Regional Museum.

The Royal Australian Institute of Architects (NSW Division) awarded the inaugural "Greenway Award" to Collingwood in 1979.

On 3 July 2009, Collingwood Precinct Aboriginal Place was declared under the National Parks & Wildlife Act 1974. National Parks & Wildlife Act 1974 by then Minister for Climate Change and the Environment, Carmel Tebbutt. This recognised the special significance of the Aboriginal Place include the ridge line "high ground" view meeting place for the Dharawal, Gandangara and Dharug people, which was also a vantage point during the pre-contact era enabling country to be observed and monitored. The place is associated with early engagement, and at times conflict, between European settlers and Aboriginal peoples. The "vista" from the high ground provides a corridor southeast to the Georges River across remnant native vegetation and riverine environment.

The house is available for tours by appointment only.

== Description ==
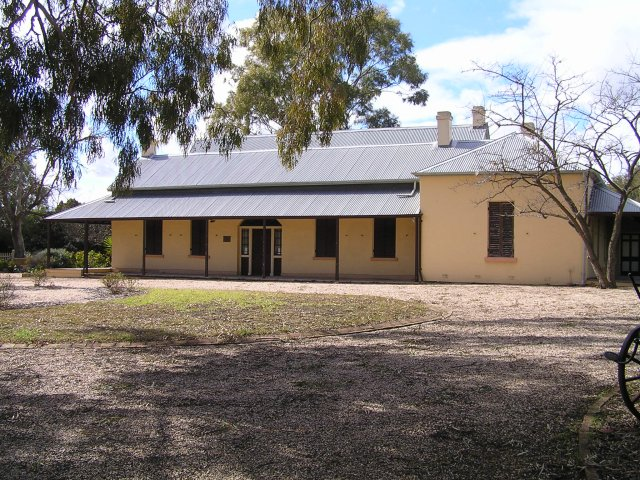
The house

Collingwood House is located on a small block of elevated land that is truncated at the rear (due to residential subdivision) but has some remnant garden and open space to the west. The open space provides vistas of the house from the roadway and retains its historic link with Liverpool Road.

The complex sits in gardens with some mature trees, including very tall and wide lemon-scented gums (Corymbia citriodora), forest red gums (Eucalyptus tereticornis), a younger but mature honey locust (Gleditsia triacanthos), brush box (Lophostemon confertus), white quince (Alectryon subcinereus), coral tree (Erythrina x sykesii), young bunya-bunya pine (Araucaria bidwillii) and pepper(corn) tree (Schinus molle var.areira). Some of these date to a garden restoration undertaken with advice from James Broadbent in the late 1980s.

Collingwood comprises two buildings, the house and the kitchen block.

House (c. 1820s)

A "conglomerate" single storey house with two attic rooms and a hipped roof verandah to three elevations, encircling verandah and single storey detached service wing. The original five bay house (originally hipped roof), built by Captain Bunker, forms the front section of the present complex.

It features Colonial/Georgian character fanlights and sidelights around the main door.

The house was added to about 1860 with a gabled section, giving an early Victorian quality.

Kitchen Block (c. 1865)

The service block appears to have been rebuilt about 1865.

=== Modifications and dates ===
- c. 1811 – The oldest section of the house may date somewhere between 1810 and 1812. The exact year of construction is a source of much conjecture, and further research is required to clarify the construction date. The earliest section of the house appears to exemplify Governor Macquarie's strict building controls introduced by decree on 26 December 1810. It was built of brick with a shingled roof. There were two rooms with two windows in each, and a hall between them. The 12 foot high ceilings exceeded Macquarie's rule of 10 foot. The house was symmetrical with a brick chimney. The building features are thought to be typical of the early colonial Georgian period – it has a simple rectangular shape, symmetrical facade, six panelled door, a chair rail around the wall, and entrance doorway with sidelights and semi circular fanlight. The fabric of the walls was made of sandstock brick (made by convicts from local clay). The house was later extended to seven rooms.
- 1840s – Substantial improvements were made to the estate by George Blackett including a flour mill (the Collingwood Flour Mill) near the Georges River.
- 1845 – It is thought that another room was added by George Blackett to the south western corner of the house prior to 1845.
- 1856 – Due to the proximity of the Collingwood Estate to the new railway linking Parramatta and Liverpool new industries were developed around and on the estate. James Henry Atkinson developed the Collingwood Estate as a depot for the transfer of pastoral and agricultural produce. He built a private railway siding, large railway store, an abattoir, stock and sale yards, a wool wash, Fellmongery and paper mill. Atkinson also built a series of terrace like workers cottages in Nagle Street (then Collingwood Street).
- 1857 – Collingwood House was renovated by the architect William Weaver. A second storey and verandahs were added, and a new kitchen block built.
- 1859 – The Collingwood Estate was subdivided by James Henry Atkinson.
- 1864–68 – The Australian Paper Company built a large paper mill on land on the river banks between Collingwood House and Atkinson Street.
- 1910 – Alterations were made to the house during the Ashcroft family's ownership. These included the addition of a bull nosed iron roof to the veranda, a gable over the sitting room window, and the enclosing of the back verandah.
- 1951 – Alterations were made to the house including an extension to the southern side of the house during the ownership of the Liverpool Golf Course. The house was used as the Club House.
- 1969 – The Liverpool Golf Course was sold and the land subdivided for houses.
- 1973/4 – Collingwood House was restored by Heritage Architect Clive Lucas at a cost of $72,148.00. Works included re-instated garden designed by James Broadbent in collaboration with Clive Lucas, Stapelton & Partners.
- 1982-4: Some restoration carried out by Bill Cummings, such as laying of plush red carpet throughout the house.
- 1989–2001 Roach family era: the verandah was paved with sandstone block, but these needed to be replaced due to subsistence. The verandah was resurfaced in tiles, which are present today on several surfaces throughout the property. The bathrooms were all gutted at this time with none of the original fabric kept. The massive bathtub was removed. Around this time the courtyard at the rear of the house was concreted.
- c. 2002: restoration work undertaken by the Munros, including covering the chimneys and repairing the roof as birds had overrun the house. A rising damp problem in the dining room was repaired due to the previous owners concreting the courtyard and covering essential vents. Other work that may have been carried out by the Munros includes installation of the existing entrance gate and fence, and polishing the floorboards under the carpets on the staircase and bedrooms.

== Heritage listing ==
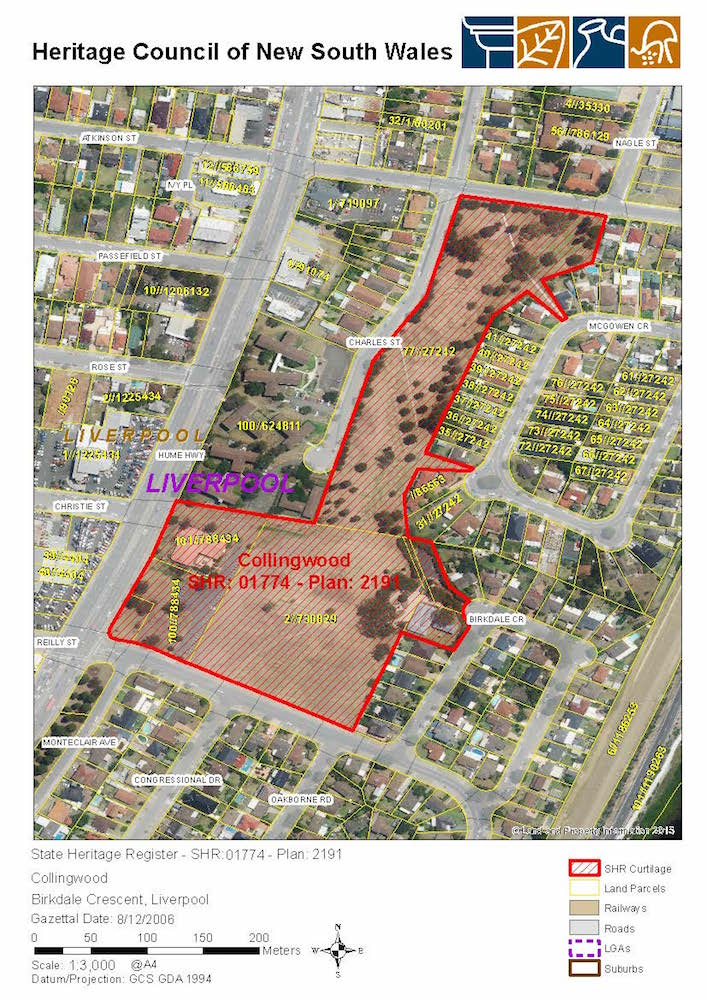
Heritage boundaries

Collingwood House Estate is of State significance as a remnant cultural landscape demonstrating the layers of Indigenous and non Indigenous use and occupation and the significant transition of the place from an agricultural estate to an industrial estate during the nineteenth century.

The high point of the ridgeline at Collingwood is of historic and contemporary social significance to the Tharawal and the Gundungurra peoples as a meeting place for the two Aboriginal nations, from which each respective nation could remain within sight of their country.

The estate originally known as Bunker's Farm is associated with the early economic development of Liverpool, which was established as a town by Governor Macquarie in 1810. One of the earliest and largest land grants in the Liverpool region, Bunker's Farm played an important role in the development of agriculture and early industries in the colony. The location of the farm in relation to the Georges River and the railway which arrived from Parramatta in 1856 encouraged commercial speculation, and the development of new industries on the estate lands.

The place is significantly associated with its original builder the American Loyalist, mariner and trader Captain Eber Bunker (1761–1836). Captain Bunker who arrived in Port Jackson in 1791, as Master of the Third Fleet convict ship the "William and Anne", is regarded as the founder of the Australian whaling industry, and is also credited with being one of the colony's first exporters and traders. Bunker assisted in establishing the British settlement on the Derwent River in Van Diemen's Land in 1803, and also chartered part of the far northern NSW coast (now Queensland), the Bunker Islands off Gladstone and also part of the South Island of New Zealand. Bunker built his house around c.1810 on an estate at Liverpool granted to him between 1804 and 1810 by Governors King and Macquarie.

The Collingwood Estate was owned and/or occupied by several important colonial figures prominent in the fields of agriculture, commerce and law, including: Samuel Dean Gordon; James Henry Atkinson; and Sir Saul Samuel.

Samuel Dean Gordon who owned the estate in the mid-1840s was a successful merchant and pastoralist. He was elected to the Legislative Assembly in 1856 and to the Legislative Council in 1861. James Henry Atkinson, who owned the estate from the 1850s was a wool merchant, entrepreneur and politician. Atkinson was a Member of the Legislative Assembly for Central Cumberland from 1858 until 1863. Atkinson speculated and capitalised on the arrival of the railway, developing the Collingwood Estate as a depot for the transfer of pastoral and agricultural produce. Atkinson developed Collingwood as an industrial estate based on the English mill-town model. Sir Saul Samuel (1820–1900) who owned the estate from the late 1860s until the turn of the century was a businessman and member of both houses of Parliament between 1854 and 1880. Samuel was the first Jewish Magistrate, Parliamentarian and Minister of the Crown in NSW. Samuel was knighted in 1880 and appointed Agent-General in London. Samuel expanded the Collingwood Industrial area. He developed the most advanced wool washing processes in Australia and invented a machine for removing burrs from fleece.

The house complex is a rare example of modified colonial Georgian residence that demonstrates the evolution of domestic colonial architecture and its adaptation to the Australian environment from the earliest stage of the Macquarie period (1810–21) to the 1860s. It is one of only a small number of houses that remain from the Macquarie period, and one of the earliest examples conforming to the strict building code relating to materials, form, dimensions and siting decreed by Governor Macquarie on 26 December 1810. The fabric of the house exhibits a range of early building techniques that are found few other houses in New South Wales. The evolution of the house in terms of its fabric, dimensions and layout, is illustrative of the social and economic standing of its owners within the colony, their resources, and the genteel lifestyle to which they aspired.

Collingwood was listed on the New South Wales State Heritage Register on 8 December 2006.
