= Liverpool, New South Wales =

Suburb of Sydney, Australia

Liverpool
- Suburb
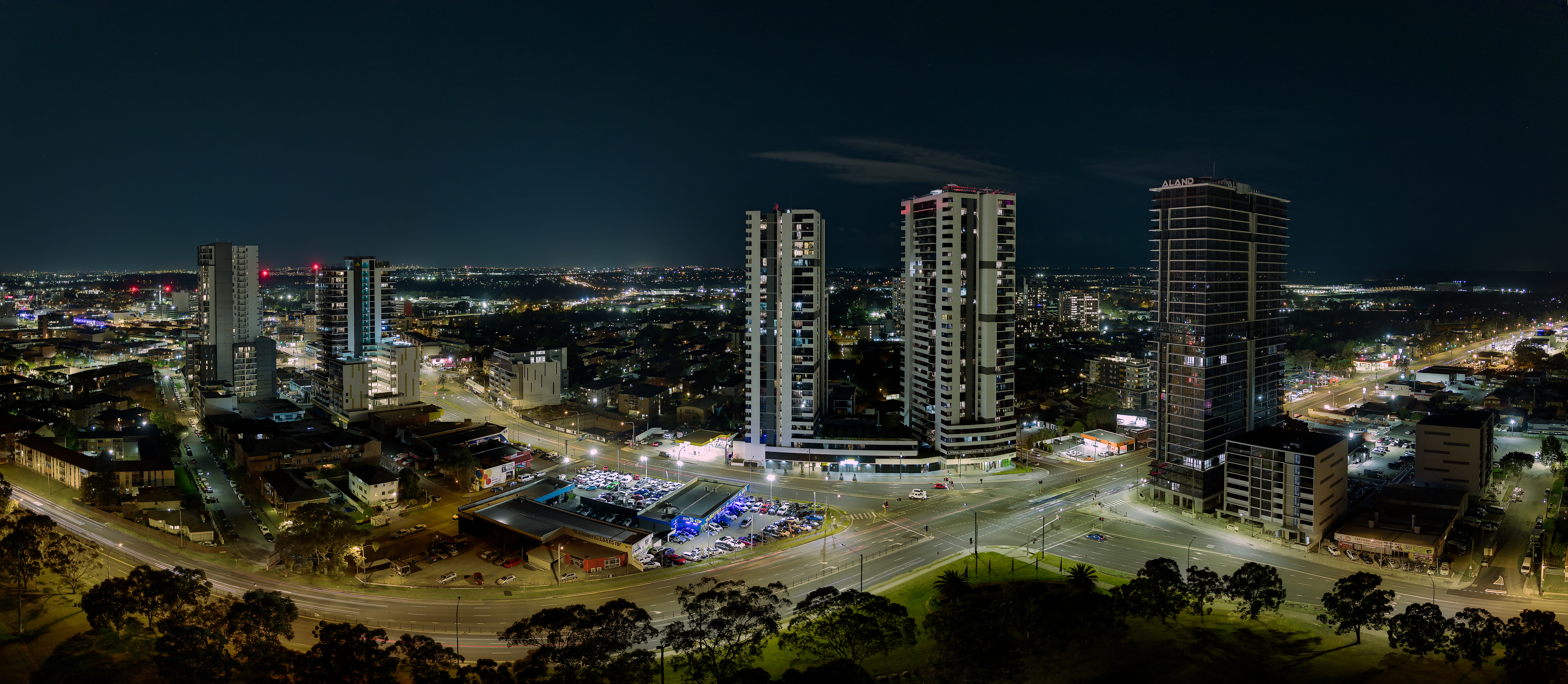
- The skyline of Liverpool at night

- Interactive map of Liverpool
- Country: Australia
- State: New South Wales
- City: Sydney
- LGA: City of Liverpool
- Location: 40 km (25 mi) south-west of Sydney CBD
- Established: 1810

Government
  - State electorates: Holsworthy; Liverpool
  - Federal division: Fowler

Area
  - Total: 6.3 km^{2} (2.4 sq mi)
- Elevation: 29 m (95 ft)

Population
  - Total: 31,078 (2021 census)
  - Density: 4,930/km^{2} (12,780/sq mi)
- Postcode: 2170
Suburbs around Liverpool
Ashcroft	Mount Pritchard	Chipping Norton
Cartwright	Liverpool	Warwick Farm
Lurnea	Casula	Moorebank

Liverpool is a suburb in South Western Sydney, New South Wales, Australia. It is located 40 kilometres (25 mi) south-west of the Sydney central business district on the western bank of the Georges River. Liverpool is the administrative centre for the City of Liverpool local government area.

== History ==
=== Indigenous ===
Before British colonisation, Liverpool was the country of the Cabrogal people of the Dharug nation. The term "cabro" (also pronounced "cobra" or "cabra") refers to the edible insect larvae found in timber around the region. The country of the Cabrogal clan extended from the areas of what is now Cabramatta and Liverpool, east to the mouth of the Georges River.

The Gandangara Local Aboriginal Land Council, established under the Aboriginal Land Rights Act 1983, is based in Liverpool and covers much of south-western Sydney.

=== British colonisation ===
Liverpool is one of the oldest urban settlements in Australia, founded on 7 November 1810 as an agricultural centre by Governor Lachlan Macquarie. He named it after Robert Banks Jenkinson, Earl of Liverpool, who was then the Secretary of State for the Colonies and the English city of Liverpool, upon which some of the area's architecture is based.

The post office opened at Liverpool on 1 March 1825 – one of the first post offices to be opened in New South Wales. Liverpool was one of the six stations on the first line of telegraphs to be constructed in this colony.

On 26 January 1858, a telegraph office was opened at the railway station. Later, on 12 July 1878, these two offices were amalgamated and plans proposed to construct a joint office.

Finally, a foundation stone was laid prior to construction starting. Mrs. N. G. Bull of Cabramatta had the honour of laying the stone – such a responsibility given to a woman bringing great indignation by the mayor and several of the leading men. An Indignation meeting held soon after confirmed unanimously that Bull was "a fit and proper person" to have laid the stone.

Urban sprawl of Sydney across the Cumberland Plain soon reached Liverpool, and it became an outer suburb of metropolitan Sydney with a strong working-class presence and manufacturing facilities. The Liverpool area also became renowned for its vast Housing Commission estates housing thousands of low-income families after the slum clearance and urban renewal programs in inner-city Sydney in the 1960s.

== Culture ==
=== Commercial area ===
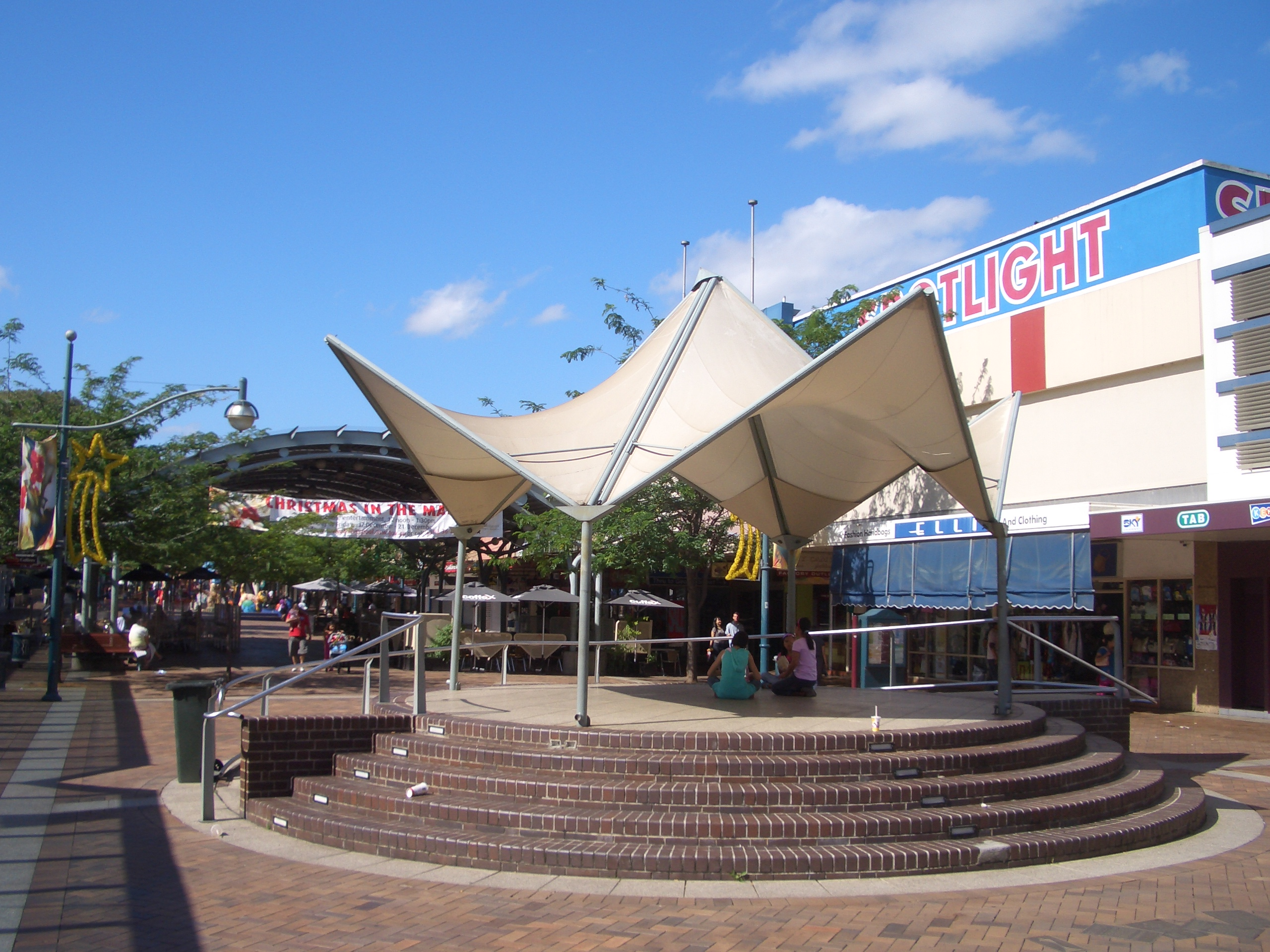
Macquarie Street Mall

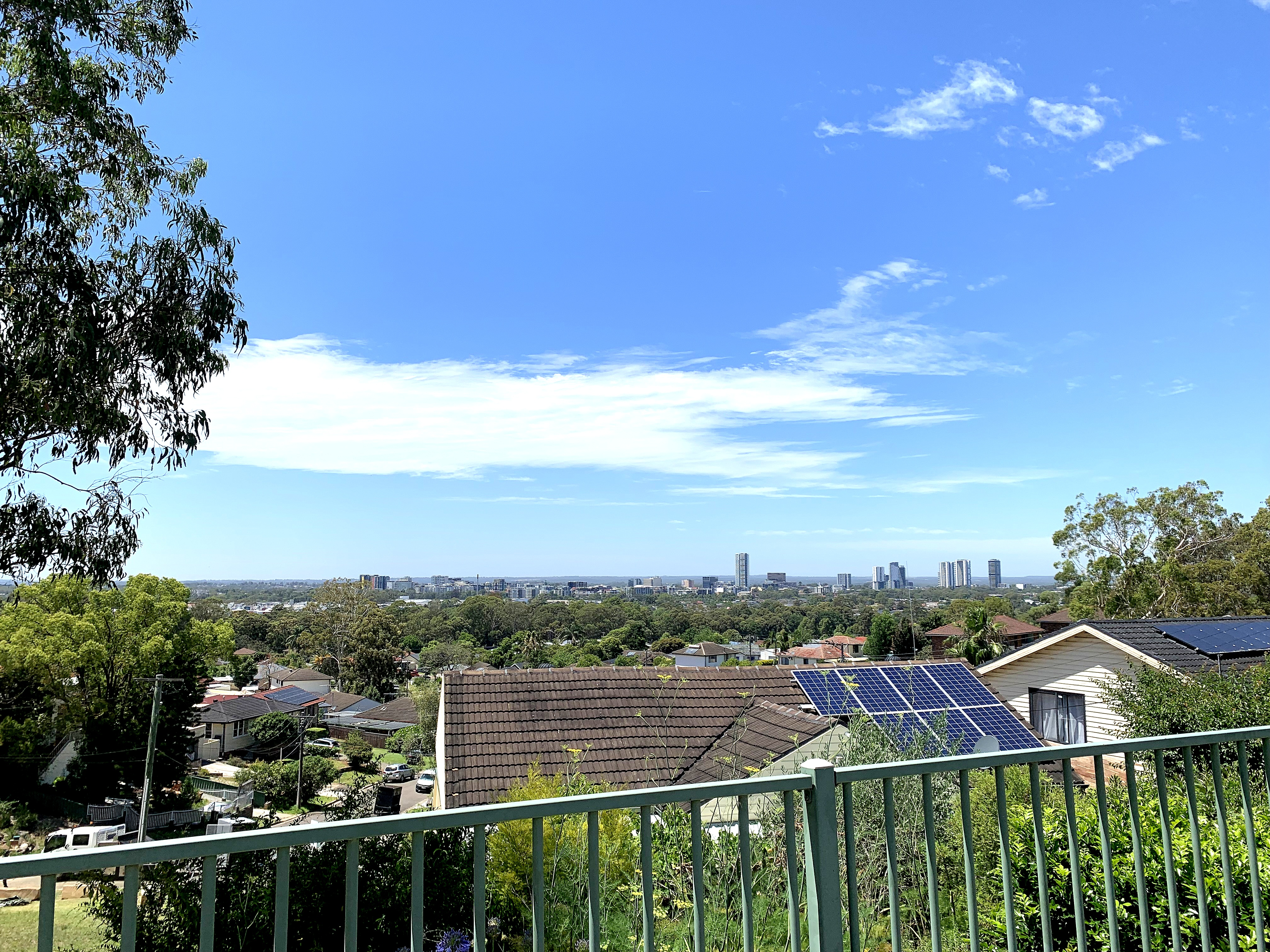
Skyline of Liverpool viewed from Mount Pritchard

The central retail strip is Macquarie Street, which contains numerous small cafes. In recent times the extension of the Westfield shopping centre has seen many new fashion stores come in. The central business district is being touted as Sydney's third CBD centred around the Western Sydney Airport and aerotropolis. The CBD was rezoned for mixed use in 2018 to allow for more homes, offices and shops. The main shopping area is centred on Macquarie Street, with Westfield Liverpool, a major shopping centre at the northern end. Liverpool Plaza is a shopping mall located between Macquarie Mall and Northumberland Street. The private hospital operator Healthscope owns the Sydney Southwest Private Hospital in Liverpool.

=== Heritage listings ===
Liverpool has a number of heritage-listed sites, including:

- 251 Bigge Street: Liverpool Courthouse
- Birkdale Crescent: Collingwood
- College Street: Old Liverpool Hospital
- Elizabeth Drive: St Luke's Anglican Church
- Georges River, Heathcote Road near Newbridge Road: Liverpool Weir
- Great Southern railway: Liverpool railway station
- 17 Speed Street: Rosebank

=== Schools ===
There are three public primary schools within the suburb of Liverpool: Liverpool Public School, Liverpool West and Marsden Road. Liverpool Boys and Liverpool Girls are the two public secondary schools. The Mainsbridge School caters to children with intellectual disabilities and Liverpool Hospital School for children hospitalized for lengthy periods.

Private schools include All Saints Primary School, All Saints Catholic College and Al Amanah College.

Post secondary education is catered to with the South Western College of TAFE, Macarthur Community College, Liverpool U3A: School for Seniors, University of Western Sydney English Language Centre, School of Arts in Macquarie Street, and the University of Wollongong.

=== Media ===
Liverpool has an arts and creation centre, which provides music lessons with instruments such as:guitar, drums and banjo etc.

Liverpool is currently served by a full-time radio station 89.3FM 2GLF, which broadcasts local information, music and ethnic programming. It is one of the first FM radio stations setup in the early 1980s.

Liverpool has had several newspapers since the late 1800s. The first newspaper appeared in Liverpool in 1886 was The Liverpool Times, which was soon superseded by The Liverpool Mercury. Both of these newspapers were then incorporated with The Liverpool Herald. There was also the free newspaper The Liverpool News that ran from 1904 to about 1973. Liverpool now has two newspapers, The Liverpool Leader and The Liverpool Champion published every Wednesday.

=== Places of worship ===
St Luke's Anglican Church, located in the city centre across the road from Westfield Liverpool, is the oldest existing Anglican church in Australia. All Saints Catholic Church in George St is located with the All Saints schools. St Raphael, Nickolas and Irene Greek Orthodox Church is in Forbes Street and the Serbian Orthodox Church of the Apostle Luke is on Flowerdale Rd.

Ganzibra Dakhil Mandi is a Mandaean temple located in the city centre of Liverpool, and is the largest of its kind in Australia. It is led by Salah Choheili.

== Transport ==
Liverpool is well served by roads such as the Hume Highway (also known as Liverpool Road), the M5 Motorway, and the Westlink M7 Motorway.

Liverpool railway station is on the Main Southern railway line. Liverpool has services to the Sydney CBD, Leppington, Parramatta and Schofields. The Liverpool to Parramatta transitway provides a bus-only route for buses.

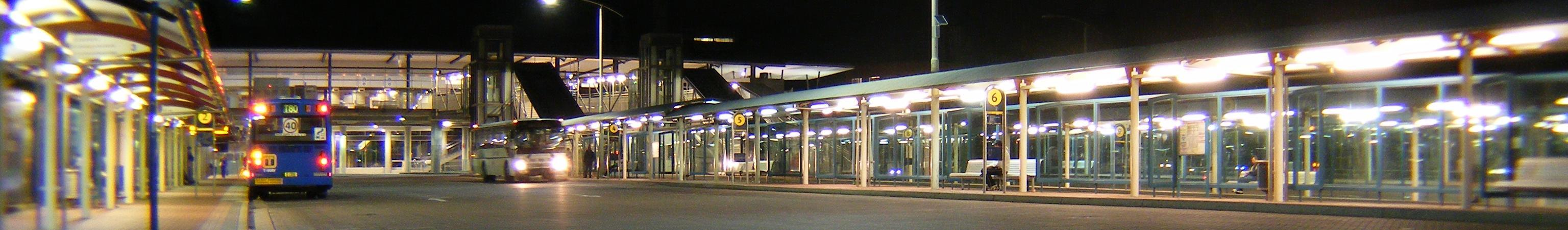
Liverpool transit terminal

== Sport and recreation ==
=== Parks ===
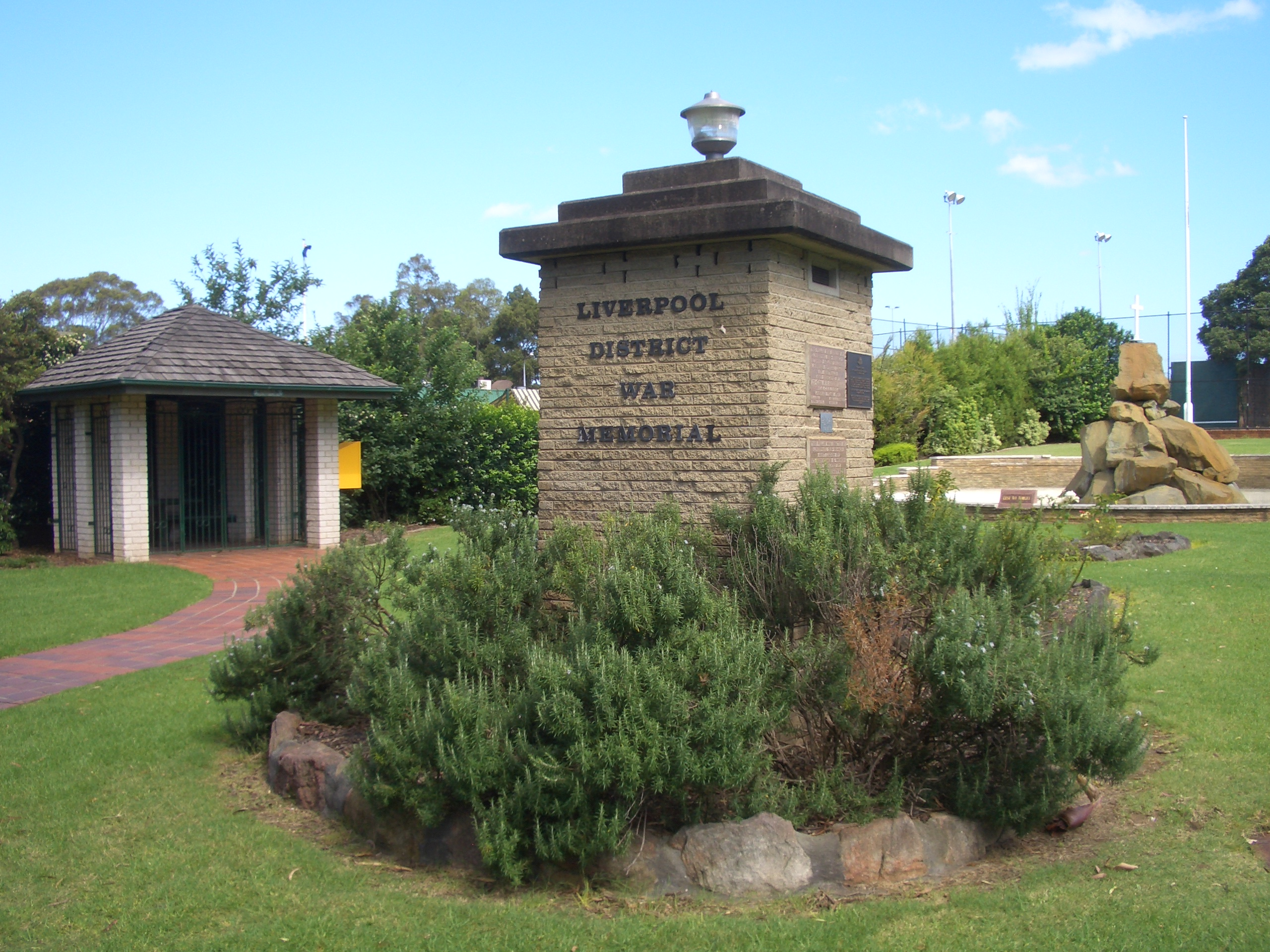
Bigge Park

There are many open spaces within the city centre, including botanical parks and sporting facilities. Bigge Park on the east side of the city features a war mMemorial while Pioneer Memorial Park to the north has a historical cemetery. Woodward Park to the west is the main sporting precinct containing a number of outdoor playing fields and the Whitlam Leisure Centre, hosting a swimming pool and a 3000-seat indoor sports stadium. Other notable sports facilities within the suburb of Liverpool include Collimore Park (netball) and Paciullo Park (soccer and touch football).

=== Sporting teams ===
Prominent local teams include Fairfield-Liverpool Cricket Club, which plays in the Sydney Grade Cricket competition, Liverpool City Netball, which has participated successfully in many state and representative competitions, Hinchinbrook Hornets Junior Rugby League and FC Bossy Liverpool, which plays in the New South Wales Super League and Liverpool Rangers FC, which is located at Ireland Park, Memorial Avenue. The West Sydney Razorbacks basketball team used to play out of the Gough Whitlam Centre while they were in the NBL. Liverpool is also home to Australian Ice Hockey League team the Sydney Ice Dogs, who play out of the Liverpool Catholic Club Ice Rink and Liverpool little athletics.

== Demographics ==
According to the 2021 census conducted by the Australian Bureau of Statistics, Liverpool had a population of 31,078. These came from a wide variety of ethnic backgrounds; approximately one-third (33.9%) of residents were born in Australia. The next most common countries of birth were Iraq (11.3%), India (4.9%), Vietnam (3.1%), Fiji (2.7%), and Philippines (2.2%). The most popular ethnic responses were Australian (9.4%), Iraqi (8.3%), English (8.3%), Serbian (6.9%), and Indian (6.8%).

24.6% of people only spoke English at home. Other languages spoken at home included Arabic 19.2%, Serbian 6.5%, Vietnamese 4.4%, Hindi 3.2%, and Urdu 2.4%.

Liverpool is remarkable for the high proportion of people who reported following some religion in the Census; only 12.1% stated that they had no religion, much lower than the national average of 38.4%. This Census question is optional and 10.9% of residents did not respond to it, which introduces some uncertainty into all the religious figures. The most common responses for religion were Islam 16.4%, Catholic 16.2%, and "miscellaneous religions" 9.2%.

In 2015, Liverpool was the Sydney suburb with the highest number of registered firearms, with 4,689 held by 1,732 residents.

== Politics ==
The suburb of Liverpool is split in its representation at all three levels of government with Hoxton Park Road the divider in each case. At the local level, Liverpool is part of the City of Liverpool, which is divided into two wards, the North Ward on the north side of Hoxton Park Road and the South Ward on the other side. Each ward elects five councillors and the council currently consists of four Labor councillors, four Liberals, two members of the Liverpool Community Independents Team. There is also a directly elected mayor, Ned Mannoun.

For New South Wales state elections, the north side of Liverpool is located in the electoral district of Liverpool, held by Charishma Kaliyanda, while the south side is in the electoral district of Holsworthy, held by Tina Ayyad. Kaliyanda is a member of the Labor Party while Ayyad is a member of the Liberal Party. Federally, the north side of Liverpool is located in the Division of Hughes held by David Moncrieff of the Labor Party. The south side is part of the Division of Werriwa, held by Labor's Anne Stanley.

== Geography ==
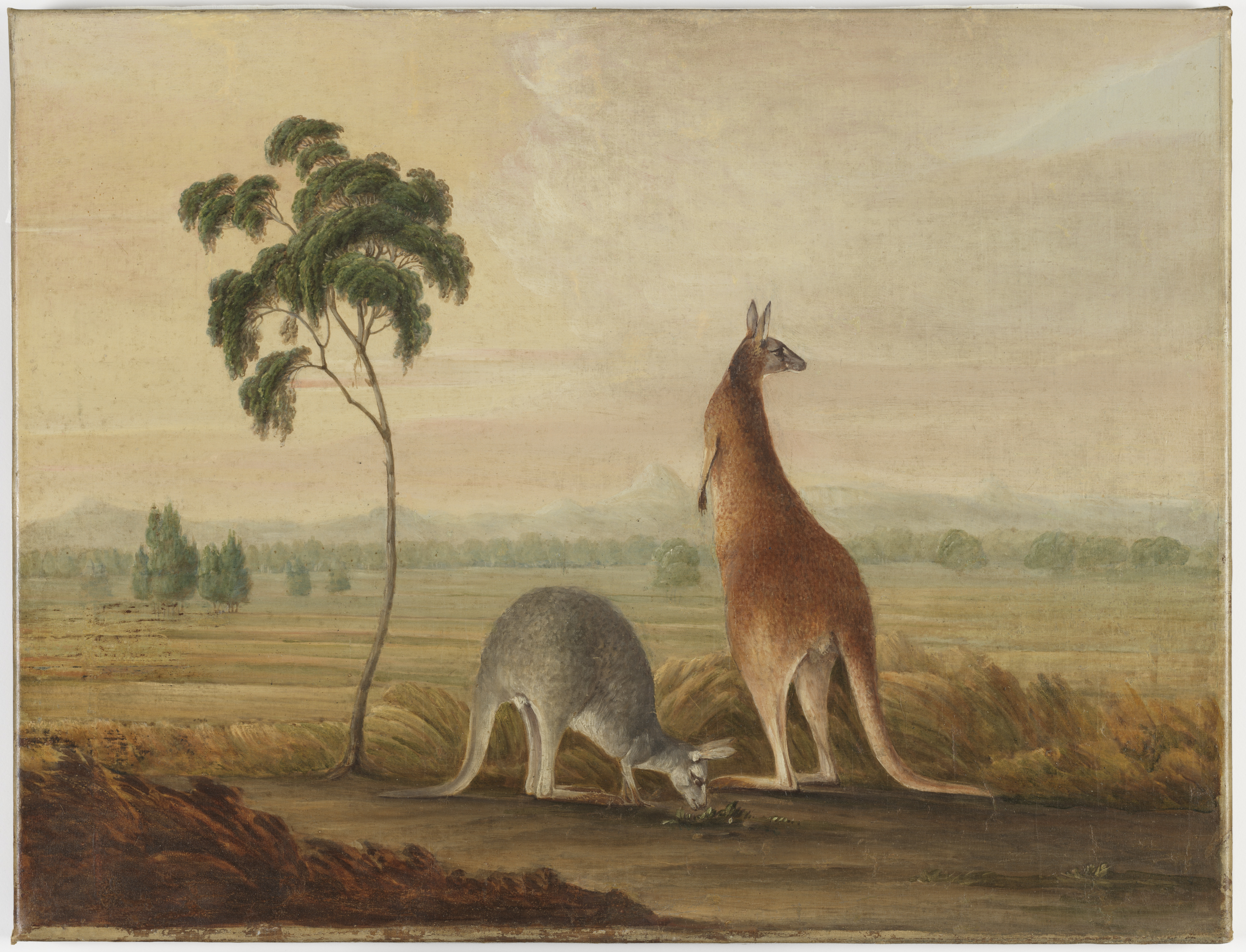
Liverpool plains, circa 1819

The Cooks River/Castlereagh Ironbark ecological community and Cumberland Plain Woodland are the indigenous flora community of the area, which are found in remnants within the suburb.

=== Climate ===
Liverpool has a humid subtropical climate (Köppen climate classification: Cfa) and is a few degrees warmer than the Sydney CBD at daytime, although nights are slightly cooler than Sydney's. If the maximum temperature is 27 °C in the city, in Liverpool it could typically reach as high as 33 °C, while in winter the temperature can be close to 0 °C while it is above 7 °C in central Sydney.

The hottest day recorded in Liverpool was on 1 February 1977 when it reached 45.8 °C. At the time this was the second highest temperature recorded in Sydney's metropolitan area, being 2 °C below Richmond's record set in 1939.

Rainfall is somewhat spread throughout the months, although the first half tends to be wetter. July to September tend to be drier, due to foehn winds originating from the Great Dividing Range. Frost can occur in the winter; the lowest recorded temperature was –5 °C, on 25 July 1994.

Climate data for Liverpool, New South Wales, 1962-2014
Month	Jan	Feb	Mar	Apr	May	Jun	Jul	Aug	Sep	Oct	Nov	Dec	Year
Record high °C (°F)	45.6 (114.1)	45.8 (114.4)	41.0 (105.8)	37.1 (98.8)	29.6 (85.3)	25.9 (78.6)	26.8 (80.2)	30.5 (86.9)	35.4 (95.7)	39.8 (103.6)	43.3 (109.9)	43.5 (110.3)	45.8 (114.4)
Mean daily maximum °C (°F)	29.7 (85.5)	28.7 (83.7)	27.2 (81.0)	24.2 (75.6)	21.2 (70.2)	18.4 (65.1)	17.9 (64.2)	19.9 (67.8)	23.3 (73.9)	24.9 (76.8)	26.6 (79.9)	28.2 (82.8)	24.2 (75.5)
Mean daily minimum °C (°F)	17.7 (63.9)	17.8 (64.0)	15.2 (59.4)	12.0 (53.6)	8.0 (46.4)	5.9 (42.6)	4.2 (39.6)	4.8 (40.6)	8.3 (46.9)	10.8 (51.4)	14.4 (57.9)	16.1 (61.0)	11.3 (52.3)
Record low °C (°F)	7.8 (46.0)	9.4 (48.9)	5.0 (41.0)	1.6 (34.9)	−1.5 (29.3)	−2.4 (27.7)	−5.0 (23.0)	−3.0 (26.6)	−1.8 (28.8)	3.3 (37.9)	4.7 (40.5)	7.8 (46.0)	−5.0 (23.0)
Average precipitation mm (inches)	52.6 (2.07)	153.6 (6.05)	65.7 (2.59)	59.6 (2.35)	53.9 (2.12)	76.3 (3.00)	34.8 (1.37)	22.4 (0.88)	35.6 (1.40)	54.0 (2.13)	74.6 (2.94)	65.9 (2.59)	749 (29.49)
Average precipitation days (≥ 1 mm)	7.2	9.1	7.6	7.1	5.7	7.1	6.1	3.4	4.4	6.6	8.2	7.7	80.2
Source 1: Liverpool (Whitlam Centre)
Source 2: Liverpool (Michael Wenden Centre)

== Notable people ==
- Mark Bosnich, former footballer
- Leslie Camilleri, convicted criminal with 3x life imprisonment charges
- Michael Clarke, cricketer
- Sir Jenkin Coles, auctioneer and politician
- Walter Hampson Cooper, journalist, playwright, politician and barrister
- Isaac De Gois, rugby league player
- Mitchell Duke, soccer player
- Michael Dwyer, Irish Rebellion Leader (1798–1803) and Chief of Police Liverpool (1813–1820)
- Nathan Foley, former member of Hi-5, entertainer
- Frederick Augustus Forbes, store-keeper, grazier and politician
- Scott Gardiner, first golfer of Aboriginal descent to play on the PGA Tour
- Liam Hatcher, cricketer
- Vic Hey, rugby league player
- Brett Hodgson, rugby league player
- Harry Kewell, soccer player
- Craig Knowles, politician
- Terry Lamb, rugby league player
- Anthony Minichiello, rugby league player
- Mark Minichiello, rugby league player
- Brad Morrin, rugby league player
- Pat Richards, rugby league player
- Richard Sadleir (1794–1889), first mayor of Liverpool (in 1872)
- Lenny Zappavigna, boxer
