= Megalong, New South Wales =

Coordinates: 33°44′S 150°15′E

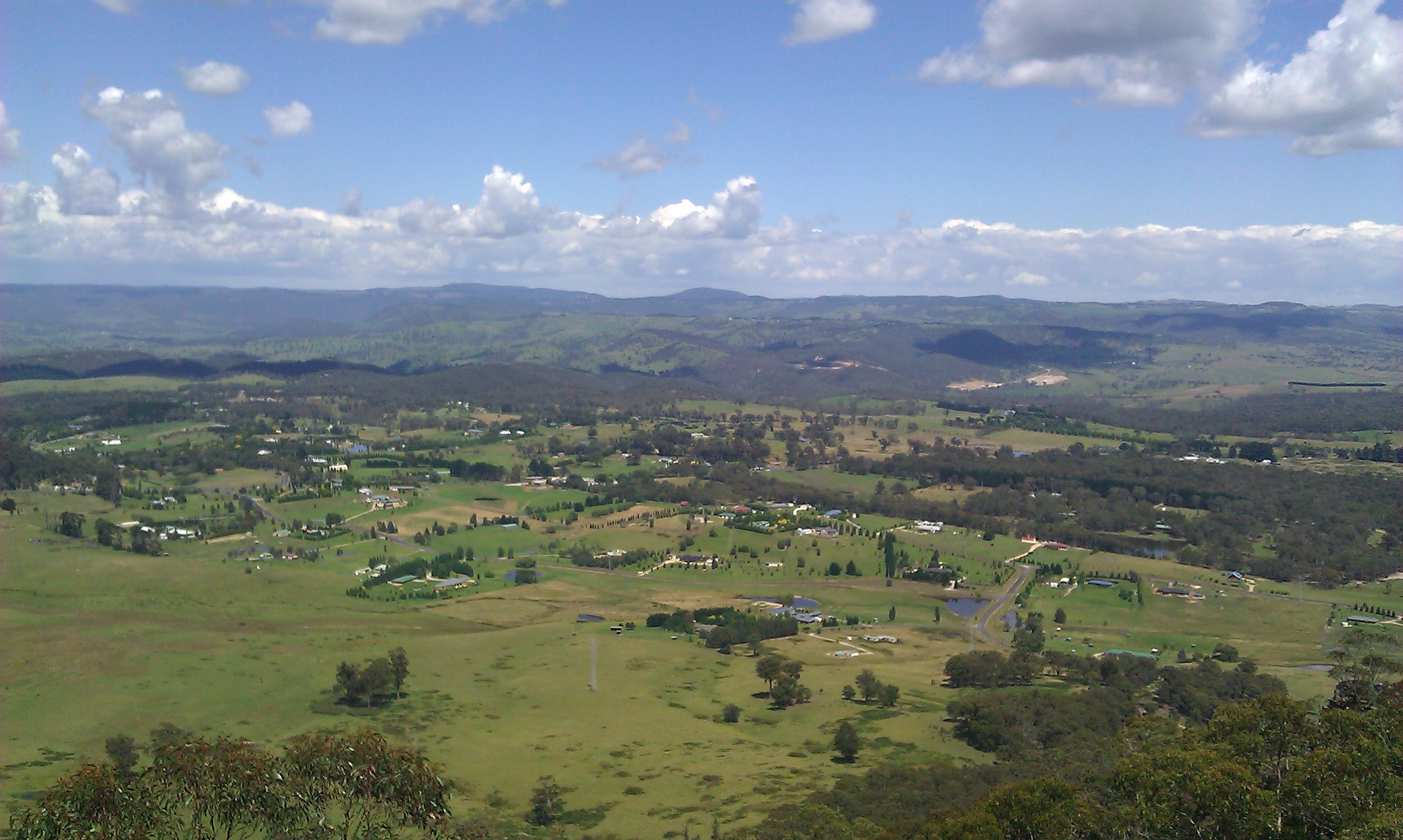

Megalong is a small rural community in the Megalong Valley in the state of New South Wales, Australia in the City of Blue Mountains. At the 2006 census, Megalong had a population of 164 people.

The community is mainly quiet rural properties surrounded by the spectacular scenery of the Blue Mountains escarpment. Attractions of the area are bushwalking and horse riding.
