= 2017 IQA European Games =

European Games
- 2017

Tournament information
- Sport: Quidditch
- Location: Oslo, Norway
- Dates: 7–9 July 2017
- Administrator: International Quidditch Association; Quidditch Europe
- Tournament format(s): Pool play Single elimination bracket
- Host(s): Norges Rumpeldunkforbund; OSI Vikings
- Venue(s): Haraløkka Sports Complex
- Teams: 15

The 2017 IQA European Games were the second European championship for the sport of quidditch. The tournament was held on 7–9 July 2017 in Oslo, Norway and was hosted by the Norges Rumpeldunkforbund and local club OSI Vikings. All European IQA member nations in good standing were allowed to compete. The winner of the tournament was the United Kingdom, who defeated the defending champion France 90*-70 in the final. France subsequently took the silver medal and Norway won the bronze, after defeating Belgium 140*-80. This tournament marked the United Kingdom's first international gold medal at quidditch.

== Competing teams ==
The following 15 teams have registered to compete:

Winner Runner-up Third place Participant

| Team | Previous appearances in tournament (Note: Bold: winner, Italics: host. Odd years are European Games, even years are World Cups.) |
|---|---|
| Austria | 1 (2016) |
| Belgium | 3 (2014, 2015, 2016) |
| Catalonia | 2 (2015, 2016) |
| France | 4 (2012, 2014, 2015, 2016) |
| Germany | 2 (2015, 2016) |
| Ireland | 2 (2015, 2016) |
| Italy | 2 (2015, 2016) |
| Netherlands | 2 (2015, 2016) |
| Norway (host) | 2 (2015, 2016) |
| Poland | 2 (2015, 2016) |
| Slovakia | 1 (2016) |
| Spain | 2 (2015, 2016) |
| Sweden | 0 |
| Turkey | 2 (2015, 2016) |
| United Kingdom | 4 (2012, 2014, 2015, 2016) |

== Structure ==
The tournament followed the usual two stage format with a group stage on Day One and a bracket on Day Two. The 15 participating teams were divided into three five-member stacked groups according to their previous World Cup standing, with Group A comprising the five highest-ranked teams and Group C the five lowest-ranked teams. Following the group stage, all teams within each group were seeded according to their performance and moved on to the bracket.

Group A
| Team | 2016 Rank |
|---|---|
| United Kingdom | 3rd place, bronze medalist(s) |
| France | 5 |
| Turkey | 6 |
| Belgium | 7 |
| Norway | 9 |

Group B
| Team | 2016 Rank |
|---|---|
| Spain | 10 |
| Germany | 11 |
| Catalonia | 12 |
| Italy | 13 |
| Austria | 14 |

Group C
| Team | 2016 Rank |
|---|---|
| Slovakia | 17 |
| Netherlands | 18 |
| Poland | 19 |
| Ireland | 20 |
| Sweden | — |

== Results ==
=== Group stage ===
==== Group A ====
| Seed | Team | W | L | PD (Note: 120 cap) |
|---|---|---|---|---|
| 1 | United Kingdom | 3 | 1 | 170 |
| 2 | France | 3 | 1 | 90 |
| 3 | Belgium | 2 | 2 | 0 |
| 4 | Norway | 1 | 3 | −80 |
| 5 | Turkey | 1 | 3 | −180 |

| United Kingdom | 70* | – | 60 | Norway |

| France | 100* | – | 60 | Turkey |

| United Kingdom | 80* | – | 20 | France |

| Turkey | 150* | – | 120 | Belgium |

| Turkey | 80 | – | 140* | Norway |

| France | 140* | – | 130 | Belgium |

| Belgium | 80* | – | 50 | Norway |

| United Kingdom | 140* | – | 30 | Turkey |

| United Kingdom | 70 | – | 80* | Belgium |

| France | 150* | – | 50 | Norway |

==== Group B ====
| Seed | Team | W | L | PD |
|---|---|---|---|---|
| 6 | Germany | 3 | 1 | 270 |
| 7 | Spain | 3 | 1 | 70 |
| 8 | Austria | 3 | 1 | 20 |
| 9 | Catalonia | 1 | 3 | −160 |
| 10 | Italy | 0 | 4 | −200 |

| Germany | 100* | – | 40 | Catalonia |

| Spain | 130* | – | 90 | Italy |

| Spain | 180* | – | 110 | Catalonia |

| Italy | 50 | – | 80* | Austria |

| Spain | 20 | – | 120* | Germany |

| Catalonia | 50 | – | 90* | Austria |

| Catalonia | 130** | – | 120°° | Italy |

| Germany | 90 | – | 100* | Austria |

| Spain | 110* | – | 50 | Austria |

| Germany | 170* | – | 40 | Italy |

==== Group C ====
| Seed | Team | W | L | PD |
|---|---|---|---|---|
| 11 | Poland | 3 | 1 | 200 |
| 12 | Slovakia | 3 | 1 | 150 |
| 13 | Netherlands | 3 | 1 | 140 |
| 14 | Ireland | 1 | 3 | −120 |
| 15 | Sweden | 0 | 4 | −370 |

| Netherlands | 100* | – | 40 | Ireland |

| Poland | 70* | – | 40 | Slovakia |

| Slovakia | 120 | – | 50* | Sweden |

| Poland | 200* | – | 140 | Ireland |

| Poland | 80 | – | 90* | Netherlands |

| Ireland | 120 | – | 60* | Sweden |

| Ireland | 60 | – | 120* | Slovakia |

| Netherlands | 210 | – | 50* | Sweden |

| Netherlands | 60 | – | 110* | Slovakia |

| Poland | 260* | – | 30 | Sweden |

=== Bracket ===
Round of 16
Match 5
Austria | 100*
Catalonia | 40
Match 6
Norway | 190
Netherlands | 60*
Match 7
Turkey | 160*
Slovakia | 20
Match 1
France | 290*
Sweden | 10
Match 2
Spain | 100
Italy | 110*
Match 3
Belgium | 200*
Ireland | 10
Match 4
Germany | 180*
Poland | 30

Quarter-finals
Match 12
United Kingdom | 140
Austria | 30*
Match 13
Norway | 190*
Turkey | 120
Match 8
France | 280*
Italy | 40
Match 9
Belgium | 120*
Germany | 50

Semi-finals
Match 19
United Kingdom | 110*
Norway | 40
Match 15
France | 80*
Belgium | 50

Final
Match 28
United Kingdom | 90*
France | 70
Third place
Match 26
Norway | 140*
Belgium | 80

==== Quarter-final consolation ====
First round
Match 20
Austria | 20
Turkey | 140*
Match 16
Italy | 20
Germany | 120*

Fifth place
Match 27
Turkey | 120°°
Germany | 130*°
Seventh place
Match 22
Austria | 110*
Italy | 70

==== Round of 16 consolation ====
First round
Match 14
Netherlands | 80
Slovakia | 100*
Match 10
Sweden | 30*
Spain | 170
Match 11
Ireland | 90*
Poland | 130*

Second round
Match 21
Catalonia | 100*
Slovakia | 30
Match 17
Spain | 210*
Poland | 50

Ninth place
Match 23
Catalonia | 50
Spain | 90*
Eleventh place
Match 24
Slovakia | 50
Poland | 120*

Second round
Match 18
Sweden | 70*
Ireland | 130

Thirteenth place
Match 25
Netherlands | 160*
Ireland | 60
