= 2018 IQA World Cup =

Fourth edition of the IQA World Cup

IQA World Cup
- 2018

Tournament information
- Sport: Quidditch
- Location: Florence, Italy
- Dates: 27 June–2 July 2018
- Administrator: International Quidditch Association
- Tournament format: Pool Play+Knockout
- Host: Associazione Italiana Quidditch
- Teams: 29

Final positions
- Champion: United States
- 1st runner-up: Belgium
- 2nd runner-up: Turkey

Tournament statistics
- Matches played: 102

The 2018 IQA World Cup was the fourth edition of the IQA World Cup, the international quidditch championship organized by the International Quidditch Association, the sport's global governing body. It was held in Florence, Italy between 27 June and 2 July 2018. Australia were the defending champions. The United States won their third championship after beating Belgium in the final. Over 800 athletes participated in competition.

== Bidding process ==
Seven nations expressed interest in hosting the tournament: Australia, Belgium, France, Italy, Turkey, the United Kingdom, and the United States. On 1 November, Florence, Italy was announced as the host.

== Participating teams ==
Champion Runner-up Third place Participant

Twenty-nine participated in the tournament:

Team	Previous appearances in tournament (Note: Bold: winner, Italics: host.)
Australia	3 (2012, 2014, **2016**)
Austria	1 (2016)
Belgium	2 (2014, 2016)
Brazil	1 (2016)
Canada	3 (2012, 2014, 2016)
Catalonia	1 (2016)
Czechia	0 (debut)
Finland	0 (debut)
France	3 (2012, 2014, 2016)
Germany	1 (2016)
Hong Kong	0 (debut)
Iceland	0 (debut)
Ireland	1 (2016)
Italy	1 (2016)
Malaysia	0 (debut)
Mexico	2 (2014, 2016)
Netherlands	1 (2016)
New Zealand	0 (debut)
Norway	1 (2016)
Poland	1 (2016)
Slovakia	1 (2016)
Slovenia	1 (2016)
South Korea	1 (2016)
Spain	1 (2016)
Switzerland	0 (debut)
Turkey	1 (2016)
United Kingdom	3 (2012, 2014, 2016)
United States	3 (**2012**, **2014**, 2016)
Vietnam	0 (debut)

=== Draw ===
Teams are placed in drawing pots based on their geographical location and their standing in the previous World Cup and European Games as follows:

1. Pot 1 contains the non-European teams that finished 7th or better at the 2016 World Cup as well as the best ranked teams from the 2017 European Games, for a total of seven teams.
2. Pot 2 contains the remaining non-European teams except Mexico.
3. Pot 3 contains the European teams ranked 5th to 11th at the 2017 European Games.
4. Pot 4 contains all remaining European teams.

Mexico is automatically assigned a spot as the 8th ranked team at the 2016 World Cup.

Pot 1
Team	Rank
Australia	W1
United States	W2
Canada	W4
United Kingdom	E1
France	E2
Norway	E3
Belgium	E4

Pot 2
Team
Brazil
Hong Kong
Malaysia
New Zealand
South Korea
Vietnam

Pot 3
Team	Rank
Germany	E5
Turkey	E6
Austria	E7
Italy	E8
Spain	E9
Catalonia	E10
Poland	E11

Pot 4
Team	Rank
Slovakia	E12
Netherlands	E13
Ireland	E14
Czech Republic	-
Finland	-
Iceland	-
Slovenia	-
Switzerland	-

The teams are drawn from the pots into six groups of four teams (A, B, C, D, E, and F) and one group of five teams (G). Teams from Pot 1 are drawn into each group's first position. Mexico takes position G2 and the other second positions are taken from Pot 2. Pot 3 teams are drawn in each group's third position, and the remaining positions are drawn from Pot 4.

== Group stage ==
In the group stage, teams compete in a cross-pool league system, whereby the teams in Group A play against the teams in Group B and similarly for Groups C and D, and Groups E and F. Only teams in Group G are playing against each other. At the end of the group stage, all teams are ranked together based on their performance.

Bracket seeding
Seed	Team
1	Germany
2	United Kingdom
3	United States
4	Belgium
5	France
6	Australia
7	Italy
8	Turkey
9	Canada
10	Spain
11	Mexico
12	Norway
13	Poland
14	Austria
15	Vietnam
16	Czech Republic
Lower bracket
17	Malaysia
18	Slovenia
19	South Korea
20	Switzerland
21	New Zealand
22	Netherlands
23	Ireland
24	Hong Kong
25	Slovakia
26	Catalonia
Relegation round-robin
27	Brazil
28	Finland
29	Iceland

=== Group A vs. Group B ===
Group A
Pos	Team	W	L	WSR	LSR	TP	Seed
1	France	3	1	-	-	-	5
2	Poland	2	2	-	-	-	13
3	South Korea	1	3	-	-	-	19
4	Finland	0	4	-	-	-	27

Group B
Pos	Team	W	L	WSR	LSR	TP	Seed
1	Belgium	4	0	-	-	-	4
2	Turkey	3	1	-	-	-	8
3	Slovenia	2	2	-	-	-	18
4	Hong Kong	1	3	-	-	-	24

Results
B A	(Belgium)	(Hong Kong)	(Turkey)	(Slovenia)
(France)	80–130*	180*–0	120*–30	230*–50
(South Korea)	50*–180	180*–90	20–150*	110–160*
(Poland)	20–130*	100*–30	70–160*	140*–60
(Finland)	20–240*	50–70*	30–140*	40–100*

=== Group C vs. Group D ===
Group C
Pos	Team	W	L	WSR	LSR	TP	Seed
1	Australia	3	1	-	-	-	6
2	Italy	3	1	-	-	-	8
3	Ireland	1	3	-	-	-	23
4	Brazil	0	4	-	-	-	28

Group D
Pos	Team	W	L	WSR	LSR	TP	Seed
1	United States	4	0	-	-	-	3
2	Austria	2	2	-	-	-	14
3	Vietnam	2	2	-	-	-	15
4	Netherlands	1	3	-	-	-	22

Results
D C	(United States)	(Vietnam)	(Austria)	(Netherlands)
(Australia)	60–90*	170*–20	170*–10	220*–0
(Brazil)	0–220*	50–180*	20–100*	60–90*
(Italy)	20–160*	120*–30	120–50*	200–50*
(Ireland)	0–230*	30–140*	10–130*	100*–80

=== Group E vs. Group F ===
Group E
Pos	Team	W	L	WSR	LSR	TP	Seed
1	Germany	4	0	-	-	-	1
2	Canada	3	1	-	-	-	9
3	Malaysia	2	2	-	-	-	17
4	Iceland	0	4	-	-	-	29

Group F
Pos	Team	W	L	WSR	LSR	TP	Seed
1	Spain	3	1	-	-	-	10
2	Norway	2	2	-	-	-	12
3	New Zealand	1	3	-	-	-	21
4	Switzerland	1	3	-	-	-	20

Results
F E	(Norway)	(New Zealand)	(Spain)	(Switzerland)
(Canada)	120*–80	240*–0	50–70*	200*–0
(Malaysia)	40–160*	150*–60	40–140*	160*–110
(Germany)	110*–40	210–60*	100–40*	100–40*
(Iceland)	10–260*	40–160*	0–150*	20–250*

=== Group G ===
Pos	Team	W	L	WSR	LSR	TP	Seed
1	United Kingdom	4	0	-	-	-	2
2	Mexico	3	1	-	-	-	11
3	Czech Republic	2	2	-	-	-	16
4	Slovakia	1	3	-	-	-	25
5	Catalonia	0	4	-	-	-	26

United Kingdom	160	–	50*	Slovakia

Mexico	80*	–	30	Catalonia

Catalonia	30*	–	200	United Kingdom

Slovakia	80	–	150*	Czech Republic

Czech Republic	90*	–	80	Catalonia

United Kingdom	160*	–	20	Mexico

Mexico	150*	–	40	Czech Republic

Catalonia	50	–	110*	Slovakia

Slovakia	30	–	110*	Mexico

Czech Republic	30*	–	180	United Kingdom

== Knockout stage ==
=== Upper bracket ===
Round of 16
Match 1
Germany	170
Czech Republic	50*
Match 2
Turkey	130*
Canada	110
Match 3
Belgium	150*
Poland	40
Match 4
France	110*
Norway	30
Match 5
United Kingdom	160*
Vietnam	0
Match 6
Italy	90*
Spain	20
Match 7
United States	180
Austria	60*
Match 8
Australia	110
Mexico	30*

Quarter-finals
Match 13
Germany	50
Turkey	100*
Match 14
Belgium	170**
France	140°°
Match 15
United Kingdom	80*
Italy	60
Match 16
United States	100*
Australia	30

Semi-finals
Match 23
Turkey	40
Belgium	90*
Match 24
United Kingdom	150
United States	160*

Final
Match 32
Belgium	70
United States	120*
Third place
Match 31
Turkey	110*
United Kingdom	60

==== Quarter-final consolation ====
First round
Match 21
Germany	50
France	120*
Match 22
Italy	50
Australia	180*

5th place
Match 25
France	80
Australia	210*
7th place
Match 26
Germany	80*
Italy	60

==== Round of 16 consolation ====
First round
Match 9
Czech Republic	0
Canada	210*
Match 10
Poland	120
Norway	220*
Match 11
Vietnam	70
Spain	150*
Match 12
Austria	110*
Mexico	90

Second round
Match 17
Canada	110*
Norway	80
Match 18
Spain	90*
Austria	10

9th place
Match 27
Canada	160*
Spain	50
11th place (canceled)
Match 28
Norway	—
Austria	—

Second round
Match 19
Czech Republic	90*
Poland	150
Match 20
Vietnam	50
Mexico	80*

13th place (canceled)
Match 29
Poland	—
Mexico	—
15th place (canceled)
Match 30
Czech Republic	—
Vietnam	—

=== Lower bracket ===
Play-in games
Match L1
Ireland	90*
Hong Kong	80
Match L2
Slovakia	30
Catalonia	80*

Quarter-finals
Match L3
Malaysia	150
Ireland	90*
Match L4
Switzerland	80
New Zealand	110*
Match L5
Slovenia	100*°
Catalonia	130°*
Match L6
South Korea	80
Netherlands	170*

Semi-finals
Match L8
Malaysia	100*
New Zealand	90
Match L9
Catalonia	100*
Netherlands	50

17th place
Match L13
Malaysia	90
Catalonia	120*
19th place
Match L12
New Zealand	80
Netherlands	150*

==== Lower bracket consolation ====
25th place
Match L7
Hong Kong	120*
Slovakia	50

=21st place
Match L10
Ireland	120*
Switzerland	90

=21st place
Match L11
Slovenia	180*
South Korea	50

=== Relegation round-robin ===
Seed	Team	W	L	PD	S%	Rank
27	Brazil	2	0	+240	100%	27
28	Finland	1	1	+60	50%	28
29	Iceland	0	2	−300	0%	29

Finland	80	–	170*	Brazil

Brazil	150*	–	0	Iceland

Finland	180*	–	20	Iceland
