= European Games (quadball) =

Quidditch tournament

Tournament information
- Sport: Quadball
- Month played: June / July
- Established: 2015
- Administrator: International Quadball Association; Quidditch Europe
- Participants: Varies

Current champion
- Germany

The IQA European Games (EG) are the biennial games for the sport of Quadball held in Europe where national governing bodies send national teams to compete. The European Games were created in response to the IQA World Cup, the biennial tournament wherein nations from around the world compete in a similar style to the FIFA World Cup. Both Games alternate years so in the off years regional tournaments such as the European Games or the Asian Quidditch Cup can occur. These games are the highest level of championships in quidditch aside from Global Games. The 2015 champions were Team France, narrowly beating Team UK.

== History ==
Locations of the European Games

The 2015 European Games were the inaugural championships of this tournament. Bid on by European cities, the organizational body Quidditch Europe decided on Sarteano, Italy to host the games. Sarteano proceeded to host an aggressive advertising campaign across the country as well as locally which included the sale of specially made artisanal crafts, wine and cheese. The 2019 edition was held in Bamberg, Germany.

== Format ==
The twelve teams competing in the 2015 games were separated into two groups of six teams. The group stage began on 25 July 2015 and ended the morning of the 26th. The groups themselves were split into pots based on EQC rankings and seasonal performance matched up. The top four teams from each group qualified for the bracket stage, where brackets were determined using the following criteria: games won, head-to-head, QPD (Note: QPD stands for "quaffle point differential" where the final score is tallied ignoring the 30 points given when the snitch is caught.) and SWIM catches. (Note: SWIM stands for "snitch when it matters" coming into play when a team wins when within snitch range, i.e. ± 30 pts.) Finally, the tournament ended with semi-finals, a third place final and the gold medal match.

== Results ==
Year	Host	Final			3rd place match			Teams
Year	Host	Champions	Score	Runners-up	3rd place	Score	4th place	Teams
2015; Details	(Italy); Sarteano	France	90*–50	United Kingdom	Norway	150*–80	Belgium	12
2017; Details	(Norway); Oslo	United Kingdom	90*–70	France	Norway	140*–80	Belgium	15
2019; Details	(Germany); Bamberg	France	150*–120°	Belgium	United Kingdom	110*–90°	Germany	20
2022; Details	(Republic of Ireland); Limerick	England	160*–140°	Germany	Australia (Note: Allowed to compete in the 2022 European Games after the Oceania-Asian Games were cancelled due to the COVID-19 pandemic.)	140-120*°	Norway	20
2024; Details	(England); London	Germany	90*–40	England	Belgium	110*-50	France	15
2026; Details	(Spain) Salou	Germany	140-120*	England	Norway	180*-60	Spain	15

== Medals summary ==
Rank	Nation	Gold	Silver	Bronze	Total
1	France	2	1	0	3
1	Germany	2	1	0	3
3	England	1	2	0	3
4	United Kingdom	1	1	1	3
5	Belgium	0	1	1	2
6	Norway	0	0	3	3
7	Australia	0	0	1	1
Totals (7 entries)		6	6	6	18

== Appearance ==
Team	(Italy) 2015 (12)	(Norway) 2017 (15)	(Germany) 2019 (20)	(Republic of Ireland) 2022 (20)	(England) 2024 (15)	(Spain) 2026 (15)	Total
Australia	•	•	•	3rd	•	•	1
Austria	•	7th	7th	6th	8th	7th	5
Basque Country	•	•	•	•	•	10th	1
Belgium	4th	4th	2nd	7th	3rd	5th	6
Catalonia	7th	10th	9th	11th	13th	11th	6
Czech Republic	•	•	19th	17th	•	•	2
Denmark	•	•	16th	•	•	•	1
England	•	•	•	1st	2nd	2nd	3
Finland	•	•	20th	•	•	•	1
France	1st	2nd	1st	5th	4th	6th	6
Germany	8th	5th	4th	2nd	1st	1st	6
Hong Kong	•	•	•	19th	•	•	1
Ireland	11th	14th	18th	13th	12th	12th	6
Italy	5th	8th	5th	9th	7th	•	5
Netherlands	10th	13th	13th	12th	•	•	4
Norway	3rd	3rd	6th	4th	6th	3rd	6
Poland	12th	11th	11th	10th	10th	•	5
Scotland	•	•	14th	15th	14th	14th	4
Slovakia	•	12th	12th	14th	•	•	3
Slovenia	•	•	15th	•	•	•	1
Spain	9th	9th	10th	8th	5th	4th	6
Sweden	•	15th	•	20th	•	•	2
Switzerland	•	•	17th	18th	15th	15th	4
Turkey	6th	6th	8th	•	9th	8th	5
United Kingdom	2nd	1st	3rd	•	•	•	3
Wales	•	•	•	16th	11th	13th	3

Legend

- 1st – Champions
- 2nd – Runners-up
- 3rd – Third place
- 4th – Fourth place
- • – Did not enter / Did not qualify
- – Hosts
- Q – Qualified for forthcoming tournament

Notes

Appearance maps

Sarteano 2015

Oslo 2017

Bamberg 2019

Limerick 2022

London 2024

== See also ==
- International Quidditch Association
- IQA World Cup
- Muggle quidditch
- European Quidditch Cup
