= 2016 IQA World Cup =

2016 quidditch tournament

IQA World Cup
- 2016

Tournament information
- Sport: Quidditch
- Location: Frankfurt, Germany
- Dates: 23–24 July 2016
- Administrator: International Quidditch Association
- Tournament format: Pool Play+Knockout
- Host: Deutscher Quidditchbund
- Venue: Rebstockanlage
- Teams: 21 (of 4 continents)

Final positions
- Champion: Australia
- 1st runner-up: United States
- 2nd runner-up: United Kingdom

Tournament statistics
- Matches played: 71
- Points scored: 12450 (175.35 per match)

The 2016 IQA World Cup is the third edition of the IQA World Cup, the international quidditch championship organized by the International Quidditch Association. It was held in Frankfurt, Germany on 23–24 July 2016. Australia won the cup 150*–130 against the United States; the latter team had won all the previous editions. 21 nations competed, including Australia, Canada, Ireland, and the United Kingdom. A crowdfunding campaign aimed to send the Ugandan team as the first-ever African nation to compete internationally. However, the team members failed to obtain a German visa and withdrew from the competition. The Peruvian team also withdrew before the competition due to a lack of funds. A documentary entitled Fly the Movie: Journey to Frankfurt followed the British team in their preparation before the cup.

== Participating teams ==
Runner-up Third place Participant Withdrawn 24 teams were expected to participate to the Cup:

Team	Previous appearances in tournament (Note: Bold: winner, Italics: host. Odd years are European Games, even years are World Cups.)
Australia	2 (2012, 2014)
Austria	
Belgium	2 (2014, 2015)
Brazil	
Canada	2 (2012, 2014)
Catalonia	1 (2015)
France	3 (2012, 2014, 2015)
Germany (host)	1 (2015)
Ireland	1 (2015)
Italy	1 (2015)
Mexico	1 (2014)
Netherlands	1 (2015)
Norway	1 (2015)
Peru	withdrawn
Poland	1 (2015)
Slovakia	
Slovenia	
South Korea	
Spain	1 (2015)
Turkey	1 (2015)
Uganda	withdrawn
United Kingdom	3 (2012, 2014, 2015)
United States	2 (2012, 2014)

=== Draw ===
The 2014 world medalists and the 2015 European finalists were placed in pod 1. Other teams who have participated in international tournaments filled up pods 2 through 4 based on their finishing rank. Teams participating for the first time were placed randomly in pods 4 and 5.

Pod 1
Team	Rank
United States	W1
Australia	W2
Canada	W3
France	E1
United Kingdom	E2

Pod 2
Team	Rank
Mexico	W5
Norway	E3
Belgium	E4
Italy	E5
Turkey	E6

Pod 3
Team	Rank
Catalonia	E7
Germany	E8
Spain	E9
Netherlands	E10
Ireland	E11

Pod 4
Team	Rank
Poland	E12
Uganda	–
South Korea	–
Brazil	–
Slovakia	–

Pod 5
Team	Rank
Austria	–
Peru	–
Slovenia	–

The teams were drawn into five groups of four or five teams, with one team per pod in each group, and Pod 5 teams assigned to three randomly chosen groups. Every group was guaranteed at least one non-European team. However, with Peru and Uganda withdrawing, only one five-team pool was left, and Pool 1 consisted of European teams only.

Pool 1
Team	Pod
France	1
Italy	2
Netherlands	3
Uganda (withdrawn)	4
Slovenia	5

Pool 2
Team	Pod
Australia	1
Belgium	2
Ireland	3
Slovakia	4

Pool 3
Team	Pod
United Kingdom	1
Turkey	2
Spain	3
South Korea	4
Austria	5

Pool 4
Team	Pod
Canada	1
Mexico	2
Catalonia	3
Poland	4
Peru (withdrawn)	5

Pool 5
Team	Pod
United States	1
Norway	2
Germany	3
Brazil	4

== Structure ==
After the pool play, all teams were seeded and moved on to the bracket phase. Teams were seeded according to the following criteria:

1. Rank in pool;
2. Number of losses;
3. Head-to-head result;
4. Average point differential (With a cap of 120, includes snitch catches);
5. Snitch catch percentage;
6. Coin flip.

Since all teams would participate to the bracket phase, seeds 12 to 21 started with play-in games whereas seeds 1 to 11 got a bye to the round of 16. During bracket play, each round beginning with the round of 16 generated a consolation bracket. The bracket phase determined the final ranking for teams 1 to 16.

== Results ==
Asterisks* indicate the team that ended the game by catching the snitch.

=== Pool play ===
Bracket seeding
Category	Seed	Team
Pool winners	1	Canada
Pool winners	2	United States
Pool winners	3	United Kingdom
Pool winners	4	France
Pool winners	5	Australia
Pool runners-up	6	Turkey
Pool runners-up	7	Belgium
Pool runners-up	8	Mexico
Pool runners-up	9	Norway
Pool runners-up	10	Italy
Pool; 3rd place	11	Austria
Pool; 3rd place	Play-in cutoff	
Pool; 3rd place	12	Germany
Pool; 3rd place	13	Slovakia
Pool; 3rd place	14	Slovenia
Pool; 3rd place	15	Catalonia
Pool; 4th place	16	Spain
Pool; 4th place	17	Netherlands
Pool; 4th place	18	Poland
Pool; 4th place	19	Ireland
Pool; 4th place	20	Brazil
Pool; 5th place	21	South Korea

==== Pool 1 ====
Pos	Team	W	L	APD	S%	Seed
1	France	3	0	116.7	100%	4
2	Italy	2	1	13.3	33%	10
3	Slovenia	1	2	−53.3	67%	14
4	Netherlands	0	3	−76.7	0%	17

Italy	140*	–	40	Netherlands

France	240*	–	50	Slovenia

Italy	130	–	80*	Slovenia

France	240*	–	0	Netherlands

France	160*	–	50	Italy

Netherlands	90	–	100*	Slovenia

==== Pool 2 ====
Pos	Team	W	L	APD	S%	Seed
1	Australia	3	0	100	67%	5
2	Belgium	2	1	53.3	67%	7
3	Slovakia	1	2	−50	67%	13
4	Ireland	0	3	−103.3	0%	19

Ireland	50	–	120*	Slovakia

Australia	130	–	70*	Belgium

Belgium	250*	–	20	Ireland

Australia	230*	–	10	Slovakia

Australia	260*	–	0	Ireland

Belgium	160	–	60*	Slovakia

==== Pool 3 ====
Pos	Team	W	L	APD	S%	Seed
1	United Kingdom	4	0	117.5	75%	3
2	Turkey	3	1	55	50%	6
3	Austria	2	2	−22.5	75%	11
4	Spain	1	3	−37.5	25%	16
5	South Korea	0	4	−112.5	25%	21

United Kingdom	170*	–	40	Turkey

Spain	110*	–	10	South Korea

United Kingdom	170*	–	0	Austria

Turkey	200*	–	40	South Korea

Spain	70	–	80*	Austria

United Kingdom	150	–	40*	South Korea

Turkey	180*	–	50	Spain

Turkey	160	–	60*	Austria

United Kingdom	220*	–	0	Spain

South Korea	Forfeit (0	–	150*)	Austria

==== Pool 4 ====
Pos	Team	W	L	APD	S%	Seed
1	Canada	3	0	120	100%	1
2	Mexico	2	1	40	67%	8
3	Catalonia	1	2	−66.7	0%	15
4	Poland	0	3	−93.3	33%	18

Canada	180*	–	20	Catalonia

Mexico	200*	–	20	Poland

Catalonia	110	–	70*	Poland

Canada	180*	–	20	Mexico

Mexico	260*	–	130	Catalonia

Canada	240*	–	0	Poland

==== Pool 5 ====
Pos	Team	W	L	APD	S%	Seed
1	United States	3	0	120	67%	2
2	Norway	2	1	13.3	67%	9
3	Germany	1	2	−26.7	67%	12
4	Brazil	0	3	−106.7	0%	20

Norway	140*	–	60	Germany

United States	210*	–	0	Brazil

United States	170	–	40*	Germany

Norway	150*	–	70	Brazil

United States	230*	–	10	Norway

Germany	200*	–	50	Brazil

=== Championship bracket ===
Play-in games
8:00
Spain	130
Netherlands	60*
8:00
Slovakia	40
Brazil	150*
Forfeit
Germany	150*
South Korea	0
8:00
Catalonia	90
Poland	40*
8:00
Slovenia	150*
Ireland	70

Round of 16
9:30
Canada	170*
Spain	30
10:15
Mexico	100*
Norway	80
9:30
France	190
Brazil	50*
10:15
Australia	150*
Germany	20
9:30
United States	270*
Catalonia	10
10:15
Belgium	210*
Italy	130
9:30
United Kingdom	220*
Slovenia	20
10:15
Turkey	100
Austria	50*

Quarter-finals
12:15
Canada	140*
Mexico	30
12:15
France	60
Australia	110*
12:15
United States	130*
Belgium	50
12:15
United Kingdom	180*
Turkey	40

Semi-finals
15:45
Canada	40
Australia	80*
15:45
United States	140*
United Kingdom	40

Final
18:30
Australia	150*
United States	130
Third place
17:30
United Kingdom	190*
Canada	60

=== Quarter-final consolation ===
First round
13:45
Mexico	10
France	160*
13:45
Belgium	140
Turkey	150*

Fifth place
16:30
France	140*
Turkey	50
Seventh place
16:30
Mexico	30
Belgium	150*

=== Round of 16 consolation ===
First round
11:30
Norway	180*
Brazil	40
11:30
Slovenia	30
Germany	140*
11:30
Italy	50
Spain	110*
13:45
Catalonia	130*
Austria	70

Second round
13:45
Norway	80*
Germany	60
13:45
Spain	130*
Catalonia	80

Ninth place
15:00
Norway	170*
Spain	30
Eleventh place
16:30
Germany	250*
Catalonia	60

Second round
13:00
Italy	200*
Brazil	60
13:00
Slovenia	110
Austria	120*

Thirteenth place
15:00
Italy	140*
Austria	40
Fifteenth place
15:00
Slovenia	170*
Brazil	120
