= Spain national quidditch team =

National sports team

Spain
- Nickname: The Spanish Inquiddsition
- Association: Asociación Quidditch España
- Conference: Quidditch Europe
- Head coach: (Community of Madrid) Miguel Vázquez
- Website: Facebook page

The Spanish national quidditch team is a team created with Spanish quidditch players. Since 2015 it has represented Association Quidditch Spain in the different national team tournaments organized by the IQA.

The team played for the first time in July 2015 in the European Games of Sarteano, Italy.

== History ==
Home	Away
Home and away uniforms

=== Origins ===
In 2015, with the Association Quidditch Spain recently created and with the announcement of the celebration of the first European Games, the first Spanish national team to take part in this competition was created.

=== 2015 European Games ===
The Spanish Inquiddsition in this competition was unsuccessful. The bets were not in favour of the team, but they had a better than expected performance. They played in the group B beside Belgium, Catalonia, France, Poland and Turkey. They ranked ninth in the championship, without qualifying for the quarter-finals, and winning only in the inaugural game against Poland.

=== 2016 World Cup ===
On March 29, 2016, the Asociación Quidditch España published the roster for the Spanish national team for the 2016 IQA World Cup. On June 25, 2016, the IQA released the pool play draw, where Team Spain was assigned to pool C with United Kingdom, Turkey, South Korea and Austria.

== Players ==
=== 2018 IQA World Cup roster ===
#	Name	Team	Position
1	(Castile and León) Adrián Picón	(Castile and León) Blue Gryffins Burgos	Keeper/Chaser/Seeker
2	(Galicia (Spain)) Pedro Maceira	(Galicia (Spain)) Lumos Compostela	Keeper
3	(Community of Madrid) Héctor Cabrera	(Community of Madrid) Madrid Lynx	Beater
4	(Galicia (Spain)) Raquel Martínez	(Galicia (Spain)) Lumos Compostela	Chaser
5	(Valencian Community) Martín Navarro	(Valencian Community) Buckbeak Riders	Chaser
6	(Basque Country (autonomous community)) Blanca Brenes	(Basque Country (autonomous community)) Gasteiz Gamusins	Keeper/Chaser
7	(Basque Country (autonomous community)) Irene Velasco	(Basque Country (autonomous community)) Bizkaia Boggarts	Chaser
9	(Castile and León) Marcos López	(Castile and León) Blue Gryffins Burgos	Beater
10	(Galicia (Spain)) Pablo Rey	(Galicia (Spain)) Lumos Compostela	Beater
11	(Galicia (Spain)) Manuel E. Lago	(Galicia (Spain)) Lumos Compostela	Chaser/Seeker
12	(Community of Madrid) Daniel Báscones	(Community of Madrid) Madrid Wolves	Beater
13	(Community of Madrid) Miguel Vázquez	(Basque Country (autonomous community)) Bizkaia Boggarts	Chaser
14	(Valencian Community) Eduardo Cebrián	(United Kingdom) Sheffield QC	Keeper/Chaser
17	(Community of Madrid) Naira Rodríguez	(Community of Madrid) Madrid Lynx	Chaser/Seeker
18	(Galicia (Spain)) Pedro Muiños	(Galicia (Spain)) Lumos Compostela	Keeper
21	(Basque Country (autonomous community)) Marina Salvidea	(Basque Country (autonomous community)) Gasteiz Gamusins	Beater
22	(Community of Madrid) Artur Martin	(Basque Country (autonomous community)) Bizkaia Boggarts	Chaser/Seeker
23	(Galicia (Spain)) Jorge Martínez	(Galicia (Spain)) Lumos Compostela	Beater
24	(Extremadura) Raquel Macías	(Castile and León) Blue Gryffins Burgos	Chaser
27	(Andalusia) Paula Marmolejo (c)	(United Kingdom) London Unspeakables	Beater
31	(Community of Madrid) Lidia González	(Community of Madrid) Madrid Lynx	Beater
33	(Andalusia) Alberto García	(United Kingdom) London Unspeakables	Chaser
38	(Andalusia) Manuel Jiménez 'Xim'	(Andalusia) Malaka Vikings	Chaser/Seeker
88	(Galicia (Spain)) Vicky 'Tormenta' Alexis	(Galicia (Spain)) Lumos Compostela	Beater
96	(United Kingdom) Max RM Freemantle	(Andalusia) Malaka Vikings	Beater

=== 2016 IQA World Cup roster ===
#	Name	Team	Position
00	(Basque Country (autonomous community)) Ander Carbón 'Andertxu'	(Basque Country (autonomous community)) Bizkaia Boggarts	Beater
2	(Andalusia) Antonio 'TONO' Rodríguez	(Community of Madrid) Madrid Wolves	Chaser
π	(Andalusia) Paula Marmolejo	(Andalusia) Malaka Vikings	Chaser
6	(Castile and León) Siena Martínez	(Community of Madrid) Madrid Lynx	Beater/Chaser
7	(Basque Country (autonomous community)) Irene Velasco	(Basque Country (autonomous community)) Bizkaia Boggarts	Chaser
8	(Balearic Islands) Pau Tomàs Riutort		Seeker
9	(Community of Madrid) Andi de Alfonso	(United States) Tri-State Lightning	Beater
10	(Community of Madrid) Steven Paisley	(United States) FIU Quidditch	Beater
12	(Community of Madrid) Daniel Báscones	(Community of Madrid) Madrid Wolves	Beater
13	(Community of Madrid) Miguel Vázquez	(Basque Country (autonomous community)) Bizkaia Boggarts	Keeper
14	(Andalusia) Leticia Colinas	(United Kingdom) London Unspeakables	Beater
17	(Basque Country (autonomous community)) Josema Molinos	(Basque Country (autonomous community)) Bizkaia Boggarts	Chaser
21	(Andalusia) Cristina M. Domingo	(Andalusia) Malaka Vikings	Beater
22	(Community of Madrid) Artur Martin	(Community of Madrid) Madrid Wolves	Chaser
38	(Andalusia) Manuel Jiménez 'Xim'	(Andalusia) Malaka Vikings	Chaser
88	(Andalusia) Marina Blasco	(Andalusia) Malaka Vikings	Chaser
99	(Community of Madrid) Pedro González-Tarrío	(United Kingdom) London Unspeakables	Keeper
403	(Basque Country (autonomous community)) Andoni Aranguren	(Basque Country (autonomous community)) Bizkaia Boggarts	Keeper
672	(Cantabria) Sergio Gutiérrez 'Guti'	(Basque Country (autonomous community)) Bizkaia Boggarts	Chaser
666	(Community of Madrid) Laura Moreno	(Community of Madrid) Madrid Wolves	Beater
∞	(Castile and León) Diego Ávila	(Community of Madrid) Madrid Lynx	Chaser/Keeper

=== 2015 IQA European Games roster ===
#	Name	Team	Position
00	(Basque Country (autonomous community)) Ander Carbón	(Basque Country (autonomous community)) Bizkaia Boggarts	Beater
2	(Andalusia) Antonio 'TONO' Rodríguez	(Andalusia) Malaka Vikings	Chaser
π	(Andalusia) Paula Marmolejo	(Andalusia) Malaka Vikings	Chaser
4	(Basque Country (autonomous community)) Javier Fernández	(Basque Country (autonomous community)) Bizkaia Boggarts	Keeper/Chaser
6	(Cantabria) Sergio Gutiérrez 'GUTI'	(Basque Country (autonomous community)) Bizkaia Boggarts	Chaser
7	(Basque Country (autonomous community)) Irene Velasco	(Basque Country (autonomous community)) Bizkaia Boggarts	Chaser
8	(Community of Madrid) Julia López	(Community of Madrid) Madrid Wolves	Beater
9	(Community of Madrid) Andi de Alfonso	(United States) New York Badassilisks	Beater
10	(Balearic Islands) Pau Tomàs Riutort		Seeker
11	(Basque Country (autonomous community)) Yeray Espinosa (c)	(Basque Country (autonomous community)) Bizkaia Boggarts	Chaser
12	(Community of Madrid) Daniel Báscones	(Community of Madrid) Madrid Wolves	Beater
13	(Community of Madrid) Miguel Vázquez	(Community of Madrid) Madrid Wolves	Chaser
14	(Andalusia) Leti Colinas	(United Kingdom) London Unspeakables	Beater
15	(Community of Madrid) Isidro Álvarez	(Community of Madrid) Madrid Wolves	Chaser
17	(Basque Country (autonomous community)) Marina Salvidea	(Basque Country (autonomous community)) Gasteiz Gamusins	Beater
19	(Community of Madrid) Jorge Manzano	(Community of Madrid) Madrid Wolves	Chaser
22	(Andalusia) Bienve Moreno	(Andalusia) Malaka Vikings	Chaser
23	(Community of Madrid) Rion Blake	(Community of Madrid) Madrid Wolves	Beater
42	(Community of Madrid) Raúl 'PATO' Llorente	(Community of Madrid) Madrid Wolves	Keeper/Chaser
99	(Community of Madrid) Pedro Tarrío	(United Kingdom) London Unspeakables	Keeper
666	(Community of Madrid) Laura Moreno	(Community of Madrid) Madrid Wolves	Beater

== Scores ==
=== Last games ===
Date	Competition	Local		Resulted		Visitor
24/07/2016	2016 World Cup - Play-in Games	Spain	(Spain)	130-60*	(Netherlands)	Netherlands
24/07/2016	2016 World Cup - Round of 16	Canada	(Canada)	170*-30	(Spain)	Spain
24/07/2016	2016 World Cup - Consolation first round	Italy	(Italy)	50-110*	(Spain)	Spain
24/07/2016	2016 World Cup - Consolation second round	Spain	(Spain)	130*^-80	(Catalonia)	Catalonia
24/07/2016	2016 World Cup - Ninth place game	Norway	(Norway)	170*-30	(Spain)	Spain

Previous games
Date	Competition	Local		Resulted		Visitor
25/07/2015	European Games 2015 - Pool Play	Spain	(Spain)	170*-0	(Poland)	Poland
25/07/2015	European Games 2015 - Pool Play	Belgium	(Belgium)	140*-20	(Spain)	Spain
25/07/2015	European Games 2015 - Pool Play	France	(France)	160*-10	(Spain)	Spain
25/07/2015	European Games 2015 - Pool Play	Spain	(Spain)	30-100*	(Turkey)	Turkey
26/07/2015	European Games 2015 - Pool Play	Catalonia	(Catalonia)	160*-70	(Spain)	Spain
23/07/2016	2016 World Cup - Pool Play	Spain	(Spain)	110*-10	(South Korea)	South Korea
23/07/2016	2016 World Cup - Pool Play	Spain	(Spain)	70-80*	(Austria)	Austria
23/07/2016	2016 World Cup - Pool Play	Turkey	(Turkey)	180*-50	(Spain)	Spain
23/07/2016	2016 World Cup - Pool Play	United Kingdom	(United Kingdom)	220*-0	(Spain)	Spain
24/07/2016	2016 World Cup - Play-in Game	Spain	(Spain)	130-60*	(Netherlands)	Netherlands
24/07/2016	2016 World Cup - Round of 16	Canada	(Canada)	170*-30	(Spain)	Spain
24/07/2016	2016 World Cup - R16 consolation first round	Italy	(Italy)	50-110*	(Spain)	Spain
24/07/2016	2016 World Cup - R16 consolation second round	Spain	(Spain)	130*^-80	(Catalonia)	Catalonia
24/07/2016	2016 World Cup - 9th position game	Norway	(Norway)	170*-30	(Spain)	Spain

== Statistics ==
Legend: Pl: Played games; W: Won games; L: Games lost; QPD: Quaffle Point Difference; SWIM: Snitch When It Matters.

=== IQA World Cup ===
Competition	Performance	Rank	Pl	W	L	QPD	Snitch catch
(United Kingdom) Oxford 2012	Did not participate
(Canada) Burnaby 2014	Did not participate
(Germany) Frankfurt 2016	Ninth place game	10th	9	4	5	-300	40%
Total	1/3		9	4	5	-300	40%

=== European Games ===
Competition	Resulted	Position	Pl	W	L	QPD	Snitch catch
(Italy) Sarteano 2015	First round	9th	5	1	4	-210	20%
Total	1/1		5	1	4	-210	20%
