= 2015 IQA European Games =

European Games
- 2015

Tournament information
- Sport: Quidditch
- Location: Sarteano, Italy
- Dates: 25–26 July 2015
- Administrator: International Quidditch Association; Quidditch Europe
- Tournament format(s): Pool play Single elimination bracket
- Host: Associazione Italiana Quidditch
- Venue: Pian di Mengole
- Teams: 12

Final positions
- Champion: France
- 1st runner-up: United Kingdom
- 2nd runner-up: Norway

Tournament statistics
- Matches played: 38

The 2015 IQA European Games, also known simply as the European Games, was the inaugural European championship for the sport of quidditch organized jointly by Sarteano2015, Quidditch Europe and the International Quidditch Association. The tournament was held the weekend of the 24–26 July 2015 in the city of Sarteano, Italy. France took first against the United Kingdom with a final score of 90*–50, and Norway came in third winning 150*–80 against Belgium.

As these were the first European Games and since Quidditch is still expanding in Europe, the only requirement for teams wishing to compete was to have a national governing body. Planning is underway for the 2017 European Games. Quidditch Europe and the IQA will work together and start accepting bids in the 2015–2016 season.

== Organization ==
After a bidding process released by Quidditch Europe and the IQA, Sarteano was announced as the winner. Building up to the events, Sarteano established several marketing campaigns across the country, across Europe and in the United States. Teams arrived to major airports within Italy with buses prepared to transport athletes to the site of the Games. The pitches themselves were maintained and organized to offer teams space to practise, to rest and to take shelter. Additionally, the town organized several entertainment events open to the public, from workshops to live concerts.

== Competing teams ==
The following twelve teams competed in the 2015 European Games:

Winner Runner-up Third place Participant

Team	Number of athletes	National governing body	Previous appearances in World Cup (Note: Bold: winner, Italics: host.)
Belgium	21	Belgian Quidditch Federation	1 (2014)
Catalonia	21	Associació de Quidditch de Catalunya	
France	21	Fédération du quidditch français	2 (2012, 2014)
Germany	14	Deutscher Quidditchbund	
Ireland	8	Quidditch Ireland	
Italy (host)	20	Associazione Italiana Quidditch	
Netherlands	13	Muggle Quidditch Nederland	
Norway	17	Norges Rumpeldunkforbund	
Poland	7	Polska Liga Quidditcha	
Spain	21	Asociación Quidditch España	
Turkey	14	Quidditch Derneği	
United Kingdom	21	QuidditchUK	2 (2012, 2014)

== Broadcasting ==
Unlike many other quidditch events, there was no livestream available. However, volunteers updated a live Twitter account for online followers and several media outlets were present to report on the games.

== Match officials ==
As the games happened during the off-season for most leagues, several officials came from the United States and Canada to referee and snitch events. Most teams supplied volunteer referees to fill in gaps where there was a lack of availability of non-playing officials. There were no player-snitches; in fact, the snitch with the most play time was Nicole Stone of QuidditchUK nicknamed "Little Snitch".

== Marketing ==
Sarteano, Italy

The city of Sarteano established an aggressive marketing campaign that extended beyond the city's and country's borders. Importantly, craftspeople and artisans across the city started to sell European Games wares available for a limited amount of time such as pottery, wine and cheese. One of the most ambitious advertising campaigns run was for free bottles of specialty wine where adverts were places across European cities and even in New York.

== Structure and results ==
The tournament structure consisted of an initial pool play where pools consisted of pots which were based on EQC rankings and seasonal performance matched up. The top four teams from each group then would proceed to bracket play, where brackets were decided using the following criteria: games won, head-to-head, QPD (Note: QPD stands for "quaffle point differential" where the final score is tallied ignoring the 30 points given when the snitch is caught. QPD is capped at ±150 per game.) and SWIM catches. (Note: SWIM stands for "snitch when it matters" coming into play when a team wins when within snitch range, i.e. ± 30 pts.) Finally, matches will end in semi-finals, third place final and the gold medal match.

=== Group phase ===
==== Group A ====
Pos	Team	W	L	QPD	SWIM	Qualification	(Poland)	(Spain)	(Catalonia)	(Turkey)	(Belgium)
1	France	5	0	+570	0	Qualify for knock-out phase	360*–10	160*–10	190*–30	190*–60	150*–50
2	Belgium	4	1	+380	0	Qualify for knock-out phase	150*–0	140*–20	190*–50	140–50*	
3	Turkey	3	2	−40	1	Qualify for knock-out phase	200*–0	100*–30	100*–80		
4	Catalonia	2	3	−30	0	Qualify for knock-out phase	190*–0	160*–70			
5	Spain	1	4	−170	0		170*–0				
6	Poland	0	5	−720	0						

==== Group B ====
Pos	Team	W	L	QPD	SWIM	Qualification	(Ireland)	(Netherlands)	(Germany)	(Italy)	(Norway)
1	United Kingdom	5	0	+500	0	Qualify for knock-out phase	260*–0	200–30*	120–30*	110*–30	100*–40
2	Norway	4	1	+370	0	Qualify for knock-out phase	280*–10	220*–0	80–50*	110*–40	
3	Italy	3	2	+170	0	Qualify for knock-out phase	180*–0	120*–20	100*–30		
4	Germany	2	3	−20	0	Qualify for knock-out phase	110–50*	120–40*			
5	Netherlands	1	4	−480	1		60*–30				
6	Ireland	0	5	−540	0						

=== Bracket phase ===
Quarter-finals
France	160
Germany	30*
Norway	160*
Turkey	50
United Kingdom	190*
Catalonia	0
Belgium	90
Italy	30*

Semi-finals
France	110*
Norway	40
United Kingdom	80*
Belgium	40

Final
France	90*
United Kingdom	50
Third place
Norway	150*
Belgium	80

=== Final rankings ===
Rank	Team
1st place, gold medalist(s)	France
2nd place, silver medalist(s)	United Kingdom
3rd place, bronze medalist(s)	Norway
4	Belgium
5	Italy
6	Turkey
7	Catalonia
8	Germany
9	Spain
10	Netherlands
11	Ireland
12	Poland

== Prizes ==
The European Games offered two prizes in total: First Place and MVP. The first place prize was a handcrafted, metal sculpture created by a local artisan for this event, which was awarded to Team France upon their win. The MVP award, a hand-painted artwork, went to player Ollie Craig for his efforts within the tournament.

== See also ==
- International Quidditch Association
- Muggle quidditch
- European Games (quidditch)
- European Quidditch Cup
