= Australia national quadball team =

Australian sporting team

Team Australia
- Full name: Australian National Quadball Team
- Nickname: Team Australia Dropbears (World Cup) Aurora Australis (Nations Cup)
- Sport: Quidditch/Quadball
- Founded: 2011
- Association: Quadball Australia
- Colours: Green and Gold
- Anthem: Thunderstruck
- Head coach: Tom Russell
- Manager: Liz Schultz
- Championships: 2016
- Website: quidditchaustralia.org

The Australian national quadball team, known as the Dropbears, is the representative national team in the sport of quadball for Australia. The team made history in 2016 when it won the 2016 IQA World Cup, becoming the first non-USA Quidditch World Champions.

Australia made its international debut in 2012 at the IQA Summer Games in Oxford, UK, and is one of only 4 national teams to have competed in all 6 IQA World Cups. Until 2025, the Dropbears were the only team to ever beat the United States at an international level and, after beating them at the 2025 World Cup to win bronze, are the only team to beat the USA twice.

The team is regulated by Quadball Australia and is a national member of the International Quadball Association, competing in the Oceania-Asian division of the IQA Continental Games.

== History ==
The Australian national team, known at the time as the 'Australian Olympic Quidditch Team', made its debut in 2012 at the International Quidditch Association Summer Games held 8 July 2012 in Oxford, England. Scheduled to coincide with the 2012 Summer Olympics, the tournament later became the first iteration of the IQA Quidditch World Cup. Australia placed third of the five teams competing, defeating Canada 60*-50 (Note: In real-life quidditch, aka quadball, a snitch catch is worth 30 points and is noted on the score by an asterisk (*).) in the Bronze Medal match.

The first official National Squad was formed in 2014 in the lead up to what would retrospectively become the second IQA World Cup, known at the time as Global Games. The national team, adopting the official nickname "The Dropbears", was one of seven participating countries at the tournament held 19-20 July 2014 in Burnaby, Canada. Australia earned a spot in the final by defeating France, Mexico, Belgium, the UK, and Canada in pool play, before losing to the United States 210*-0 in the final and walking away with the silver medal.

The third international quidditch world cup was held 23-24 July 2016 in Frankfurt, Germany, where Australia was one of 21 teams competing. The team defeated Germany, France, and Canada in pool play on day 1, progressing to bracket play on Sunday, where they beat Canada and France to earn the spot in the gold medal match.

A repeat of 2014 saw Australia and defending champions the United States facing off in the final. After a long and tightly contested match, the Dropbears eventually claimed Gold with a snitch catch, defeating the United States 150*-130. The 2016 World Champion Dropbears squad was coached by Gen Gibson and captained by James Mortenson.

This historic win took the international quidditch community by storm, being a significant upset against Team USA who were previously undefeated in the entire history of the sport.

The Dropbears finished 5th at the 2018 World Cup, held 27 June - 2 July 2018 in Florence, Italy, after being defeated by the United States (the eventual winners) in the quarterfinals. The fifth IQA World Cup was scheduled to take place in 2020 in Richmond, United States, but was delayed to 2021 and then again to 2023 due to the COVID-19 pandemic.

Australia was subsequently invited to attend the 2022 European Games, an international tournament hosted in the off-years between the World Cup. This was seen as controversial by some due to the fact that the tournament is specifically designed for teams based in Europe and since Australia has a strong international record they therefore went into the tournament as a favourite despite never competing in it before. However, the IQA defended allowing both Australia and Hong Kong to compete due to the lack of an equivalent continental games tournament in their region. Australia finished third at the tournament, defeating Norway 140-120* to claim the bronze medal.

The fifth world cup took place 15-16 July 2023 in Richmond, United States, where Australia finished 7th after being defeated by Belgium in the quarterfinals.

In 2024, the Australian Development Team, known as "Aurora Australis", was formed, making their international debut at the Quadball Nations Cup. The tournament, an international-level elite tournament designed for development teams and emerging players, took place 5-6 October 2024 in Salou, Spain, where Australia finished 6th overall after being knocked out in the quarterfinals by Team World.

The 2025 IQA World Cup was held 11-13 July 2025 in Tubize, Belgium. Australia was seeded 4th after pool play after winning all their games, before losing to eventual winners Belgium in the semis. They then defeated the USA in the 3rd place play-off 90*-80 to win bronze.

== Competitive record ==
=== IQA World Cup ===
Competition	Position
(United Kingdom) 2012 Summer Games	3rd of 5
(Canada) 2014 Global Games	2nd of 7
(Germany) 2016 World Cup	1st of 21
(Italy) 2018 World Cup	5th of 29
(United States) 2023 World Cup ^{†}	7th of 15
(Belgium) 2025 World Cup	3rd of 31

^{†} The 2020 World Cup was initially postponed to 2021 due to COVID-19, and later further postponed to 2023.

=== European Games ===
Competition	Position
(Republic of Ireland) 2022 European Games	3rd of 20

=== Nations Cup ===
Competition	Position
(Spain) 2024 Nations Cup	6th of 20

Australia participated as "Aurora Australis", their official development team.

== International Squad Lists ==
=== IQA World Cup 2025 (Brussels, Belgium) ===
The squad for the 2025 IQA World Cup was announced on December 13, being coached by current national head coach Tom Russell.

Player
Hannah Walravens (Co-Captain)
Jakob Sutherland (Co-Captain)
Aaron Sibel
Alex Cunningham
Arabella Barr
Ashan Abey
Ava McConnell
Brandon Frison
Cameron Walker
Caroline Crawford
Harrison Jones
Isobel Rennie
Joshua Lindley
Kelsey Collins
Luke Derrick
Maddi Moulton
Madeleine Bell
Max Brenner
Nathan Morton
Nicki Redman
Olivia Coleman
Rajtilak Kapoor
Samantha Chittenden
Sarah King
Vicki Huynh

=== Quadball Nations Cup 2024 (Salou, Spain) ===
The squad for the 2024 Nations Cup was coached by Tom Russell and captained by Rajtilak Kapoor and Ava McConnell. QNC rules limit the number of players a team can name who competed at for any country at the most recent IQA World Cup.

Player	Number	Notes
Rajtilak Kapoor (Co-Captain)	7	
Ava McConnell (Co-Captain)	15	
Ashan Abey (withdrew)	n/a	Also named as an Assistant Coach
Giacomo Agbugba	3	
Arabella Barr	99	
Brendan Briscoe-Hough	16	
Zale Briscoe-Hough	57	
Kelsey Collins	89	
Alex Cunningham	42	
Jack Emerton-Bain	29	
Cooper Fitzgerald	4	
Vicki Hunynh	22	
Chloe Kneebone	39	
Xavier Luna	18	
Maddi Moulton	23	
Kimberley Parry	86	
Chris Peak	28	
Caitlin Rapson	27	
Nicki Redman (withdrew)	n/a	Injured prior to tournament
Liz Schultz	94	
Aaron Sibel	35	
Eloise Taylor	11	
Phil Vankerkoerle	34	
Charlotte Wen	8	

=== IQA World Cup 2023 (Richmond, United States) ===
The squad for the 2023 World Cup was captained by Samantha Chittenden and coached by Luke Derrick.

Surname	First Name
Chittenden	Samantha (Captain)
Morton	Nathan (Vice-Captain)
Astalosh	Natalie
Bell	Madeleine
Brenner	Max
Coleman	Olivia
Crawford	Caroline
Creffield	Ruth
Derrick	Luke
Frison	Brandon
Hockey	Kaysanne
Jones	Harrison
Lindley	Jessica
Lindley	Joshua
Mayling	Callum
Redman	Nicki
Spann	Simon
Sutherland	Jacob
Walker	Cameron
Walravens	Hannah
Vinet	Edward

Reserves
Ashan Abey (replaced Baldeep Uppal, named as a reserve)
Joe Dodd (replaced Gary Hague, named as a reserve)
Nicola Gertler
Ava McConnell (replaced Kaitlin Taylor, named as a reserve)
Gary Hague (named in initial squad, pulled out prior to final team selection)
Kaitlin Taylor (named in initial squad, pulled out prior to final team selection)
Baldeep Uppal (named in initial squad, pulled out prior to final team selection)

=== IQA European Games 2022 (Limerick, Ireland) ===
The squad for the 2022 European Games was captained by Samantha Chittenden and coached by Nicola Gertler, Tim Scott, and Kim Govier.

Surname	First Name
Chittenden	Samantha (Captain)
Morton	Nathan (Vice-Captain)
Abey	Ajantha
Bell	Madeleine
Brenner	Max
Collins	Kelsey
Derrick	Luke
Gertler	Nicola
Hague	Gary
Hockey	Karysanne
Huang	Harry
Jones	Harrison
Lindley	Joshua
Mannering	Michelle
Mayling	Callum
Morton	Nathan
Rennie	Isobel
Sutherland	Jacob
Taylor	Kaitlin
Walker	Cameron
Walravens	Hannah
Vinet	Edward

Reserves
Baldeep Uppal
Caroline Crawford
Matt Tingle
Sanju Valrav

=== IQA World Cup 2018 (Florence, Italy) ===
The squad for the 2018 World Cup was captained by Callum Mayling and coached by Gen Gibson and Daniel Fox.

Surname	First Name
Mayling	Callum (Captain)
Andrew	Arlyta
Astalosh	Natalie
Culf	Andrew
Derrick	Luke
Frison	Brandon
Kemister	Neil
Menkhorst	Cassia
Merry	Emily
Morton	Nathan
Newton	Miles
O'Brien	Jonathon
Osborn	Dameon
Osmond	James
Rawson	Taya
Rodhouse	Dean
Round	Clementine
Spann	Simon
Tasman	Deni
van Kaathoven	Nikita
Williams	James

Reserves
Samantha Chittenden
Anthony Hogen
James Hyder
Harrison Jones
Rajtilak Kapoor
Stella Naylor
Isobel Rennie
Edward Vinet

=== IQA World Cup 2016 (Frankfurt, Germany) ===
The squad for the 2016 World Cup was captained by James Mortensen and coached by Gen Gibson.

Surname	First Name
Mortensen	James (Captain)
Allen	Nicholas
Astalosh	Natalie
Culf	Andrew
Derrick	Luke
Fox	Leslie (replaced Tash Keehan)
Growse	Jarrod
Keehan	Tash (named, withdrew due to injury)
Hyder	James
Kemister	Neil
Lee	Shu Ying
Mayling	Callum
Menkhorst	Cassia
Monty	Hannah
Morton	Nathan
Osborn	Dameon
Osmond	James
Rawson	Taya
Sneddon	Miles
Tasman	Deni
Thomas	Caitlin
Williams	James

Reserves
Samantha Chittenden
Oscar Cozens
Nicola Gertler
Carolyn Themel

=== IQA Global Games 2014 (Burnaby, Canada) ===
The squad for the 2014 World Cup was captained by James Hyder.

Surname	First Name	Number
Hyder	James	64 (Captain)
Bell	Dom	6
Berkowicz	Emmanuel	3
Brown	Cameron	8
Culf	Andrew	23
Derrick	Luke	21
Diep	Minh	9
Gordon	Rhiannon	88
Hunter	Katherine	1
Ingold-Dawes	Corey	2
Kapoor	Rajtilak	712
Monty	Hannah	10
Morton	Nathan	17
Osborn	Dameon	47
Osmond	James	15
Papadam	Arfy	22
Parker	Alli	4
Rawson	Taya	62
Stubberfield	Katelyn	13
Williams	James	32
Young	Shane	7

=== IQA Summer Games 2012 (Oxford, England) ===
The squad for the 2012 IQA Summer Games was captained by Katherine Hunter.

Surname	First Name
Hunter	Katherine (Captain)
Armstrong	Matt
Baum	Josh
Butera	Michael
Crane	Beth
Filippellp	Katie
Tucknott	Robbie
Washington	Sam

Note: This list is incomplete.

=== Most Caps ===
Caps	Player	Span
6	Luke Derrick	2014 - Present
6	Nathan Morton	2014 - Present
5	Samantha Chittenden*	2018 - Present
4	Harrison Jones*	2018 - 2025
4	Rajtilak Kapoor*^	2014 - Present
4	Callum Mayling	2016 - 2023
3	Natalie Astalosh	2016 - 2023
3	Madeleine Bell	2022 - Present
3	Max Brenner	2022 - Present
3	Kelsey Collins	2022 - 2025
3	Caroline Crawford*	2022 - Present
3	Andrew Culf	2014 - 2018
3	Brandon Frison	2018 - Present
3	Nicola Gertler*	2016 - 2023
3	James Hyder*	2014 - 2018
3	Joshua Lindley	2022 - 2025
3	Ava McConnell*^	2023 - 2025
3	Dameon Osborn	2014 - 2018
3	James Osmond	2014 - 2018
3	Taya Rawson	2014 - 2018
3	Isobel Rennie*	2018 - Present
3	Jakob Sutherland	2022 - Present
3	Edward Vienet*	2018 - 2023
3	Cameron Walker	2022 - Present
3	Hannah Walravens	2022 - Present
3	James Williams	2014 - 2018

*includes one or more appearances as a reserve

^includes one or more appearances as part of Aurora Australis

== See also ==
- Quadball in Australia
- Quidditch (sport)
- United States national quadball team
- International Quadball Association
- Sport in Australia
