= BQF =

BQF or bqf may refer to:

- Belgian Quidditch Federation, the governing body of quidditch in Belgium
- Black Quantum Futurism, a Philadelphian literary and artistic collective
- bqf, the ISO 639-3 code for Kaloum language (spurious), Guinea
