= United States national quadball team =

American sports team

US National Team
- Full name: United States National Team
- Nicknames: USNT
- Founded: 2005
- League: US Quadball
- Colours: Red, white and blue
- Head coach: Kennedy Murphy
- General manager: Hanna Reese
- Championships: IQA World Cup: 2012, 2014, 2018, 2023
- Website: usquadball.org/national-team/rosters

The United States national quadball team, previously known as US Quidditch, is the official quadball team of the United States. The team is regulated by US Quadball and is a national member of the International Quadball Association. The team has won the most IQA World Cup titles, winning the 2012, 2014, 2018, and 2023 titles. The USNT only competes in events once every two years; at the IQA World Cup, as it is geographically ineligible for the only other current international quadball event; the IQA European Games.

== History ==
The United States national team was formed in time for the 2012 Summer Games - the first Quidditch event to be contested by national teams. The event was held in the United Kingdom to coincide with the Torch Relay for the 2012 Olympic Games. The United States, who had invented the sport in 2005 at Middlebury College and who had been refining it for years before any other nation had taken it up, were heavy favorites. The tournament was contested between only five countries; the United States, United Kingdom, Canada, Australia and France of which only four had fully established Quidditch programs by that point: the United Kingdom had only a handful of teams and their squad was drawn from whichever players were available to attend. The tournament format consisted of a round robin of all five teams, after which the 5th placed team would be eliminated and the rest would contest the bracket. The United States went undefeated in the Round Robin, comfortably defeating every team and only being actively challenged on the scoreboard by France - who held them to two goals out of SWIM range before the USA caught the snitch to win 90–10. In bracket play the US beat Australia before defeating France again, this time by a very comfortable margin of 160–0 to win gold. Team USA also played a further exhibition match against hosts Team UK to coincide with the torch relay, which the US won 200–60.

The USA would defend their title in the second iteration of what is now the IQA World Cup; the 2014 IQA Global Games in Burnaby, Canada. The tournament had expanded to 7 teams from the original five, with Belgium and Mexico being added. Italy had planned to attend but were forced to drop out due to travel costs. The tournament format consisted of a round robin, followed by an immediate series of finals - removing the bracket from the previous tournament. The United States continued their comfortable winning streak, winning 5 of their round robin matches outright and benefitting from the voluntary forfeiture of the small and injury-laden Belgian team late into the day. This qualified the United States for the final, alongside second-placed Australia. The final was a whitewash, with the USA once again running out the comfortable victors in a shutout 230–0 victory.

The 2016 IQA World Cup in Frankfurt, Germany would prove a pivotal moment for the USNT. Heavy favorites once again, the USA took part in an event much-expanded from the previous iteration. With 23 competing nations following a veritable explosion in the sport's growth worldwide. Owing to travel difficulties in getting the national team together in one place to train, the USNT trained together for the first and only time the day before the tournament began, instead relying on the relatively dominant playstyle of their individual players and the chemistry built up by the waves of chasers and beaters who played for the same, or nearby, teams in US Quidditch and Major League Quidditch domestic games. The event followed a pool-play and bracket format, with the USA seeded into Pool 5 alongside Norway, Germany and Brazil - all nations who had begun competing internationally since the USA's last outing. The United States won the pool easily, dominating their opponents by wide margins. This preceded a comprehensive defeat of Catalonia 270–10 in the round of 16, which was itself followed by a much rockier beating of Belgium 130–50 in the Quarter Final. This match marked the only time the USA had been held close to SWIM since 2012 - once again being only two goals clear of range. The semi-final against the United Kingdom saw the USA fall 20–0 down rapidly, as the UK outplayed them in the opening stages of the game, spurred on by scores of fans who had travelled from Britain. This was not to last however, and the United States rapidly regained control of the match and ran out to an eventual 140–40 victory - though still a far cry from the dominant performances of years past. The final saw the United States play against Australia, a repeat of the 2014 final. Unlike the United States, the Australian team, 'The Dropbears' had arrived in Germany a week early and trained rigorously. Most of their players had been drawn from teams in and around Sydney and Melbourne and were all intimately familiar with each other. The final was extremely closely contested as a result, with neither side able to decisively outplay the other. A snitch catch by the USA's Margo Aleman was ruled out for a charge on the snitch, allowing Australia's Dameon Osbourne to catch the snitch, which won Australia the match, 150–130, and thus the tournament. This marked the first and, until 2025, only time the United States had ever lost a Quidditch match.

The 2018 IQA World Cup was held in Florence, Italy in July. The United States team, coached by 2012, 2014, and 2016 veteran Michael Parada and captained by Augustine Monroe (who played for the 2012 team), was composed largely of Texas and Massachusetts based players. The squad, whose marketing was dominated by the hashtag #RedeemTeam2018 won the gold medal, finishing 1st out of 29 teams. The US entered the tournament ranked #2 in the world, behind Australia. After finishing top of Group D they went into bracket play as the 3rd seed. In the quarterfinals the US met Australia, for a rematch of their 2016 finals loss. The United States won decisively 100*-30 before defeating the United Kingdom in the semi-finals. The final was played between the US and Belgium. The US prevailed with a scoreline of 120–70, ending with a snitch catch by United States seeker Harry Greenhouse.

The 2023 IQA World Cup was held in Richmond, Virginia, USA in July. The United States team was again coached by the 2012, 2014, and 2016 veteran Michael "Yada" Parada. The US entered the tournament ranked #1 in the world, and went undefeated in the tournament. In the finals, played against Germany, the US won 140–50, ending with a snitch catch by the US seeker Ryan Davis.

== Competitive record ==
Competition	Position
(United Kingdom) 2012 Summer Games	1st of 5
(Canada) 2014 Global Games	1st of 7
(Germany) 2016 World Cup	2nd of 21
(Italy) 2018 World Cup	1st of 29
(United States) 2019 Pan-American Games	1st of 4
(United States) 2023 World Cup	1st of 15

== Players ==
Where a player's club is listed, the information is accurate at the time of their representation for the event in question. The clubs listed in the 'current national squad' section are accurate for the current season. Where these names have changed over time, the name is given as the club is known now.

=== Current National Squad ===
This was the standing roster for the 2023 IQA World Cup in Richmond, Virginia in July 2023.

No.	Pos.	Surname	First Name	Club
11	B	Ayella-Silver	Rachel	The Warriors
53	C	Baer	Julia	Bosnyan Bearsharks
3	C	Baer-Benson	Henry	Twin Cities Quadball Club
17	B	Brown	Matt	Boom Train
66	C	Cole	Justin	Bosnyan Bearsharks
22	K	Crawford	Taylor	The Warriors
27	S	Davis	Ryan	Terminus Quadball Atlanta
2	C	Erwin	Kaci	Texas Cavalry
6	K	Esparza	Miguel	Texas Hill Country Heat
21	C	Fields	Bailee	Texas Hill Country Heat
25	K	Fried	Leo	Harvard Horntails
99	C	Gvozdenovic	Janko	The Warriors
49	S	Haggag	Mohammed	The Warriors
14	B	Havlin	Max	Boston Pandas
30	C	Heald	Rachel	Bosnyan Bearsharks
4	C	Jackson	Jon	The Warriors
23	C	Johnson	Josh	Texas Cavalry
12	B	Johnson (C)	Jackson	Texas Hill Country Heat
7	B	Kay	Tate	The Warriors
8	B	Kendall	Kobe	Anteaters Forever
34	C	Marella	Lindsay	The Warriors
26	C	Mayor	Athena	Boston Pandas
10	C	Monroe	Augustine	Texas Cavalry
15	B	Xu	Lulu	Boston Pandas
67	B	Monteiro	Serena	Boston Pandas
52	C	Murcek-Ellis	Darian	The Warriors
13	C	Persons	Emma	Twin Cities Quadball Club
13	B	Richard	Celine	Terminus Quadball Atlanta
0	K	Sanchez	Louis	Texas Cavalry
33	C	Scura	Ian	Boston Pandas
19	C	Trudeau	Tyler	Bosnyan Bearsharks
5	B	Williams	Daniel	Texas Hill Country Heat

== See also ==
- Australia national quadball team
- International Quidditch Association
- Quidditch (sport)
