= Hong Kong national quadball team =

Hong Kong
- Full name: Hong Kong National Quadball Team
- Founded: 2018
- Association: Hong Kong Quadball Association
- Head coach: Alex Lai Kwun Ho
- Website: hkquidditch.org

The Hong Kong national quadball team is the official national quadball team of Hong Kong.

== History ==
Quadball, initially formally known as quidditch, was introduced in Hong Kong as an organized sport in 2016 when the University of Hong Kong Quidditch Club was established by Lau Kwun-shing and his friends. They were joined by returning players from the United Kingdom. Quadball is based on the fictional sport of quidditch from the Harry Potter franchise.

In January 2018, the sole quidditch club in Hong Kong received funding from its parent university enabling it to organize friendlies with overseas-based teams but still experience struggles in attracting players due to the perceived strangeness of the nature of quidditch.

The club contributed six players for the Hong Kong national team at the 2018 Quidditch World Cup. It finished 25th out of 28 teams in its Quidditch World Cup debut.

In 2022, quidditch's name was formally changed to quadball by the now International Quadball Association. In the same year, Hong Kong guested at the 2022 European Games.

Hong Kong featured for at least two more editions of the Qudditch World Cup, now known as the IQA World Cup in 2023 and 2025.

== Competitive records ==
=== IQA World Cup ===
IQA World Cup record
Year	Position	Ref.
(Italy) 2018	25th place	
(United States) 2023	13th place	
(Belgium) 2025	29th place	
Total	3/6	–

=== European Games ===
European Games record
Year	Position	Ref.
(Republic of Ireland) 2022	19th place	
Total	1/5	–

== Head coaches ==
Name	Tournament(s)	Ref.
(Hong Kong) Samuel Hunters Baxter	2018 Quidditch World Cup	
(Hong Kong) Fraser Posford	2022 IQA European Games; 2023 IQA World Cup	
(Hong Kong) Alex Lai Kwun Ho	2025 IQA World Cup	
