= IQA World Cup =

International quidditch tournament

- Current season, competition or edition: 2027 IQA World Cup
- Formerly: Summer Games; Global Games
- Sport: Quadball/Quidditch
- Founded: 2012
- First season: 2012 IQA Summer Games
- Organising body: IQA
- No. of teams: Varies
- Most recent champions: Belgium (1 title)
- Most titles: United States (4 titles)
- Website: iqasport.org

The IQA World Cup is an international quidditch tournament contested by the national teams of the members of the International Quidditch Association, the sport's global governing organisation. The championship, which was named Summer Games and Global Games in its first two editions, has been awarded every two years since 2012. The current champions are Belgium, winning their final game against Germany, with Australia coming in third against the United States.

== History ==
Locations of the IQA World Cups

The World Cup was first held in July 2012. The tournament was named the "Summer Games" in accordance with its unofficial tie-in to the 2012 Summer Olympics, and because the name "World Cup" was already being used since 2007 for a club championship held in the United States. The tournament was held in Oxford, United Kingdom as the Olympic torch was passing through the city. Five teams participated: Australia, Canada, France, the United Kingdom, and the United States. The event followed a round-robin format, with the lowest ranked team being eliminated and the others advancing to the bracket phase. The UK was defeated by all other competitors and did not make the bracket. The US took first place, defeating France in the final, and Australia claimed bronze by defeating Canada.

In 2014, the tournament was renamed "Global Games" and took place under an updated IQA which became an international sports federation. The Games were under the supervision of US Quidditch but were held in Burnaby, British Columbia, Canada. Seven teams came out to compete: Australia, Belgium, Canada, France, Mexico, the United Kingdom, and the United States. Italy had planned to compete but had to pull out. The event was contested over a round-robin, with positions in a series of playoffs determined by each team's result in the first round. Due to limited media relations and improper planning, the tournament was relatively unknown and had a lacking medical staff which became evident when Belgium chose to forfeit after suffering multiple injuries. The United States defended their title by defeating Australia in the final, and Canada claimed bronze by defeating the United Kingdom.

The 2016 World Cup took place in Frankfurt, Germany. The initial tournament plan involved 24 competing teams, but because of the dropouts of five teams, the number of expected nations was reduced to 19. Later, Brazil and Slovakia were added to the roster of teams, resulting in a field of 21 nations. The tournament took place using a pool-play format, followed by a single-elimination bracket with all 21 teams. Ahead of the tournament, exhibition matches were held between Canada and the United Kingdom, Turkey and Mexico and Australia and Germany. After a pool-play and bracket tournament, Australia defeated the United States 150*–130 in the final. The United States had first made a snitch catch which was disallowed on the grounds of charging the snitch. When the Australian seeker caught the snitch, the catch was initially challenged due to the seeker having been hit by a bludger. However the beat was ruled out as the beater had himself been hit by a bludger. The catch was therefore called good and Australia won the match and the United States suffered their first defeat. In the third place match, the United Kingdom avenged their defeat in the 2014 third place playoff years prior by beating Canada 190*–60. Both the final and bronze playoff were therefore re-runs of the same games from the previous World Cup, both with the reverse result.

The 2018 World Cup was held in Florence, Italy with 29 teams competing. There has been much online controversy about the unexpected hike in tournament fees, which has forced some smaller nations to drop out, namely Denmark and Sweden, both of whom would have been attending for the first time.

=== 2023 World Cup ===
The next edition of the World Cup was supposed to be held in 2020 but was postponed due to the COVID-19 pandemic. The tournament was eventually held in 2023 for the first time since quidditch was renamed as quadball in 2022.

=== 2025 World Cup ===
On the 15th of October 2024, it was announced that the 2025 World cup would be held in Tubize, Belgium with 31 teams participating. The tournament was hosted in Proximus-Basecamp, with the third place play-off and the final taking at the 8,000 capacity, Stade Edmond Leburton. Initially, it was planned to hold the final on an indoor pitch at Proximus-Basecamp, labelled Pitch 1 during the event, however due to unprecedented demand for tickets, a larger venue was selected. Pitch 1 was the subject of controversy during the event. Unlike the rest of the pitches, which used synthetic AstroTurf, the indoor pitch was much firmer and more akin to a futsal pitch. This resulted in a number of injuries and teams refusing to play on the pitch. This was resolved by moving the pitch outside, alongside the others used at the tournament.

The tournament itself provided some shock results. 4-time champions, the USA were knocked out at the Semi-Finals by European Champions Germany. European Finalists England were knocked out in the Quarter-Finals by hosts Belgium, whom advanced to the final, beating Australia in the other Semi. The Third place playoff was a tightly contested game, watched by a bumper crowd. Australia took to an early lead, but were quickly caught by the US. The game remained close into the 20th minute, when the flag entered the pitch. With the Score at US 80-60 AUS, the Australian seeker caught the flag within 7 seconds, giving Australia the win (90*-80) and the bronze medal. This was followed by an all European final, between Belgium and Germany. Another highly contested and close game, with both teams having flag-catches ruled out, Belgium were the eventual winners 170*-90, becoming the first European team to win the World Cup, as well as doing so in front of a home crowd.

=== 2027 World Cup ===
On the 31st May 2026, It was announced that the 2027 IQA world cup was to be held at Barn Elms Sport Centre in London. The tournament will take place between 23 and 25 July 2027. With this, London becomes the first city to host both a European Games and a World Cup. The United Kingdom also becomes the first country to host 2 World Cups.

=== 2029 World Cup ===
On the 26th March 2026, the IQA announced Calgary and Fukushima (city) as the finalists to host the 2029 tournament. On the 22nd August 2026, it was confirmed that Fukushima would host the 2029 World Cup between the 11-13 May 2029. This will be the first World Cup to be hosted outside of Europe or North America.

== Format ==
=== Qualification ===
None of the competitions so far have involved a qualification round. To be eligible, the team must be representing a region's national governing body.

==== 2025 Format ====
31 Teams were divided into seven groups. 3 of the groups had 5 teams, with the remaining 4 having 4 teams. The 5 team groups play each of the other 4 teams within their group in a round-robin format, whilst the 4 team groups play every team within another 4 team group (e.g. pool 4 plays against all the teams in pool 5, with pool 6 playing against all the teams in pool 7). These group games set the seedings for the knockout bracket. The team with the highest seeding following the group stage is given a Bye, with the remaining 30 teams entering a round of 30 knockout stage. This winners bracket will follow a single elimination system, culminating in the final. Any teams eliminated will compete in either mini-consolation brackets or round robin play against other eliminated teams in order to set position 4th-31st.

== Results ==
The following table shows a list of all World Cups to date. The team that caught the snitch is denoted with an asterisk.

Year	Host city	Final			3rd place match			Teams
Year	Host city	Champions	Score	Runners-up	3rd place	Score	4th place	Teams
2012; Details	(United Kingdom); Oxford	United States	160*–0	France	Australia	60*–50	Canada	5
2014; Details	(Canada); Burnaby (Note: The 2014 Global Games were held in Canada but officially hosted by US Quidditch.)	United States	210*–0	Australia	Canada	70*–40	United Kingdom	7
2016; Details	(Germany); Frankfurt	Australia	150*–130	United States	United Kingdom	190*–60	Canada	21
2018; Details	(Italy); Florence	United States	120*–70	Belgium	Turkey	110*–60	United Kingdom	29
2023; Details	(United States); Richmond	United States	140*–50	Germany	Belgium	120*–60	England	15
2025; Details	(Belgium); Tubize	Belgium	170*–90	Germany	Australia	90*–80	United States	31
2027 Details	(England) London	TBD	TBD	TBD	TBD	TBD	TBD	TBD
2029 Details	(Japan) Fukushima	TBD	TBD	TBD	TBD	TBD	TBD	TBD

== Medals summary ==
Rank	Nation	Gold	Silver	Bronze	Total
1	United States	4	1	0	5
2	Australia	1	1	2	4
3	Belgium	1	1	1	3
4	Germany	0	2	0	2
5	France	0	1	0	1
6	Canada	0	0	1	1
6	Turkey	0	0	1	1
6	United Kingdom	0	0	1	1
Totals (8 entries)		6	6	6	18

== Appearance ==
Team	(United Kingdom) 2012 (5)	(Canada) 2014 (7)	(Germany) 2016 (21)	(Italy) 2018 (29)	(United States) 2023 (15)	(Belgium) 2025 (31)	Total
African Nations	•	•	•	•	5th	10th	2
Australia	3rd	2nd	1st	5th	6th	3rd	6
Austria	•	•	14th	11th	13th	8th	4
Belgium	•	7th	7th	2nd	3rd	1st	5
Basque Country	•	•	•	•	•	22nd	1
Brazil	•	•	16th	27th	9th	17th	4
Canada	4th	3rd	4th	9th	8th	13th	6
Catalonia	•	•	12th	17th	•	25th	3
Czech Republic	•	•	•	15th	•	30th	2
England	•	•	•	•	4th	5th	2
Finland	•	•	•	28th	•	•	1
France	2nd	6th	5th	6th	7th	6th	6
Germany	•	•	11th	7th	2nd	2nd	4
Hong Kong	•	•	•	25th	13th	29th	3
Iceland	•	•	•	29th	•	•	1
India	•	•	•	•	9th	9th	2
Ireland	•	•	20th	21st	•	19th	3
Italy	•	•	13th	8th	•	21st	3
Japan	•	•	•	•	11th	12th	2
Malaysia	•	•	•	18th	•	•	1
Mexico	•	5th	8th	13th	11th	16th	5
Netherlands	•	•	18th	19th	•	27th	3
New Zealand	•	•	•	20th	•	•	1
Norway	•	•	9th	11th	13th	7th	4
Philippines	•	•	•	•	•	20th	1
Poland	•	•	19th	13th	•	28th	3
Scotland	•	•	•	•	•	23rd	1
Slovakia	•	•	17th	26th	•	•	2
Slovenia	•	•	15th	21st	•	18th	3
South Korea	•	•	21st	23rd	•	•	2
Spain	•	•	10th	10th	•	11th	3
Switzerland	•	•	•	23rd	•	31st	2
Turkey	•	•	6th	3rd	•	15th	3
United Kingdom	5th	4th	3rd	4th	•	•	4
United States	1st	1st	2nd	1st	1st	4th	6
Vietnam	•	•	•	15th	•	24th	2
Wales	•	•	•	•	•	26th	1

Legend

- 1st – Champions
- 2nd – Runners-up
- 3rd – Third place
- 4th – Fourth place
- • – Did not enter / Did not qualify
- – Hosts
- Q – Qualified for forthcoming tournament
- WD – Withdrew from the tournament

== See also ==
- International Quidditch Association
- Quidditch (sport)
- European Games (quidditch)
