= 2014 IQA Global Games =

International sport event

IQA Global Games
- 2014
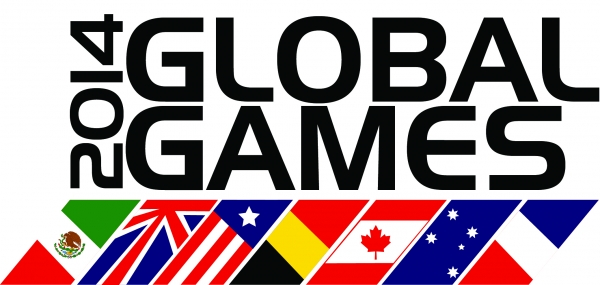

Tournament information
- Sport: Quidditch
- Location: Burnaby, Canada
- Dates: 19–20 July 2014
- Administrator: International Quidditch Association
- Tournament format(s): Pool play Single elimination bracket
- Host(s): US Quidditch
- Teams: 7

Final positions
- Champion: United States
- 1st runner-up: Australia
- 2nd runner-up: Canada

Tournament statistics
- Matches played: 31
- Points scored: 4220 (136.13 per match)
- SWIM: 3

The 2014 IQA World Cup, known at the time as the Global Games, was the second edition of the international team quidditch championship. It was played in Burnaby, Canada, and the United States won the tournament for the second time in a row, winning 210*–0 over Australia in the final.

== Participating teams ==
Burnaby, Canada

Team	Previous appearances in tournament (Note: Bold: winner, Italics: host.)
Australia	1 (2012)
Belgium	
Canada (host)	1 (2012)
France	1 (2012)
Mexico	
United Kingdom	1 (2012)
United States	1 (2012)

== Group stage ==
Pos	Team	W	L	QPD	SWIM	Qualification	(Mexico)	(Belgium)	(France)	(United Kingdom)	(Canada)	(Australia)	
1	United States	7	0	+890	0	Qualify for final	150*–ff	250*–20	220*–10	150*–0	130–70*	130*–20	140*-50
2	Australia	6	1	+450	1	Qualify for final	160*–0	160–90* ot	140–70*	80–50*	70*–40	120*-50	
3	Canada	5	2	+440	0	Qualify for third place play-off	70–30*	170*–20	230*–10	100*–20	300*-200		
4	United Kingdom	4	3	−40	0	Qualify for third place play-off	90*–20	130*–50	140*–40	170*-140			
5	Mexico	3	4	−420	0	Qualify for fifth place play-off	110*–60	140*-80					
6	France	2	5	−430	0	Qualify for fifth place play-off	140*–60	160*-150					
7	Belgium	1	6	−440	0	7th	120*–60						

== Final stage ==
Champion Runner-up Third place Participant

Fifth place play-off
Mexico	90*–80	France
Third place play-off
Canada	70*–40	United Kingdom
Final
United States	210*–0	Australia

== Final ranking ==
Rank	Team
1st place, gold medalist(s)	United States
2nd place, silver medalist(s)	Australia
3rd place, bronze medalist(s)	Canada
4	United Kingdom
5	Mexico
6	France
7	Belgium
