= Belgian Quidditch Federation =

National Quidditch federation

Belgian Quadball Federation
- Abbreviation: BQF
- Formation: 5 July 2012 (14 years ago)
- Type: National governing body (NGB)
- Legal status: Non-profit organisation, in progress
- Headquarters: Antwerp, Belgium
- Official language: English (de facto), Dutch, French and German
- Parent organization: International Quidditch Association
- Website: www.quidditchbelgium.be
- Formerly called: Belgium Muggle Quidditch (BMQ), Belgian Quidditch Federation (BQF)

Belgian Quadball Federation (French: Fédération belge de quadbal; Dutch: Belgische Quadball Federatie), or BQF, is the governing body of quadball in Belgium. It was founded in 2012 as a Facebook page to garner interest from potential players and teams within Belgium and began to take shape in 2013 with the introduction of its first two teams: Deurne Dodo's and the Brussels Qwaffles. The organisation began to take shape as a non-profit (French: ASBL; Dutch: VZW) in early 2014 with the formation of the newly-international International Quidditch Association in the form an international federation. On 10 October 2014, BQF changed its name from Belgium Muggle Quidditch to its current name to better integrate with other sports in the country.

== History ==
Belgian Quidditch Federation began in 2012 as a Facebook page, Belgium Muggle Quidditch. In 2013, Belgium saw the foundation of its two inaugural teams: Antwerp Quidditch Club and Brussels Qwaffles. Soon the first couple tournaments came to Belgium: Brussels Muscles, an international tournament and European Quidditch Cup 2014, the regional qualifier tournament for 2014 IQA (Club) World Cup.

Following its major events, BQF became a major force in the IQA's transition into a sports federation. With the IQA's release, Belgium as a member of Quidditch Europe was granted one delegate within the IQA Congress alongside the Netherlands' one. Moreover, BQF sent its national team, the Belgian Gryffins to the flagship tournament of the IQA: Global Games 2014. In 2015, Belgian Gryffins participated in the IQA European Games in Sarteano, Italy. In 2016, Belgian Gryffins competed in IQA World Cup 2016 in Frankfurt. The year after, the team participated in 2017 European Games in Oslo. In 2018, Belgian Gryffins competed at IQA World Cup 2018, Firenze, gaining their first major medal at an international event.

Not too long after the founding of the two first clubs, several clubs started to grow within Belgium. Belgium currently has several team. Aside from personal growth, Belgium has grown as strong quidditch country, being home to the 4 time European Club Champion Antwerp Quadball Club.

== Competitions ==
BQF hosts their own national league, the Belgian Quadball League. Depending on the European algorithm, clubs can qualify for the European Quidditch Cup, based on their position in the league.

Being a part of the International Quadball Association, Belgium sends its national team, the Belgian Gryffins, to the IQA World Cup (formerly known as the IQA Global Games), a tournament held biennially.

== National team ==
BQF also hosts a national team, the Belgian Gryffins. They made their debut at the 2014 IQA Global Games in Vancouver, B.C., Canada on 19 July 2014. Due to lack of resources for the country's best players to make it to Vancouver and the limited roster available, Team Belgium came in seventh of seven place at the Games, ultimately forfeiting their final match against the USA due to numerous injuries the team faced.

As of 2025, the Belgian Gryffins are one of the most successful national teams in IQA World Cup history, winning silver in 2018, bronze in 2023 and gold in 2025.

== See also ==
- Muggle quidditch
- International Quidditch Association
- Sport in Belgium
