= Canada national quidditch team =

National sports team

Team Canada
- Full name: Canada National Quidditch Team
- Founded: 2012
- League: Quidditch Canada
- Colours: Black, white and red
- Head coach: Michael Howard, Ittaana Krow (Ass. Coach)
- Championships: 2014 Global Games
- Website: Quidditch Canada Facebook Page

Uniforms

The Canadian national quidditch team made its debut in 2012 at the IQA Summer Games in Oxford, UK, where it placed 4th of five teams. The team once again represented Canada at the 2014 IQA Global Games in Burnaby, BC on July 29, 2014 where it took third place, coming behind the United States and Australia, respectively.

== History ==
The national team made its debut in 2012 at the International Quidditch Association (IQA) Summer Games in Oxford, UK. The team featured players from Ontario, British Columbia, and Québec. The team was created just two months before the championships and thus had no tryouts and was composed of players who were able to travel to the UK to compete. The tournament format began with a round-robin between all five participating teams (USA, Canada, France, Australia, and the UK) and then a ranked bracket. After the round-robin, Team Canada was seeded second; however, after back-to-back losses to France and Australia, they fell to fourth place.

The selection process for the 2014 Global Games involved rigorous tryouts for potential players. Tryouts saw 74 potential candidates between video submissions and two tryouts: one in Eastern Canada in Kingston, ON and one in Western Canada in Vancouver, BC. Players who were unable to attend either the East or West try-outs were able to submit video tryouts. The selected team features players from a variety of backgrounds and university teams, notably University of British Columbia, University of Ottawa, University of Toronto, Université de Montréal, McGill University, Queen's University, Carleton University, Tufts College, and Kansas University.

The 2014 Canadian national team competed on July 19, 2014 at the Burnaby Lake sports complex in Burnaby, British Columbia against 5 other announced national teams: Belgium, Italy, Australia, the UK, and the USA. The Global Games is a biennial event run by the International Quidditch Association that, unlike regular-season IQA games, features national teams from quidditch-playing nations instead of collegiate or community teams. Canada took third place in the 2014 IQA Global Games following the United States and Australia, respectively.

== Roster and coaches ==
=== 2019 ===
2019 Panams Games - Eastern Regional Team
Number	Pos.	Player	Team
16	C/S	Alex Naftel	Valhalla Quidditch
18	K/C	Andrew Kusters	Valhalla Quidditch
3	B	Arjun Patel	Valfreyja Quidditch
9	K	Bryan Melchior	Ottawa Otters
1	K/S	Cayden Peixoto	Ottawa Otters
32	B/S	Christos Kaldis	Ottawa Otters
7	C	Derek Taylor	Valfreyja Quidditch
79	C	Emily Naftel	Carleton Quidditch
67	C	Guillaume Hamelin	Université de Montréal
4	C	Hailey Yhap	Ottawa Otters
19	B	Heather Nakanishi	Carleton Quidditch
44	C/S	Jeremy Burrows-Balka	University of Guelph Gryphons
11	C	Karen Douglas	Ottawa Otters
13	B	Martin Chiasson	Ottawa Otters
94	C	Michael Beda	Valhalla Quidditch
45	B/S	Michael Gomes	University of Guelph Gryphons
20	C	Michael Wanless	Université de Montréal
22	C	Nathan Reid	Ottawa Otters
27	B	Rachel Fabbri	Ottawa Otters
5	B	Samantha McCaul	Valhalla Quidditch
26	C	Yara Kodershah	Valhalla Quidditch
55	B	Zac MacDonald	University of Guelph Gryphons
70	C	Zoe Mastellotto	Valhalla Quidditch

2019 Panams Games - Western Regional Team
Number	Pos.	Player	Team
76	C/K/S	Austin Wallace	Vancouver Stormcrows
88	C	Katie Olfert	Vancouver Stormcrows
96	B	Nathan Christopher Unrau	Vancouver Stormcrows
91	B	Cait Woolner	Vancouver Stormcrows
23	B	Cayley Mendoza	Edmonton Aurors
33	C	Soleil Heaney	Edmonton Aurors
36	C	Chris Radojewski	Edmonton Aurors
8	K/S	Wyatt Verchere	University of British Columbia Thunderbirds Sports Club
85	B	Colin Crowe	Edmonton Aurors
93	C	Jane Arnett	Valhalla Quidditch
80	K	Brian Gallaway	Edmonton Aurors
47	C	Alim Ismail	Edmonton Aurors
10	C	Kraig Yeh	Vancouver Stormcrows
63	B	Nathan Ross	SFU
7	C	Jessyka Schwandt	Vancouver Stormcrows
15	K	Mathias Wienicke	Vancouver Vipertooths
20	C	Julian Cowden	University of Victoria Valkyries
2	C	Megan Hirst	Edmonton Aurors
25	B	Taylor Attrill	Vancouver Stormcrows

=== 2018 ===
For the 2018 IQA World Cup in Florence, Italy, the Canadian National Quidditch team had a change of leadership in which Michael Howard (Valhalla Quidditch formerly, uOttawa Quidditch) took over as head captain and Rachel Malone was retained as an assistant coach and former National Team beater Mathew McVeigh joined as the second assistant coach. In addition Brian galloway served as team coordinator and Bethan Morgan, Jill Staniec, and Lisa Tubb served as National team Fundraising Lead, National Team Manager, National Team Communication Lead respectively. The Canadian team was placed in Group E with Malaysia, Germany, and Iceland. Gieven their grouping they competed the teams in Group F: Norway, New Zealand, Spain, and Switzerland. In these four games against the teams in Group F, Canada finished 3-1 beating Switzerland 200*-0, Norway 120*-80, and New Zealand 240*-0 while losing to Spain 50-70*. Canada finished Day 1 in 9th place pitting them in a matchup against the 8th seeded Turkey, which ended with a 130*-110 Turkey victory. Following this loss, Canada's title chances were dashed but they proceeded through the Consolation brackets with wins against the Czech Republic, Norway and a redemption win against Spain to close out the tournament with a final seeding of 9th place.

2018 IQA World Cup
Number	Pos.	Player	Team
15	C	Matt Bourassa	Valfreyja Quidditch
17	B	Katie Brown	Valhalla Quidditch
44	C/S	Jeremy Burrows-Balka	University of Guelph Gryphons
13	B	Martin Chiasson	University of Ottawa Gee-Gees
11	C/S	Karen Douglas	University of Ottawa Gee-Gees
3	C	Lynden Evers	Valhalla Quidditch
14	C	Robyn Fortune	McGill University
7	B	Jonathan Golla	Valhalla Quidditch
57	C	Brock Lowery	University of Waterloo Ridgebacks
91	K/C	Joel Martens	Calgary Mavericks
24	C/K	Ittaana Krow	Valhalla Quidditch
18	K	Andrew Kusters	Queen's University
89	B	Piotr Makuch	Valhalla Quidditch
5	B	Samantha McCaul	Queen's University
6	B	Erin McCrady	Valhalla Quidditch
16	C/S	Alex Naftel	Carleton Ravens
34	K	James Neuman	Edmonton Aurors
2	C	Nina Patti	University of Ottawa Gee-Gees
88	C	Katie Olfert	University of British Columbia Thunderbirds Sports Club
36	C	Christopher Radojewski	Edmonton Aurors
0	B	Raphael Roy-Laurore	uOttawa Quidditch
1	K	Denver Staines	University of Guelph Gryphons
9	C	Claire Steckle	Valfreyja Quidditch
71	B/C	Jessalynn Tsang	Valhalla Quidditch
10	B	Tyson Worrall	Valhalla Quidditch

=== 2016 ===
For the 2016 IQA World Cup in Frankfurt Germany, the Canadian National Quidditch team had a change of leadership in which Chris Radojewski (Alberta Clippers Quidditch) took over as head captain and Matthew Bourassa (Carleton Quidditch) and Paul Gour (Dalhousie Quidditch) were selected as Assistant Coaches. For medical reasons Paul Gour was unable to travel with the team and was replaced by Alternate Roster member Rachel Malone and served as speaking captain. Jessalynn Tsang (Valhalla Quidditch, Queen's University Quidditch) served as the National Team Manager. The Canadian team finished 4th losing to Australia 80*-40 in the semis finals and the United Kingdom in the bronze match 190*-60.

2016 IQA World Cup
Number	Pos.	Player	Hometown	Team
15	C	Matt Bourassa	Grande Prairie, AB	Carleton University
17	B	Katie Brown	Ottawa, ON	University of Waterloo Ridgebacks
13	B	Martin Chiasson	Dieppe, NB	University of Ottawa Gee-Gees
30	C	Cameron Cutler	Southlake, TX	UBC Thunderbirds
42	C	Devin Dutt	Whitby, ON	Carleton University
27	C	Michelle Ferguson	Ottawa, ON	University of Ottawa Gee-Gees
14	C	Robyn Fortune	Whitehorse, YT	McGill University
7	K	Jonathan Golla	Mississauga, ON	University of Waterloo Ridgebacks
2	C	Steven Kimball	Lindsay, ON	University of Ottawa Gee-Gees
24	K	Ittaana Krow	Toronto, ON	Valhalla Quidditch
18	K	Andrew Kusters	Oakville, ON	Queen's University
12	B	Mathew McVeigh	Kemptville, ON	University of Ottawa Gee-Gees
6	B	Erin McCrady	London, ON	University of Ottawa Gee-Gees
16	S	Alex Naftel	Ottawa, ON	Carleton Ravens
16	S	Gordon Noel	Vancouver, BC	McGill Quidditch
19	C	Jonathan Parent	Kingston, ON	University of Ottawa Gee-Gees
36	C	Christopher Radojewski	Brantford, ON	Alberta Clippers Quidditch Club
77	B	Raphael Roy-Laurore	Montréal, QC	Université de Montréal
9	C	Claire Steckle	Ottawa, ON	University of Ottawa Gee-Gees
41	B	Ema Shiroma-Chao	Burnaby, BC	Université de Montréal
76	S	Austin Wallace	Shawnigan Lake, BC	UBC Thunderbirds

=== 2014 ===
The 2014 team coaches were selected by IQA Canadian Director Tegan Bridge after an application process. Hugh Podmore of Valhalla Quidditch was selected as Head Coach, and Rebecca Alley of the University of Ottawa GeeGees was chosen as Assistant Coach. The roster for the 2014 Global Games was announced on May 18, 2014.

2014 Global Games
No.	Pos.	Player	Hometown	Team
8	B	Sarah Basciano	Oakville, ON	University of Toronto
15	C	Matt Bourassa	Grande Prairie, AB	Carleton University
91	B	Jon Braun	Woodlawn, ON	UBC Thunderbirds
42	C	Devin Dutt	Whitby, ON	Carleton University
25	C	Michelle Ferguson	Ottawa, ON	University of Ottawa Gee-Gees
14	C	Robyn Fortune	Whitehorse, YT	McGill University
22	S	Alexander Graham	North York, ON	Valhalla
18	K	Andrew Kusters	Oakville, ON	Queen's University
1	C	Louis Leung	Vancouver, BC	UBC Thunderbirds
12	B	Mathew McVeigh	Kemptville, ON	University of Ottawa Gee-Gees
32	C	Rithy Min	Montréal, QC	Université de Montréal
33	B	Samy Mousa	Pickering, ON	University of Kansas
0	K	Adam Palmer	Whitby, ON	York University
19	C	Jonathan Parent	Kingston, ON	University of Ottawa Gee-Gees
7	K	Hugh Podmore	White Rock, BC	Valhalla
36	C	Christopher Radojewski	Brantford, ON	Queen's University
93	S	Adam Robillard	Ottawa, ON	University of Ottawa Gee-Gees
27	B	Arlene Rosenberg	Montréal, QC	Tufts College
11	C	Alexa Rowe	Sydney, Australia	UBC Thunderbirds
41	B	Ema Shiroma-Chao	Burnaby, BC	Université de Montréal
23	K	Matthew Stone	Sydenham, ON	Carleton University
94	C	Brian Wong	Langley, BC	Ottawa Maple Rush

2014 Global Games Alternative Roster
No.	Pos.	Player	Hometown	Team
20	B	Alexandra Bassa	Windsor, ON	uOttawa Gee-Gees
13	C	Matthew Bunn	Barrie, ON	uOttawa Gee-Gees
3	C	Wesley Burbidge	Utopia, ON	University of Guelph
9	B	Martin Chiasson	Dieppe, NB	uOttawa Gee-Gees
88	C	Tiffany Croteau	Ottawa, ON	uOttawa Gee-Gees
92	C	Robert Halas	Kamloops, BC	UBC Thunderbirds

There was no selection process for the 2012 team, which was composed largely of individuals who were able and willing to travel to Oxford, England, to play.

2012 IQA Summer Games Roster
Pos.	Player	Team
B/C	Tegan Bridge	uOttawa Quidditch
C	Derek Burrows	McGill University Quidditch
B	Benjamin Carlisle	McGill University Quidditch
B	David Danos	UBC Thunderbirds
B/C/S	Alain Desroches	McGill University Quidditch
K	Steven Foster	University of Victoria
B	Caitlin MacLeod	University of Toronto
C	Drew Marubashi	Queen's University Quidditch
K	Jamie Lafrance	uOttawa Quidditch
S	Plunger Pârvulescu	McGill University Quidditch
B	Leila Quigley	University of Victoria
C	Adam Robillard	uOttawa Quidditch
C	Mason Silviera	Queen's University Quidditch
B	Mary Warner	University of Victoria

== Jerseys ==
The 2012 Summer Games jerseys were designed by David Danos. After the games, they were discontinued due to their similarity to Hockey Canada's logo.

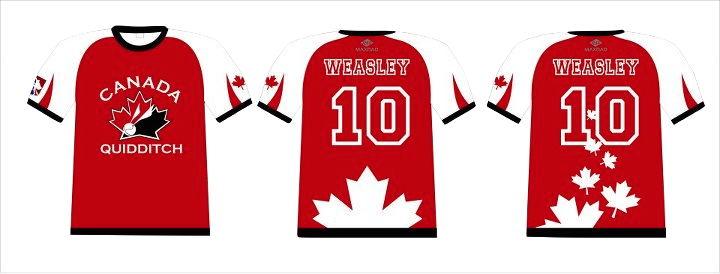

Quidditch Canada announced on May 29, 2014 that Adam Robillard's jersey submission had been selected featuring a stylized maple leaf on a black background.

== Competitive record ==
Team Canada made their debut at the 2012 IQA Summer Games, where they placed fourth of five teams. Due to how the team was chosen (those who could afford to make it over having try-outs) and the fact that the team had a smaller roster of newer players, the Canadian team had difficulties keeping pace with the other teams toward the end of the day. However, only Team France and Team USA posed formidable threats to the Canadian team, whereas the loss against Team Australia was due to a withering team and a lost snitch catch in the end.

At the 2014 IQA Global Games, however, Team Canada was a favoured team. Ultimately, Team Canada lost against both the US and Australia, coming close in the game against Team Australia, ending in third place.

2014 Global Games
Opposing Team	Winning Team	GF	GA	SC	MM:SS
Team Mexico	(Mexico)	70	150	(Mexico)	24:00
Team Canada	(Canada)	30	70	(Belgium)	18:19
(United Kingdom) Team UK	(United Kingdom)	50	90	(Belgium)	14:31
Team Australia	(Australia)	0	160	(Australia)	20:00
Team France	(France)	60	140	(Belgium)	-**
(United States) Team USA	(United States)	0	150	-*	00:00

* Indicates that that was forfeited with a 150*-0 loss.

** Indicates unknown game time.

2012 Summer Games
Opposing Team	Winning Team	GF	GA	SC	MM:SS
Team Mexico	(Mexico)	70	150	(Mexico)	24:00
Team Canada	(Canada)	30	70	(Belgium)	18:19
(United Kingdom) Team UK	(United Kingdom)	50	90	(Belgium)	14:31
Team Australia	(Australia)	0	160	(Australia)	20:00
Team France	(France)	60	140	(Belgium)	-**
(United States) Team USA	(United States)	0	150	-*	00:00

* Indicates that that was forfeited with a 150*-0 loss.

** Indicates unknown game time.

== See also ==
- Quidditch Canada
- International Quidditch Association
- Sport in Canada
