= Belgium national quidditch team =

National sports team

Belgian Gryffins
- Full name: Belgium National Quadball Team
- Nicknames: Belgian Gryffins
- Founded: 2014
- First season: Belgium 150*-80 Mexico (Burnaby, Canada; 19 July 2014)
- Association: Belgian Quidditch Federation
- League: IQA
- Colours: Black, gold and red
- Championships: 2015 European Games; 2014 Global Games
- Website: Belgian Gryffins Facebook Page

The Belgium national quidditch team, also known as the Belgian Gryffins (Dutch: Belgische Gryffioenen; French: Gryffons Belges; German: Belgischen Greyfen), is the national team of Belgium in quidditch. The team was founded in 2014 upon the announcement of the 2014 IQA Global Games, the International Quidditch Association's second international tournament featuring national teams.

The team is overseen by the Belgian Quidditch Federation, the head organisation of all quidditch in Belgium. The name Gryffins and the logo come from the combination of Belgium's two community's symbols: the Walloon cock and the Flemish lion.

== History ==
The Gryffins were founded in 2014 under the guiding of Canadian David Danos at the announcement of the 2014 Global Games in Burnaby, B.C., Canada. As Belgium's quidditch scene was young and developing, unlike other nations, there were no try-outs for the 2014 team. The decision for who went rested on the individual player's ability to fund themselves. The Gryffins held a crowd-funding campaign through Indiegogo where they raised nearly €1000 of the €8000 needed and were keeping a social media presence through their Facebook and Twitter pages.

After appearing at the European Games in Sarteano, Italy (July 2015), and ranking fourth in Europe, the Gryffins will once again compete in a worldwide event at World Cup 2016 in Frankfurt.

== Colours ==
The Belgian tricolore flag

The colours of the team have always been that of the Belgium tricolore, red, gold and black. Since in quidditch it is illegal to sport a jersey primarily with yellow due to confusion with snitches, the primary colours are always red or black with yellow as a flair.

=== Jersey History ===
The design of the 2014 jerseys were put through a popular vote open to any interested Belgian quidditch player. The majority chose the option created by Julie-Anne Weber, who designed the paw, and Cory Faniel, who dealt with the colour layout.

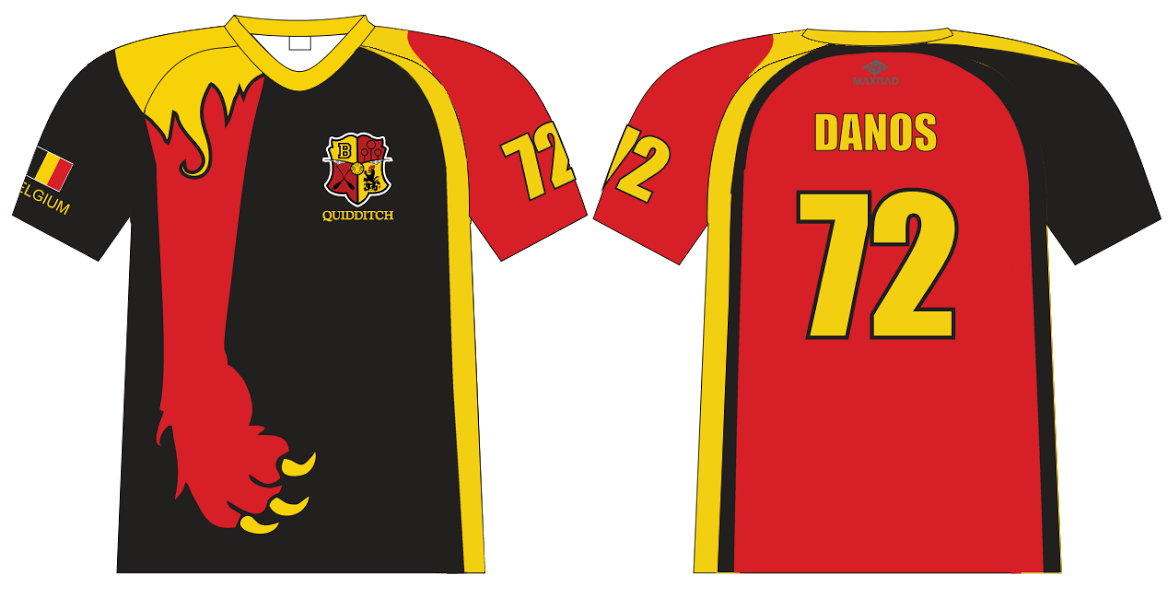

In November 2014, a popular vote ranked the Gryffins' jersey among the five best quidditch team uniforms in the world, according to the readers of The Quidditch Post. A jury of editors graded each submission and, after aggregating the score of popular and jury votes, Belgium was awarded the title of World's Best Quidditch Uniform for the jersey design displayed above.

In 2015, the decision was made to maintain a similar design for the European Games jersey, though a change in provider resulted in some necessary tweaking.

== Players ==
The team is open to any player that is a Belgian citizen or permanent resident, a temporary resident of Belgium or has excessive contact with Belgian quidditch at the discretion of the head of Belgium Muggle Quidditch.

=== 2014-2015 Vancouver ===
The first roster was established for the 2014 Global Games in Vancouver. No try-outs were held and players had to be chosen on the basis of whether or not they could afford the trip. The following players took part to this competition.

2013/2014 Season
No.	Pos.	Player	Nat.	Team
10	C	Laurens Grinwis Plaat Stultjes	(Belgium)	Brussels Qwaffles
9	C	Jana Meers	(Belgium)	Brussels Qwaffles
11	C	Nathan Wilputte	(Belgium)	Brussels Qwaffles
07	C/K/S	Corentin (Cory) Faniel	(Belgium)	(Scotland) St. Andrews Snidgets
06	K	Gorik Verbeken	(Belgium)	Brussels Qwaffles
72	B	David Danos (C)	(Canada)	Brussels Qwaffles
4	B	Inke Gieghase	(Belgium)	Deurne Dodo's
12	B	Jerona van der Gevel	(Netherlands)	(Netherlands) AmsterDragons
3	C/S	Pauline Schena	(Belgium)	Brussels Qwaffles
17	B	Laura Mailleux	(Belgium)	Brussels Qwaffles
18	C	Ruth D'Hoore	(Belgium)	Ghent Gargoyles
26	B	Lieselot Van den Abbeele	(Belgium)	Ghent Gargoyles

=== 2015-2016 Sarteano ===
Following the announce of the European Games, it was decided that new players would be selected to compete in Sarteano, Italy, against other European national teams. This would reflect the growth of quidditch in Belgium and increase the depth of the team The selection process involved scouting players who had applied to be part of the team, but no try-outs. The final roster was announced on May 22 and consisted of 20 players, with only four Gryffins from the previous selection returning to the team. Two players were kept as reserve: Rik De Boeck and Brian Verbeure, with Rik ending up joining the team. The Belgian Quidditch Federation nominated Louis Lermytte and Corentin (Cory) Faniel as coaches.

2014/2015 Season
No.	Pos.	Player	Nat.	Team
10	C	Laurens Grinwis Plaat Stultjes	(Belgium)	Ghent Gargoyles Quidditch Club
16	C/K/S	Seppe De Wit	(Belgium)	Deurne Dodo A
13	B	Elisabeth Reyniers	(Belgium)	Deurne Dodo A
2	C/K/S/B	Tim van Huygevoort (Cap.)	(Belgium)	Deurne Dodo A
9	C	Jana Meers	(Belgium)	Brussels Qwaffles / Hasselt Horntails
26	S/C	Pieter Goossens	(Belgium)	Hasselt Horntails
12	B	Pauline Raes	(Belgium)	Ghent Gargoyles Quidditch Club
7	K/C/S/B	Corentin (Cory) Faniel (Coach)	(Belgium)	(United Kingdom) Leeds Griffins
21	C/K/S	Florian Dion	(Belgium)	Brussels Qwaffles / Les Dracognards
14	C	Jorge Diaz	(Belgium)	Brussels Qwaffles
789	B/S/C	Tanghi Burlion (V-Cap.)	(Belgium)	Brussels Qwaffles
949	B	Shati Patel	(Belgium)	(United Kingdom) Oxford Quidlings
69	C/K/S	Nathan Wilputte	(Belgium)	Brussels Qwaffles
4	C/B	Ellen Huycke	(Belgium)	Ghent Gargoyles Quidditch Club
94	B	Pauline Berger	(Belgium)	Brussels Qwaffles / Les Dracognards
717	C/K/S	Nicolas Volders	(Belgium)	Leuven Leprechauns
33	C/B/S	Louis Lermytte (Coach)	(Belgium)	Deurne Dodo A
17	C	Charlotte Buelens	(Belgium)	Deurne Dodo B
89	B	Moussa Fall	(Belgium)	Brussels Qwaffles
23	B	Caroline Mailleux	(Belgium)	Brussels Qwaffles
34	B	Rik de Boeck	(Belgium)	Leuven Leprechauns

=== 2015-2016 Frankfurt ===
After receiving more than 60 applications, the four members of the selection committee named 32 players to take part to the first 3 trainings. The Selection committee was appointed by the Belgian Quididtch Federation to include both coaches from the previous year (Louis Lermytte and Cory Faniel), the former captain (Tim van Huygevoort) and a former member of the selection committee (Soraya A.). They also decided to appoint Louis Lermytte as coach, who took Laurens Grinwis Plaat Stultjes as his non-playing team manager.

Team
Position	Player	Team
C	Ellen Huycke	Ghent Gargoyles
B	Elisabeth Reyniers	Deurne Dodo A
B	Soraya Abbagnato	Deurne Dodo A
K	Louis Lermytte	Deurne Dodo A
C	Jorge Diaz	Brussels Qwaffles
C	Seppe De Wit	Deurne Dodo A
B	Faust Eeckhout	Deurne Dodo A
C	Emile Aerts	Deurne Dodo A
C	Nathan Wilputte	Brussels Qwaffles
C	Chayenne Van Meel	Brussels Qwaffles
B	Damien Leclaire	Brussels Qwaffles
C	Micah Unruh	Ghent Gargoyles
C	Audrey Linssen	Liège Leviathans
C	Tim Van Huygevoort	Deurne Dodo A
C	Lana Naudts	Brussels Qwaffles
C	Jens De Graeve	Bruges Bridgebacks
B	Tanghi Burlion	Brussels Qwaffles
C	Willem Ardui	Deurne Dodo A
C	Laurent Venckeleer	Deurne Dodo A
C	Arnaud Liepin	Liège Leviathans
B	Axiana Govaert	Ghent Gargoyles

2016 - 2017 European Games - Oslo

Team
Position	Player	Team
B	Abbagnato Soraya	Antwerp A
C	Bonnet Paul	Antwerp A
C	Busson Hato	Brussels Qwaffles
C	De Graeve Jens	Bruges Bridgebacks
C	De Leu Nick	Ghent Gargoyles
C	De Wit Seppe	Antwerp A
B	Dion Florian	Brussels Qwaffles
B	Dubois Jan	Antwerp A
B	Eeckhout Faust	Antwerp A
C/K	Hodeche Sylvain	Liège Leviathans
C/K/B	Lermytte Louis	Antwerp A
C	Meers Jana	Brussels Qwaffles
C	Noiret Jerôme	Liège Leviathans
C	Olivier Jade	Antwerp B
C	Porres Hanne	Antwerp B
B	Prime Morgane	Antwerp A
B	Reyniers Elisabeth	Antwerp A
C/K	Unruh Micah	Ghent Gargoyles
C	Van Huygevoort Tim	Antwerp A
C	Van Meel Chayenne	Brussels Qwaffles
C/K	Wilputte Nathan	Antwerp A

== Competitive Record ==
=== 2014 Global Games ===
The Gryffins made their debut at the 2014 IQA Global Games where they placed last. Due to lack of selection process and the fact that the team had just eleven players, the Gryffins had difficulties keeping to pace with the competition. However, as the quaffle point differentials show, Team Belgium, while outmatched, did not experience all complete losses, most notably in the Belgium-Canada game where a strong defensive line held the score to just 70–30* Canada. What solidified Belgium's seventh place was the final forfeit to Team USA where it was decided by the team to no longer progress as much of the team had succumbed to treatable injury.

2014 Global Games
Opposing team	Winning team	GF	GA	SC	MM:SS
Team Mexico	(Mexico)	70	150	(Mexico)	24:00
Team Canada	(Canada)	30	70	(Belgium)	18:19
(United Kingdom) Team UK	(United Kingdom)	50	90	(Belgium)	14:31
Team Australia	(Australia)	0	160	(Australia)	20:00
Team France	(France)	60	140	(Belgium)	-**
(United States) Team USA	(United States)	0	150	-*	00:00

* Indicates that that was forfeited with a 150*-0 loss.

** Indicates unknown game time.

=== 2015 European Games ===
At the 2015 European Games, the Belgian Gryffins came second of their group, with the highest QPD, behind France and ahead of Turkey, Catalonia, Spain and Poland. Facing the host, Italy, in the quarter of finals, Belgium conceded no goal and proceeded to face the UK in the semi-final. This was among the toughest games of the tournament for the UK, but the Gryffins lost on a snitch catch. As a result, Belgium entered the 3rd place play-off against Norway, that had lost facing France in the other semi-final. This game saw Norway pull ahead before Belgium scored a series of goals, but failing to come back within snitch range before Norway ended the game. The team ranked fourth overall and firmly established the country as one of the strongest in Europe.

2015 European Games
Opposing team	Winning team	PF	PA	SC	Type
Team France	(France)	50	150	(France)	Group
Team Spain	(Belgium)	140	20	(Belgium)	Group
Team Catalonia	(Belgium)	190	50	(Belgium)	Group
Team Poland	(Belgium)	150	0	(Belgium)	Group
Team Turkey	(Belgium)	140	50	(Turkey)	Group
Team Italy	(Belgium)	90	30	(Italy)	1/4 final
(United Kingdom) Team UK	(United Kingdom)	40	80	(United Kingdom)	1/2 final
Team Norway	(Norway)	80	150	(Norway)	3rd place play-off

=== 2016 World Cup ===
2016 World Cup
Opposing team	Winning team	PF	PA	SC	Type
Team Australia	(Australia)	70	130	(Belgium)	Group
(Republic of Ireland) Team Ireland	(Belgium)	250	20	(Belgium)	Group
Team Slovakia	(Belgium)	160	60	(Slovakia)	Group
Team Italy	(Belgium)	210	130	(Belgium)	Round of 16
(United States) Team USA	(United States)	50	130	(United States)	Quarter Finals
Team Turkey	(Turkey)	140	150	(Turkey)	5-8 Losers Bracket
Team Mexico	(Belgium)	150	30	(Belgium)	7th Place Play-off

== See also ==
- Muggle quidditch
- International Quidditch Association
- Sport in Belgium
