= United Kingdom national quidditch team =

National sports team representing the United Kingdom

Team UK
- Team UK logo
- Full name: United Kingdom National Quidditch Team
- Nicknames: Team UK
- Sport: Quidditch
- Founded: 2012
- Disbanded: 2021
- League: International Quidditch Association
- Colours: Red, White, and Blue
- Owner: QuidditchUK
- Head coach: Emily Oughtibridge
- Captain: William Orridge
- Championships: (gold) 2017 IQA European Games; (bronze) 2016 IQA World Cup; (silver) 2015 IQA European Games

The United Kingdom National Quidditch Team, colloquially known as Team UK, was the official national Quidditch team of the United Kingdom. Team UK made its debut in 2012 at the IQA Summer Games in Oxford, UK where it placed 5th of 5 teams. The team then played in Canada at the 2014 IQA Global Games in Burnaby, BC on 29 July 2014, where it placed 4th of 7 teams and in the European Games in Sarteano, Italy in July 2015, placing 2nd of 12. Team UK gained its first medals at the IQA World Cup 2016 in Frankfurt on 23–24 July 2016, finishing 3rd out of 21 teams. In 2017 the team gained its first international trophy, winning the IQA European Games, beating France in the final. Team UK's final tournament appearance was a 3rd place medal at the 2019 IQA European Games in Bamberg.

In 2021 Team UK was split into three separate independently managed teams: Team England, Team Scotland and Team Wales.

== History ==
Team UK was formed just in time for the 2012 IQA Summer Games in Oxford, where it competed alongside the United States, France, Australia and Canada. At the time, Quidditch in the UK was very thin on the ground; a few teams in the UK played by IQA rules, namely Avada Keeledavra and the Leicester Lovegoods (now Keele Squirrels and Leicester Thestrals), but they had only just started up that year. Other groups such as the University of Nottingham Quidditch Society and the various College teams at Oxford played by local variations on the rulebook. This meant that the UK was the most inexperienced team represented at the games, with many of its players being free-agents with no game experience. Though the UK came last at the event, roundly defeated by every other team, this event spawned the mass growth of the sport in the United Kingdom. The event was eventually won by the United States with a landslide victory over France in the Final.

The successor event to the Summer Games, the 2014 IQA Global Games, took place in Burnaby, Canada, and again the United Kingdom was represented. An initial round of try-outs selected 42 players who were later divided into the travelling team and the reserves. This event saw the UK compete against the US, Canada, Australia, France, Belgium and Mexico. The two years of intensive growth in the UK since the last appearance of its national team was reflected, and the team won major victories against Belgium and Mexico. Though they were defeated by a wide margin by the US and Canada, the UK forced extra-time against eventual silver-medallists Australia despite eventual loss and soundly defeated old rivals France. The UK was kept from the medal podium by a slight margin, losing the 3rd place playoff against Canada on a snitch-catch. The Global Games, like the Summer Games before them, were won by the Americans, who secured the gold with a wide-margin win over the Australians.

Team UK made its third appearance at the 2015 European Games, the first tournament of its kind. Team selection was made via observation of players in matches during the opening months of 2015, leading up to the British Quidditch Cup. The side finished second in the tournament, losing to France 90*-50 in the final. They topped their group, which included the hosts Italy, Norway, Germany, The Netherlands and Ireland winning every game. Victories followed in the quarter-finals against Catalonia and Belgium in the semi-finals. Team UK keeper and seeker Ollie Craig was named the MVP (most valued player) of the tournament.

Beginning with the 2015-16 season, a standing national squad was established fluctuating around 35 players who train together on a regular basis and are dropped or called up at the discretion of the captain and coaching staff. Squads for each competition will be selected from this national 'training squad'.

In July 2016, under captain Ben Morton, Team UK attended the Quidditch World Cup, held in Frankfurt, Germany with a squad of 21 chosen from the training squad. UK were one of the top 5 seeds heading into the tournament and lived up to expectations claiming bronze medals, after defeating Canada 190*-60 in the third place play off. The UK topped their group comfortably on day 1 with victories over Turkey, Austria, South Korea and Spain and carried their form into day 2 beating Slovenia and Turkey on the way to a semi-final against the USA. Whilst the UK took an early lead against the USA they were unable to hold onto it and a spot in the final was taken by the USA instead, with the UK losing 140*-40.

In October 2016 a squad of 10 travelled to Odense, Denmark to represent the UK in a friendly match against Norway held as part of the Odense Harry Potter Festival. The friendly was split into 3 games with the UK coming out on top in 2 of the games, winning the first 180*-30 and the second 90-80*, however the Norwegian team fought back to win the final game 110*-100.

In July 2017 Team UK, captained by Bill Orridge, won the IQA European Games, beating France in the finals 90*-70 on a snitch catch by Callum Lake. Andrew Hull led the UK in the final, notching four of the team's seven goals. Hosts Norway took third place.

=== Competitive record ===
==== Team UK ====
Competition	Position	Number of teams
(United Kingdom) 2012 Summer Games	5th	5
(Canada) 2014 Global Games	4th	7
(Italy) 2015 European Games	2nd	12
(Germany) 2016 World Cup	3rd	21
(Norway) 2017 European Games	1st	15
(Italy) 2018 World Cup	4th	29
(Germany) 2019 European Games	3rd	20

==== Team England, Team Scotland and Team Wales ====
Competition	Position			Number of teams
Competition	England	Scotland	Wales	Number of teams
(Germany) 2019 European Games	•	14th	•	20
(Republic of Ireland) 2022 European Games	1st	15th	16th	20
(England) 2024 European Games	2nd	14th	11th	15
(Spain) 2026 European Games	2nd	14th	13th	15

== Players ==
Where a player's club is listed, the information is accurate at the time of their representation for the event in question. The clubs listed in the 'current national squad' section are accurate for the current season. Where these names have changed over time, the name is given as the club is known now.

Players who represent, or have represented, the UK national team are as follows;

=== Current National Squad ===
The following players formed the squad winning the 2017 IQA European Games in Oslo in July 2017.

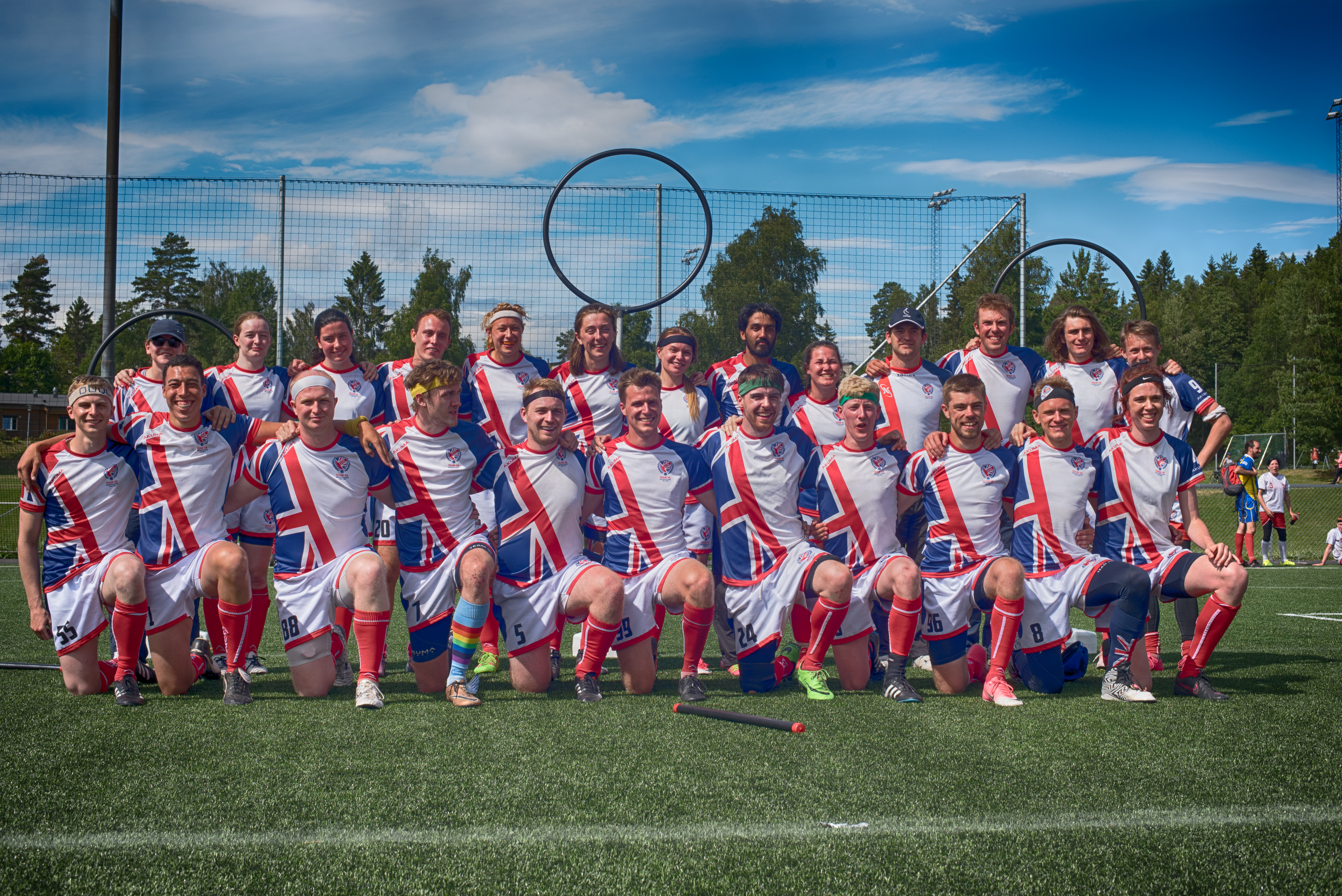
Team UK at the IQA European Games, Oslo, July 2017

	Surname	First Name	Appearances	Club
K	Hull	Andrew	34	Velociraptors Quidditch Club
K	Waters	Sebastian	16	Warwick Quidditch Club
C	Veale	Aaron	23	Werewolves of London
C	Lowe	Rebecca	18	Durhamstrang
C	Woodburn	Jacqueline	17	Velociraptors Quidditch Club
C	Malpass	Benjamin	7	Warwick Quidditch Club
C	Thanangadan	James	17	Velociraptors Quidditch Club
C	Thripp	Jemma	31	Werewolves of London
C	Heynes	Thomas	31	Velociraptors Quidditch Club
C	Riley	Oliver	7	Holyrood Hippogriffs
C	Stevens	Thomas	7	York Horntails
C	Cooper	Ashley	14*	Velociraptors Quidditch Club
C	Harris	Abigail	11	Tornadoes Quidditch Club
B	Mikolajczak	Jan	34	Werewolves of London
B	Edlund	Lucy	18	Velociraptors Quidditch Club
B	Q	Lucy	22	Velociraptors Quidditch Club
B	Sartori	Jacopo	17	Warwick Quidditch Club
B	Orridge (C)	William	22	Loughborough Longshots
B	Twist	Lukas	31	Werewolves of London
B	O'Neill	Jessica	14	Velociraptors Quidditch Club
S	Lake	Callum	7	Bangor Broken Broomsticks

*Ashley Cooper also acted as head coach of the team in a nonplaying capacity for a total of sixteen games for both European Games 2015 and World Cup 2016.

=== Squad: World Cup 2012 (Oxford, UK) ===
The following players are represented the team at the World Cup* in Oxford in Summer 2012, placing fifth of five after a defeat to all other competing countries in the round-robin.

	Surname	First Name	Club
K	John	Natalie	Leicester Thestrals
K	Wells	Harry	Leicester Thestrals
K	Barringer	Robert	Keele Squirrels
C	Gostick	Elliot	Leicester Thestrals
C	Morris	Owain	Leicester Thestrals
C	Thomson	Rebecca	Leicester Thestrals
C	Ludford-Brookes	Zoe	Keele Squirrels
C	Barry	Angus	Radcliffe Chimeras
C	Morton (C)	Benjamin	Keele Squirrels
C	Rhodes	Jonathan	Holyrood Hippogriffs
C	Harris	Abigail	Leicester Thestrals
C	Barnett	Milo	Leicester Thestrals
C	Hill	James	Leicester Thestrals
B	Guenzel	Matthew	Derby Union Quidditch Club
B	Hill	Jack	Leicester Thestrals
B	Starbuck	Emily	Holyrood Hippogriffs
B	Corbin	Matthew	Leicester Thestrals
B	Willey	Steven	None
B	Parry	Ashleigh	Oxford Quidlings
S	Young	Robert	Keele Squirrels

=== Squad: World Cup 2014 (Vancouver, Canada) ===
The following players are represented the team at the World Cup* in Burnaby, Vancouver on 19 July 2014, placing fourth of seven after a 60*-40 defeat to Canada in the third-place play-off.

	Surname	First Name	Club
K	Twist	Lukas	Radcliffe Chimeras
K	Greenhalgh	Alexander	Keele Squirrels
K	Hull	Andrew	Bangor Broken Broomsticks
C	Cooper (C)	Ashley	Radcliffe Chimeras
C	Whiteley	Abigail	Radcliffe Chimeras
C	Jørstad	Elisabeth	Radcliffe Chimeras
C	Norton	Thomas	Keele Squirrels
C	Thripp	Jemma	Southampton Quidditch Club
C	Shaw	Kai	OSI Vikings
C	Manuel	Travis	Leeds Griffins
C	McFadyen	Warren	Leicester Thestrals
C	Heynes	Thomas	Bangor Broken Broomsticks
C	Mikolajczak	Jan	Radcliffe Chimeras
B	Simpson	Connor	Keele Squirrels
B	King-Evans	Dale	Oxford Quidlings
B	Burnett	James	Radcliffe Chimeras
B	O'Neill	Jessica	Chester Centurions
B	Dishington	Rachel	Radcliffe Chimeras
B	McLaughlin	Rebecca	Keele Squirrels
B	Davies	Samuel	Bangor Broken Broomsticks
S	Young	Robert	Southampton Quidditch Club

=== Squad: European Games 2015 (Sarteano, Italy) ===
The following players are represented the team at the European Games in Sarteano on 25–26 July 2015, placing second of twelve after a 90*-50 defeat to France in the final.

	Surname	First Name	Club
K	Twist	Lukas	Radcliffe Chimeras
K	Craig	Oliver	Southampton Quidditch Club
K	Hull	Andrew	Bangor Broken Broomsticks
C	Morton	Benjamin	Keele Squirrels
C	Veale	Aaron	Southampton Quidditch Club
C	Woodburn	Jacqueline	Durhamstrang
C	Norton (C)	Thomas	Keele Squirrels
C	Thripp	Jemma	Southampton Quidditch Club
C	Calder	Lydia	Southampton Quidditch Club
C	Noble	Christopher	Warwick Quidditch Club
C	Gawne	Robert	Durhamstrang
C	Heynes	Thomas	Radcliffe Chimeras
C	Mikolajczak	Jan	Radcliffe Chimeras
B	Gregg	Imogen	Southampton Quidditch Club
B	Q	Lucy	Nottingham Nightmares
B	Carpenter	Alex	Southampton Quidditch Club
B	Faux-Nightingale	Alice	Keele Squirrels
B	Orridge	William	Loughborough Longshots
B	Brown	Alexander	Falmouth Falcons
B	Sartori	Jacopo	Warwick Quidditch Club
S	Goswell	David	Nottingham Nightmares

=== Squad: World Cup 2016 (Frankfurt, Germany) ===
The following players represented the team at the World Cup in Frankfurt on 23–24 July 2016. Following a 50-90* defeat to Canada in an exposition game two days prior to the event, the UK finished as overall third seed from group play after convincing victories over Turkey, Spain, Austria, and South Korea. The team then progressed past Slovenia and once again Turkey to a 40-130* defeat in the semi-finals against eventual runners-up the USA. Bouncing back quickly, the team won the UK's first ever global podium finish in the third-place game, taking bronze with an emphatic 190*-60 victory over Canada.

	Surname	First Name	Club
K	Twist	Lukas	Radcliffe Chimeras
K	Craig	Oliver	Southampton Quidditch Club
K	Hull	Andrew	Radcliffe Chimeras
C	Morton (C)	Benjamin	Keele Squirrels
C	Veale	Aaron	Southampton Quidditch Club
C	Lowe	Rebecca	Durhamstrang
C	Woodburn	Jacqueline	Durhamstrang
C	Thanangadan	James	Nottingham Nightmares
C	Thripp	Jemma	Southampton Quidditch Club
C	Cookes	Jonathan	Loughborough Longshots
C	Trevett	Luke	Warwick Quidditch Club
C	Waters	Sebastian	Warwick Quidditch Club
C	Heynes	Thomas	Radcliffe Chimeras
B	Mikolajczak	Jan	Radcliffe Chimeras
B	Edlund	Lucy	Nottingham Nightmares
B	Q	Lucy	Nottingham Nightmares
B	Burnett	James	Warwick Quidditch Club
B	Carpenter	Alex	Southampton Quidditch Club
B	Walker	Alice	Radcliffe Chimeras
B	Orridge	William	Loughborough Longshots
S	Goswell	David	Nottingham Nightmares

=== Squad: Norway Fixtures at Odense Harry Potter Festival (Odense, Frankfurt) ===
	Surname	First Name	Club
K	Hull	Andrew	Velociraptors Quidditch Club
C	Morton (C)	Benjamin	Velociraptors Quidditch Club
C	Lowe	Rebecca	Durhamstrang
C	Kempster	Francesca	Loughborough Longshots
C	Thanangadan	James	Velociraptors Quidditch Club
C	Cookes	Jonathan	Tornadoes Quidditch Club
B	Mikolajczak	Jan	Werewolves of London
B	Edlund	Lucy	Velociraptors Quidditch Club
B	A'Bear	Natalie	Werewolves of London
B	Sartori	Jacopo	Warwick Quidditch Club

=== Squad: European Games 2017 (Oslo, Norway) ===
The following players represented the team at European Games in Oslo on 8–9 July 2017. Despite a pool play defeat to Belgium at the end of the first day, an impressive overall performance and undefeated second day saw them storm to their first international victory with a 90*-70 defeat of perennial rivals France.

	Surname	First Name	Club
K	Waters	Sebastian	Warwick Quidditch Club
K	Hull	Andrew	Velociraptors Quidditch Club
C	Veale	Aaron	Werewolves of London
C	Lowe*	Rebecca	Durhamstrang
C	Woodburn	Jacqueline	Velociraptors Quidditch Club
C	Thanangadan	James	Velociraptors Quidditch Club
C	Thripp	Jemma	Werewolves of London
C	Malpass	Benjamin	Warwick Quidditch Club
C	Heynes	Thomas	Velociraptors Quidditch Club
C	Harris	Abigail	Tornadoes Quidditch Club
C	Stevens	Thomas	HogYork Horntails
C	Cooper	Ashley	Velociraptors Quidditch Club
C	Riley	Oliver	Holyrood Hippogriffs
B	Mikolajczak	Jan	Werewolves of London
B	Edlund	Lucy	Velociraptors Quidditch Club
B	Q	Lucy	Velociraptors Quidditch Club
B	Sartori	Jacopo	Warwick Quidditch Club
B	O'Neill	Jessica	Velociraptors Quidditch Club
B	Twist	Lukas	Werewolves of London
B	Orridge (C)	William	Loughborough Longshots
S	Lake	Callum	Bangor Broken Broomsticks

*Rebecca Lowe suffered a pre-tournament injury and did not make any appearances during the tournament, but remained a named member of the squad, was present for every game, and received a winners' medal with the rest of the squad.

- The tournaments in 2012 and 2014 were at the time called Summer Games and Global Games respectively, but are referred to here as World Cup since this has been determined to be the name for the biennially-held worldwide international tournament going forward. The 2016 World Cup was the first to be referred to as such at the time.

== See also ==
- England national quadball team
- Scotland national quadball team
- QuidditchUK
- International Quadball Association
