= 2012 IQA Summer Games =

IQA Summer Games
- 2012

Tournament information
- Sport: Quidditch
- Location: Oxford, United Kingdom
- Date: 8 July 2012
- Administrator: International Quidditch Association
- Tournament format(s): Pool play Single elimination bracket
- Host(s): QuidditchUK
- Teams: 5

Final positions
- Champion: United States
- 1st runner-up: France
- 2nd runner-up: Australia

Tournament statistics
- Matches played: 14

The 2012 IQA World Cup, known at the time as the Summer Games, was the first edition of this national teams international championship. It was played at Cutteslowe Park and South Park in Oxford, United Kingdom. The Cup was scheduled to coincide with the arrival of the 2012 Summer Olympics torch. The United States won the tournament 160*–0 to France in the final. An exhibition match was also played on Monday, July 9 between the United States and the United Kingdom as part of the official Oxford Olympic torch ceremony.

== Participating teams ==
Team
Canada
France
Australia
United Kingdom (host)
United States

== Group stage ==
Pos	Team	W	L	PF	PA	PD	Qualification
1	United States	4	0	510	20	490	Qualify for playoffs
2	Canada	3	1	250	280	-30	Qualify for playoffs
3	France	2	2	290	260	30	Qualify for playoffs
4	Australia	1	3	170	360	-190	Qualify for playoffs
5	United Kingdom	0	4	120	540	-420	

United Kingdom	40*	–	140	France

United States	210*	–	0	Australia

Canada	100	–	60*	United Kingdom

United States	90*	–	10	France

Australia	40*	–	50	Canada

United States	190*	–	0	United Kingdom

France	80	–	40*	Australia

United States	120*	–	10	Canada

United Kingdom	20	–	90*	Australia

France	60	–	90* (OT)	Canada

== Playoffs ==
Winner Runner-up Third place

Semi-finals
Australia	140
United States	150*
Canada	40
France	90*

Final
United States	160*
France	0
Third place
Australia	60*
Canada	50

Exhibition match
9 July
United States	200
United Kingdom	60
