= International Quadball Association =

Governing body for the sport of quadball

- Abbreviation: IQA
- Predecessor: Intercollegiate Quidditch Association – November 11, 2007
- Formation: 1 January 2010 (16 years ago)
- Type: Federation of national associations
- Legal status: Nonprofit organization
- Region served: Worldwide
- Members: 39 national governing bodies (NGBs)
- Official language: English, French
- Main organ: Board of Trustees
- Website: iqasport.org

The International Quadball Association (IQA), previously known as the International Quidditch Association, is the governing body for the sport of quadball. It was founded as the Intercollegiate Quidditch Association in 2009 following the first intercollegiate quidditch match. In 2010, the IQA added the "international" term to its name, and 2016 saw its induction as an international sports federation with its creation of the Congress. It comprises more than ten national associations governing quidditch in their respective nations.

The IQA was founded on the campus of Middlebury College, in Vermont by Alexander Manshel. The association is responsible for the organization of the world's major quadball tournaments and events, most notably the IQA Global Games, as well as international rule setting and worldwide expansion.

== History ==
Quadball, then known as "muggle quidditch", began in 2005 as an intramural league at Middlebury College in Vermont. The rules were adapted from author J. K. Rowling's Harry Potter novels. In 2007, Alex Benepe founded the Intercollegiate Quidditch Association. In 2010 the name was changed to the International Quidditch Association, the year it hosted the first Quadball World Cup.

In July 2022, the IQA announced plans to change its name to the International Quadball Association, attempting to re-brand the sport, both to avoid future confrontation with Warner Bros. Entertainment over their trademark of the term "Quidditch", and to distance the sport from J. K. Rowling due to her controversial statements about transgender people.

== Membership ==
Members of the IQA: full members, associate members.

To compete in the World Cup, teams must be registered IQA members.

=== Full members ===
Full members of the IQA are national governing bodies of quadball of that region/territory; the representation of a region's quadball activity at the IQA level. Each national governing body receives between one and three delegates, all of whom receive one vote apiece, depending on their "Quadball Development Index". National governing bodies are also required to offer an annual culminating championship tournament.

As of 2022, the full member NGBs are:

- Argentinian Quidditch Association (AQArg, Spanish: Asociación Quidditch de Argentina)
- Quadball Australia (QAI)
- Quidditch Austria (QAT)
- (Belgium) Belgian Quidditch Federation (BQF, French: Fédération Belge de Quidditch, Dutch: Belgische Zwerkbalbond)
- Quadball Canada (QC)
- (Catalonia) Catalan Quidditch Association (AQC, Catalan: Associació de Quidditch de Catalunya)
- (France) French Quidditch Federation (FQF, French: Fédération du Quidditch Français)
- (Germany) German Quidditch Federation (DQB, German: Deutscher Quidditchbund)
- (Italy) Italian Quidditch Association (AIQ, Italian: Associazione Italiana Quidditch)
- (Mexico) Quidditch México (QMX)
- (Netherlands) Quidditch Nederland (QNL)
- (Norway) Norwegian Quidditch Association (NRF, Norwegian: Norges Rumpeldunkforbund)
- (Peru) Peruvian Quidditch Sports Federation (FDPQ, Spanish: Federación Deportiva Peruana de Quidditch)
- (Poland) Polish Quidditch League (PLQ, Polish: Polska Liga Quidditcha)
- (Spain) Spanish Quidditch Association (AQE, Spanish: Asociación Quidditch España)
- (Switzerland) Swiss Quadball Association (SQV/ASQ, German: Schweizerischer Quadballverband, French: Association Suisse de Quadball, Italian: Associazione Svizzera di Quadball)
- Quidditch Association in Turkey (QD, Turkish: Quidditch Derneği)
- (United Kingdom) QuadballUK (QUK)
- (United States) US Quadball (USQ)

=== Associate members ===
Associate member National Governing Bodies have two teams or more and a Quadball Development Index below the threshold set by the IQA. They are entitled to an independent voice in the IQA Congress but cannot vote. Developing National Governing Bodies are required to have evidence of regular competitive play.

As of 2022, the associate member NGBs are:

- (Brazil) Brazilian Quidditch Association (ABRQ, Portuguese: Associação Brasileira de Quadribol)
- (Chile) Chilean Quidditch Association (Spanish: Asociación Chilena de Quidditch)
- (Czech Republic) Czech Quidditch Association (CQA, Czech: Česká Asociace Famfrpálu)
- (Denmark) Danish Quidditch Association (Danish: Dansk Quidditchforbund)
- Quidditch Ireland (QIRE)
- Japan Quidditch Association (JQA, Japanese: 日本クィディッチ協会, romanized: Nihon Kuiditchi Kyōkai)
- (Slovakia) Slovak Quidditch Association (SQA, Slovak: Slovenská Metlobalová Asociácia)
- Quidditch Association of Slovenia (Slovene: Quidditch zveza Slovenije)
- (Sweden) Swedish Quidditch Federation (SvQF, Swedish: Svenska Quidditchförbundet)
- Quidditch Uganda
- Vietnam Quidditch Association (Vietnamese: Hiệp hội Quidditch Việt Nam)

=== Continental committees ===
Under the IQA, there can exist groups of NGBs that work together to form a committee devoted to promoting the sport within the region. The only current committee in existence is the European Committee for Quadball (or Quadball Europe). It is composed of two representatives from all NGBs within Europe, even those that do not have full representation at the IQA-level. Quadball Europe is in charge of the yearly tournament, the European Quidditch Cup, which contests the best teams across the continent, as well as the European Games, where national teams from Europe come together to compete every other year.

== Rules of the sport ==
The IQA publishes through its own rules department a set of updated rules each year that teams registered with a national association must adhere to during any and all international play. For the 2014–15, the IQA will use USQ's published Rulebook 8 in every and all tournaments except for the 2014 Global Games. It is up to the member league itself to determine whether or not they wish to adhere to every IQA rule, but member leagues must follow the IQA rules in international play or unless another set of rules is agreed upon.

== Title 9 ¾ ==
Since its inception, the IQA has sought equality on the pitch in terms of gender. One of the most strict requirements is that "each team [is] to have at least two players on the field who identify with a different gender than at least two other players. The gender that a player identifies with is considered to be that player's gender, which may or may not be the same as that person's sex." Because of this wording, quidditch is becoming a promotor of sports for equal basing for both women and the LGBT community. As of 2013, the IQA has created Title 9 ¾, a branch of the IQA that actively promotes advocacy and awareness as well as gender equality and inclusivity.

However, this policy has drawn sharp criticism from single-sex institutions for whom it is difficult or impossible to attract players of the opposite gender. Women's teams from Smith College and Wellesley College were prohibited from tournament play because of this rule.

== Tournaments ==
=== IQA World Cup ===
The World Cup is the IQA's tournament for national teams. Any quidditch-playing nation is offered the chance at competing on the world level at this tournament. The latest iteration was held in Florence, Italy in June/July 2018, with the US taking first place and Belgium coming in second.

The original World Cup was titled both "Summer Games" to match the Olympics being held in London, UK and "Global Games." July 2012 saw five national teams from around the world compete in this first international tournament run by the IQA, taking place in University Parks, Oxford, England. The five teams were from the US, Canada, France, UK, and Australia.

=== European Games ===
The IQA European Games is the regional tournament held every off-year alongside the World Cup. The inaugural Games were held in Sarteano, Italy in July 2015 which saw 12 nations compete with France being the winner over the UK.

=== Former ===
Until 2014, the IQA organized the previous iteration of what became the US Quidditch Cup, known at the time as the IQA World Cup. To compete, registered teams were required to participate in their regional tournaments, of which 2014 had nine regions (seven in North America, one for Europe and one for Oceania). Each region received a certain number of bids at the beginning of the season, and teams who placed within that number of bids were offered a spot at the World Cup.

Being in the United States each year drew criticism from the rest of the quadball world, where Australia fostered a solid quadball community, and Europe was consistently growing. 2014, the last year the World Cup in this function was held, saw all European teams refuse their bids due to costs and desire to support a more international IQA with their attendance at the Global Games.

== See also ==
- Quidditch (real-life sport)
- Quidditch Canada
- Belgium Muggle Quidditch
- QuadballUK
- Muggle Quidditch Nederland
- Quidditch Benelux
