= Daceyville =

- Suburb
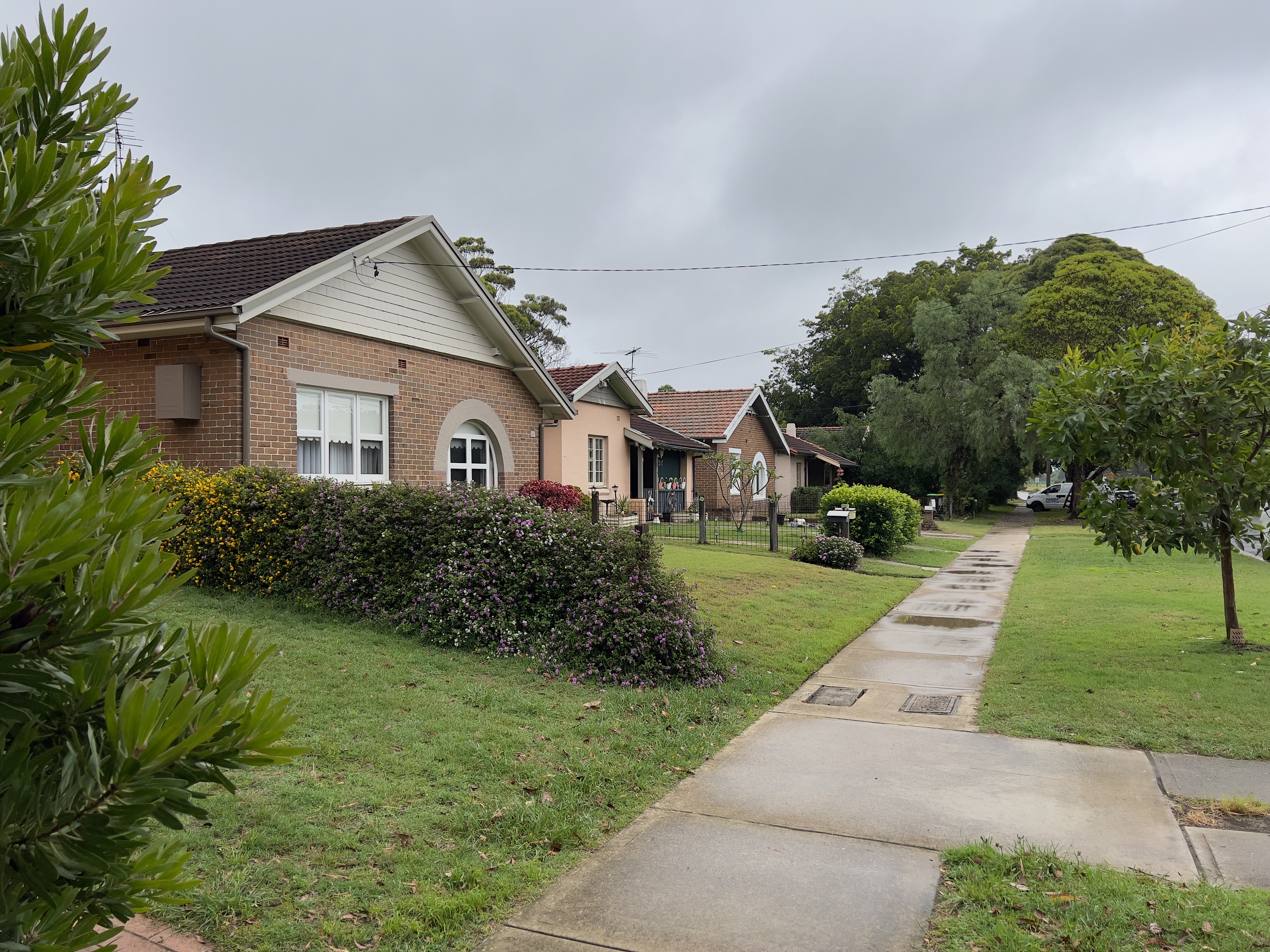
- Cottages on Cook Avenue, Daceyville

- Interactive map of Daceyville
- Country: Australia
- State: New South Wales
- City: Sydney
- LGA: Bayside Council
- Location: 7 km (4.3 mi) south-east of Sydney CBD
- Established: 1912

Government
  - State electorate: Maroubra
  - Federal division: Kingsford Smith

Area
  - Total: 0.4 km^{2} (0.15 sq mi)

Population
  - Total: 1,146 (2021 census)
  - Density: 2,900/km^{2} (7,400/sq mi)
- Postcode: 2032
Suburbs around Daceyville
Rosebery	Kingsford	Randwick
Eastlakes	Daceyville	Kingsford
Pagewood	Pagewood	Maroubra

Daceyville (formerly Dacey Garden Suburb) is a suburb in the Eastern Suburbs of Sydney, in the state of New South Wales, Australia. Daceyville is 7 km south of the Sydney central business district and is now part of Bayside Council (formerly the City of Botany Bay).

Daceyville is a quiet, leafy residential suburb, surrounded by the suburbs of Pagewood and Kingsford. The northern area of Pagewood was designed as part of the original Dacey Garden Suburb plan, as an extension of Daceyville. Many of the street layouts and park layouts in Pagewood remain unchanged from the original Dacey Garden Suburb plan.

Daceyville features Australia's first cul-de-sac street on Colonel Braund Crescent. Cook Avenue and Banks Avenue in Daceyville are some of the most unusual residential avenues in the surrounding area, with trees lining both the sides and (very unusually) the medians of the roads, in a similar style to that of Anzac Parade.

== History ==
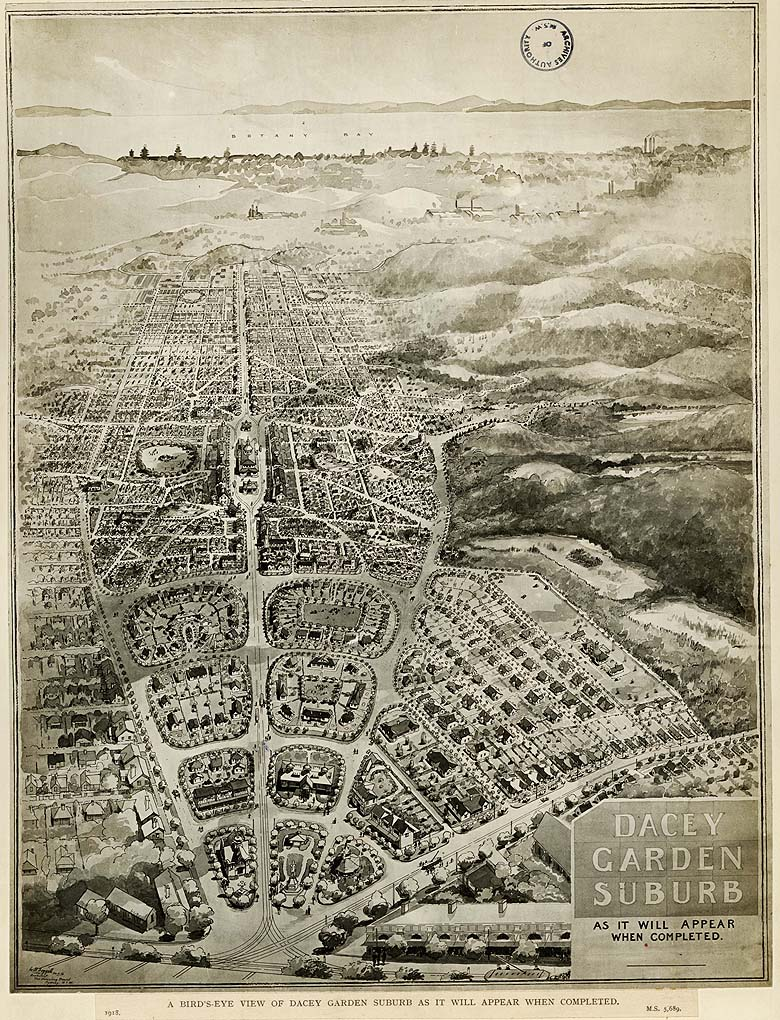
A bird's-eye view of Dacey Garden Suburb (1918)

Daceyville was proposed by and named after John Rowland Dacey (1854–1912), a state parliamentarian for the area from 1895 to 1912, who urged the creation of a garden suburb modelled on the garden city of Letchworth in Hertfordshire, England. The plan was executed after his death with a plan to provide low-cost housing for working-class people. Rowland Park in Daceyville is also named after him.

The design of Daceyville was intended to improve both the health and moral standing of residents. Laneways had been associated with rat-borne diseases, so they were not part of the design. All residents had enough land to grow their own food, no front or back fences were permitted to facilitate natural surveillance by neighbours, and homes opened at the rear onto small parks where it was expected that children would play.

Sir John Sulman (1849–1934) planned the estate on crown land that had been reserved as a water conservation site. Daceyville was listed on the Register of the National Estate in 1991.

In 1974, the New South Wales State Government proposed demolition of Daceyville's houses to make way for walk-up apartments and high rise housing. The development was also linked to a planned extension to the heavy rail line that was proposed to join Bondi Junction and Daceyville. Residents created the Daceyville Preservation Society to oppose the redevelopment, and garnered the support of the Builders Labourers Federation who were famous for their "Green Bans". Ultimately, the Daceyville Garden Suburb Heritage Conservation Area was created, and the NSW government abandoned their plans to develop enormous Waterloo-style public housing towers in Daceyville.

In the 1980s, the NSW Department of Housing embarked on a renewal project in Daceyville, which resulted in a relatively modest densification of the suburb. Numerous two-storey apartment buildings were constructed as part of the renewal, in a sympathetic architectural style to the rest of Daceyville. These new apartment buildings were mostly constructed in vacant land which had previously been rear gardens and rear parks of other homes. This land repurposing by the NSW Department of Housing has resulted in some areas of Daceyville now having three rows of houses squeezed in-between two roads, for example between Astrolabe Road and Boussole Road, and has undermined some of the original design goals of the Dacey Garden Suburb plan.

In 2021, the NSW government partnered with Ray White Kingsford to begin auctioning properties in Daceyville, transferring them to private ownership after having previously been used as public housing for over 100 years. In 2022, the NSW government partnered with N G Farah Kingsford to continue auctioning properties in Daceyville.

=== Names ===
Rowland Park is named after John Rowland Dacey, the creator of Daceyville.

Astrolabe Park, Astrolabe Road and Boussole Road were named after the two ships commanded by La Perouse, the French explorer who arrived at Botany Bay just days after the First Fleet in 1788. Many other streets in Daceyville are also named after the First Fleet, such as Cook Avenue, Endeavour Road, Solander Road, and Banks Avenue.

After World War I, Daceyville was used to provide housing for returning war veterans. Some streets in Daceyville were named after Australian and British war figures, such as Haig Park and Haig Avenue being named after Douglas Haig, the British Commander-in-Chief. Other examples include Major General Bridges Crescent, named after William Bridges, and Captain Jacka Crescent, named after Albert Jacka.

Burke Crescent and Wills Crescent were named after the explorers of the Burke and Wills expedition, which had attempted to cross the Australian continent. In the 1960s, Burke Crescent, originally named after explorer Robert Burke, was renamed to Colenso Crescent to honour four brothers who fought in World War II, two of which being killed during the war.

=== Trams and Light Rail ===
The Daceyville tram line opened in 1913 with services from Circular Quay via Waterloo. The line branched from the Botany Road line at Gardeners Road, and passed east along Gardeners Road to join the lines at Anzac Pde at what was known as Daceyville Junction. It included a large collection of sidings at the former Rosebery Racecourse, now the site of The Lakes Golf Course. Some services were extended to Maroubra Beach via the Anzac Parade lines. The line closed in 1957.

In 2020, a new light rail line opened from Circular Quay to Daceyville. The terminus is at the north-east of Dacey Gardens park known as Juniors Kingsford.

=== Public school ===
The school is situated on a five-acre site between Bunnerong Road and Banks Avenue. Application was originally made for a public school in the area in 1913, but only an infants school was initially approved. This opened at Astrolabe Road in 1914. It became a primary school in 1917.

As the suburb grew, the school became inadequate and a new site of five acres was obtained from the Housing Board, at the present site. A new building was constructed in 1921, but the new school rapidly outgrew its new premises, leading to further extensions that were completed in 1925.

== Demographics ==
According to the 2021 census, there were 1,146 residents in Daceyville. 7.7% of residents were Aboriginal and Torres Strait Islander people, more than the national average of 3.2%. Daceyville had a substantial older aged population, with 38.5% of residents being over 65 years old. The most common ancestries in Daceyville were English 24.7%, Australian 23.6%, Irish 14.3%, Australian Aboriginal 7.2% and Scottish 6.8%. 56.9% of people were born in Australia and 62.7% of people spoke only English at home. The most common responses for religion were No Religion 27.1% and Catholic 27.0%. Daceyville residents had a median household weekly income of $651, well below the national median of $1,746.

== Gallery ==
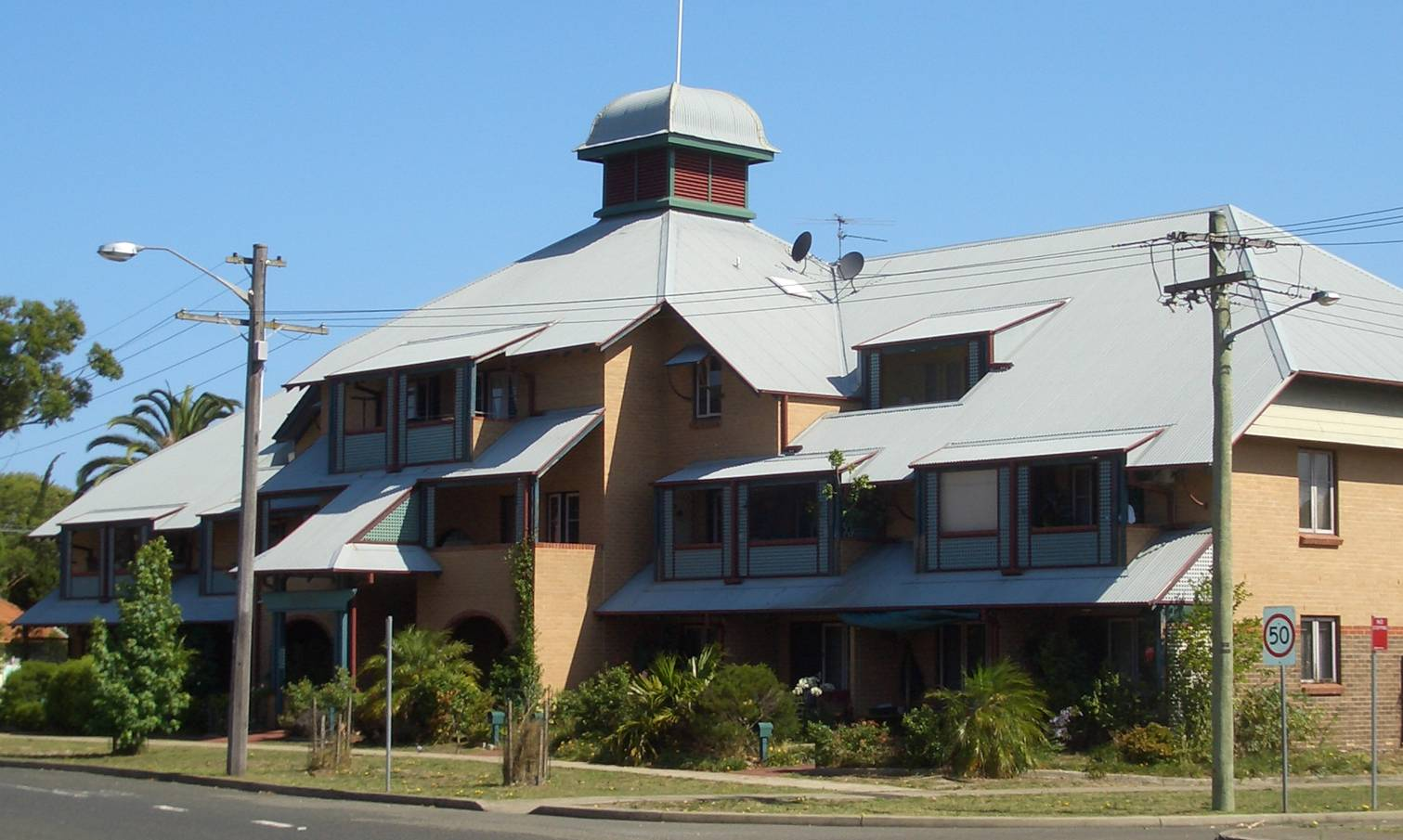
Public housing in General Bridges Crescent

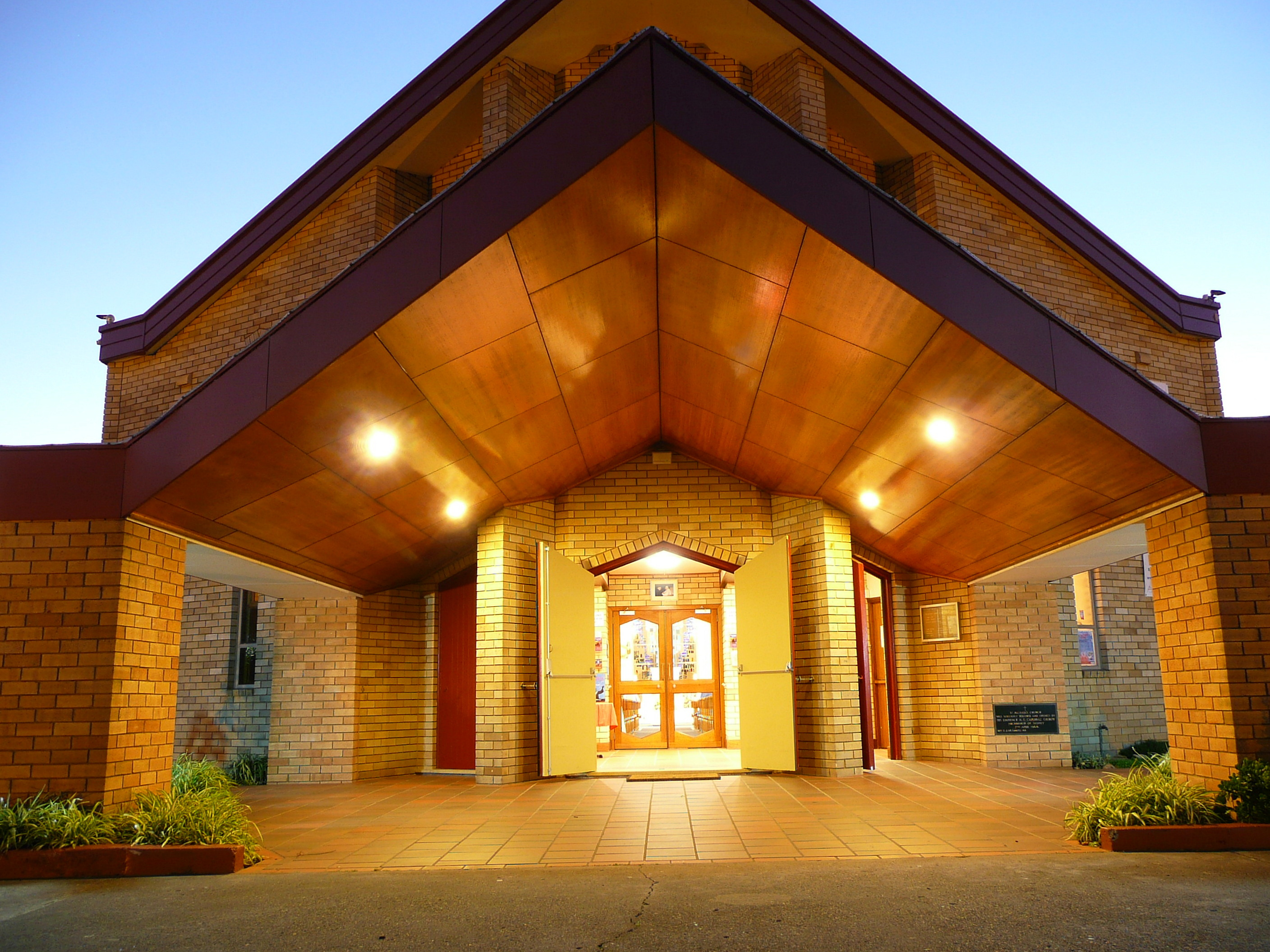
St Michael's Catholic Church, Banks Avenue

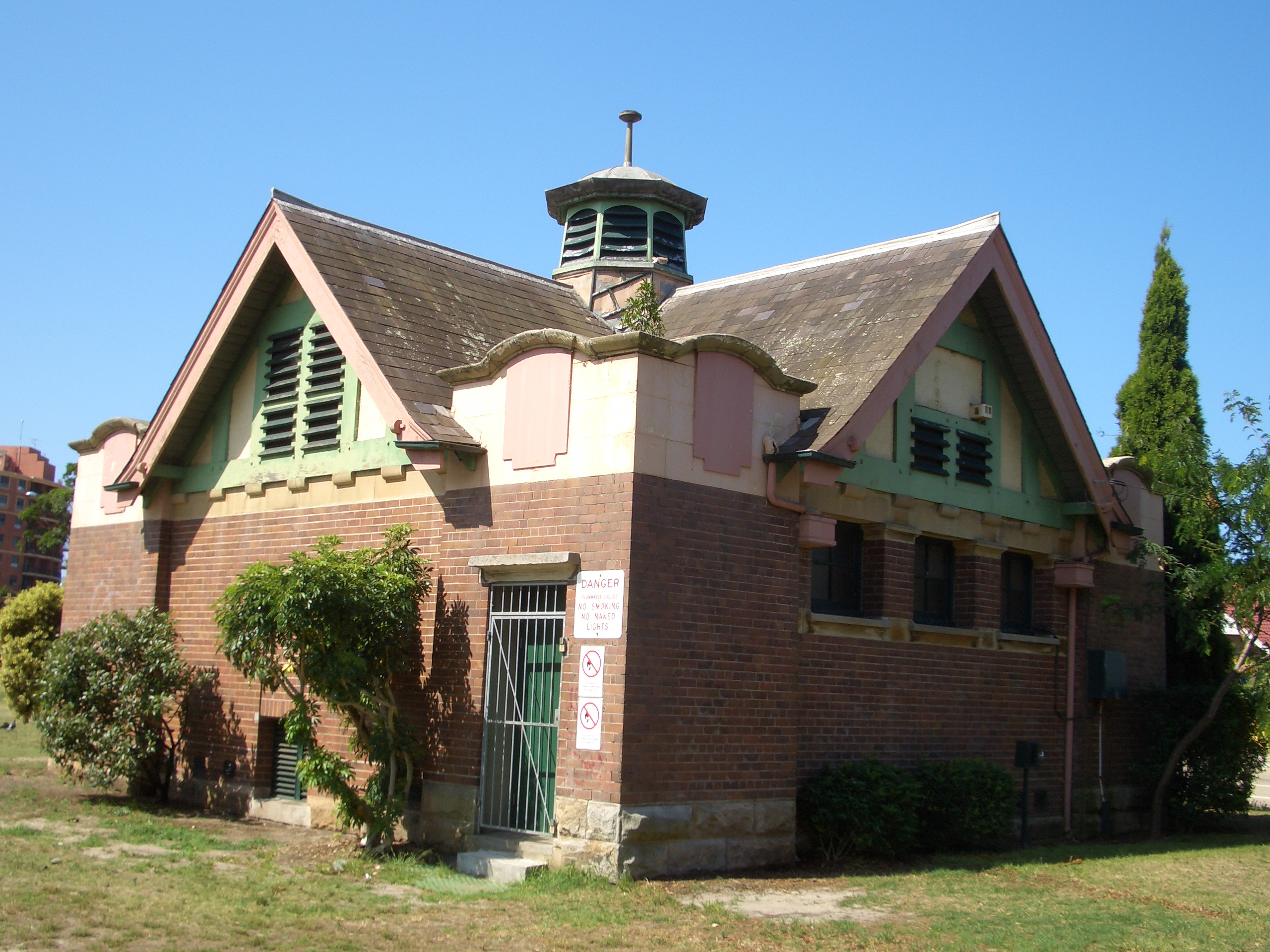
Maintenance depot, Dacey Gardens

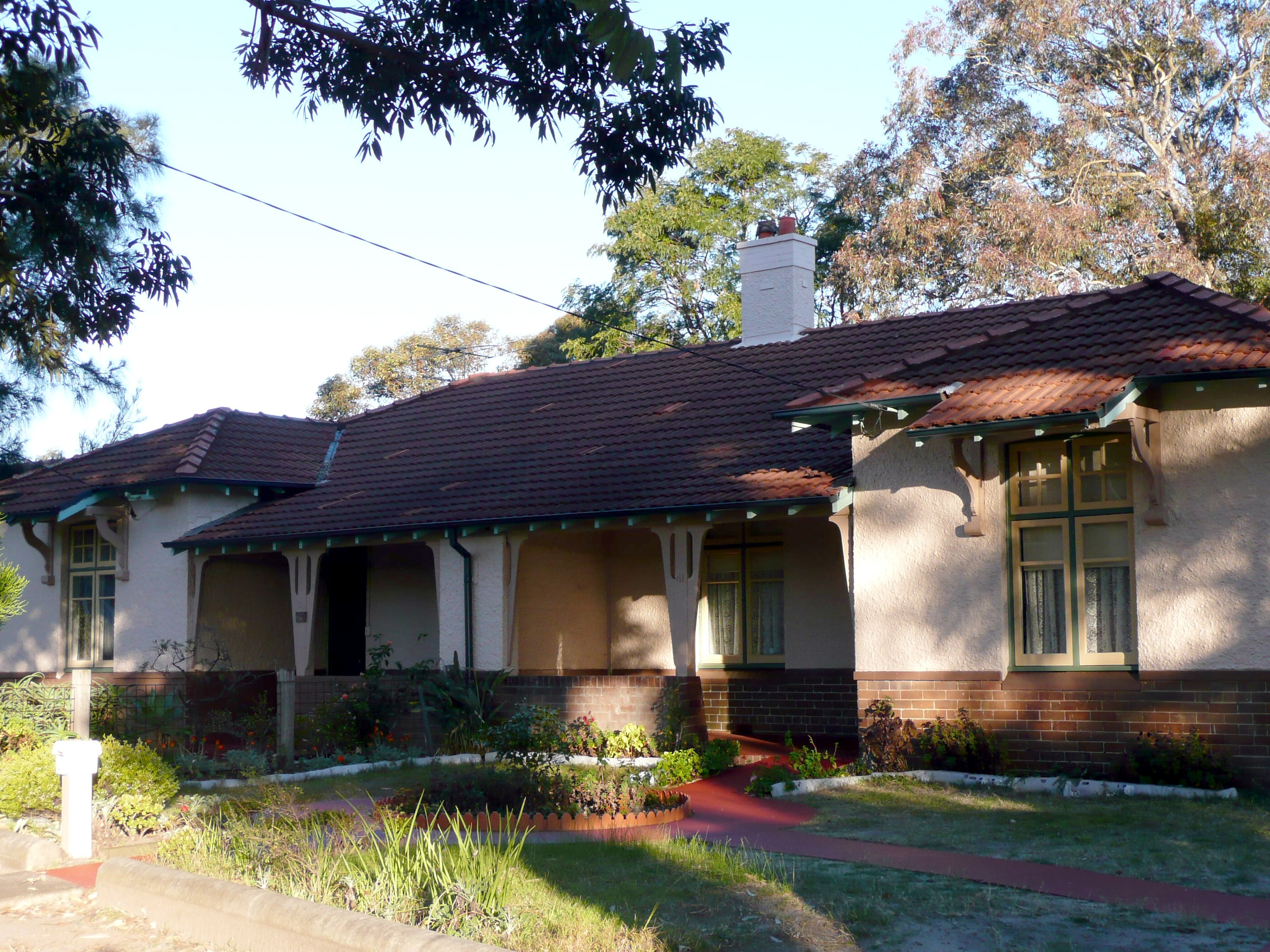
Homes in Federation Bungalow style, Gardeners Road

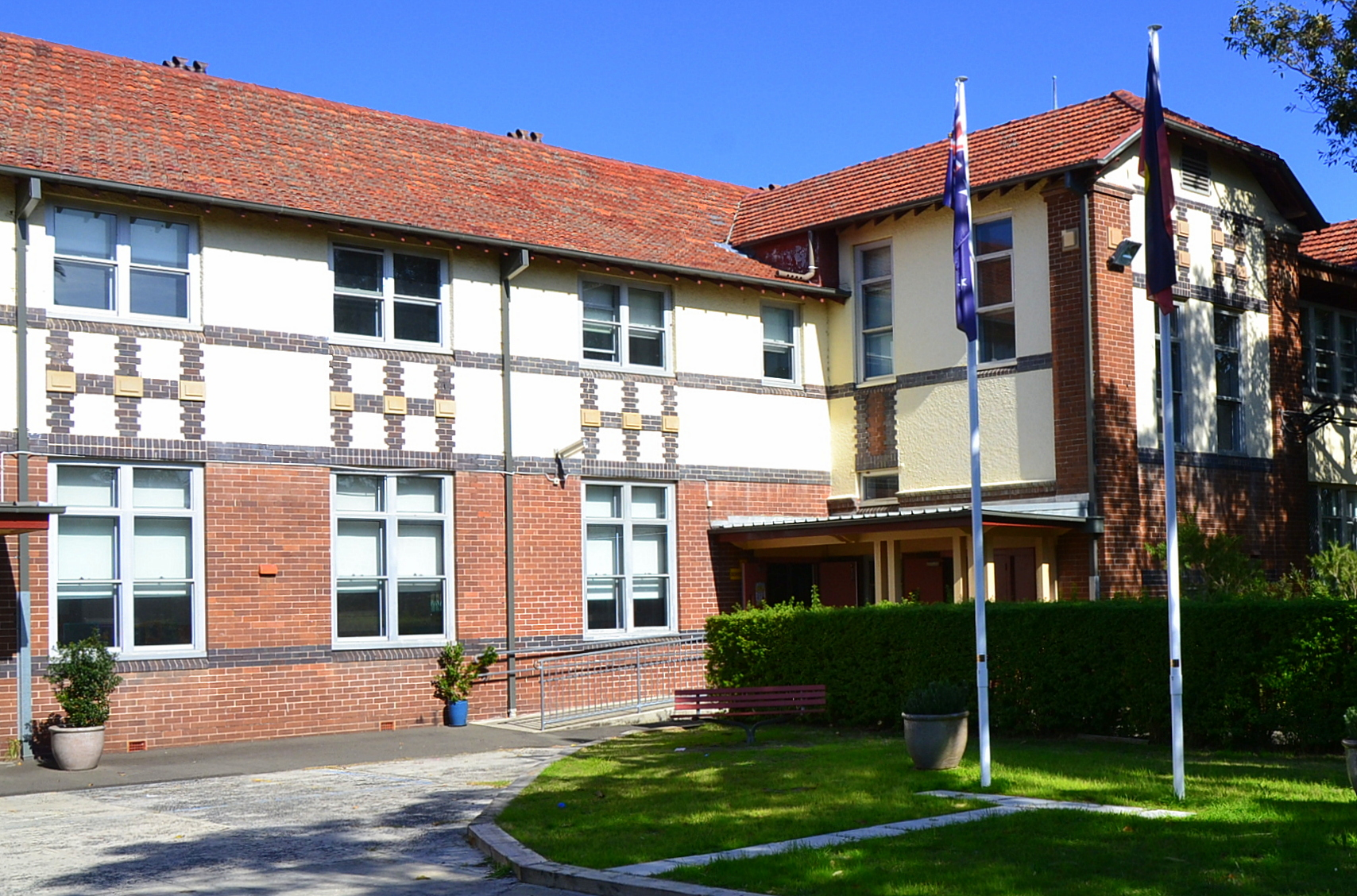
Daceyville Public School

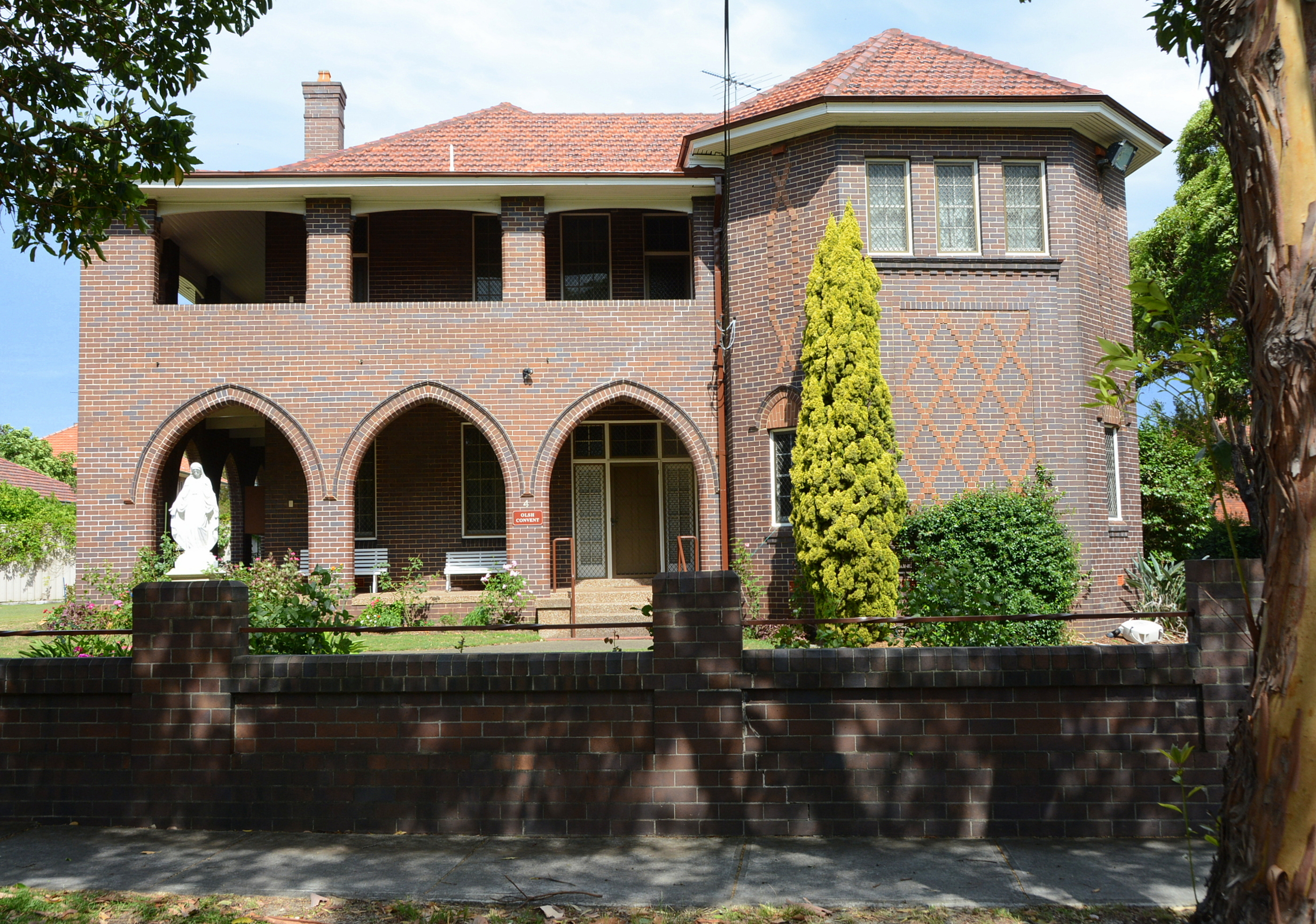
OLSH Convent, Haig Avenue

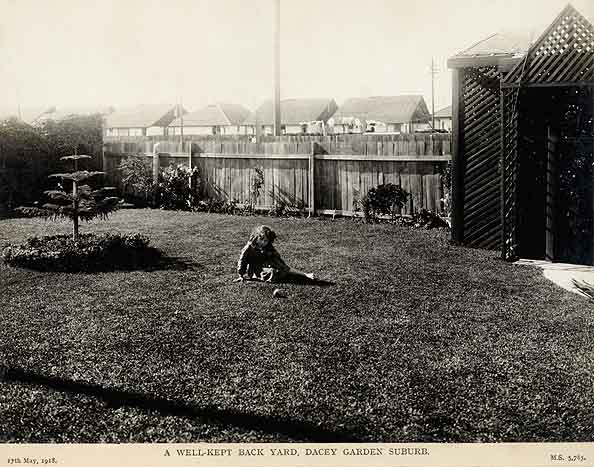
A Daceyville backyard, 1918

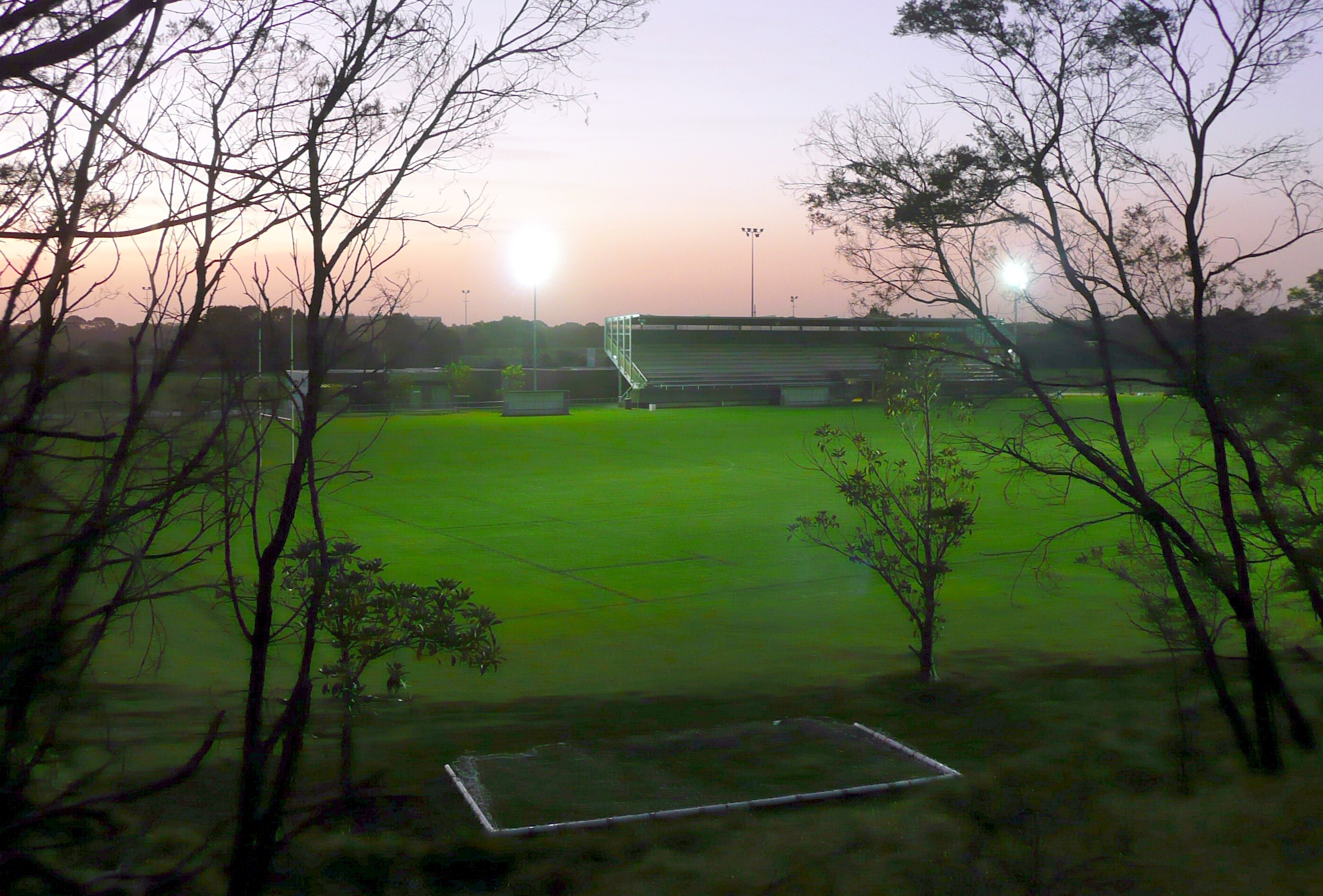
David Phillips Oval before it was redeveloped

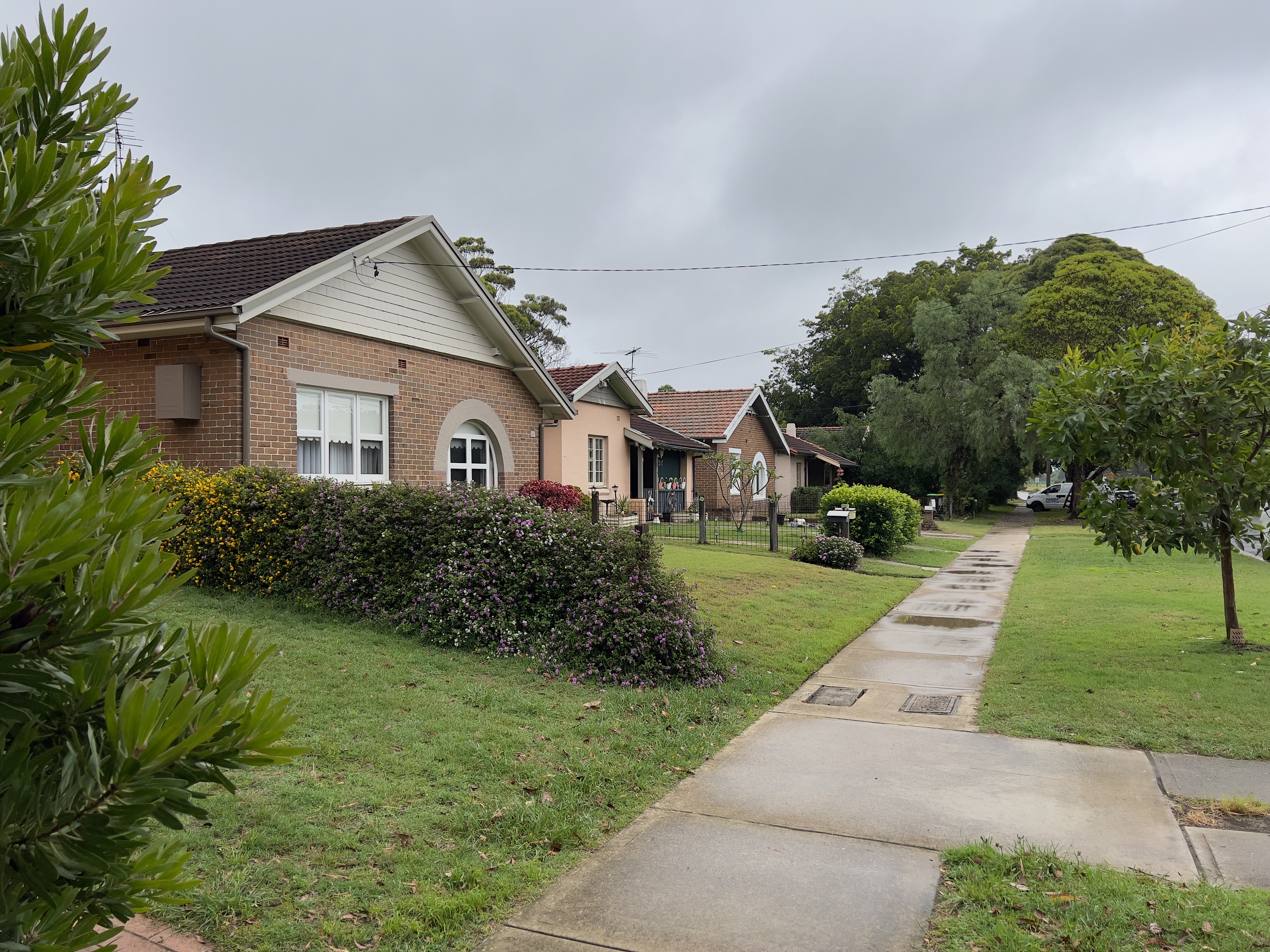
Cottages on Cook Avenue, Daceyville

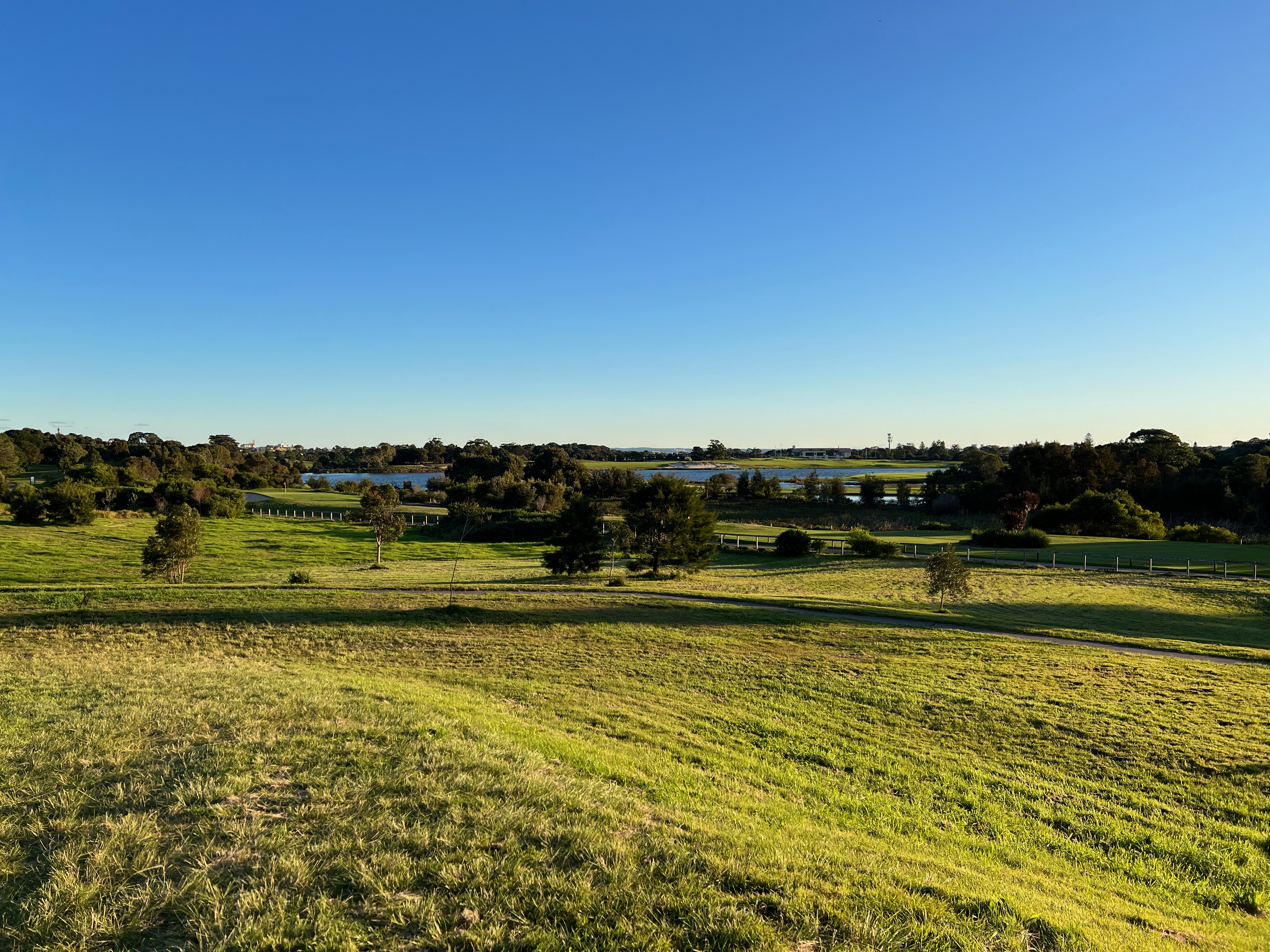
View from Astrolabe Park looking towards the Botany Dams
