= Pagewood =

- Suburb
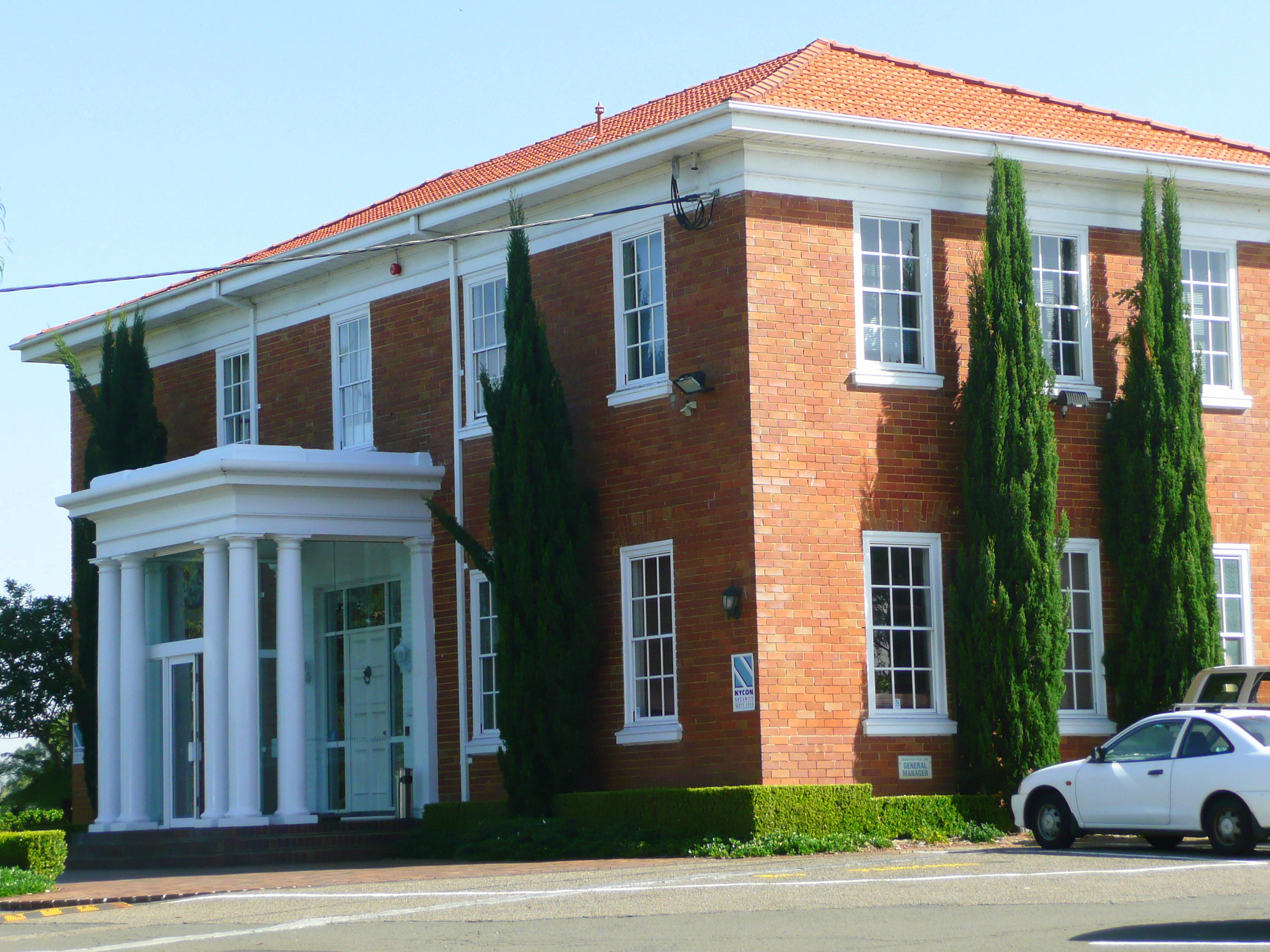
- Club house at Bonnie Doon Golf Club, Banks Avenue

- Interactive map of Pagewood
- Country: Australia
- State: New South Wales
- City: Sydney
- LGA: Bayside Council
- Location: 8 km (5.0 mi) south-east of Sydney CBD

Government
  - State electorate: Maroubra
  - Federal division: Kingsford Smith

Area
  - Total: 3.5 km^{2} (1.4 sq mi)

Population
  - Total: 3,885 (2021 census)
  - Density: 1,110/km^{2} (2,870/sq mi)
- Postcode: 2035
Suburbs around Pagewood
Kingsford		Hillsdale; Daceyville
Botany	Pagewood	Banksmeadow
Eastlakes	Eastgardens	Maroubra

Pagewood is a suburb in the Eastern Suburbs of Sydney, in the state of New South Wales, Australia, 8 kilometres south of the Sydney central business district. It is part of the Bayside Council.

Pagewood has a mixture of residential and industrial areas.

== History ==
Pagewood was originally known as "South Daceyville", before being renamed to "Pagewood" in 1929, to honour the late Alderman Fred Page, the Mayor of Botany Council in 1928. The name "Kingsford" was also considered for Pagewood, but it was rejected and later used as the new name for South Kensington.

Development of Pagewood began in 1919 with an estate called Monash Gardens. The northern part of Pagewood was originally designed to be the southern part of the Daceyville garden suburb, and many park and street layouts in Pagewood remain unchanged from the original Daceyville plans. However, unlike Daceyville, which was developed as Australia's first public housing scheme and then used to provide housing after World War I, Pagewood was privately developed. The southern part of Pagewood was originally named Dudley, and Dudley Street remains in southern Pagewood today.

National Studios was opened in 1935 and for nearly thirty years, Australian and British cinema was produced here.

In 1940, the site was bought by General Motors Holden, which operated a car manufacturing plant until 1981.

In 1953, the Pagewood Rex Hotel, currently called the Pagewood Hotel (2017), opened.

In 1960, the council considered changing the suburb name to East Botany. Residents battled to retain the name, particularly since Botany was becoming an industrial area, while Pagewood retained its identity as a mainly residential area.

Westfield Eastgardens shopping centre in Wentworth Avenue was built in the northern part of the suburb on the old Pagewood Bus Depot and part of the former site of the General Motors Holden car manufacturing plant (and totally on the old National Film Studios) and opened in 1987. The remainder of the site was sold to W.D. & H.O. Wills. Eastgardens, which covers the area around the shopping centre, was officially declared a separate suburb in 1999.

At the northern tip of Pagewood, Astrolabe Park and Astrolabe Road in Daceyville were named after one of the ships commanded by La Perouse, the French explorer who arrived at Botany Bay just days after the First Fleet in 1788. Most other streets in Daceyville are also named after the First Fleet, such as Cook Avenue, Boussole Road, Endeavour Road, Solander Road, and Banks Avenue.

== Demographics ==
In the 2021 Census, there were 3,885 people in Pagewood. 64.0% of people were born in Australia. The next most common countries of birth were Greece 2.9%, China 2.8%, England 2.3%, Indonesia 2.1% and New Zealand 1.7%. 63.3% of people spoke only English at home. Other languages spoken at home included Greek 8.3%, Mandarin 3.4%, Indonesian 2.7%, Cantonese 2.1% and Spanish 1.9%. The most common responses for religion were Catholic 31.6%, No Religion 22.5%, Eastern Orthodox 14.3%, Anglican 7.6% and Judaism 5.0%.

== Education ==
Pagewood Public School is located in Page Street

== Sport and recreation ==
A number of well-known sporting teams represent the local area. One of them is the well known NRL club named the South Sydney Rabbitohs and Botany Rams some other teams are Pagewood Botany Soccer Club, Botany Golf Club, Bonnie Doon Golf Club, Eastlake Golf Club and The Lakes Golf Club.

== Notable residents ==
- Marele Day, author
- Harry Finch, rugby league player
- Kristina Keneally, politician
- Ed Rigney, rugby league player
- Charlie Teo, neurosurgeon
- Matt Thistlethwaite, politician
- Arnold Traynor, rugby league player
- Mario Fenech, rugby league player

== Gallery ==
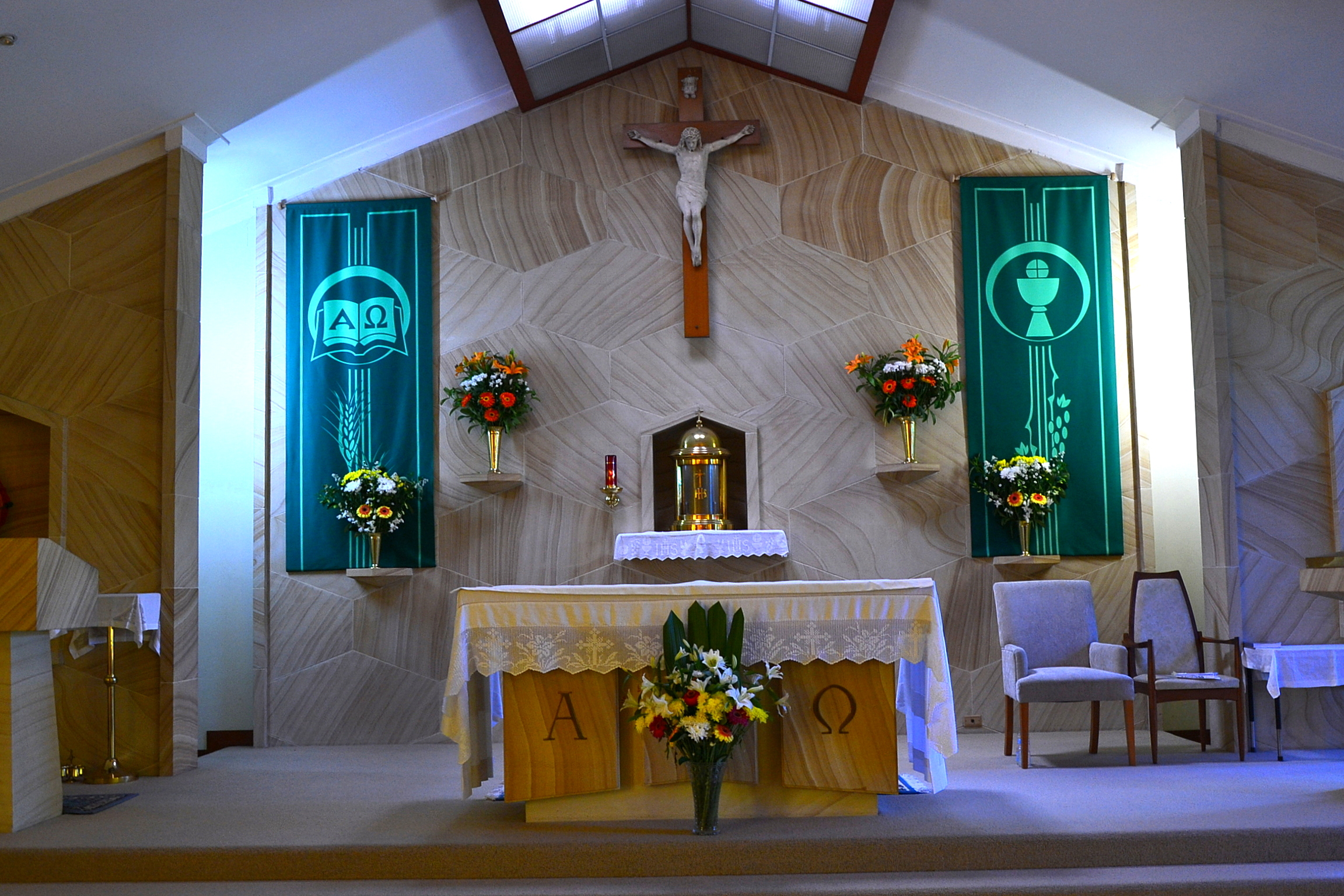
Our Lady of the Annunciation Catholic Church

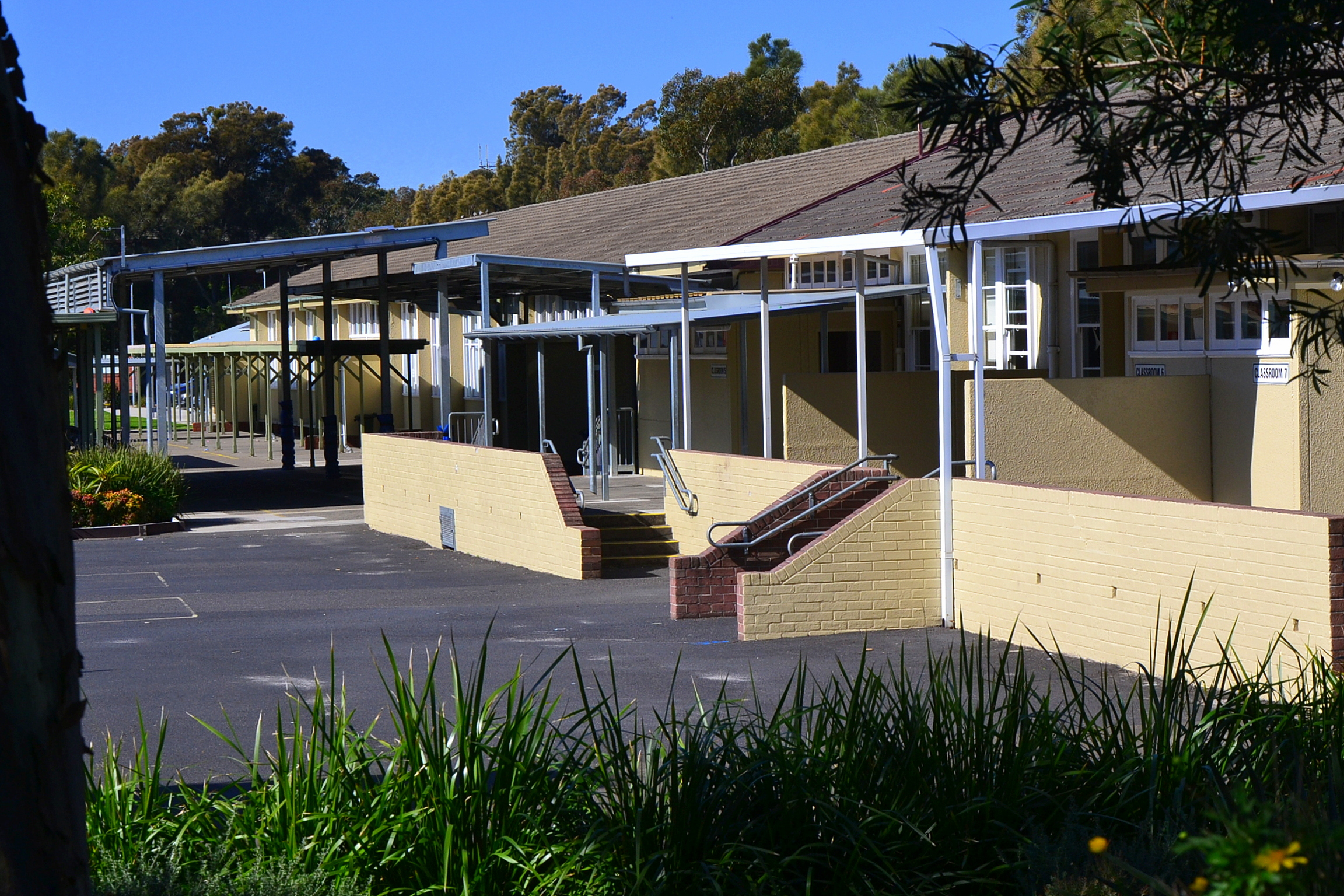
Pagewood Public School

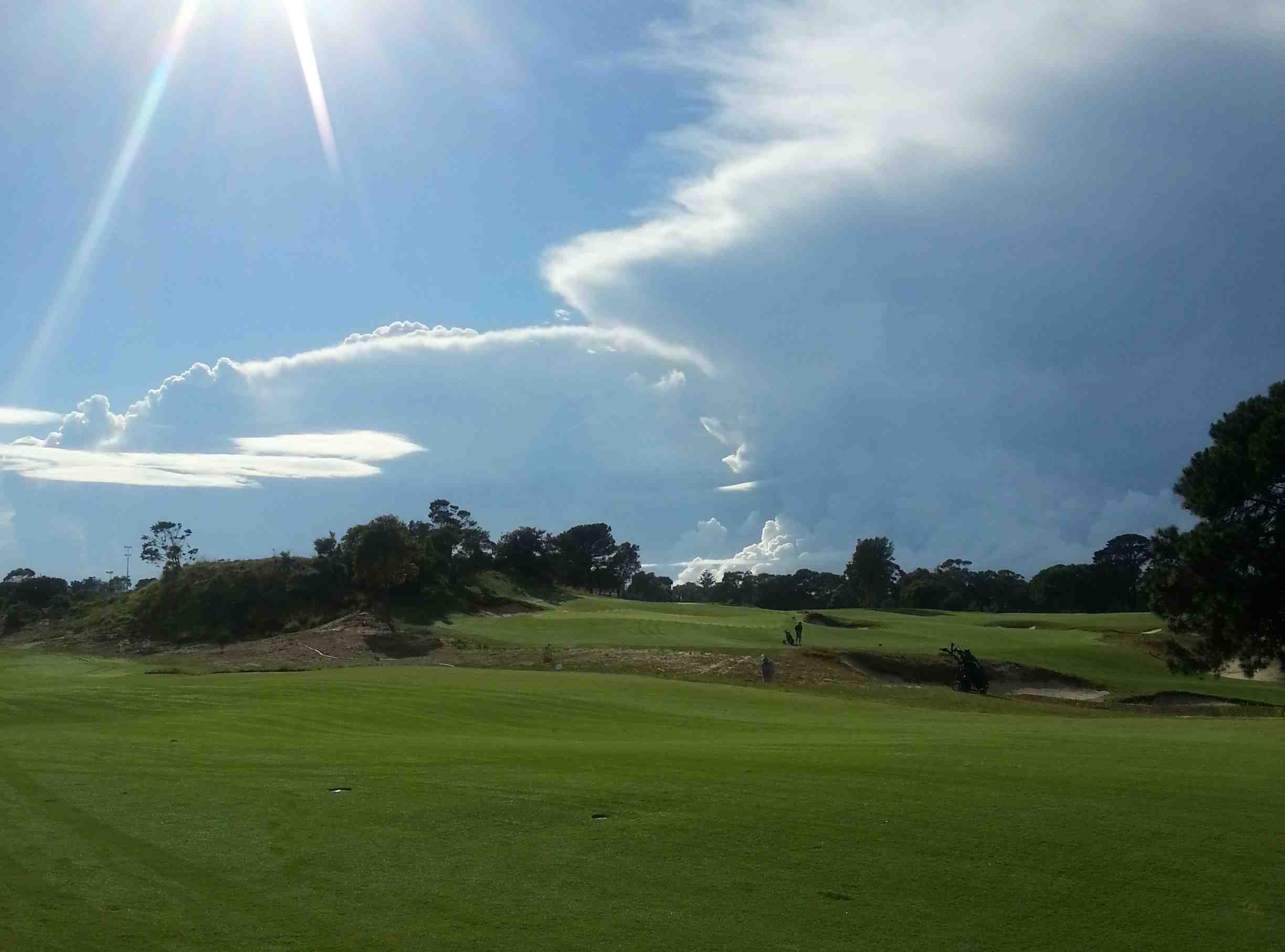
Bonnie Doon Golf Club

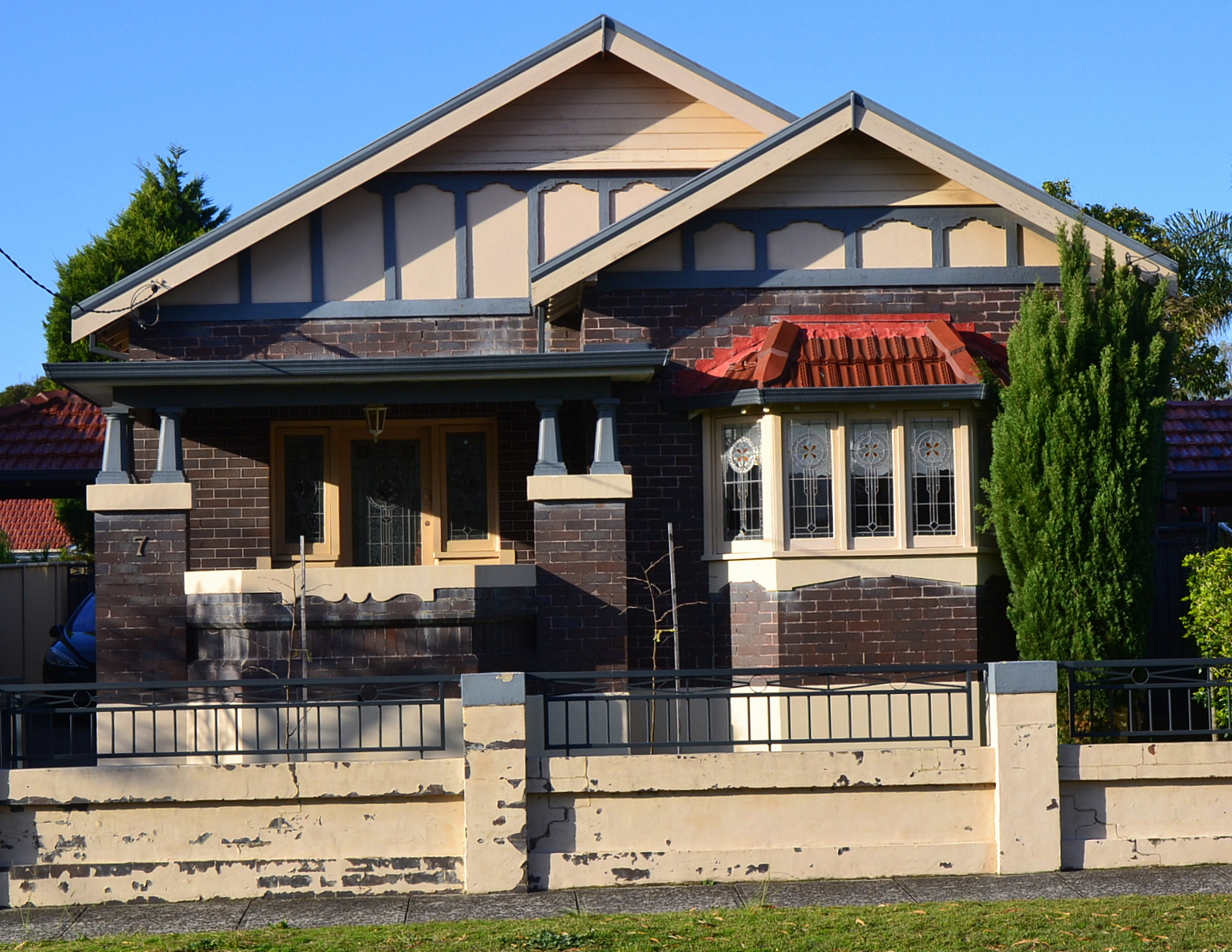
California Bungalow, Towner Gardens

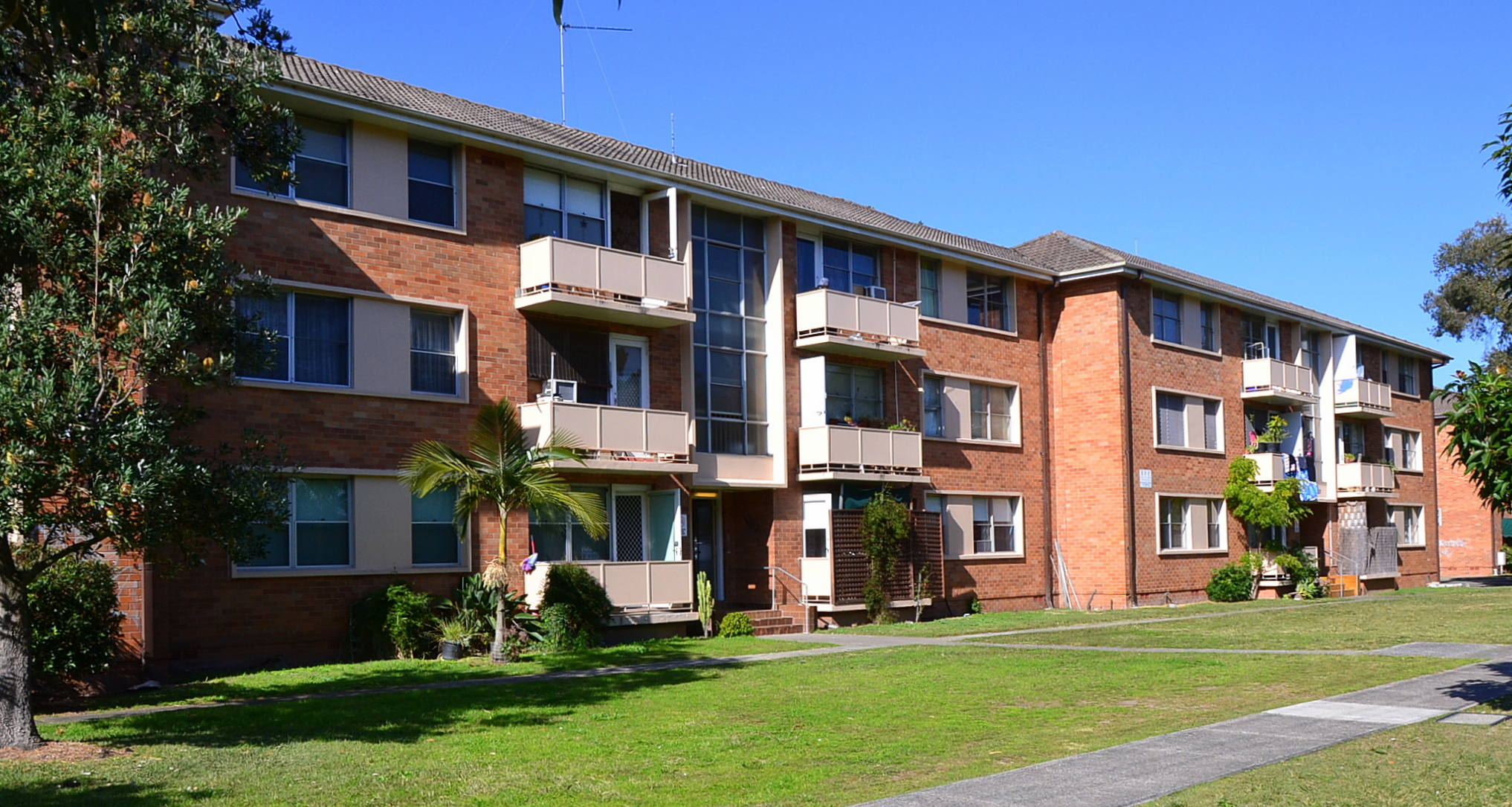
Public housing, Banks Avenue
