= NQL =

NQL may refer to:

- NQL Inc., a former name for Alpha Microsystems
- nql, the ISO 639-3 language code for Ngendelengo
- NSW Quidditch League
