= Botany Sands Aquifer =

Aquifer in New South Wales, Australia

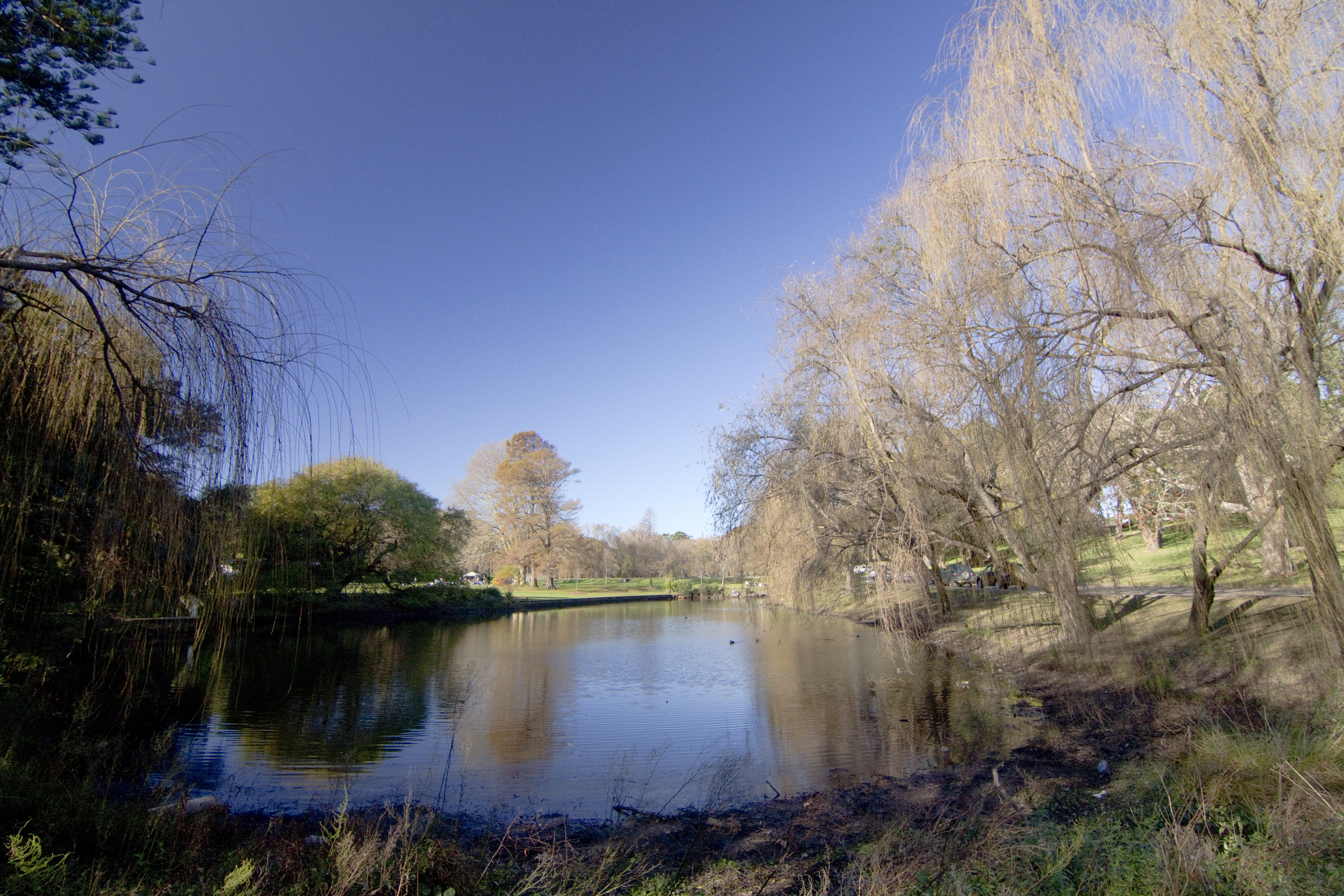
- Pond at Centennial Parklands, which flows into the aquifer

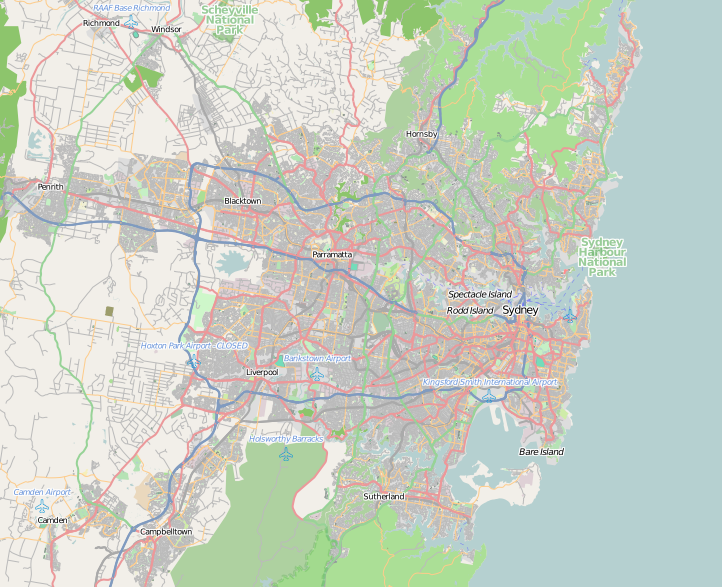
- Location: Australia
- Coordinates: 33°56′S 151°13′E
- Type: Aquifer
- Max. length: 9 km (5.6 mi)
- Max. width: 7.7 km (4.8 mi)
- Surface area: 141 km^{2} (54 sq mi)
- Average depth: 50 m (160 ft)

The Botany Sands Aquifer is an aquifer that surrounds Botany Bay just south of Sydney, New South Wales, Australia. A former main water source for Sydney, it stretches from Centennial Park south east of Sydney CBD into Botany Bay to the south. The aquifer is chiefly filled by rainfall, some contributions from irrigation, seeping service mains and flow from the subjacent bedrock units.

== Description ==
The aquifer is a stratum of sand filled with groundwater which heads six kilometres downstream and is reloaded by rainwater pouring through sand and sandstone which act as natural filtrates to get rid of solid litter, silt and noxious nutrients. The salinity contains 500 milligrams per litre (mg/L) of melted solids. The aquifer is large, where it approximately contains 300 litres of water per cubic metre of sand, though only about 6,000ML/yr is portioned for use. The groundwater assist natural and manmade pond systems along its motion path, which exist in Centennial Park, the Royal Randwick Racecourse and ponds golf courses including Eastlakes and Mill Pond.

=== Geology ===
There exist two groundwater systems: one within the bedrock successions of the Hawkesbury Sandstone and the other in the superimposed and loose sedimentary material, termed the BSB (Botany Sand Beds), which predominate the sedimentary array of the Botany Basin. Water levels vary between 0 and 25 metres beneath the surface, with the bulk of the geological Botany Basin exhibiting a mean depth of around 9 metres. The BSB has an average thickness of approximately 20 metres, with depths up to 53 metres in paleochannels engraved in the basement rocks. The sand beds are subordinated by clay and clay-rich quartz sand lenses and a primary unit consisting of fluvial and aeolian processed sands with gravel lenses.

== Use ==
=== Historic ===
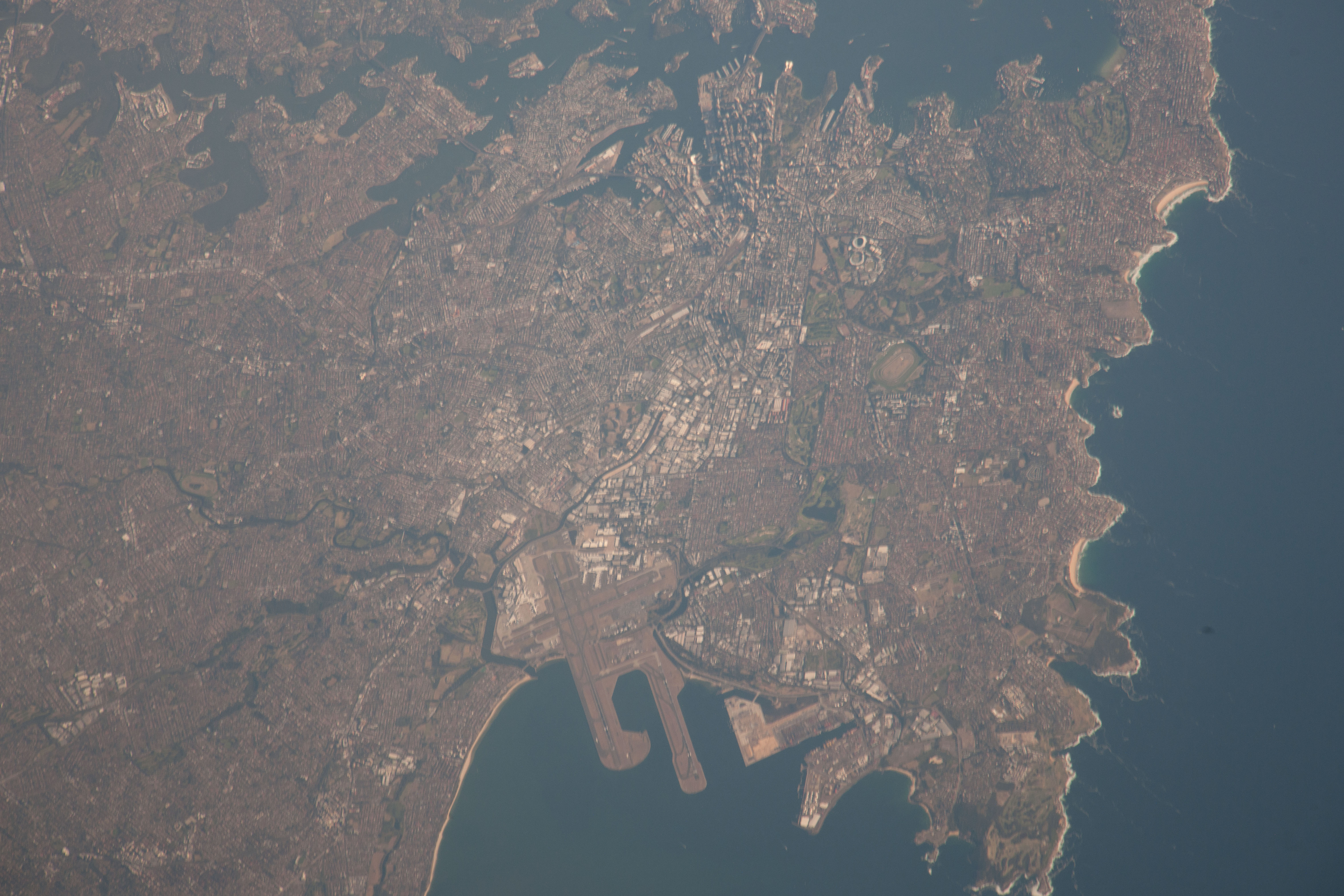
The aquifer is situated beneath the region surrounding the Botany Bay

Before European settlement, the aquifer was an essential source of water for the aboriginal communities. In April 1770, Lieutenant James Cook and Sir Joseph Banks both discovered indigenous "huts" on the northern boundary of the bay and heaths which ascended to high sandy ridges. In 1815, a wool factory was constructed, adjoining the ponds north of Botany Bay, in addition to other industries being built in vicinity for their contaminated waste to enter the surface water and the groundwater.

=== Present ===
Today, it still is a crucial source of water for parklands, public and residential gardens, industry and wetlands. Whilst the Botany Sands aquifer is still a key source of groundwater in Sydney’s Eastern Suburbs, the increasing use of land above the aquifer for industry, golf courses and garden watering, among other things, have caused the groundwater to become contaminated due to the industrial pollutants and is therefore unsafe for drinking. However, the aquifer's northern end beneath Centennial Park still retains pure water quality.

== See also ==
- Botany Water Reserves
