= Quadball in Australia =

Quidditch, also known as Quadball, in Australia is played by a mixture of university and community teams. Due to the geographic demographics of the country, most major competitive tournaments are held in the eastern states. There are currently over 30 registered teams in the country.

== Organisations ==
Quadball Australia
- Australian Quadball Association logo
- Formation: 2011 (15 years ago)
- Affiliations: IQA
- Website: quidditchaustralia.org

Quadball in Australia is governed by Quadball Australia (formerly Quidditch Australia and the Australian Quidditch Association), a non-profit organisation founded in 2011 as a Facebook group intended to act as a network for quidditch teams and players within Australia to communicate with one another. It is managed by a board of seven directors on a rotating 2-year term system with further volunteer staff, and currently chaired by Luke Derrick. Quadball Australia is affiliated with the International Quadball Association. Quadball Australia uses the IQA rulebook for official gameplay, with some minor exceptions.

Quadball Australia manages the membership and insurance of all players in the country, in addition to managing the country's most prolific tournaments such as the Australian Quadball Championships (previously QUAFL) and State Shield. Regular club seasons are managed by their respective state bodies: Quadball New South Wales (which also manages quidditch in the Australian Capital Territory), Quadball Victoria, Queensland Association of Quadball, South Australian Quadball Association and Western Australian Quadball Association.

== National team ==
The Drop Bears are the Australian national team, named after the folklorian koala-like species. The Drop Bears competed at the inaugural 2012 IQA Cup (then called the Summer Games), the first world-wide quadball competition where they came in third out of five teams. They defeated reigning champions The United States in 2016 with a score of 150*–130. Despite being tipped to win the cup again in 2018, the Australian National Team competed in Italy finishing 5th, defeated by the United States in the early stages of the semifinals.

Competition	Position
(United Kingdom) 2012 Summer Games	3rd of 5
(Canada) 2014 Global Games	2nd of 7
(Germany) 2016 World Cup	1st of 21
(Italy) 2018 World Cup	5th of 29
(Republic of Ireland) 2022 European Games	3rd of 20
(United States) 2023 World Cup ^{†}	7th of 15

^{†} The 2020 World Cup was initially postponed to 2021 due to COVID-19, and further postponed to 2023.

== Competitions ==
=== Australian Quadball Championships (QUAFL) ===
The Australian Quadball Championships, previously and sometimes still colloquially known as QUAFL is the biggest quadballtournament in Australia. It is held annually in November/December, crowning the Australian national club champion for that year. The first official name for the tournament was the Oceania Regional Championships, but was more affectionately known as "QUAFL" which was later given the backronym "Quidditch United Australian Federated League". The inaugural tournament was held in 2011 at the University of New South Wales, starting with just 5 teams.

Clubs from across the country bid to host the tournament every year, and the tournament was hosted by Sydney-based clubs until 2015, when it was hosted by Melbourne's Monash Muggles. In 2016 and 2017, the tournament saw a move to the Australian Institute of Sport in Canberra, hosting a record high of 25 teams in 2017. The championships were hosted in Queensland for the first time in 2018, and were last held at Kayess Park, Minto in 2019, before being cancelled both in 2020 and 2021 due to COVID-19 restrictions at the time.

The structure of the tournament traditionally changes each year depending on the number of registered teams and choices of organisers. More recently, teams have been randomly split into pools based on their respective end of season state rankings, with top teams from each pool progressing to elimination bracket play.

The 2020 Championship due to be hosted in the Gold Coast or USC, and the 2021 Championship due to be hosted at La Trobe University, were cancelled due to the COVID-19 Pandemic.

==== Australian Quadball Club Championship (AQCC) results ====
Note that an asterisk (*) signifies a snitch catch.

Year	No. of teams	Location	National Champion	Runner-up	Grand Final score
2011	5	Kensington, NSW	UNSW Snapes on a Plane	University of Western Sydney Thestrals	90-60*
2012	10	Macquarie Park, NSW	University of New South Wales Snapes on a Plane	Newcastle Fireballs	80*-30
2013	12	Parramatta, NSW	Perth Phoenixes (WA)	Macquarie Marauders	110*-70
2014	13	Macquarie Park, NSW	Melbourne Manticores (VIC)	UNSW Snapes on a Plane	110*-40
2015	19	Clayton, VIC	Melbourne Manticores (VIC)	UNSW Snapes on a Plane	100*-10
2016	23	Australian Institute of Sport, ACT	Wrackspurts QC	Western Sydney Spartans	120*-110
2017	25	Australian Institute of Sport, ACT	Whomping Willows (VIC)	Wrackspurts QC (VIC)	150*-100
2018	24	Sippy Downs, QLD	Melbourne Manticores	University of Sydney Unspeakables	120*-70
2019	20	Minto, NSW	Monash Muggles	Melbourne Manticores (VIC)	130*-120
2022	13	Bundoora, VIC	North Sydney Nightmares	Sunshine Coast Scorpions	150*-110

=== State Shield ===
State Shield (previously Quidditch State of Origin after the football tournament of the same name), is an annual Australian quadball competition established in 2016 as part of a skills camp training exercise at the annual QuidCamp. The tournament was created due to an increasing need for a state-based tournament, however as the majority of the players resided in Queensland, New South Wales, and Victoria (due to Australian geographical demographics) these are the only states to currently compete in the tournament.

Participating state teams include Victorian Leadbeaters (A), Victorian Honeybeaters (B), New South Wales Bluetongues (A), New South Wales Bluebottles (B), and the Queensland Thunderbirds.

==== Past State Shield results ====
Year	Winning team	Location
2016	Victorian Leadbeaters	Berry
2017	Victorian Leadbeaters	Brisbane
2018	New South Wales Bluetongues	Newcastle
2019	New South Wales Bluetongues	Sandringham
2022	New South Wales Bluetongues	Maroochydore

The 2020 and 2021 State Shields were cancelled due to COVID-19 pandemic.

=== NSW Quidditch League (NQL) ===
Organised by Quidditch New South Wales, the NQL (previously known as Triwiz) is the year long state championship in Sydney and surrounding cities, which started in 2011 and was formalised when the Quidditch NSW state body was created. The competition was split into 2 divisions in 2018, and currently contains 14 teams across Sydney, Wollongong, Newcastle and Canberra.

Year	Division 1 Winner	Division 2 Winner
2014	University of New South Wales Snapes on a Plane	
2015	Western Sydney Spartans / UNSW Snapes on a Plane^{†}	
2016	University of Sydney Unspeakables	
2017	Sydney City Serpents	
2018	University of Sydney Unspeakables	University of Sydney Unbreakables
2019	Sydney City Serpents	UNSW Snapes on a Plane
2020*	–	
2021*	–	
2022	Darlinghurst Dragons	

† Due to inclement weather and injuries, both teams agreed not to play the Grand Final and share the 2015 state title.

* Due to COVID-19, tournament did not proceed and only friendly matches were played.

=== Victoria Cup ===
Organised by the Quadball Victoria, the Victoria Cup is the year long state championship in Melbourne. The inaugural cup in 2014 was won by the Monash Muggles, and followed on from other local tournaments.

Year	Division 1 Winner	Division 2 Winner
2013/14	Monash Muggles	
2015	Melbourne Manticores	
2016	Melbourne Manticores	
2017	Whomping Willows	
2018	Whomping Willows	
2019	Monash Muggles	Monash Mudbloods
2020*	–	
2021*	–	
2022	Melbourne Manticores	

* Due to COVID-19, tournament did not proceed and only friendly matches were played.

=== Midwinter Cup ===
The Midwinter cup is held annually in Newcastle featuring both teams from NSW and interstate. The 2014 winners were the UNSW Snapes on a Plane. In 2015, the tournament was won by the hosts, the Newcastle Fireballs. In 2016, a vastly outnumbered Australian National University and University of the Sunshine Coast collaboration team, the ANUSC Dement-Owls, defeated the Newcastle Fireballs in the grand final to claim the Midwinter cup. In 2017, the winners were the newly formed Sydney City Serpents.

The Midwinter Cup was not held in the 2020 and 2021 seasons due to the COVID-19 pandemic. The 2022 Midwinter Cup was delayed due to weather, but returned in September of that year.

Year	Winning team
2012	Perth Phoenixes
2013	University of Western Sydney Thestrals
2014	University of New South Wales Snapes on a Plane
2015	University of Newcastle (Australia) Fireballs
2016	Australian National University and University of the Sunshine Coast ANUSC Dement-Owls
2017	Sydney City Serpents
2018	University of Sydney Unspeakables
2019	Sydney City Serpents
2022	North Sydney Nightmares
2023	Sydney Stir Fries

=== Melbourne Mudbash ===
The Melbourne Mudbash is held annually in the middle of the year in Melbourne. Local teams are joined by interstate teams and teams composed of mercenary players. In 2013, the Melbourne Manticores came out on top of the four local and two other teams competing, and in 2014 the Monash Muggles were the best of the six local and four other teams to compete.

=== Fantasy Tournaments ===
Held outside of the regular seasons, various fantasy tournaments across the country include Valkyries Fantasy (November), Victorian Fantasy (February), Sunshine Coast Fantasy (April), Macarthur Fantasy (January), and Pink Up Campbelltown Charity Tournament (October).

=== Australian Wheelchair Quidditch Championships (QWAFL) ===
Wheelchair quadball was first introduced into regular quadball tournaments in 2012, and ran at the same time and venue as the regular championships. Due to the logistical difficulties and lack of interest, the competition has not run since 2016.

Year	Winner	Runner-Up	Grand Final score
2012	ANU Nargles	JCU Galleons	40* - 20
2013	UWS Thestrals	Newcastle Chariots of Fire	220* - 10
2014	UWS Thestrals	Perth Phoenixes	160* - 20
2015	Western Sydney Spartans	UTS Opaleyes	120* - 50
2016	Western Sydney Spartans	UTS Opaleyes	90* - 60

== Teams ==
There are several teams/clubs registered with Quadball Australia across all states and territories except Northern Territory. As of 28 May 2023 there are 24 teams registered with Quadball Australia.

=== Current Teams ===
Club	Moniker	State	Home venue	Est.	State League	QUAFL	
Club	Moniker	State	Home venue	Est.	State League	Championships	Most Recent
ANU Owls	Owls	Australian Capital Territory	Fellows Oval, ANU	2011	NQL	0	—
Darlington Dragons	Dragons	New South Wales	—	—	NQL	0	—
Eastern Sydney Universities	Dawnbreakers/ Nightbringers	New South Wales	Physics Lawn, UNSW & Rowland Park	2020	NQL	2	2012
Macarthur Weasleys	Weasleys	New South Wales	Thomas Acres Reserve, Ambarvale	2013	—	0	—
Macquarie Marauders	Marauders	New South Wales	Sports Fields, Macquarie University	2012	NQL	0	—
North Sydney Nightmares	Nightmares	New South Wales	—	2019	NQL	1	2022
South West Horntails	Horntails	New South Wales	Victoria Park, Minto	2017	NQL	0	—
Sydney City Stirfries	Stirfries	New South Wales	—	—	NQL	0	—
University of Newcastle	Fireballs	New South Wales	Oval 4 UoN, Callaghan	2009	NQL	0	—
University of Sydney	Unspeakables	New South Wales	Victoria Park, Camperdown	2012	NQL	0	-
Valkyries	Valkyries	New South Wales	Queen Elizabeth Park, Concord	2019	NQL	0	—
QUT	Lycans	Queensland	Circle of Palms, City Botanic Gardens	2011	-	0	—
Sunshine Coast Scorpions	Scorpions	Queensland	Rugby Feild 2, USC	2022	QSL	0	—
University of Queensland Dumblebees	Dumblebees	Queensland	Guyatt Park, St Lucia	2016	QSL	0	-
UniSC Wraiths	Wraiths	Queensland	Sunshine Coast, Sunshine Coast	2024	QSL	0	—
Sunshine Coast Gorgons	Gorgons	Queensland	Sunshine Coast, Sunshine Coast	2024	QSL	0	—
Sunshine Coast Foxes	Foxes	Queensland	Sunshine Coast, Sunshine Coast	2024	QSL	0	—
Adelaide Augureys	Augureys	South Australia	Bonython Park	2015	-	0	—
Melbourne Ravens	Ravens	(Victoria (state)) Victoria	—	2018	Vic Cup	0	—
Monash Muggles	Muggles	(Victoria (state)) Victoria	Campus Park, Monash University, Clayton campus	2012	Vic Cup	1	2019
South Melbourne Centaurs	Centaurs	(Victoria (state)) Victoria	Fawkner Park, South Yarra	2014	Vic Cup	0	—
Melbourne Manticores	Manticores	(Victoria (state)) Victoria	—	2011	Vic Cup	3	2018
Curtin Chimeras	Chimeras	Western Australia	Gochean Park, Bentley	2012	—	0	—
Murdoch Mandrakes	Mandrakes	Western Australia	Lower Bush Court, Murdoch University	2012	—	0	—
Perth Phoenixes	Pheonixes	Western Australia	Kenwick	2011	—	1	2013
UWA Undesirables	Undesirables	Western Australia	Oak Lawn, UWA	2017	—	0	—

=== Past Teams ===
Previously other teams/clubs were registered with Quadball Australia, Listed here are the teams that are no longer registered. Clubs with teams that are no longer registered are also listed.

==== Australian Capital Territory ====
- Australian National University Owls (formerly ANU Nargles)

==== New South Wales ====
- Eastern Sydney Universities (a merger of UTS Opaleyes and UNSW Snapes on a Plane)
  - Dawnbreakers
  - Nightbringers
  - Daywalkers
- Hills Hippogriffs^{†}
- Illawarra Unregistered Animagi^{†}
- Southern Snidgets^{†}
- University of New South Wales Snapes on a Plane^{†}
- University of Sydney
  - Unforgivables
  - Unbreakables
  - Unspeakables
- University of Technology Sydney Opaleyes^{†}
- University of Western Sydney Thestrals^{†}
- Western Sydney Spartans^{†}
- Wollongong Warriors (University of Wollongong)^{†}

==== Queensland ====
- Griffith University Grindylows^{†}
- James Cook University Galleons^{†}
- University of the Sunshine Coast
  - Dementors
  - Nifflers

==== South Australia ====
- Flinders Fantastic Beasts
- Glenelg Gargoyles

==== Victoria ====
- Basilisks Quidditch Club
- La Trobe University Trolls^{†}
- Melbourne Unicorns
  - Blue
  - Orange
- Monash University
  - Muggles
  - Mudbloods
- Whomping Willows Quidditch Club

==== Western Australia ====
- ECU Centaurs

† Developing team, non-official, not currently competing or defunct
