= Arnold Traynor =

Australian rugby league player

Anaud "Arnold" Traynor
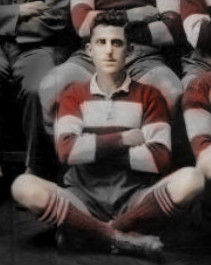
- Anaud "Arnold" Traynor. 1927

Personal information
- Full name: Anaud John Traynor
- Born: 14 June 1896 Bathurst, New South Wales, Australia
- Died: 29 July 1976 (aged 80) Pagewood, New South Wales, Australia

Playing information
- Position: Five-eighth
Club
Years	Team	Pld	T	G	FG	P
1922–30	St. George	97	28	46	1	176
Representative
Years	Team	Pld	T	G	FG	P
1926	Metropolis	1	0	0	0	0

Arnott John 'Arnold' Traynor (1896–1976) was an Australian rugby league player who played in the 1920s and 1930s. He was a foundation player in the formative years of the St. George club and later captained St George's first grade premiership team.

== Background ==
Traynor was born in Bathurst, New South Wales to parents John and Rose Traynor in 1896. The family moved to Sydney when Arnold was a young boy and he learned to play rugby league in the St Peters, New South Wales area. He played his junior football in the St. George area for Bexley Waratahs and made his first grade premiership debut for the newly formed St. George DRLFC during the 1922 NSWRFL season. Married at 19 to Lillian Freebody.

== Playing career ==
He played eight seasons for St. George between 1922-1928 and 1930. He is remembered as one of the early members of the St George team, playing in the club's formative years with others such as Herb Gilbert and Clarrie Tye. Traynor was captain of the team during the mid-1920s and right up until the 1930 final series in Snowy Justice's absence He played in the infamous match known as the Earl Park Riot on 11 August 1928 as well as St George's 1930 Grand Final loss to Western Suburbs on 4 Oct 1930.

== Death ==
Traynor died at his Pagewood, New South Wales home on 29 July 1976, aged 80.

Traynor seated 2nd row, 2nd from left in 1930
