= Rowland Park (New South Wales) =

Park in Sydney, Australia

- Interactive map of Rowland Park
- Location: Banks Avenue, Daceyville New South Wales, Australia
- Nearest city: Sydney
- Coordinates: 33°55′53″S 151°13′39″E
- Area: 6.8 hectares (17 acres)
- Created: 1927
- Operator: Bayside Council
- Open: 24 hours
- Status: Open all year
- Public transit: : n/a; : n/a; : Route #342; : Juniors Kingsford

Rowland Park is a 6.8-hectare (17-acre) public park in the Eastern Suburbs of Sydney, New South Wales, Australia.

Rowland Park is located in the heritage suburb of Daceyville.

== Features ==
Rowland Park is a mixed-use public park, and has a playground, outdoor gym, cricket pitches, sports fields, change rooms and public toilets.

== History ==
Rowland Park was formally created as a public recreation reserve in 1927, and is named after the namesake of Daceyville, John Rowland Dacey.
