= Astrolabe Park =

Park in New South Wales, Australia

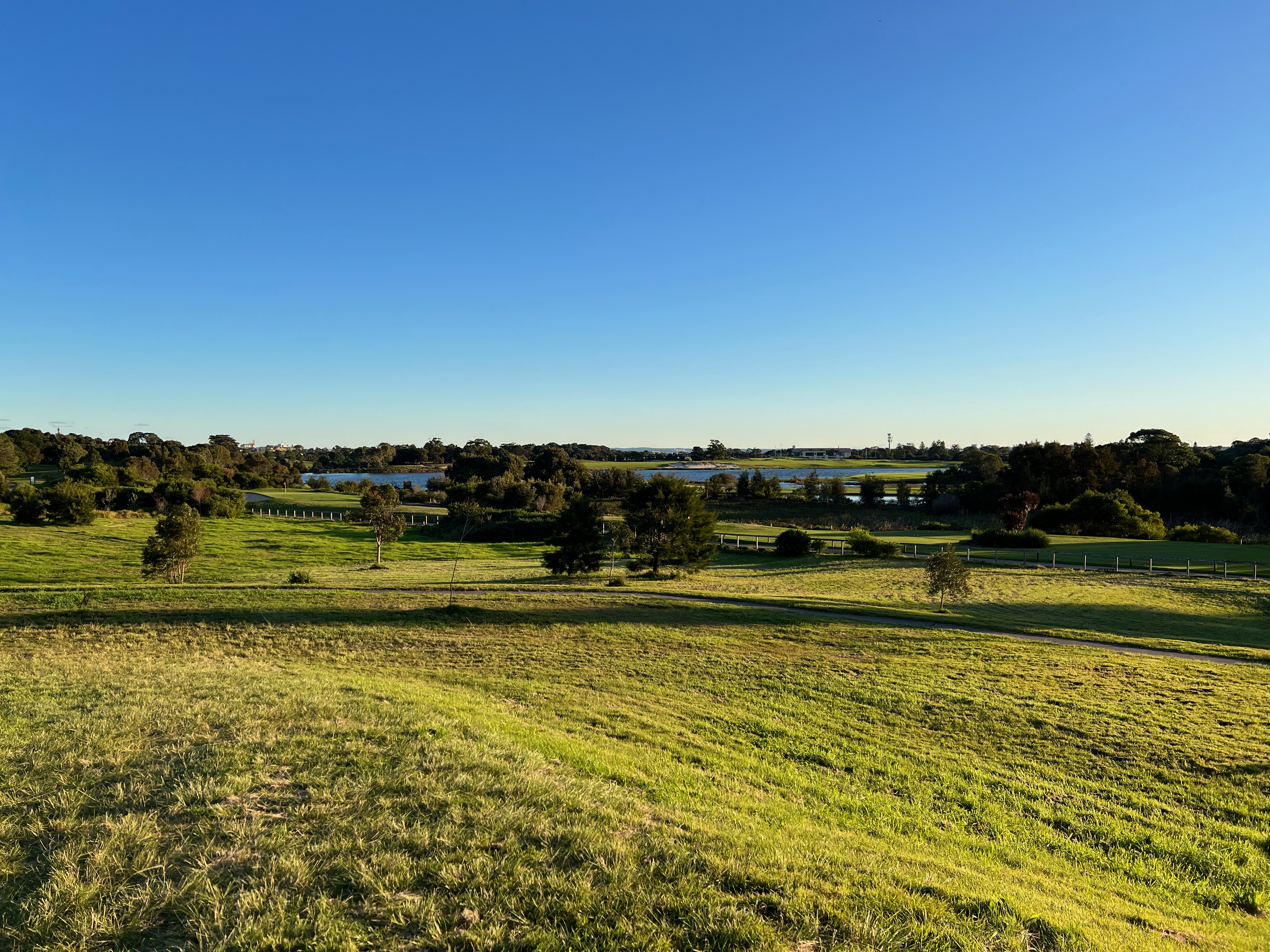
- View from Astrolabe Park looking towards the Botany Dams
- Interactive map of Astrolabe Park
- Location: Astrolabe Road, Daceyville New South Wales, Australia
- Nearest city: Sydney
- Coordinates: 33°55′46″S 151°13′21″E
- Area: 9.17 hectares (22.7 acres)
- Created: 1934
- Operator: Bayside Council and Sydney Water
- Open: 24 hours
- Status: Open all year
- Public transit: : Route #342; : Juniors Kingsford

Astrolabe Park is a 9.17-hectare (23-acre) public park in the Eastern Suburbs of Sydney, New South Wales, Australia.

Astrolabe Park is located south-east of Sydney CBD in the heritage suburb of Daceyville, and the park is also part of the heritage listed Botany Water Reserves.

== Features ==
Astrolabe Park is a public park with a half basketball court, walking track, and public toilets. The entire park is also an off-leash area for dogs.

In the south-west corner of Astrolabe Park there is a viewing area of the Botany Dams, with a plaque illustrating the aquifer system which runs underground from Centennial Park to Botany Bay.

== History ==
Astrolabe Park was formally created as a public recreation reserve in 1934. In the 1910s, when Daceyville was initially being constructed, the parklands were a swamp.

Astrolabe Park is named after the French ship Astrolabe, which explored Botany Bay in 1788, just a few days after the arrival of the First Fleet.

Astrolabe Park was partly used as a municipal landfill site for the City of Botany Bay beginning in 1938 and continuing intermittently until 1978. The area was also mined for sand throughout the 1950s and 60s.

In 1979, Botany Council constructed public tennis courts at Astrolabe Park and at Mutch Park. However, the tennis courts at Astrolabe Park were removed in the early 1990s and replaced with a half basketball court.

In the 1980s and 1990s, Astrolabe Park had a BMX track. Remnants of the track remain in the northwest corner of the park.

In 2026 Bayside Council published a master plan for Astrolabe Park, which had been promised since at least as far back as 2016. The plan included restoration of the BMX pump track and replacement of the half basketball court with a full court, along with other additions such as a playground and exercise equipment.

== Community ==
Friends of Astrolabe Park is a local community group formed to help protect and improve Astrolabe Park.

== Controversies ==
In 1992, the NSW State Government wanted to perform sand mining at Bonnie Doon Golf Club, and a proposal was made to give all the land at Astrolabe Park to Bonnie Doon Golf Course so that they could build 6 more golfing holes there. Botany Council objected to this proposal, saying that "the permanent alienation of any section of Astrolabe Park clearly would adversely affect the recreational usage of the park by community and particularly the schools in the area". Botany Council also commented that Astrolabe Park should be protected and preserved as it was "well located to provide pedestrian access to residents of Daceyville without the necessity of crossing major roads".

In 2015, Football NSW proposed building a synthetic field at Astrolabe Park to be used for soccer games. This plan was abandoned.

In 2017, Sydney Water was considering transferring ownership of Astrolabe Park to Bayside Council, and the council was developing a new master plan for the park. However, Bayside Council never released a master plan for Astrolabe Park, and Sydney Water has retained ownership of the park.

In 2018, the University of New South Wales tried to redevelop Astrolabe Park into privately owned sporting fields, in a consortium with Cricket NSW and AFL NSW. This plan was abandoned after widespread opposition from the local community.

Also in 2018, a separate proposal was made by the Sydney International Beach Volleyball Centre Consortium, to build a private volleyball stadium at Astrolabe Park. Meredith Wallace of Bayside Council describe this proposal as "unbelievably terrible", and this plan was also abandoned.

In 2022, the University of New South Wales and NSW Rugby proposed holding public rugby matches with 5,000 attendees at the adjacent and privately operated David Phillips Field, and using the grass at Astrolabe Park as a parking lot for those matches. Their application was refused by Bayside Council, and refused again on appeal. NSW Rugby lodged another appeal in November 2023, this time to the Land and Environment Court of New South Wales. However, in 2024, Bayside Council made a deal with NSW Rugby and informed the Land and Environment Court about the deal, which the court approved.

== Gallery ==
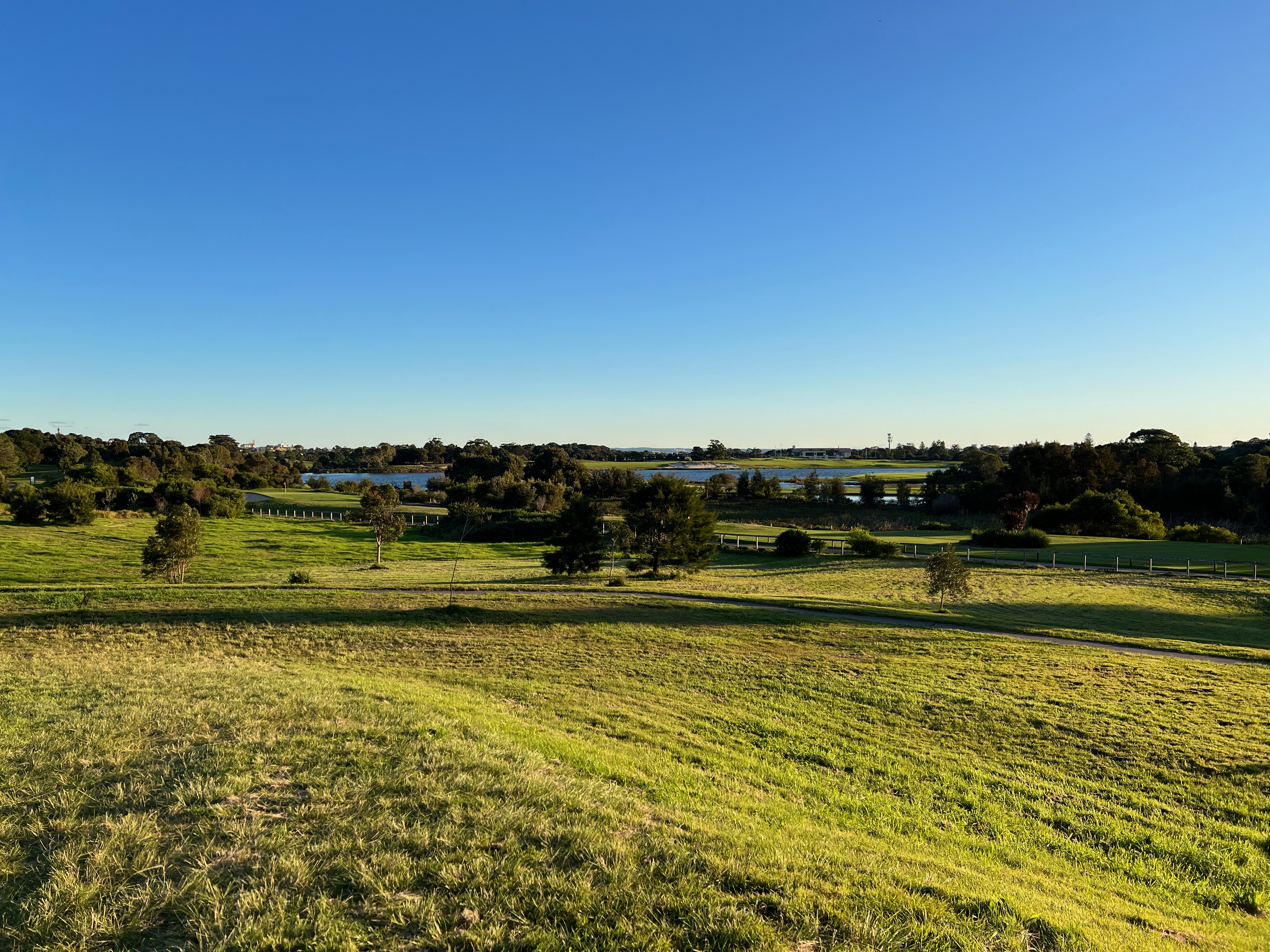
View from Astrolabe Park looking towards the Botany Dams

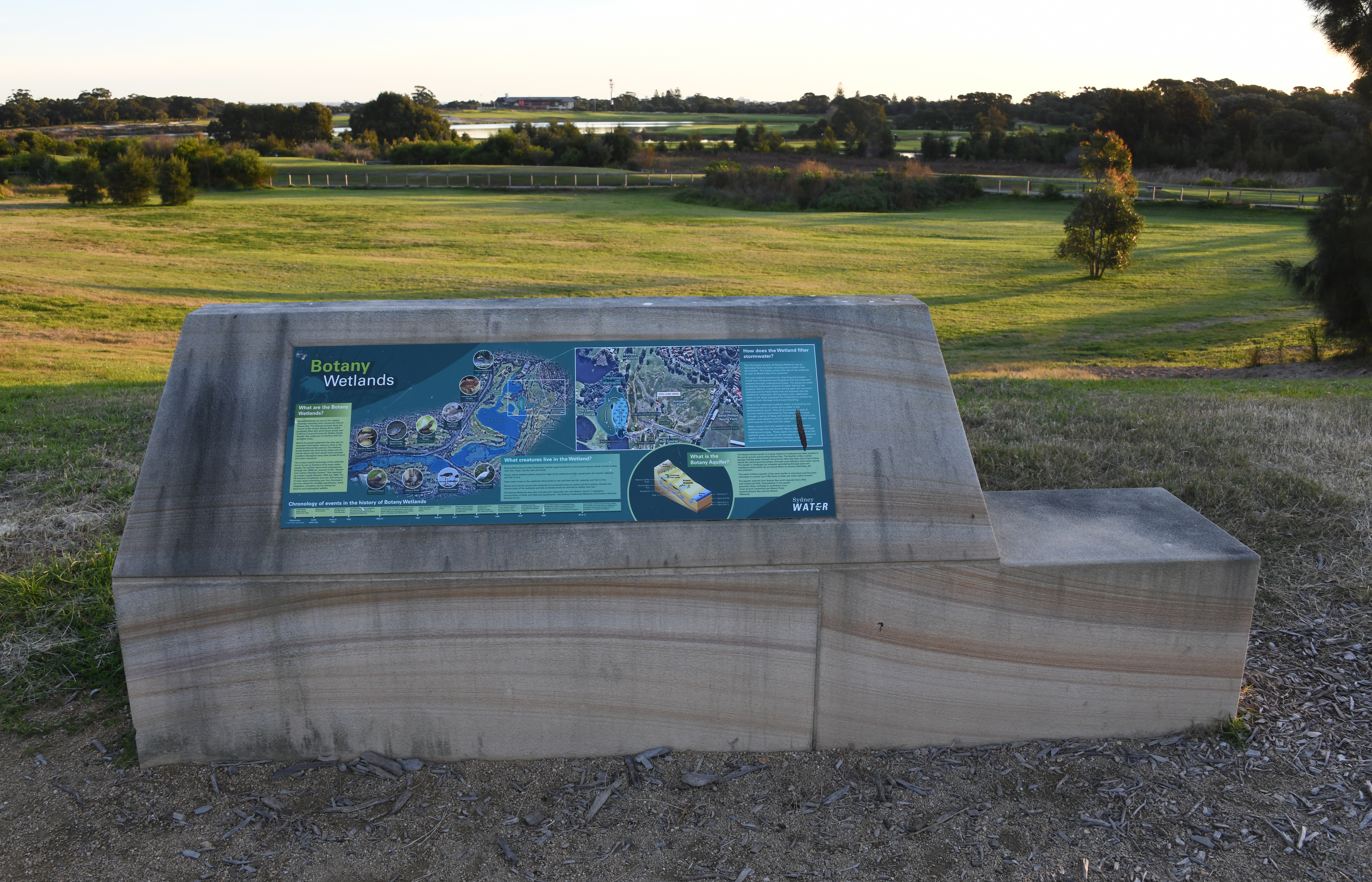
A plaque in Astrolabe Park illustrating the aquifer system which runs underground from Centennial Park to Botany Bay.

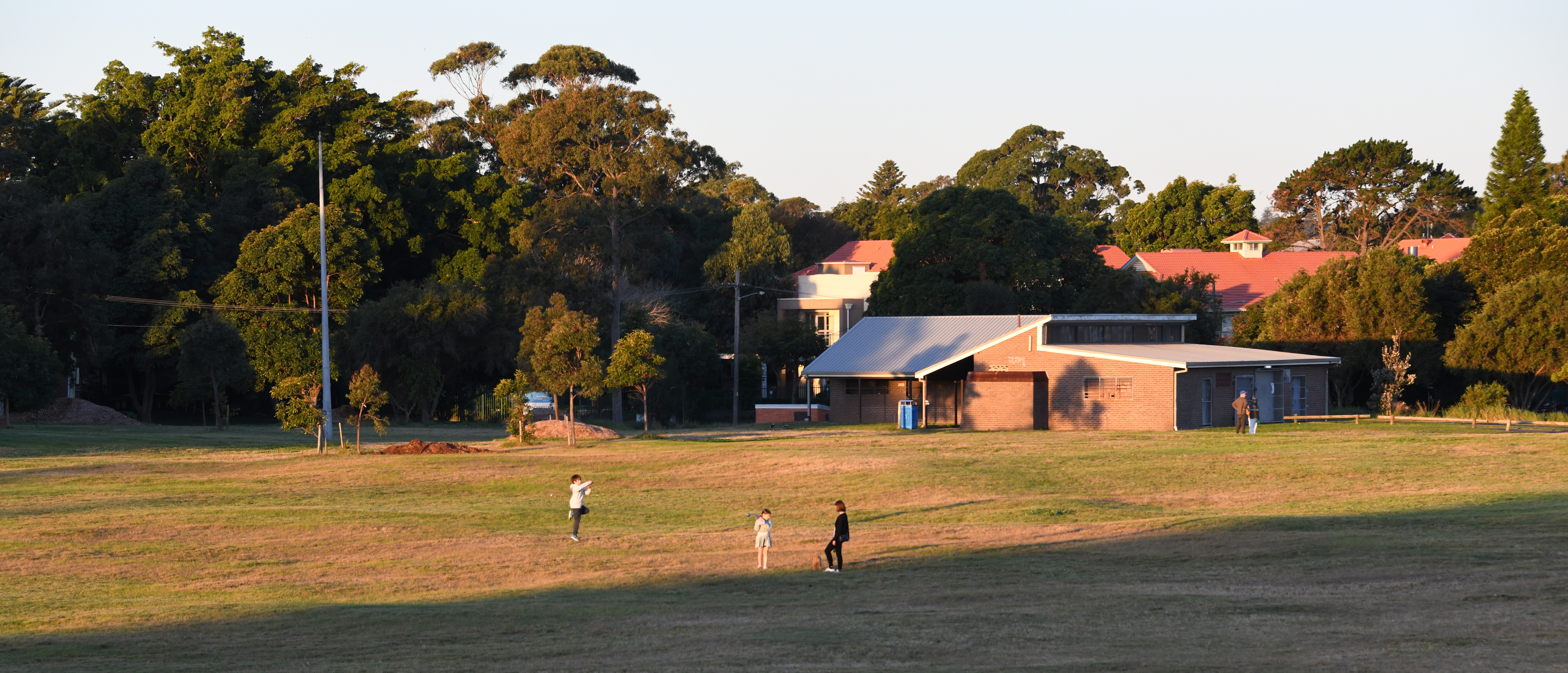
A family playing in Astrolabe Park

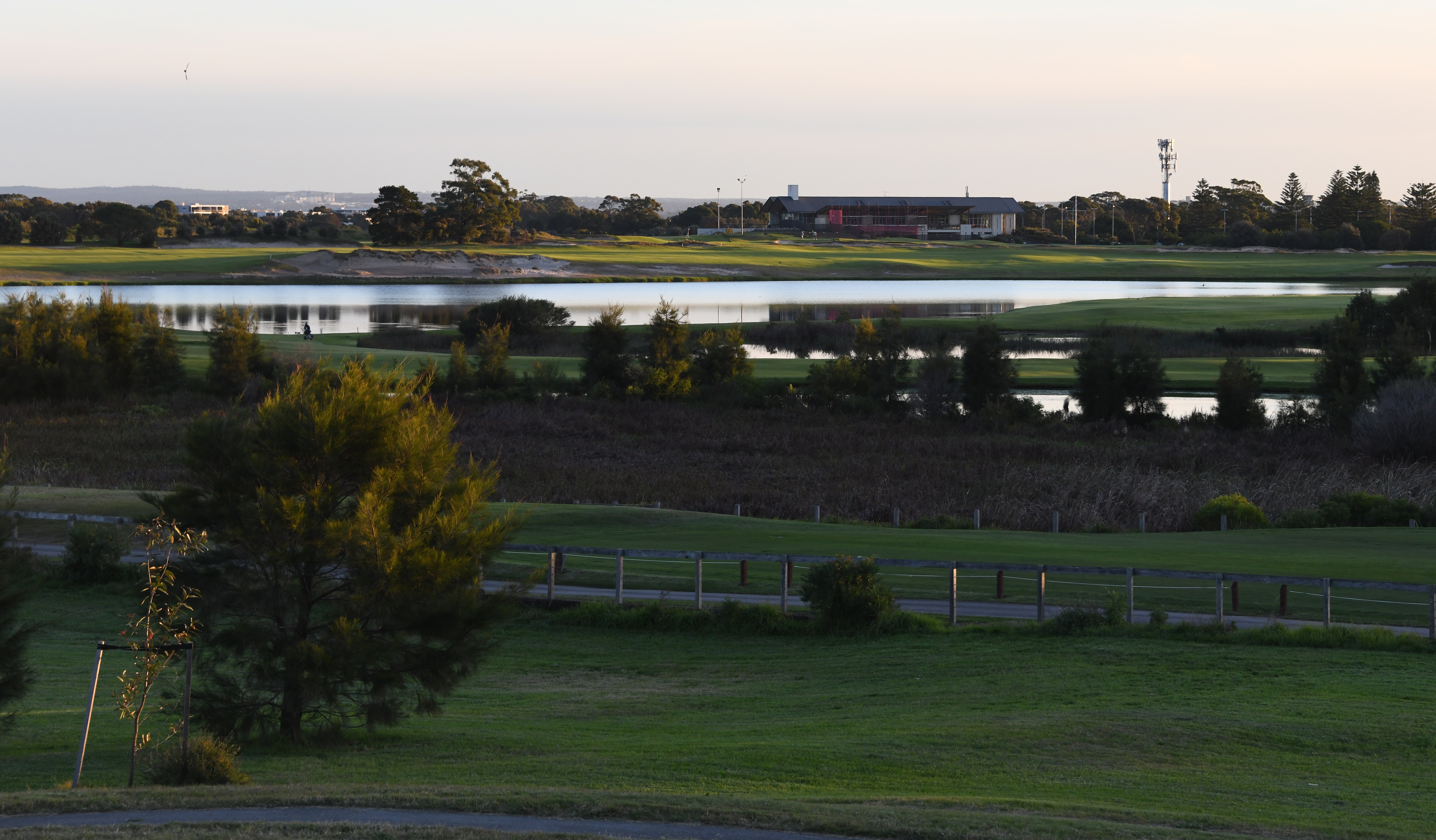
Zoomed view of The Lakes Golf Club from Astrolabe Park
