= Botany Water Reserves =

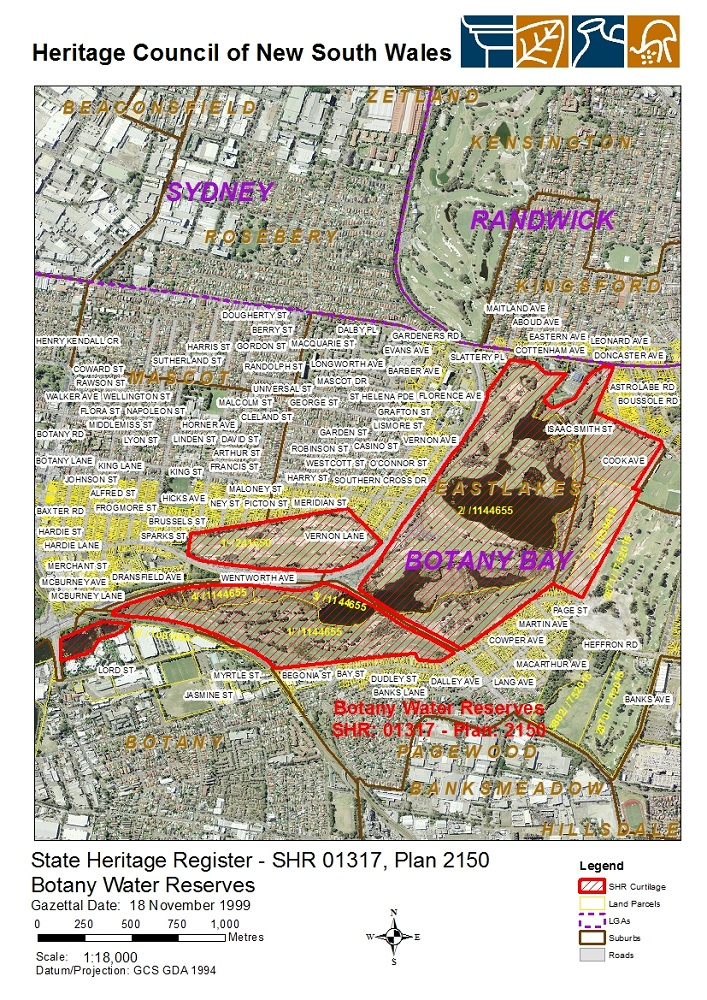
- Heritage boundaries

- Location in greater Sydney
- 33.9355°S 151.2122°E
- Location: 1024 Botany Road, Mascot, Bayside Council, New South Wales, Australia

History
- Built: 1815–1870

Site notes
- Architects: City Engineers: W. B. Rider; E. Bell (1856–1871); Francis Bell (1871–1878)
- Owner: Sydney Water

New South Wales Heritage Register
- Official name: Botany Water Reserves; Botany Swamps; Botany Wetlands; Mills Stream; Bridge Pond; Lakes Golf Course; Eastlakes Golf Course; Bonnie Doon Golf Course
- Type: State heritage (landscape)
- Designated: 18 November 1999
- Reference no.: 1317
- Type: Historic Landscape
- Category: Landscape – Cultural
- Builders: Convicts for Simeon Lord (1815)

The Botany Water Reserves is a heritage-listed area that was historically used as part of Sydney's water supply system. It is located at 1024 Botany Road, Mascot, New South Wales, Australia. The site is now reserved as parkland, also containing a golf course. It was designed by City Engineers, W. B. Rider, E. Bell (1856–1871), and Francis Bell (1871–1878). It is also known as Botany Dams, Botany Swamps, Botany Wetlands, Mill Stream, Bridge Pond, The Lakes Golf Club, Eastlakes Golf Course, Bonnie Doon Golf Club, and Astrolabe Park. The property is owned by Sydney Water, an agency of the Government of New South Wales. It was added to the New South Wales State Heritage Register on 18 November 1999.

== History ==
On 29 April 1770 Captain James Cook made his first landfall in Australia at Botany Bay. The botanist, Sir Joseph Banks, and his Swedish assistant, Daniel Solander from Cook's ship HMS Endeavour, spent several days ashore collecting vast numbers of previously unknown plants. Cook was in two minds about a suitable name for the Bay – his journal first refers to it as Stingray's Harbour, then as Botanist Bay, then both were crossed out and the present Botany Bay inserted, no doubt because of Banks and Solander's work. Since its name comes from the Bay on which it stands, Botany can well claim to have the oldest English place name in Australia.

Cook's recommendation and Banks' enthusiasm were largely responsible for the British Government's decision to found a penal settlement at Botany Bay. When Governor Phillip arrived in mid-summer in 1788 however, he found the harbour shallow and exposed, and the shore swampy and lacking sources of fresh water. As a result, the First Fleet sailed on to Port Jackson, finding a more suitable site for settlement at Sydney Cove.

Botany was first planned as an agricultural district, and the principal industry was to be market gardening. Instead it became an industrial area, boasting a fellmonger's yard and a slaughter works. As early as 1809, Mr E. Redmond came to settle in the district, but the first important developer was Simeon Lord (1771–1840), who built a fulling mill in 1815 on the site that later became that of the old water works. In 1823 he received a grant of 600 acres (240 ha), followed by further grants. Part of the estate was subdivided by 1887. Lord, the "merchant prince of Botany Bay", manufactured fine wool cloth, and was also one of the merchants instrumental in the founding of Sydney Hospital. He gave land for the sites of two early churches in Botany, and Lord Street is named after him. Banksia Street, Sir Joseph Banks Park and Booralee Park all commemorate those early days.

The Sydney Water Works were established in Botany in 1858 and were fed by the many springs in the area. In 1886, the last year of full pumping, 1864 million gallons of water were supplied to Sydney from these water works. Although the scheme was Sydney's major source of water for 30 years, it did not supply water in the Botany area and local residents depended on natural sources and tanks.

Following European colonisation the first substantial interventions in the area occurred in 1815 when the enterprising merchant Simeon Lord had a dam constructed to the west of the present Botany Road for the purpose of establishing the colony's first woollen mill. A second dam was constructed near the present Engine House ruins for a flour mill. This mill continued operating until about 1847 while the textile factory was closed by about 1856.

From 13 July 1855 the City Council began resuming land around, and including, the Botany wetlands for the city's main water supply scheme – the first time land resumptions were made for this purpose. (The land was transferred to the Water Board in 1888.) Of this land about 75 acres of Lord's estate was resumed which included his house (demolished in the 1930s though the site of which is in the vicinity of the present heliport), the mill sites, various cottages and the earthworks associated with Lord's mill dams.

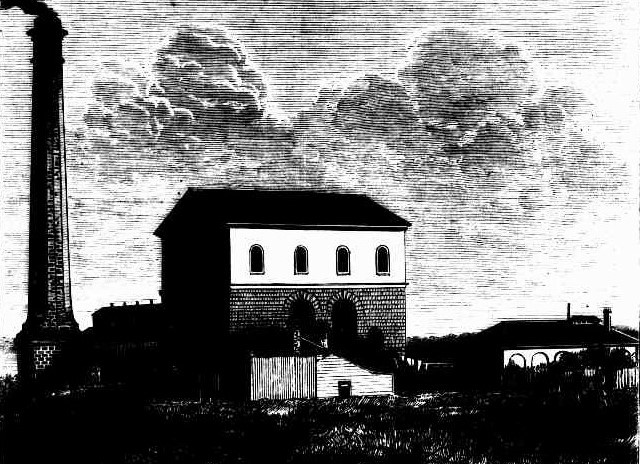
Engine House c.1872. The base of the chimney remains at the site.

The initial water supply scheme of the mid-1850s, by the City Engineer W. B. Rider, was abandoned with the appointment of Edward Bell to the position. The surviving Engine House and chimney date from the implementation, in the late 1850s, of Bell's scheme while the stone retaining walls for the Engine Pond and outlet sluice probably date from the 1870s work on the Engine Pond augmentation. Between 1866 and the mid-1870s six dams were constructed, and reconstructed for various reasons, from the Mill Pond to Gardeners Road using piling of sheet timber facing filled with sand forming a core of a turfed bank. In 1859 a 30" sand-cast iron main was completed between the Engine House and the Crown Street reservoir. The pipes were made in Scotland in 1856 and machined with such remarkably fine tolerance that, of the total length of 4 miles (6.4 km), the outside diameter varied by only 6mm and allowed the pipes to be laid without jointing material. Part of this easement coincides with the present study area in the vicinity of the Engine House.

Drawing on a 1982 thesis of Margaret Simpson, the Thorp et al. study indicates that about 80 trees – "Norfolk Pines, Moreton Bay Figs, Weeping Figs, Sweet Scented Pines and Stone Pines" – were planted along the access road from Botany and elsewhere on the site in 1869. Works for the augmentation of water storage at Botany continued throughout the 1870s including the addition of water stored in the Bunnerong Dam (1876–1877) by way of a pipe to the No 4 Pond. The then Bunnerong Road was moved and ran along the top of this dam wall.

By the early 1880s the Upper Nepean Scheme was well underway and in November 1886 the Nepean-supplied water effectively ended the general supply of Sydney's water from the Botany system. Even intermittent emergency use of the system ceased by 1893 so that the Engine House machinery was finally decommissioned with pumping equipment and boilers sold at auction in 1896. In 1894 various local industrial uses – such as wool scourers and tanners – were permitted to return to the wetland vicinity through leases until 1947.

While these major improvement programs for Sydney's water supply were being put into place it also became clear – chiefly from an increasingly polluted harbour – that substantial works were needed to deal with the sewage of Sydney and its immediate suburbs. After the Board of Water Supply and Sewerage was formed in 1888 the basis of what is presently Sydney's largest sewerage system was commenced. As part of its responsibilities the new Board assumed control of various recent works of the Public Works Department, one of which was the first of the new sewer mains from the City to the Botany Sewage Farm established about 1886. Another main was added in 1898 which linked various western suburbs to the Sewage Farm. However, by the turn of the century the usefulness of the Farm was fast diminishing such that the southern and western sewerage systems were amalgamated and extended, from 1909, to a new ocean outfall at Malabar while the much expanded Botany Sewage Farm was closed. This work – known as the Southern and Western Sewer Ocean Outfall System or, usually, SWSOOS No 1 – was completed in 1916 under the direction of Chief Engineer EM de Burgh.

Further growth of Sydney's suburbs and resultant extensions to this sewerage network necessitated an augmentation of the system, by duplication known as SWSOOS No 2, during 1936 to 1941. Both mains were required to cross the Cooks River by inverted syphons. The current SWSOOS network represents Sydney's largest sewerage system and envelops mains that were constructed from the 1880s through the 1890s, 1900s, 1910s to 1940s. Other individually significant components of the SWSOOS network that occur in the vicinity of the present site include the twin major inverted syphons and syphonic overflows (now under Sydney Airport) and the 1896 sewer vent at West Botany Street, Arncliffe.

Within the site the existing engine house chimney was retired for water supply use in 1888, left unused for 28 years then, after being shortened, re-used as a vent in 1916 as part of the work for the new SWSOOS. Various buildings, associated with the new sewerage system, were added to the west. During the 1940s the chimney was further truncated to its present height along with the diversion of the mouth of the Cooks River into Botany Bay and substantial filling of the Engine and Mill Ponds as part of a major expansion and upgrade of airport facilities. From the 1970s a greater appreciation of the special historical and environmental values of the place was apparent through the commissioning of a range of studies to record and assess its significance. However further incursions continued with the 1988 construction of Southern Cross Drive through the middle of the Engine Pond, reclamation by the DMR and more recent works associated with the pre-Olympics upgrade of the airport.

=== The Lakes Golf Club (1928) ===
In 1928 construction of a clubhouse near Gardeners Road was commenced for the Lakes Golf Club with the course – to the west and north of the chain of ponds – opening in 1930.

About 1960 the Eastlakes Golf Club was established with an 18-hole course on the eastern and southern side of the ponds. The neighbouring course to the northeast, The Australian Golf Club, was established in 1904 and in the same year it was host for the first Australian open golf title which was won by Michael Scott. Both the Lakes and Australian golf courses have been consistently ranked in the top five golf courses in New South Wales for many years.

The Lakes Golf Club practice precinct (east of the club house) was excavated on a number of occasions from 1928 to 1970. In the early 1970s the south-eastern area of this land was bulldozed and redeveloped as part of the overall golf course design as a direct result of the state government requiring some of the golf course land to construct Southern Cross Drive. This included extensive excavation of the area of the practice precinct of the golf course. In the mid-1970s some of the practice precinct area formed part of the tennis court construction which required bulldozing the area to prepare the ground for new tennis courts. This was conducted as part of construction of the golf course clubhouse.

In the early 2000s the practice precinct was renovated as part of a plan to improve course facilities for practice, and to have the course fit with the natural contours and appearance of the sandy dunes and lakes that dominate its site. This included extensive disturbance of the practice precinct area. In 2005 a new club house was built and this resulted in removal of the tennis courts. The practice precinct and some of the driving range tee was bulldozed to remove the tennis courts and then construct the practice chipping area.

From 2007–09 the entire Lakes Golf Course underwent a comprehensive renovation which included extensive construction works to the south-western section of the practice precinct area. This involved use of a bulldozer and other construction equipment to construct the 10th tees and the area in front of them. This included the small ridge between the driving range tee and the front of the current 10th hole tees.

== Description ==
This item consists of an extensive tract of open space/parkland, with 58 hectares (140 acres) of wetlands, including Sydney Airport, The Australian Golf Course, Lakes Golf Course, Eastlakes Golf Course, Bonnie Doon Golf Course, Astrolabe Park, and Mutch Park. Other areas of wetlands in the vicinity are substantially smaller in extent – the Eve Street wetlands, Arncliffe (south of Kogarah Golf Club) and the chain of ponds in Sir Joseph Banks Park, Botany.

Important surviving elements of non-indigenous heritage include remnants of the water supply Engine House and chimney (late 1850s) (no longer owned by Sydney Water); spillway/weir, remnants of the Engine and Mill Ponds; the sequence of ponds between the Mill Pond and Gardeners Road; 1915 Sewer Pumphouse; twin sewer syphons and easements; partial evidence of old Cooks River edge (evident through comparing early and recent aerial photography; 1869 plantings of Norfolk Island pines (Araucaria heterophylla), Moreton Bay fig trees (Ficus macrophylla) and Port Jackson fig trees (Ficus rubiginosa). Given the period, important government institutional use and the choice of tree species there is strong circumstantial evidence for the involvement of Charles Moore – Director of the Royal Botanic Gardens (1848–1896) in advising on these plantings. Canary Island date palms (Phoenix canariensis) also survive near the Engine Pond and may be remnants – or progeny – of 1910s plantings associated with the reuse of the site for the main southern sewer system. There is likewise strong circumstantial evidence for the involvement of Joseph Henry Maiden – Director of the Royal Botanic Gardens (1896–1924) in recommending the choice of these plantings.

A comparison of current aerial photographs and the Sydney Water Commission's 1869 topographic plan of the Lachlan Swamp from No 6 Dam to Botany Bay shows that there is a substantial degree of correlation between the layouts of many of the dams. Despite the bisection of the Engine Pond by Southern Cross Drive, it is still possible to appreciate the basic outline of the earlier pond. A similar observation holds for the former Bridge Pond as the present Mill Pond and the western half of the "New Pond" retain the earlier basic form. The embankment separating the Mill and New Ponds preserves part of the alignment of the old Sydney-Botany road (shown on the 1869 SWC plan) with its tollhouse site just south of the embankment. (Archaeological evidence of the former tollhouse may still exist.) The present Nos 1 and 2 Ponds closely reflect the earlier form of the 1869 No 1 Pond while most of the present Nos 3a, 3 and 4/5 Ponds almost exactly retain the earlier form of the 1869 Nos 2, 3, 4 and 5 Ponds respectively. The northern part of the old No 6 Pond has been filled. Generally, the present wetland layout retains a close indication of the original 1860s dam forms. Earlier pond formations existed some decades before, and were absorbed into, this system however surviving evidence is difficult to discern from both (non-intrusive) site inspections and an analysis of aerial photography. Archaeological investigations – if ever required – may reveal evidence of these early 19th-century structures.

A "Plan of the Botany & Lachlan Watersheds" signed by Francis Bell in June, 1875 shows that the Lachlan Water Supply (Centennial Park) links with the Botany Pond system as does the area of land containing the present Australian Golf Course.

Several remnant areas of the famous and now rare Eastern Suburbs Banksia Scrub (still featuring the trademark Grass Trees (Xanthorrhoea resinosa) as well as various communities of reed and sedgeland species are represented within the open space boundaries. Other important indigenous vegetation vestiges include areas of Paperbark swamp featuring Melaleuca quinquenervia, marshland and wet heath and large areas of the aquatic herb Ludwigia.

As at 21 May 2004, major elements (the sequence of ponds) of Sydney's third main water supply system are substantially intact. Particular elements of the system – its architectural and planted elements – are only partially intact.

=== Modifications and dates ===
Although the pre-European wetland ecosystem was modified during the 1860s and 1870s pond construction, there has been only limited major modification – mainly for the expansion of the airport and construction of new arterial roadways – since then. Major elements (the sequence of ponds) of Sydney's third main water supply system are substantially intact. Particular elements of the system – its architectural and planted elements – are only partially intact. Yet the little that remains of these are particularly poignant and serve as important local landmarks.

== Heritage listing ==
Botany Water Reserve holds considerable value for Sydney and NSW because it contains the only remaining major components – substantial layout and other important physical evidence from the 1850s through to the 1870s – of the unique water supply system that supported the expansion of the Sydney metropolis for most of the latter half of the 19th century, representing Sydney's third main water supply system since colonisation; and on account of the surviving remnants of the early 19th century industries associated with the prominent emancipist merchant Simeon Lord. The site includes land which, in 1855, was the subject of the first resumptions for the purpose of a water supply system by a government in Australia. Part of the original 1850s sand-cast iron water supply pipe remains within the site representing a remnant of the State's oldest main.

This extant remnant of the water supply system also has high collective value as important evidence likewise remains of the two principal Sydney water supply systems (The Tank Stream and Busby's Bore) that predated the Botany system along with those superseding it (The Upper Canal and regional dam systems).

The open space areas encompassed by the item include two regionally rare and distinct remnant vegetation communities known as Sydney Freshwater Wetlands and Eastern Suburbs Banksia Scrub that are both potentially of State significance and are the subject of separate listings as an Endangered Ecological Community under the NSW Threatened Species Conservation Act 1995. The wetlands also have recognised regional ecological value as native animal habitat and movement corridors, and may include animal species of conservation significance.

The item is of regional environmental importance as a major recharge source for the Sydney basin aquifer.

It likely holds special interest as a landmark cultural and recreational landscape for the regional community.

It also has regional importance on account of the substantial infrastructure it consists of the 1910s Southern and Western Suburbs Ocean Outfall Sewer System- since augmented during 1936–1941 by SWSOOS No 2 – representing one of the first major separate sewers in Sydney as well as incorporating new ventilation technologies. This infrastructure includes use of the former Engine House chimney as a sewer vent, the viaduct to carry the vent pipe, Sewage Pumping Station No 38 of 1916 near the Engine House ruins and part of the SWSOOS Nos 1 and 2 mains. The overall SWSOOS network remains Sydney's largest sewer system.

Botany Water Reserves was listed on the New South Wales State Heritage Register on 18 November 1999 having satisfied the following criteria.

The place is important in demonstrating the course, or pattern, of cultural or natural history in New South Wales.

The item contains substantial remnants of structures and layout from Sydney's third main water supply system which supported the growth of Australia's largest city for most of the latter half of the 19th century. The 1850s water supply pipeline represents the oldest main in the State. The site contains important components of Sydney's main southern sewerage system from the 1910s and 1930s to 1940s supporting the expansion and consolidation of inner Sydney from the late 19th century to the present.

It also demonstrates the growth in demand for golf courses throughout the 20th century with the establishment of four separate courses including the Australian (est. 1904) and the Lakes Golf Course (est. 1928) – two of the State's oldest and most highly regarded.

The place also has strong and direct associations with prominent individuals – including Colonial entrepreneur Simeon Lord; the naval officer, surveyor and pastoralist Thomas Woore; City Engineers WB Rider, Edward Bell and Francis Bell; and Board engineers including EM de Burgh. Passing, though telling, early European references to the former landscape character of the area were made by many noted travellers including Captain James Cook in 1770 and Francois Peron in 1802.

As surviving elements of Sydney's third main water supply system it is rare if not unique.

As a modified/remnant wetland system it is representative of a once extensive vegetation community that included sites from Jewells Swamp, near Lake Macquarie to Coomaditchy Lagoon south of Sydney, yet as remnant sites within the Sydney Basin are now only of a small size and are threatened with extinction the wetlands should be considered rare. Similarly the areas of Eastern Suburbs Banksia Scrub are rare – of their total estimated area at the beginning of European colonisation less than 1% remains.

SWSOOS is rare as the largest of Sydney's sewerage networks.

Although the pre-European wetland ecosystem was modified during the 1860s and 1870s pond construction, there has been only limited major modification – mainly for the expansion of the airport and construction of new arterial roadways – since then. Major elements (the sequence of ponds) of Sydney's third main water supply system are substantially intact. Particular elements of the system – its architectural and planted elements – are only partially intact. Yet the little that remains of these are particularly poignant and serve as important local landmarks.

The place is important in demonstrating aesthetic characteristics and/or a high degree of creative or technical achievement in New South Wales.

The site represents a substantial tract of greenspace with important landscape attributes – extensive areas of water, wetlands, plantings, archaeological features, dunes, remnant indigenous vegetation and fauna – providing notable scenery and, remarkably, within 6 km of the Sydney CBD.

The place has strong or special association with a particular community or cultural group in New South Wales for social, cultural or spiritual reasons.

The large tract of open space is probably highly valued as a local or even regional asset while the uses associated with the various golf courses would likely guarantee a special interest in the wetlands landscape by patrons. The ruinous water supply structures and remnant 1869 plantings along with the 1915 sewerage Pump House are well appreciated features and function as important cultural references within the parkland associated with the remnant Engine Pond.

The place has potential to yield information that will contribute to an understanding of the cultural or natural history of New South Wales.

The place is of importance for its archaeological research potential pertaining to the early 19th century use of the wetlands for industry, Sydney's third main water supply system and aspects of Sydney's sewerage provision. Direct evidence of the construction of the original Lord dam walls, his house and outbuildings or other structures, other industrial structures and the former Sydney- Botany Tollhouse may still remain under the later fill.

The wetlands are of well recognised ecological value (flora/fauna [including benthos, zooplankton, macroinvertebrates and amphibians] habitat and corridor) and environmental value (major Sydney basin aquifer recharge).

The place possesses uncommon, rare or endangered aspects of the cultural or natural history of New South Wales.

As surviving elements of Sydney's third main water supply system it is rare.

The place is important in demonstrating the principal characteristics of a class of cultural or natural places/environments in New South Wales.

As a modified wetland system it is representative.

== See also ==
- Botany Sands Aquifer
