= US Quidditch Cup 10 =

- 2017

Tournament information
- Sport: Quidditch
- Location: Kissimmee, FL
- Dates: 8–9 April 2017
- Administrator: US Quidditch
- Tournament format(s): Pool play Single elimination bracket
- Venue: Austin-Tindall Regional Park
- Teams: 60

Final positions
- Champion: Texas Cavalry
- Runner-up: Texas St.

The US Quidditch Cup 10 was the 2017 edition of the US Quidditch Cup, a quidditch club tournament organized by US Quidditch. The tournament took place in Kissimmee, Florida from April 8–9, 2017.

The Cup featured 60 teams that qualified through eight regional championships. Each region was assigned bids according to the Huntington–Hill method, and 16 bids were assigned to regions according to their US Quidditch Cup 9 performance.

== Format ==
The 60 teams that qualified were divided into 12 pools of five teams each. Following pool play, the top three teams of each pool advanced to a 36-team single elimination bracket.

=== Bracket phase ===
* Denotes a regulation-time snitch snatch.

^ Denotes an overtime snitch snatch.

Play-in round
UTSA	120
Lake Erie Elite	220*
UCLA	160*
Skrewts	80
Central Michigan	110*
Crimson Elite	50
Miami FL	120*^
Michigan	90

Round of 32
Lone Star	180*
Lake Erie Elite	60
BosNYan	110*
Maryland	80
Lost Boys	80*
OK. St.	10
Cal	10
QC Boston	160*
Texas St.	100*
UCLA	80
Penn St.	30
DCQC	150*
BGSU	120
Ball St.	50
Ohio St.	70*
Boston	140
Texas Cavalry	140*
Central Michigan	30
AZ. St.	80
Kansas	180*
RPI	200*
Sil. Phoenix	50
Gumbeaux	190*^
Gambits	170
Mizzou	110*
Miami FL	50
Warriors	100
Texas A&M	180*
Finest	100
U. Rochester	90*
Rutgers	70
Roc. United	90*

Round of 16
Lone Star	80
BosNYan	160*
Lost Boys	30
QC Boston	90*
Texas St.	160*
DCQC	100
BGSU	110*
U. Texas	50
Texas Cavalry	140*
Kansas	60
RPI	120*
Gumbeaux	50
Mizzou	160*
Texas A&M	130*
Finest	60
Roc. United	160*

Quarter-finals
BosNYan	100*
QC Boston	70
Texas St.	100*
BGSU	60
Texas Cavalry	140*
RPI	50
Mizzou	90*
Roc. United	70

Semi-finals
BosNYan	80
Texas St.	200*
Texas Cavalry	120*
Mizzou	50

Final
Texas St.	60
Texas Cavalry	80*
