= QCB =

QCB may refer to:

- Qatar Central Bank, the central bank of Qatar
- QCB, a radio operating signal noting particular causes of delayed responses
- Qualifying corporate bond, a kind of loan note
- Quantitative & Computational Biology, often conjoined as an academic discipline
- Queen's Commendation for Bravery, UK military and civilian awards granted for bravery
- Queen Charlotte Basin, a structural basin mostly beneath the continental shelf off of Western Canada
- Queensland Country Bank Stadium, a multi-purpose stadium in South Townsville, Queensland, Australia
- Queer Campus Bangalore, a support group and safe space for queer youth in Bangalore, India
- Quick change barrel, a style of modular firearm systems allowing rapid caliber or barrel replacement
- Quick change body, a body/chassis switching system originally developed by Econ Engineering
- Quidditch Club Boston, a US Quidditch team that won the 2016 US Quidditch Cup
