= Quadball =

Sport based on the fictional game from Harry Potter

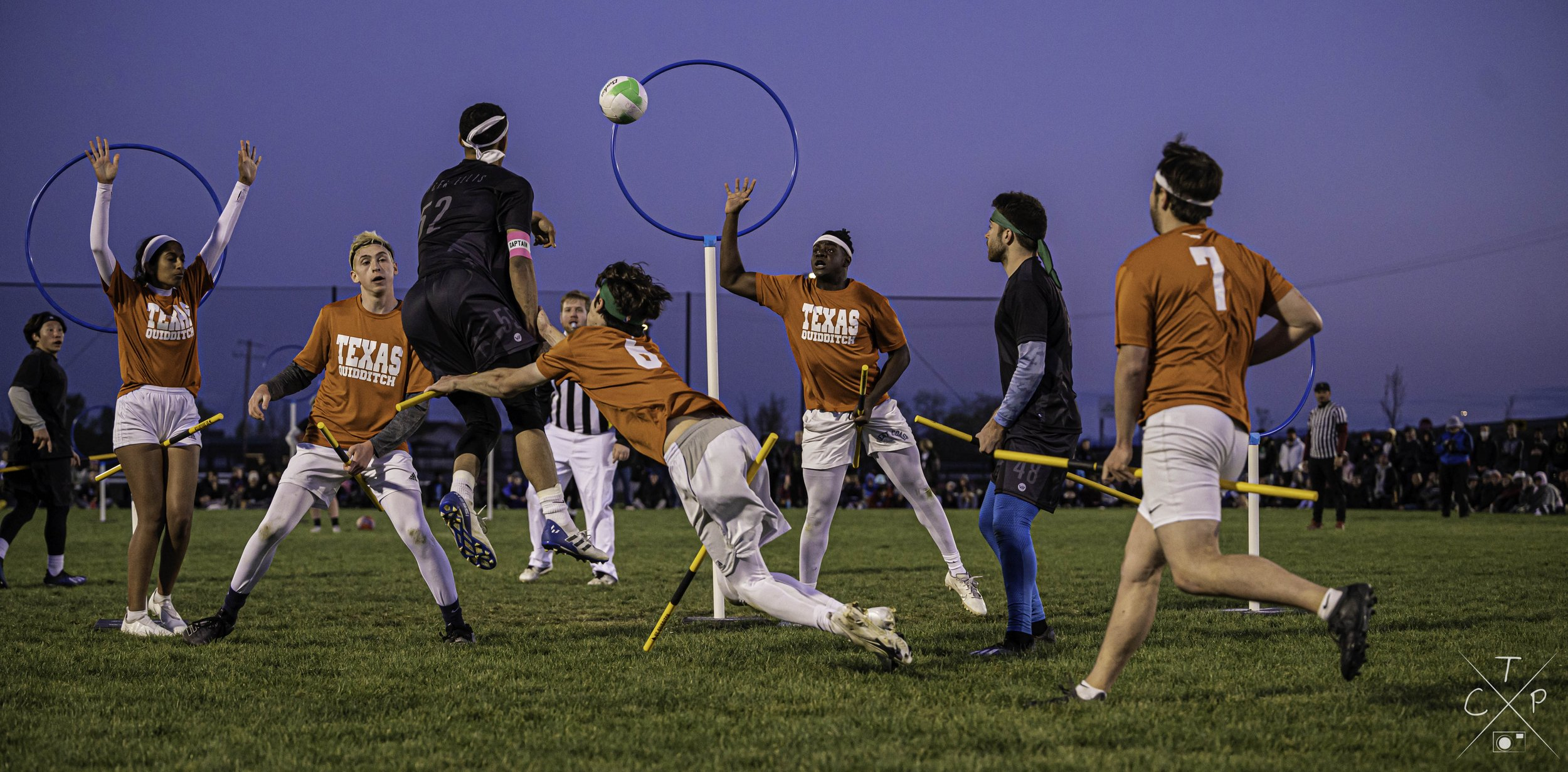
- A chaser attempts a shot at the 2023 US Quadball Cup
- Highest governing body: International Quadball Association
- First played: 2005 at Middlebury College

Characteristics
- Contact: Full
- Team members: 7 on field, 21 total on roster; 1 additional player who is not a member of either team Both teams can substitute players freely at any time behind their proper keeper zone.
- Mixed-sex: Yes
- Type: Team sport, ball sport
- Equipment: volleyball Dodgeballs; Flag (tennis ball in a cloth bag); Sticks (capped PVC pole); Hoops
- Venue: Quadball pitch (also known simply as a "pitch")

Presence
- Country or region: Universal
- Olympic: No
- Paralympic: No

Quadball is an official team sport that began as "muggle Quidditch" in 2003 and officially became Quadball in 2022. Two teams of seven players each, astride PVC pipes and opposing each other on a rectangular pitch, compete with the primary objective of passing a ball through the defenders' hoops, while preventing their opponents from passing it through their own hoops. The sport is played around the world.

Rules of the sport are governed by the International Quadball Association (IQA), and events are sanctioned by either the IQA or that nation's governing body. A team consists of a minimum of seven (maximum 21) players, of which six are always on the pitch: three chasers, one keeper, and two beaters. The seventh position, known as a seeker, joins each team after a time period known as the "seeker floor" (20 minutes under all three major rulesets). The pitch is rectangular, 66 by 36 yards (60 by 33 m), with three hoops (3, 4.5, and 6 feet (91, 137, and 183 cm)) at either end. Teams are required to be gender-balanced: each team may have a maximum of three non-seeker players who identify as the same gender on the field at one time, making quadball one of the few sports that not only offers a gender-integrated environment, but an open community to those who identify as nonbinary.

To score points, chasers or keepers must get the quadball—a slightly deflated volleyball—into any of the three opposing hoops, which scores the team 10 points. To impede their opponents, beaters can use dodgeballs to hit opposing players and temporarily remove them from play. Once hit by an opposing dodgeball, that player must dismount their stick, drop any ball being held, and return to touch their own team's hoops before re-entering the game.

The ultimate goal is to have more points than the other team by the time the flag—a tennis ball inside a cloth tube hanging from the shorts of an impartial official dressed in yellow—is caught. After twenty minutes of play, the flag runner moves onto the pitch and tries to evade the two seekers. When one of the seekers catches the flag, that team is awarded 30 points. If this leads to the catching team having more points overall than their opponents, the game ends immediately with the catching team winning. In the event a team catches the snitch but still trails in points (or is tied for points) the game goes into an overtime period, with the target being the score achieved by the non-catching team plus 30 points. The first team to reach the target score wins the game; alternatively, either team may concede at any time during the overtime period. Matches or games often run about 30 to 40 minutes including stoppages, but tend to vary in length due to the unpredictable nature of the flag catch.

Rules vary from the IQA standard in domestic competitions, most notably in the US. In games sanctioned by Major League Quadball (MLQ) and US Quadball (USQ), catching the flag results in 35 points, which help teams reach a set score, 60 (MLQ) points above the score of the leading team before the seeker floor. The first team to reach this set score wins the game.

== History ==
Quadball was originally called quidditch, and has its roots in the fictional Harry Potter sport of the same name. While versions of quidditch originate as early as 2003, the sport that would evolve into quadball was first created in 2005 at Middlebury College by Xander Manshel and Alex Benepe. It grew into its own distinct sport after ten publications of rulebooks.

In 2007, the first World Cup took place, won by Middlebury. Starting in 2008, an annual World Cup was hosted in the United States, attended by collegiate and community teams. Canada often sent several Ontario or Quebec teams, and Australia, Mexico and France each sent a team once. In 2012, the IQA hosted the Summer Games, where five nations sent national teams, and two years later, the IQA hosted the Global Games, where the United States defeated Australia for the gold medal.

In December 2021, US Quadball and Major League Quadball proposed changing the name of the sport to avoid a potential trademark dispute with Warner Bros and to distance themselves from Rowling and her views on transgender people. Names suggested include "quidball", "quadball", "quickball", "quicker", "quidstrike" and "quadraball". In July 2022, the new name "quadball" was announced, which references the game's four balls and retains 'Q' as the first letter. The International Quidditch Association also adopted the name of "quadball" at this time. Since then, "quadball" has been used to represent sanctioned versions of the sport around the world.

== Play ==
Quadball game

Each match begins with six of the starting players (excluding the seekers) along the starting line within their keeper zone with brooms on the ground and the four balls lined in the centre of the pitch. The head referee then calls "brooms up!", upon which players run to gain possession of the balls. The flag runner goes on the field at 19 minutes, and the seekers are released at 20 minutes.

Goals are worth ten points. Once a point is scored, the quadball must be given to the other team's keeper, and almost immediately returns to the offensive. Games can last any length of time longer than 20 minutes, depending on the skill and endurance of the seekers and flag runner.

The game may end after the flag has been caught through what is called a clean catch by the Flag Referee, The Head Referee, and the Flag Runner. The team that caught the flag is awarded 30 points. If the catching Team now has more points than the other, they win and the game ends immediately. If, however, they have fewer points or are tied, the game goes to overtime, with a set score of the non-catching team score plus 30 points. The winner is determined not by the flag catch, but by the number of points earned throughout the entirety of the game. Depending on the score teams will delay the flag catch to better their chances of winning. Teams that are losing tend to defend the flag by placing themselves between the Flag Runner and the opposing seeker.

== Positions ==
The players positions are shown by the colour of the headband they wear on pitch.

- Chasers (white headbands) are responsible for passing the quadball and scoring points by throwing the quadball through one of the opponent's goals for 10 points. Chasers may enter into physical contact with opposing chasers or keepers. There are three chasers on the field for each team.
- Keepers (green headband) function as chasers with extra privileges. The keeper is invulnerable to dodgeballs as well as having indisputable possession of the quadball when within their team's keeper zone, an area around the team's hoops. There is one keeper per team.
- Beaters (black headband) attempt to hit the opposing team's players with dodgeballs and attempt to block the dodgeballs from hitting their team's players. Beaters may catch a dodgeball to avoid being knocked out. As there are three dodgeballs for the four beaters on the pitch, the fourth, dodgeball-less beater puts pressure on the team in control of both dodgeballs (often called "dodgeball control" or "dodgeball supremacy"). If a beater is on a team that has no dodgeballs, they may raise a hand above their shoulder with their fist closed and claim "dodgeball immunity" to prevent being knocked out by live dodgeballs as they collect the third dodgeball. A team that has two dodgeballs may not prevent the other team from collecting the third dodgeball. Beaters may enter into physical contact only with other beaters.
- Seekers (yellow headband) attempt to catch the flag. They may not forcefully contact the flag runner but are permitted to contact the other seeker. The flag runner is released after 19 minutes, giving the seekers a chance to watch the flag runner before being released 1 minute later, after a total of 20 minutes of game time. There is one seeker on the field for each team.

== Equipment ==
The game is played with six standing hoops, three on each side of a square pitch. Each player must hold a broomstick between their legs. There are three different types of balls in play, and five in total: the quadball, three dodgeballs, and the flag.

=== Stick ===
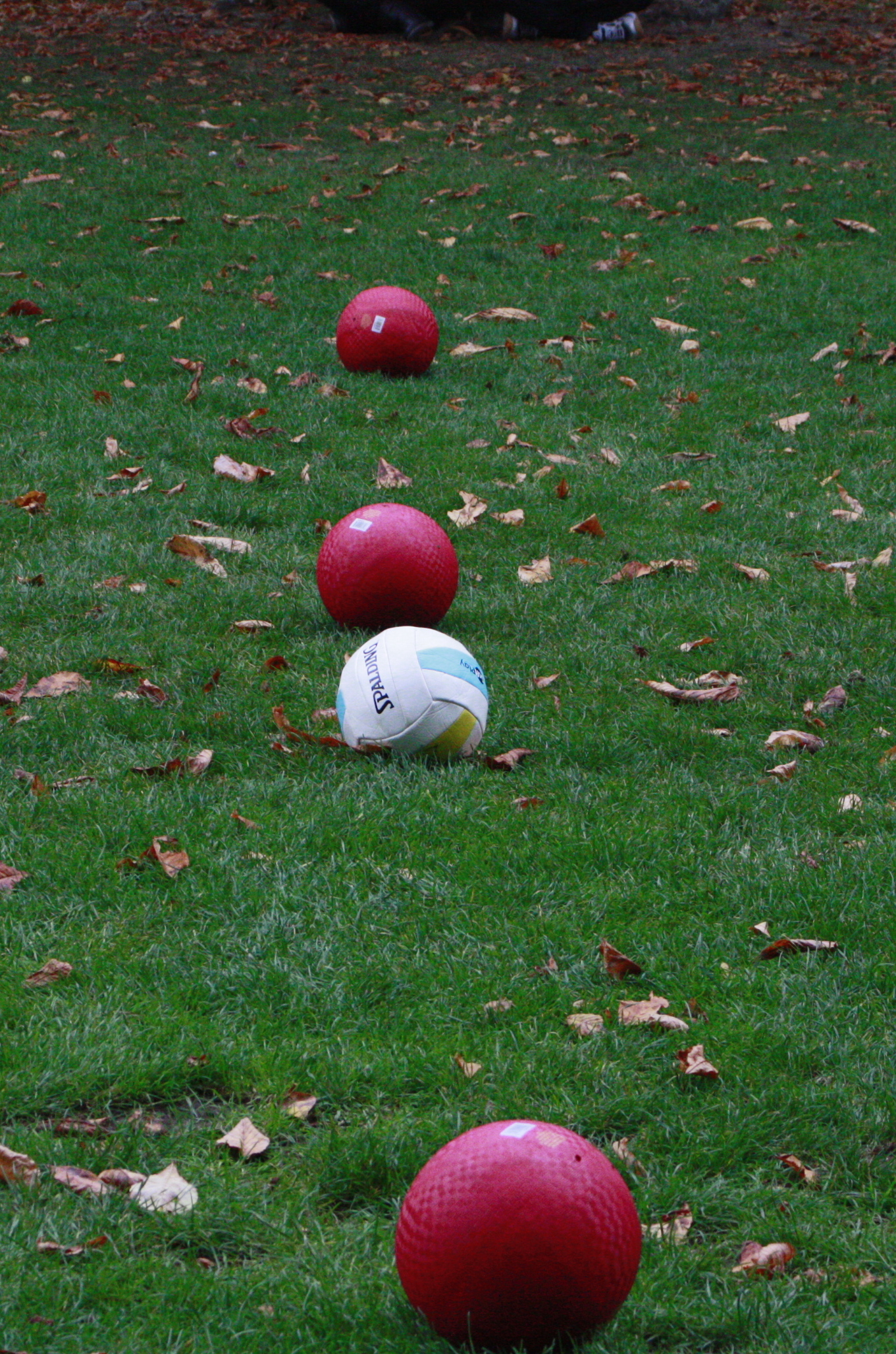
One quadball and three dodgeballs lined up for "sticks up" before a quadball match

The stick serves the purpose of being a handicap such as one-handed dribbling in basketball or using only one's feet in association football. The player must stay mounted on their stick continuously unless they have been hit with a dodgeball, in which case the player needs to dismount from their stick and return to their hoops. To be mounted on the broomstick means that the player must hold the stick between their legs and not have it fully on the ground. If a player comes off of their stick for any reason, they have to dismount fully and return to their hoops to tag back in and remount.

Players can substitute a variety of objects for stick depending on the level of seriousness. Many teams play on PVC pipes of about 3 feet or 1 meter in length; these are usually made, but can also be purchased from specialist quadball suppliers.

=== Hoops ===
Three hoops, each 2.75 ft or 84 cm across, are placed on either side of the pitch on poles of differing heights (3 ft or 0.91 m, 4.5 ft or 1.4 m and 6 ft or 1.8 m), placed 2.75 m or 9.0 ft apart. Chasers and keepers can score by throwing the quadball through any one of the hoops, from either front or back, gaining ten points for their team per score. Any player experiencing a knock-out effect from either dismounting their stick or getting hit with a dodgeball must touch with any part of their body excluding the stick to the pole or loop of any one of their hoops and then remount before returning to play.

=== Volleyball ===
The volleyball is slightly deflated and can only be manipulated by chasers or keepers. Used for scoring, it may pass through any hoop from either side. Regardless of which team caused the volleyball to pass through the hoop, as long as it is in play, a goal is scored against the team whose hoop was scored upon, which is counted to be 10 points.

=== Dodgeballs ===
The dodgeball is a slightly deflated standard dodgeball, 68 cm or 2.23 ft in circumference, that can only be manipulated by beaters. There are three dodgeballs. The dodgeballs are used to hit any other player on the field. Upon being hit by a dodgeball, a player must dismount their stick, drop any ball that they may have been carrying, and touch their team's hoops before resuming play. There also is no friendly fire, meaning that dodgeballs thrown by beaters cannot affect any of their teammates.

=== Flag ===
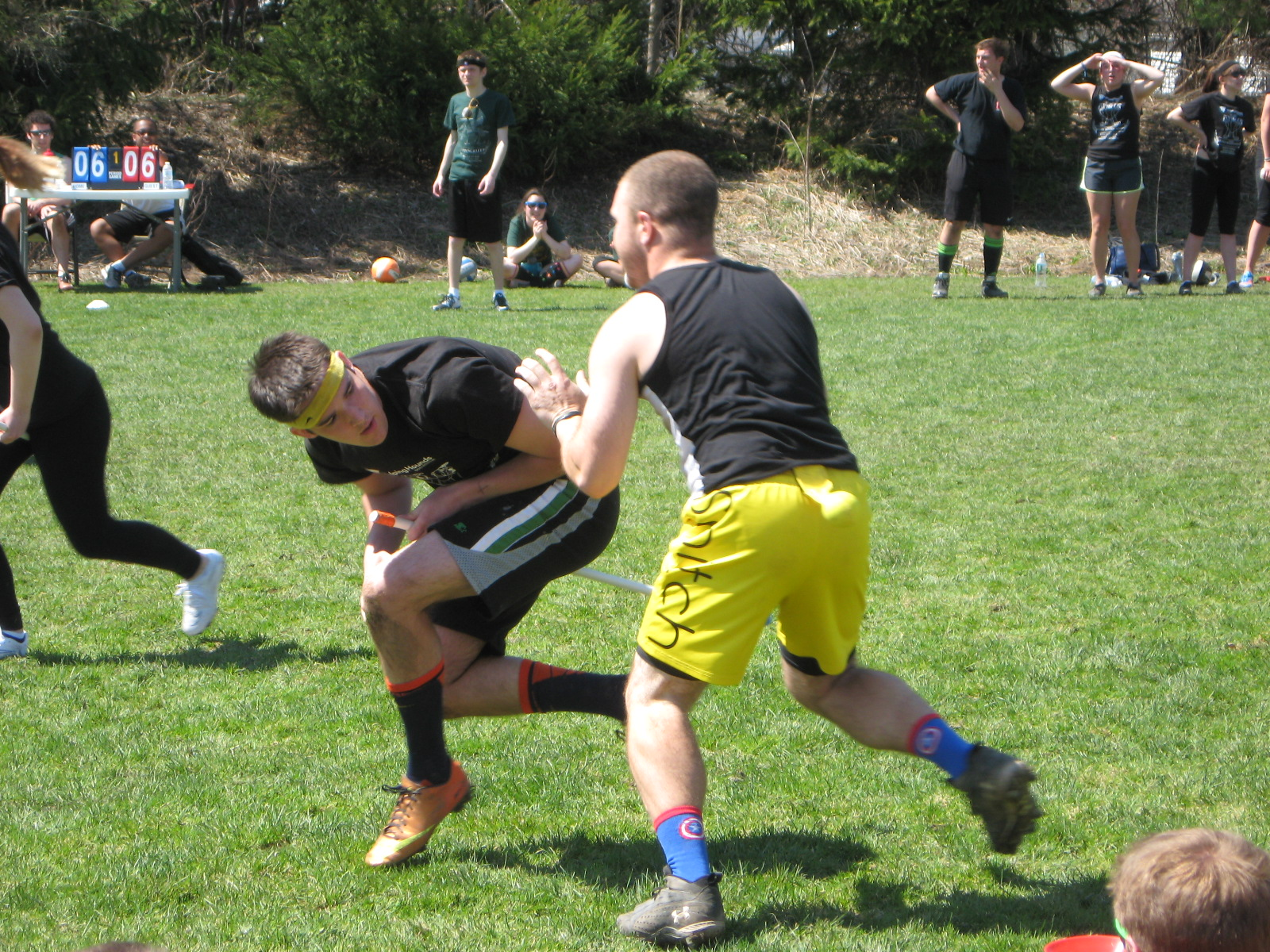
Seeker (l) and Flag Runner (r) at King's Cup Quidditch Tournament, Syracuse University, April 2015

The flag is a tennis ball placed at the bottom of a long yellow pouch that is attached to the back of the flag runner's shorts like in tag rugby. The flag-runner is allowed to be more physical than other players.

Only seekers may make advances towards the flag or the flag runner, and no forceful contact with the flag runner is allowed. If the flag is not caught within a certain period of time, handicaps for the flag runner come into play. Catching the flag awards 30 points.

As of the release of Rulebook 8, the flag runner is relegated to playing only on the field in the same fashion as the other players. Previously, flag runners left the pitch to be pursued by seekers returning to the field after a predetermined amount of time.

The flag runner has the following handicaps imposed on them as the game progresses, to even the field if they are significantly more skilled than either seeker

1. Upon the release of the seekers, the flag runner is required to remain between the keeper zone lines.
2. 25 minutes into the game, the flag runner is required to remain within roughly 1.5 meters of the midfield line.
3. 30 minutes into the game, the flag runner is required to use only one arm.
4. 35 minutes into the game, the flag runner is required to remain within roughly 1.5 meters of the intersection of the midfield and volleyball runner starting lines.

== Rules ==
USQ (originally IQA) has released 20 iterations of the Rulebook, each building upon the last. The modern IQA has released 10 iterations of the Rulebook since it split from USQ.

=== Playing ===
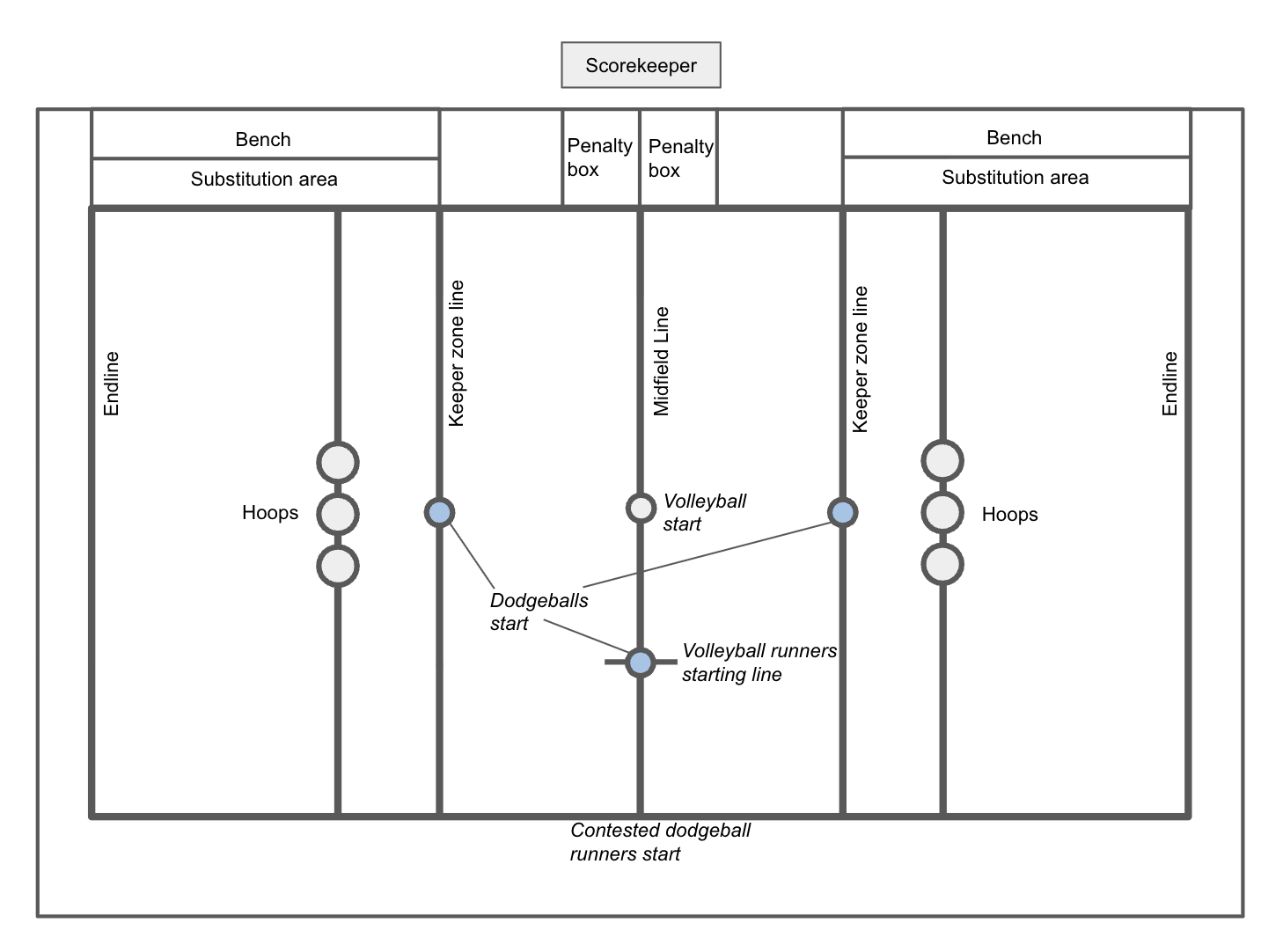

Each match begins with four of the starting players (excluding the seekers) along the starting line within their keeper zone with sticks on the ground. One beater from each team has a dodgeball with them. One chaser and one beater from each team line up at the midline, and the quadball and the contested dodgeball are placed 8.25 m or 9.02 yd in front of them.

The head referee then calls "sticks up!" at which players run to gain possession of the balls. After brooms up is called, the seekers must not interfere with other positions, and wait near the pitch until the end of the seeker floor, usually 20 minutes. The flag runner goes on the field at 19 minutes, and the seekers are released at 20 minutes.

Play runs rapidly, with quick change-of-hands of the quadball, because every goal (each worth 10 points) scored against a team gives that team the ball. Once a point is scored, the quadball must be given to the other team's keeper, and almost immediately returns to the offensive. Games can last any length of time longer than 20 minutes, depending on the skill and endurance of the seekers and flag runner. Because of this, there are flag runner handicaps to ensure games fit within reasonable time slots.

The game is won only after the flag has been caught cleanly, and the team that caught it is awarded 30 points. The winner is determined not by the flag catch but by the number of points earned at the time of catch; thus it is not unknown for teams that are losing by a wide margin to try delaying a flag catch so that they can narrow the opponents' lead, while teams that are up hope to catch rapidly.

=== Fouls and illegal plays ===
Depending on the severity of the foul, a player found committing an illegal play will result in a back-to-hoops, or a blue, yellow, and/or a red card. A back-to-hoops foul means the player must follow the same procedure as when hit with a dodgeball. A blue card or yellow card mean the player must go the penalty box, for either one minute or until the next goal. Blue cards do not stack, but two yellow cards stack to a red card. If a player receives a red card, they are banned from the rest of the match.

If a Keeper is sent to the penalty box, they must give their headband to another chaser on their team, as both teams are required to have a keeper on the pitch at all times.

Contact rules are similar to other contact sports. Tackles are legal between the knees and shoulders. Two-handed tackling is allowed. All tackles must be initiated from the front side of the opposing player. Any back tackles made will result in a yellow card, however, if the player turns their back into the tackle with no chance for adjustment, it is not considered illegal. Players can only tackle other players of their same position (with keepers considered chasers) if they have the ball. Pushes are allowed if the arm is held straight; it is illegal to push if the arm is bent and then extended when pushing another player. Players are not allowed to dive for balls, slide into contact, trip opposing players, or initiate contact around the neck or over the shoulder. If a player is found making any of these offences it will result in a card depending on the severity of the offence.

After several various types of illegal play, after an injury, or after a flag catch, the head referee will blow their whistle in paired short blasts to indicate stoppage of play, at which point which every player must drop their stick where they stand.

The flag runner can 'take a knee' by having any part of their body except their feet touch the floor. In this case, the seekers cannot advance towards them at all until three seconds after the flag runner is back up – if they do so, they will be sent back to hoops.

=== Pitch ===
The quadball pitch is usually marked with cones or with painted lines, and it is where all play occurs (a rectangle of 36 by 66 yards or 33 m × 60 m around the pitch). Balls are not allowed to be kicked off the pitch under penalty, nor is play allowed in the spectator zones. Players are asked to return to the pitch when play moves out of bounds.

On the edge of the pitch is a penalty box where players who have committed fouls that warrant yellow cards are sent for one minute.

=== Officials ===
Each official game requires having several referees present as well as an official flag runner. The referees consist of:

- Head referee, who enforces the rules, takes disciplinary action against players, and is the only official who may directly issue penalty cards;
- Assistant referees, who assist the Head Referee in calling whether players are subject to the knockout effect, watching plays away from the quadball and watching for balls and players going out of bounds;
- Flag referee, who watches plays around the snitch runner, including knockouts and potential catches, ruling whether the flag runner is down, and enforcing flag runner handicaps;
- Goal referees, who watch the shots taken towards the goals and ruling whether the quadball is out of bounds at their endline.

The flag runner, being a neutral player and assistant referee, may help the referees to determine whether or not the catch was clean.

There is also usually a timekeeper and scorekeeper for each game.

== Rules history ==
The rules of quadball have changed as the sport has developed over time. New IQA rulebooks are released approximately every one or two years.

=== 2022 rulebook changes ===
Along with the name change and removal of all copyrighted terms, the 2022 IQA rulebook added in two-arm wrappings and tackling, allow initiating contact from behind if a player has come to a complete stop and extend the seeker floor from 17 to 20 minutes (bringing it in line with the current USQ/MLQ seeker floor). It also adds other minor rules such as required extra breaks during high heat or humidity, allowing plastic shin guards and metal cleats, penalizing beats thrown to the head from less than 5 meters away and new rules about specific scenarios with regard to resetting and stalled quaffles.

One additional change was proposed but failed receive enough votes which was a "3 maximum" gender rule that would allow teams to only have up to a maximum of 3 players of the same gender on pitch before the seeker floor (compared to the current 4 maximum of the same gender on pitch at any time). QuadballUK have decided to implement this rule change starting in 2023.

=== 2024 rulebook changes ===
The 2024 IQA rulebook incorporated the '3-max' rule proposed in 2022, with exemptions for teams deemed to be 'developing'. Other rule changes included tweaks to tackling and head-beat rules, intended to improve safety, and an increase in the distance between the hoops.

== International Quadball Association ==
World Map of quadball activity as of 2022. Dark blue indicates full member, light blue indicates associate member.

The International Quadball Association serves as the central governing body for quadball worldwide and helps to coordinate with national associations around the world through the IQA Congress. Previously, The IQA held a World Cup for qualifying members of the association at the end of every season, the first being held in 2007, ending in 2014 with its restructuring. Now, the IQA hosts World Cups featuring national teams, as well as Continental Games in the years between World Cups.

Each nation in which quadball is played has or is in the process of developing has a national organisation. The job of the national organisation, or NGB, is to organise quadball within the country, create membership policies for teams, organize referees, snitches, and coaches and be the bridge between that nation's teams and the IQA.

== Competitions ==
=== International tournaments ===
==== IQA World Cup ====
Previously known as the Global Games and Summer Games, the World Cup is the IQA's tournament for national teams. It takes place every two years and any quadball-playing nation is offered the chance at competing on the world level at this tournament. The last tournament took place in Brussels, Belgium, in July 2025.

The original World Cup was titled "Summer Games" to match the Olympics being held in London, United Kingdom. July 2012 saw five national teams from around the world compete in this first international tournament run by the IQA, taking place in University Parks, Oxford, England. The five teams were from the US, Canada, France, UK, and Australia.

IQA World Cups
Year	Host city	Champion	Second	Third
2012 Details	(United Kingdom) Oxford	United States	France	Australia
2014 Details	(Canada) Burnaby (Note: The 2014 Global Games were held in Canada but officially hosted by US Quidditch.)	United States	Australia	Canada
2016 Details	(Germany) Frankfurt	Australia	United States	United Kingdom
2018 Details	(Italy) Florence	United States	Belgium	Turkey
2023 Details	(United States) Richmond	United States	Germany	Belgium
2025 Details	(Belgium) Brussels	Belgium	Germany	Australia

==== European Games ====
Similar to the World Cup, the European Games is an international tournament open to national teams. Inclusion within the European Games is limited to members of the European Committee (also known as Quadball Europe or QEurope). The first European Games were held in Sarteano, Italy in July 2015.

==== European Quadball Cup ====
The European Quadball Cup, also known as EQC and formerly known as the European Quidditch Championship, is a yearly championship tournament for teams in Europe. EQC began first in France in Lesparre-Médoc on 13 October 2012 where a minimal number of teams attended due to the fact that quidditch was only recently introduced to Europe. The tournament quickly grew however and during the 2015–2016 season, Gallipoli, Italy, hosted EQC IV on 16–17 April 2016, with 40 teams attending from 13 countries. Mechelen Belgium hosted EQC V on 25–26 March 2017, and saw 32 attending teams from 15 countries.

==== Asian Quadball Cup ====
The inaugural Asian Quadball Cup took place between the 30 and 31 July 2016 in Malaysia. It was held again in 2017 and held biennially to match the World Cup/Regional tournament alternations. The teams that competed at the inaugural Asian Quadball Cup were the Australian National University Owls (ANU), Damansara Dementors, and Subang Chimaeras. The ANU Owls emerged champions.

=== Regional or league tournaments ===
==== Canadian Nationals ====
Canadian Nationals is the national championship tournament for Quadball Canada. The 2014–2015 national championship was held in Burnaby, British Columbia on 28 March 2015. Its precursors, East and West Regionals, were held in Kingston, Ontario and Moose Jaw, Saskatchewan on 1 and 7 February 2015, respectively.

==== Major League Quadball ====
Major League Quadball (MLQ) was founded in 2015. MLQ features standardized schedules, officiation, statistics, and live or previously recorded footage of all games. The league included eight teams across the United States and Canada for its inaugural season in the summer of 2015. The league expanded to 16 teams for the 2016 season with the slogan "#16for16". For its third season in 2017, the league introduced practice squads behind the 16 teams, as well as developed a policy to allow league official teams to play unaffiliated teams.

==== QUAFL ====
Yearly, the Australian Quadball Association hosts QUAFL (Quadball united Australian federated league), an all-Australian championship that determines which Australian team is the best. The first tournament was held in December 2011 at UNSW, Sydney and won by the hosts. The second tournament was hosted by Macquarie University and was won again by the UNSW Snapes on a plane. The tournament in 2013 was held at the University of Western Sydney on 30 November and 1 December. The winning team was the Perth Phoenixes. Melbourne Manticores defeated UNSW Snapes On A Plane in the 2014 tournament final held at Macquarie University. The same teams would make the 2015 tournament final, held at Monash University, where the Manticores would once again emerge triumphant. Wrackspurts QC from Victoria took out the 2016 tournament held at the Australian Institute of Sport. Most recently in the 2017 tournament held at the same location as 2016, the Whomping Willows of Victoria (in their first year as a team) took out the QUAFL cup.

==== Quidditch Premier League ====
Beginning in 2017, the Quidditch Premier League (QPL) was a league in the United Kingdom that, as of its end in 2019, was split into four divisions and 17 teams.

==== USQ Championships (US Quadball Cup) ====
The US Quadball Cup (previously known as the IQA World Cup, Quidditch World Cup, and US Quidditch Cup) is the national championship tournament for US Quadball. The tournament is a continuation of the IQA's original "Quidditch World Cup", having changed names for the 2015–2016 season and US Quidditch Cup 9. The change came about as the IQA shifted to become solely an international governing body for the sport and USQ took over quidditch governance in the United States. Each year, teams from around the United States compete at their respective regional championships to qualify for the US Quadball Cup tournament held at the end of the college school year. In the 2017–2018 season, USQ introduced separate divisions for college and community/club teams.

The goal of the USQ Championships is to compete to see which team is the best in the United States. USQ membership policy dictated that any team outside the US would be eligible to compete in this and any other USQ tournament as long as they pay the membership fees in full, but, to date, only two teams outside the US have registered as such: University of British Columbia's A and B teams. This policy, however, has since been discontinued. The first US Quadball Cup champion, since the forming of a separate USQ nationals, was Quidditch Club Boston (QCB) in 2016.

The regions within USQ are:

- Northeast
- Great Lakes
- Midwest
- Mid-Atlantic
- West
- South
- Southwest
- Northwest

US Quadball Cup Winners (Previously the Quidditch World Cup)
Year	Winner	Title (at the time)	Organizing Body	Location
2008	Middlebury College	World Cup 1	IQA	Middlebury, VT
2009	Middlebury College	World Cup 2	IQA	Middlebury, VT
2010	Middlebury College	World Cup 3	IQA	Middlebury, VT
2011	Middlebury College	World Cup 4	IQA	New York, NY
2012	Middlebury College	World Cup 5	IQA	New York, NY
2013	University of Texas	World Cup 6	IQA	Kissimmee, FL
2014	University of Texas	World Cup 7	IQA	North Myrtle Beach, SC
2015	University of Texas	World Cup 8	USQ	Rock Hill, SC
2016	Quidditch Club Boston (QCB)	US Quidditch Cup 9	USQ	Columbia, SC
2017	Texas Cavalry	US Quidditch Cup 10	USQ	Kissimmee, FL
2018	University of Rochester (College Division) Texas Cavalry (Club Division)	US Quidditch Cup 11	USQ	Round Rock, TX
2019	University of Texas (College Division) Texas Cavalry (Club Division)	US Quidditch Cup 12	USQ	Round Rock, TX
2022	University of Texas (College Division) Texas Hill Country Heat (Club Division)	US Quidditch Cup 2022	USQ	Salt Lake City, UT
2023	University of Texas at San Antonio (College Division) The Warriors (Club Division)	US Quadball Cup 2023	USQ	Conshohocken, PA
2024	Harvard Horntails (College Division) Boom Train (Club Division)	US Quadball Cup 2024	USQ	Round Rock, TX
2025	Creighton Quadball Club (College Division) The Warriors (Club Division)	US Quadball Cup 2025	USQ	Richmond, VA

===== IQA World Cup (old) =====
The IQA World Cup is the former "world" championship of quidditch, which was held yearly in the United States. As it was maintained by the former IQA, it was almost a purely US-based tournament, seeing little turnout from teams outside of the country. This tournament was discontinued in 2014 when the IQA took on its new role as an international sports federation, choosing instead to host the then-Global Games now-World Cup as a world championship with individual teams relying on their national governing body for a culminating tournament.

==== British Tournaments ====
The British Quadball Cup was first held in Oxford, England, on 9 and 10 November 2013, and was won by the Oxford University's first team, The Radcliffe Chimeras. The BQC was repeated on the weekend of 7 March 2015 held in Wollaton Park, Nottingham. At this tournament, the defending Champions, The Radcliffe Chimeras, were defeated in the final by Southampton Quidditch Club 1, with Keele Squirrels coming third. In total 24 teams were registered to compete with 23 doing so.

Also significant in the UK are the two regional tournaments – Northern Cup and Southern Cup. Originally devised as independently organised tournaments by Keele University Quidditch Club in March 2014, and the Southampton Quidditch Club the following November, the inaugural tournaments were won by Bangor Broken Broomsticks and Radcliffe Chimeras. The tournaments were then taken over by QuadballUK, to ensure consistency between the two, as the tournaments are now used as qualification criteria for the European Quidditch Cup. The second Northern Cup took place on the 31 October–1 November 2015, and was won by Nottingham Nightmares, who defeated Durhamstrang in the final. The second Southern Cup took place on the 14–15 November and was won by the Radcliffe Chimeras, who defeated Warwick Quidditch Club in the final. The following year, the Velociraptors won Northern and Warwick Quidditch Club Southern. The top three teams from each regional tournament (from Northern: the Velociraptors, Durhamstrang, and Tornadoes Quidditch Club and from Southern: Warwick Quidditch Club, Werewolves of London, and Brizzlebears) qualified for the European Quidditch Cup, which took place on the 25–26 March 2017.

In 2017, the increasing number of teams led to the introduction of the Development Cup, or Dev Cup for short, where teams that did not qualify for BQC could play. The style is a round-robin tournament, leading to all teams playing eight games (in the first one) over two days. The first winners of this were the Liverpuddly Cannons, who won all of their games.

Other long-standing tournaments include the Annual Mercian Cup, a mercenary tournament hosted by Derby Union Quidditch, Highlander Cup hosted by the Edinburgh Holyrood Hippogriffs, Reading University's Whiteknights Tournament, and Oxford's unique Valentines Cup, a fantasy tournament where players signed up in pairs. Since awareness of quidditch in the UK is rising exponentially, every year new tournaments are being devised.

In February 2017 it was announced that a Quidditch Premier League would be established in 2017.

== Gender or "three maximum" rule and the LGBT community ==
Since its inception, quadball has sought gender equality on the pitch. One of the most important requirements within the sport is its gender maximum rule, which states:

A team may not have more than three players who identify as the same gender in play at the same time during either the seeker floor or overtime and not more than four players who identify as the same gender otherwise.

The gender that a player identifies as is considered to be that player’s gender

— "Gender maximum rule"

This is a change from pre-2024 when the rule was 4 players of one gender on the pitch at one time, and allows exemptions back to the 4-max rule to be given to developing teams

In 2013, US Quidditch created Title 9¾, a nod to the facetious name once used to refer to the rule, a branch of the IQA that actively promotes advocacy and awareness as well as gender equality and inclusivity, whose role moved on to the IQA under its "Initiatives". The sport has also been illustrated to yield a positive experience for athletes of all genders, increased desires for inclusivity and stereotype reduction.

== See also ==
- International Quadball Association
- IQA World Cup
- Major League Quadball
