= IQA World Cup VII =

2014 Quidditch tournament

- 2014

Tournament information
- Sport: Quidditch
- Location: North Myrtle Beach
- Dates: 5–6 April 2014
- Administrator: International Quidditch Association
- Tournament format(s): Pool play Single elimination bracket
- Venue: North Myrtle Beach Sports Complex
- Teams: 79

Final positions
- Champion: University of Texas at Austin
- Runner-up: Texas State University

Tournament statistics
- Matches played: 203

The IQA World Cup VII was the 2014 edition of the IQA World Cup (now the US Quidditch Cup), a quidditch club tournament then organized by the International Quidditch Association. The tournament was held in North Myrtle Beach, South Carolina from April 5–6, 2014.

The Cup featured 73 teams from the United States, five from Canada and one from Australia, that qualified through eight regional championships. The final, which saw two Texan teams competing against each other, resulted in a 130*–70 victory for the University of Texas at Austin against Texas State University.

== Format ==
80 teams qualified for the cup and were divided into 16 pools of five team each. However, due to a late withdrawal from the Rutgers Nearly Headless Knights less than a week from the tournament, pool 14 ended up with only four teams and the tournament was finally contested by 79 teams. Each team played against all other teams in their pool, and the three best teams of each pool advanced to the 48-team single-elimination bracket phase. The winner of each pool received a bye in the first round, entering the bracket at the round of 32.

== Results ==
=== Bracket phase ===
Three out of four teams in the semi-finals hailed from Texas. University of Texas at Austin beat Texas A&M Quidditch 110*–50, while Texas State University defeated Emerson College Quidditch 140*–80. The University of Texas claimed its second championship with a 130*–70 victory against Texas State University.

First round
Austin	80*
Minnesota	60
Michigan State Spartans	110*
Grand Valley Grindylows	10
McGill	60
UNC Chapel Hill	160*
Gee-Gees	120*
Appalachian	80
Penn State Nittany Lions	100*
Santa Barbara Blacktips	70
Kansas	160*
New York Nundu	60
UCLA	100
Rochester Thestrals	50*
Ball State Cardinals	100
Northern Arizona Narwhals	90*
Stanford	50
Louisiana State	90*
Florida	110^
Long Beach Funky Quaffles	70*
Ohio State	120*
Richmond Spiders	40
Tennessee Tech	120*
Arizona State Sun Devil	80
Carleton	100*
Oklahoma State	90
Central Michigan	110*
Virginia	10
RIT Dark Marks	80*^
Q.C. Boston	60
Crimson Fliers	50
Miami	90*

Round of 32
U Texas	140
Austin	70*
Maryland	90*
Michigan State Spartans	50
Bowling Green	110*
UNC Chapel Hill	70
Baylor	150*
Gee-Gees	20
Lone Star Q.C.	180*
Penn State Nittany Lions	100
Tufts Tufflepuffs	60
Kansas	70*
Arkansas Razorback	100*
UCLA	70
Texas A&M	110*
Ball State Cardinals	10
Lost Boys	90
Louisiana State	100*
Texas State	110*
Florida	60
Villanova	50
Ohio State	100*
Michigan	180*
Tennessee Tech	120
Boston U	90*
Carleton	20
Silicon Valley Skrewts	70*
Central Michigan	40
Florida's Finest	90*
RIT Dark Marks	40
Emerson College	80*
Miami	70

Round of 16
U Texas	90*
Maryland	50
Bowling Green	40
Baylor	120*
Lone Star Q.C.	110
Kansas	60*
Arkansas Razorbacks	10
Texas A&M	60*
Louisiana State	40
Texas State	100*
Ohio State	90*
Michigan	60
Boston U	100*
Silicon Valley Skrewts	40
Florida's Finest	90
Emerson College	150*

Quarter-finals
U Texas	110*
Baylor	40
Lone Star Q.C.	70
Texas A&M	100*
Texas State	100*
Ohio State	60
Boston U	60
Emerson College	90*

Semi-finals
U Texas	110*
Texas A&M	50
Texas State	140*
Emerson College	80

Final
U Texas	130*
Texas State	70
