= Quadball Canada =

Governing body of the sport quidditch in Canada

- Abbreviation: QC, QuidCan
- Formation: 2014
- Type: National sport organization (NSO)
- Legal status: Non-Profit Organization
- Headquarters: Ottawa
- Location: Canada
- Main organ: International Quadball Association
- Website: Official Quadball Canada website

Quadball Canada (formerly known as Quidditch Canada) is the governing body that oversees quadball (formerly quidditch) within Canada under its mother organization, the International Quadball Association. In August 2022, QC announced plans to rebrand with the new name Quadball in 2023.

== History ==
Quadball Canada was founded July 1, 2014, to administer and organize the sport of quadball in Canada after the relaunch of the original International Quadball Association as US Quidditch. The organization is a Registered Canadian Amateur Athletic Association and has grown to include over 20 teams across the country.

== Structure ==
Quadball Canada is the National Governing Body for quadball in Canada. There are director-led departments for Membership, Gameplay, Communications, Events, and Volunteers. The structure is expected to change slightly in the near future, potentially moving to a policy board governance model, in order to comply with regulatory requirements for recognition by Sport Canada and to enable better communication with members and engagement with volunteers.

== Competitions ==
With the advent of Quadball Canada, there has been an increase in the number of teams across the country, enabling more play between Canadian teams. Teams from the US and Canada occasionally cross the border for tournaments in order to increase the diversity of competition. Canada is split into two regions, Eastern Canada and Western Canada, at the Ontario/Manitoba border. These regions feature annual regional championships and other tournaments, both official and fantasy, throughout the year. The highest level of competition is the annual Quadball Canada national championship. The biggest annual Canadian fantasy tournament is the Canada Day Fantasy Tournament (CDFT), an open fantasy tournament held the weekend before Canada Day in Ottawa, Ontario.

Location of Major Events
Year	Eastern Regionals	Western Regionals	Nationals
2014-2015	Kingston, ON	Moose Jaw, SK	Burnaby, BC
2015-2016	Montreal, QC	Abbotsford, BC	Kingston, ON
2016-2017	Mississauga, ON	Surrey, BC	Victoria, BC
2017-2018	Oshawa, ON	Abbotsford, BC	Hamilton, ON
2018-2019	Oshawa, ON	Victoria, BC	Hamilton, ON
2019-2020	Guelph, ON	Surrey, BC	Edmonton, AB
2021-2022	Oshawa, ON	N/A	Edmonton, AB

=== National championship ===
The first national championship was held in Burnaby, B.C. at Swanguard Stadium on March 28–29, 2015. This event attracted eight teams from across Canada, and included an exhibition game between McGill Quidditch and US Quidditch member team UBC Quidditch. The championship was won by the Avengers who beat McGill Quidditch 40*-30 in cold, wet, and muddy conditions.

Prior to 2015, the Eastern Canada Regional Championship, known at the time as the Canadian Cup, had often been considered the unofficial national championship for Canadian quadball.

The 2016-2017 QC Nationals were held on April 1–2, 2017 at University of Victoria. This was Quadball Canada's third national championship. Victoria is the home of Western Canada's original quadball team, the UVic Valkyries. The championship was won by the Edmontors Aurors Quidditch Club who defeated the University of Guelph Gryphons, with Valhalla finishing third after defeating University of British Columbia ThunderBirds.

For both the 2017-2018 and 2018–2019 seasons the Nationals Championship was held in Hamilton, Ontario at two different venues. For the 2017–2018 season the host was Tim Horton's Field home of the Hamilton Tiger-Cats. Followed by the 2018–2019 season in which McMaster University was the host. This was the first instance of the National championship remaining in not only the same region for 2 consecutive years but also the first instance of a repeat host city despite the change in venue.

Team	(Ontario) Kingston [2016] (15)	(Victoria, British Columbia) [2017] (8)	(Hamilton, Ontario) [2018] (17)	(Hamilton, Ontario) [2019] (15)
Calgary Lightning	9	5	2	.
Canada's Finest Quidditch Club	11	.	17	14
Carleton Ravens	7	.	11	.
Edmonton Aurors	9	1	7	6
McGill Quidditch	2	.	15	13
Ottawa Otters	.	.	.	1
Queen's Quidditch Club	5	.	5	7
Royal City Quidditch	12	.	11	9
Ryerson Quidditch	14	.	.	.
SFU Quidditch	.	7	.	15
Club de Quidditch de l'Université de Montréal	3	.	4	.
University of British Columbia	.	4	8	.
University of British Columbia Quidditch Club	.	8	14	.
University of Guelph Gryphons	7	2	3	2
UTSC Phoenix	13	.	.	.
UTSG Centaurs	11	.	6	11
uVic Valkyries Quidditch Club	.	6	.	.
uOttawa Quidditch	1	.	10	10
Valfreyja Quidditch Club	.	.	13	5
Valhalla Quidditch	5	3	1	4
Vancouver Storm Crows Quidditch Club	.	.	.	3
Waterloo Ridgebacks	4	.	9	8

Legend

- 1st – Champions
- 2nd – Runners-up
- 3rd – Third place
- 4th – Fourth place
- • – Did not enter / Did not qualify

=== Regional tournaments ===
==== Eastern Canada ====
The 2014-2015 Eastern Canadian Regional Championship was held at 1000 Islands Sportsplex in Kingston, Ontario. It featured 16 teams from Ontario and Quebec playing against each other for rankings. The final game was McGill Quidditch over Carleton Quidditch with a score of 190-90*. McGill went on to attend the National Championship where they finished second.

The last event known as the Canadian Cup was on November 9, 2013, at Cherry Beach Fields in Toronto, Ontario. It involved only teams from Eastern Canada as Western Canadian teams were invited to attend the Western Regional Championship along with teams from the western United States. The results from the tournament were:

- 1: uOttawa - GeeGees
- 2: Carleton University
- 3: McGill University
- 4: uOttawa - Maple Rush

After Europe's bids were allocated followed European teams' inability to attend the World Cup, Valhalla claimed Canada's additional bid after defeating Guelph University.

Previous Canadian Cups were held on November 11, 2012, at Queen's University and October 29, 2011, at Carleton University. McGill University Quidditch was the regional champion for the 2012-2013 and 2011–2012 seasons. The 2011 Canadian Cup was also Canada's first quidditch tournament and featured eight teams, including one, St Lawrence University, from the United States.

==== Western Canada ====
The inaugural Western Canadian Regional Championship was held at the Yara Centre in Moose Jaw, Saskatchewan on February 1, 2015. This location was chosen due to facility availability and in an attempt to distribute travel costs more evenly between the teams, since the National Championship would be held in the lower mainland of BC. Only two teams were able to attend, the Winnipeg Whomping Willows and the Alberta Clippers. The Alberta Clippers won all three games with scores of 210-30*, 150-30*, and 260*-20. Both teams traveled to the National Championship joining the other western Canadian teams, SFU Quidditch, Vancouver Vipertooths, and University of Victoria Valkyries there.

Prior to the creation of Quidditch Canada, the region of Western Canada was grouped with the western United States for competitive purposes. The 2013-2014 Western US Championship was held in Tempe, AZ. Western Canadian teams decided against travelling the distance and so did not participate in the 2013/2014 Western Regional Championship.

In the 2012/2013 season, the University of British Columbia's Thunderbirds, then Western Canada's only team, competed at the Western Regional Championships in Placer Valley, California. The team was eliminated on the first day, and so did not advance to bracket play.

In the 2011–2012 season, there were no regional championship requirements to attend the IQA World Cup. As such, the University of Victoria represented western Canada at IQA World Cup V in New York City.

=== Fantasy tournaments ===
==== Canada Day Fantasy ====
Canada Day Fantasy Tournament (CDFT) is held yearly on the Sunday of the weekend before Canada Day in Ottawa, Ontario. It used by to be organized and hosted by a mix of players and volunteers from the Ottawa quadball community. It is now organized by Quadball Canada with the assistance of local volunteers. Fantasy tournaments feature teams constructed specifically for the tournament and composed of players from a multitude of regular-season teams. General Managers for the tournament select players for their team from a list of eligible participants. The latest CDFT was held on June 28, 2015. Due to weather and field conditions, some games were cut out of the event. The final was won by Jamie Lafrance's Baby Blue team.

The first CDFT happened on June 30, 2013, at Immaculata High School and featured six teams and over 100 athletes from across Canada and the United States. The Blue Team/Team Broduce, led by General Manager Jamie Lafrance of uOttawa Quidditch, won CDFT 2013 with a victory over the Black Team/Hipster Horcruxes.

=== Other tournaments ===
Sudbury Quidditch Open Invitational: took place on September 19, 2015, at the Art Gallery of Sudbury in Sudbury, Ontario.

Perdue's Cup: An annual tournament open to all Quidditch Canada teams being held at the Festival of Wizardry, in Blyth, Ontario.

Alberta Games: The first annual Alberta Games took place at the Edgemont Community Centre in Calgary on November 30, 2013. Three teams competed: University of Calgary, University of Alberta, and Central Alberta Quidditch.

== Teams ==
Canada's first quadball teams were in Ontario and Québec, with McGill University being the oldest, but there has been a rapid expansion of teams across the country, notably within Ontario, Québec, B.C., and Alberta. Member teams as recognized by Quadball Canada for the 2018–2019 season were:

British Columbia

- Simon Fraser University
- University of Victoria Valkyries
- UBC Thunderbirds Quidditch Sport Club
- Vancouver Stormcrows Quidditch Club
- Vancouver Vipertooths

Alberta

- Edmonton Aurors Quidditch Club
- Calgary Lightning
- Central Alberta Quidditch

Québec

- McGill University - McGill
- McGill University - Canada's Finest Quidditch Club
- Montreal Flamingos

Ontario

- University of Ottawa - GeeGees
- Carleton University
- University of Waterloo
- University of Guelph
- Royal City Quidditch
- Mississauga Manatees Quidditch Club
- University of Toronto (Mississauga Campus)
- Valhalla (Toronto)
- University of Toronto (St. George Campus)
- Queen's University

Former teams or not registered for the Quidditch Canada 2019–2020 season

- Ottawa Otters
- Valfreyja Quidditch Club
- Club de Quidditch de l'Université de Montréal
- Maple rush
- Fleming

- York University
- X University
- University of Toronto Scarborough Campus Phoenix (UTSC Phoenix)
- McMaster Marauders Quidditch Club
- Algonquin College

Unregistered teams, rumoured teams, or teams registered elsewhere include:

British Columbia

- Nanaimo Nightwings Quidditch
- Vancouver Island Vanishing Cabinets

Alberta

- Drayton Valley Dreadnoughts
- Grande Prairie Comp Cauldrons
- U of A Augustana Campus Quidditch Club

Nova Scotia

- Dalhousie Tigers Quidditch

Saskatchewan

- Saskatoon Quidditch
- Regina Quidditch

Manitoba

- Winnipeg Whomping Willows

Newfoundland and Labrador

- St. John's Area Quidditch Scrimmage League

== National team ==
There has been a Canadian national roster set for three international events, the latest being assembled for IQA Quidditch World Cup 2016, which was held in Frankfurt, Germany on July 23–24, 2016. This marked the first time that team selection and coordination were conducted through Quidditch Canada as the National Sport Organization.

The 2014 Canadian national team competed on July 19, 2014, at the Burnaby Lake sports complex in Burnaby, British Columbia against six other national teams: Belgium, France, Mexico, Australia, the UK, and the USA. The Global Games was a biennial event run by the International Quidditch Association that features national teams from quidditch-playing nations instead of collegiate or community teams. Canada took third place in the 2014 IQA Global Games following the United States and Australia, respectively.[1]

The first Team Canada was formed in 2012 to compete at the Summer Games in Oxford, UK where the team placed 4th of 5 teams in the first tournament to feature national squads. Quidditch Canada hosted a second national team at the 2014 Global Games in Burnaby, BC on July 19. The 2014 national team was chosen after a rigorous series of tryouts.

== Coaching conferences ==
The University of Ottawa held a quidditch coaching conference - the first of its kind - on October 5–6, 2013. Approximately 30 people, primarily coaches and captains from 15 different Canadian teams, gathered for a series of workshops to discuss and learn about coaching techniques and tactics.

A coaching clinic was hosted in Edmonton on June 26, 2016. About 10 people participated from across Alberta to learn about coaching techniques, problem solving skills, and safety.

== Relation with other sport bodies ==
The restructuring of the IQA greatly impacted quadball in Canada. In particular, while Quadball Canada and US Quidditch have worked together to allow member teams of both organizations to play limited ranked games against each other, that structure still limited the overall quantity of games between members of each organization.

== Kidditch ==
Kidditch is a modified version of quadball made for children where there is limited contact and minor changes in the rules. Various teams across Canada have outreach programmes at local primary and secondary school where kidditch is played as an after-school programme.

== See also ==
- Quidditch (sport)
- International Quidditch Association
- Sport in Canada
