= 2017 Asian Quidditch Cup =

Asian Quidditch Cup
- 2017

Tournament information
- Sport: Quidditch
- Location: Hanoi, Vietnam
- Dates: 23–23 July 2017
- Tournament format(s): Single round-robin
- Host(s): Vietnam Quidditch Association
- Teams: 5

Final positions
- Champion: (Australia) ANU Owls
- 1st runner-up: (South Korea) Seoul Puffskeins
- 2nd runner-up: (Malaysia) Damansara Dementors

Tournament statistics
- Matches played: 10

The 2017 Asian Quidditch Cup is the second edition of the Asian Quidditch Cup (AQC). It was held in Hanoi, Vietnam on 23 July 2017. Five teams from Australia, Malaysia, South Korea and Vietnam competed in the tournament.

== Bidding ==
The host is determined by bidding for the first time. Two bids by Hanoi and Seoul were submitted in March 2017. The host was determined by interim members of the Oceania-Asia Quidditch Committee with representatives from Australia, New Zealand, Malaysia, Indonesia, Hong Kong, South Korea, Taiwan, and Vietnam.

== Participating teams ==
Asia
Australia
Participating teams

Team	Previous appearances in tournament
(Australia) ANU Owls	1
(Malaysia) Damansara Dementors	1
(Vietnam) Flame Owls	0
(Vietnam) Hanoi Draco Dormiens	0
(South Korea) Seoul Puffskeins	0

== Structure ==
Originally, there would be a knock-out stage after the group (single round-robin) stage, where the 1st ranked team would play the 2nd ranked team in the Championship match and the 3rd ranked team would play the 4th ranked team in the third place match.

Eventually, the knock-out matches were not played due to insufficient time. Instead, the rankings after the single round-robin matches became final.

== Results ==
The ANU Owls won the 2017 Cup, keeping their status as undefeated champions.

Pos	Team	W	L	QPD	SWIM	Flame Owls	Hanoi Draco Dormiens	Damansara Dementors	Seoul Puffskeins
1	(Australia) ANU Owls	4	0	140	2	120* – 50	90* – 70	140* – 50	60* – 40
2	(South Korea) Seoul Puffskeins	2	2	50	1	140* – 40	80 – 140*	60* – 30	
3	(Malaysia) Damansara Dementors	2	2	50	0	110* – 30	160* – 130		
4	(Vietnam) Hanoi Draco Dormiens	2	2	20	1	110* – 40			
5	(Vietnam) Flame Owls	0	4	−260	0				
