= US Quadball =

- Abbreviation: USQ
- Formation: 2010
- Legal status: Non-profit organization
- Location: United States
- CEO: Amanda Dallas
- Board of directors: Annika Kim (chair); Justin Bogart (vice chair); Clay Dockery (treasurer); Patrick Rardin (secretary); Alexia Barnes; Taylor Crawford; Lynne Collenback; Andrew Acosta (junior board member); Ryan Callaghan (junior board member); Lilly Parrott (junior board member)
- Website: www.usquadball.org

US Quadball (USQ), formerly known as US Quidditch, is a non-profit organization that serves as the national governing body for the sport of quadball in the United States. It was incorporated as a 501(c)(3) organization in March 2010 as the International Quidditch Association, five years after the sport was created by students at Middlebury College. It became US Quidditch in 2014, when a separate body was formed under the name International Quadball Association, and adopted the name US Quadball in July 2022.

USQ organizes regional and national competition, including its national championship, the US Quadball Cup, and publishes a rulebook that many other national leagues have adopted or adapted.

== History ==
=== Origins at Middlebury (2005–2009) ===
The sport now known as quadball was created in 2005 by Xander Manshel and Alex Benepe, freshmen and dorm roommates at Middlebury College in Middlebury, Vermont. The rules were originally derived from the fictional sport of Quidditch, from the fantasy novel and movie series Harry Potter. Manshel proposed playing a real-life version of quidditch, and he developed gameplay that would incorporate elements of lacrosse, dodgeball, and rugby. In October 2005, the first quadball game was played at Battell Beach in Middlebury, Vermont. Around 30 players showed up to play the game. Manshel's invention was not the first attempt to adapt the fictional sport, but USQ credits the workability of his rules and Benepe's ability to attract media attention toward Manshel's version becoming the most widely played. By the end of Middlebury College's 2006 spring semester, the college had ten intramural quadball teams.

In 2007, the first quadball World Cup was played between Middlebury College and Vassar College. By then, quadball had become the most popular club on campus at Middlebury College. In 2008, students took a spring break road trip to see quadball played at six college campuses in the Mid-Atlantic. This trip was aired on MTV, increasing interest in the game. The third world cup, held at Middlebury, took place in October 2009 with 2,000 spectators and 21 teams which made it the biggest tournament to date. Middlebury won each of the first three World Cups. Benepe, who graduated in spring 2009, served in an advisory role for the tournament.

=== International Quidditch Association (2010–2014) ===
In March 2010, Benepe, under some guidance from Andrew Slack, then-executive director of Fandom Forward, incorporated the International Quidditch Association as a 501(c)(3) organization. Its initial board of directors was made up of six organizers from around the country, and the organization began working in earnest with a mailing list of more than 200 teams in formation. The board held its first meeting in May 2010.

The International Quidditch Association's first decision was to move the World Cup from Middlebury to Manhattan, with the beliefs that more teams and spectators could be accommodated, and that more buzz for the sport could be generated in the country's media capital. IQA World Cup IV, a two-day event held in Manhattan in 2010 and organized by Benepe and IQA board member Alicia Radford, drew 46 teams from 12 states and one Canadian province. The tournament also drew 15,000 spectators and widespread media attention, receiving coverage from several news and sports outlets, including The New York Times and ESPN.

In February 2011, the first Trans-Continental game was played between students of Vassar College in New York and University of Vaasa in Finland. In March 2011, the USQ held its first regional tournament called the Swamp Cup in Gainesville, Florida. In November 2011, 96 teams competed in IQA World Cup V on Randall's Island in New York. At the end of 2011, the IQA contracted OAN Sports & Marketing, a Florida firm that pitches sporting events to city tourism bureaus. Seven cities submitted bids to host IQA events, the bid for IQA World Cup VI being awarded to Kissimmee, Florida.

In July 2012 the International Quidditch Association hosted the 2012 IQA Summer Games in Oxford, United Kingdom. In September 2012, the United States Quadball Association formed a referee development team which trains individuals to become referees in the sport. For the 2012–2013 season, regional championships were used for the first time to determine World Cup qualification. In 2013, the IQA launched a referee certification program, and within six months more than 90 head referees had been certified and had officiated at more than 65 tournaments, Also in 2013, the sport was televised for the first time in history in Toledo, Ohio featured on Buckeye Cable Sports Network. The televised match pitted Bowling Green State University against in-state rivals the University of Toledo, where BGSU swept Toledo in a best of three series.

=== US Quidditch (2014–2022) ===
In the summer of 2014, the IQA rebranded as US Quidditch, becoming the national governing body for the sport in the United States, and a new, separate organization was founded under the International Quidditch Associaton name to govern the sport internationally. This also constituted a rebranding of the league championship tournament, henceforth being referred to as US Quidditch Cup. At the time of the split, there were, 54 teams outside the United States.

World Cup 8, held in 2-15, introduced a Swiss-system tournament format, and received the 2015 Sports Travel Award for Best-Single-Sport Collegiate Event. Around the same time, the organization adopted its first strategic plan. 2015 also saw the foundation of the second quadball league in the United States, Major League Quadball, by Amanda Dallas and Ethan Sturm. This would be a summer league that would not directly compete with the fall and spring seasons of USQ.

Due to domestic membership slowing in the late 2010s, USQ separated college and club play in the 2017–2018 season, resulting in the USQ Quidditch Cup 11 in 2018 having two separate championship winners, with the University of Rochester winning the collegiate championship bracket and the club team Texas Cavalry winning the club championship bracket. During the COVID-19 pandemic, USQ cancelled in-person tournaments, holding events virtually throughout the season as a method of retaining membership.

=== US Quadball (2022–present) ===
Following a poll of members, USQ changed its name from "US Quidditch" to "US Quadball" in July 2022. The move was carried out jointly with Major League Quadball and cited what the organization considered to be Harry Potter author J. K. Rowling's anti-transgender stance and the film studio Warner Bros. owning trademarks on the word "Quidditch" The name refers to the number of balls used in the sport and the number of positions held in the field.

In August 2025, Dallas became CEO of USQ. Dallas created a collegiate growth department and its first youth department.

== Rules ==
=== Rulebook ===
As the sport has grown nationally, and globally, USQ has issued a number of rule books which have formed the basis of many other national leagues rules, with some using the USQ rules exactly whilst others, like Quidditch Canada and QuidditchUK, have altered their rules to best suit their leagues' play style. The current rulebook is the thirteenth edition.

=== Summary ===
A quadball arena consists of 3 hoops at each of the two shorter ends of the field. A team requires three chasers, one keeper, two beaters, and one seeker. Using the quaffle (volleyball) while riding broomsticks, the chasers are in charge of scoring points by passing, running, or kicking the ball to their teammates or into the hoops. The keeper guards the hoops and acts as a fourth chaser, while the beaters use bludgers (dodgeballs) to move players out of the way as a means of pushing and blocking. Beaters may also throw the bludgers at the opposing team as a means to "knock them out," causing them to have to tag their own hoop before rejoining play. The seeker must catch the snitch, a neutral person who has attached a Golden Snitch (a yellow velcro tail) to the back of their waist; catching the snitch is worth 30 points. The match ends once the snitch is caught by a seeker. If the snitch is caught and the score is tied, the game goes into overtime. Quadball is a uniquely gender-inclusive contact sport - following the "four maximum" rule. This means that there can be no more than four players of the same gender on the field at the same time; when the seekers are released, this number increases to five.

== Teams in the US ==
Teams are either collegiate- or community-based. Teams registered with the USQ are divided into eight regions: Northeast, Mid-Atlantic, Midwest, Great Lakes, West, South, Southwest, and Northwest.
