= IQA World Cup IV =

- 2010

Tournament information
- Sport: Quidditch
- Location: New York City
- Dates: 14–18 November 2010
- Administrator: International Quidditch Association
- Tournament format(s): Pool play Single elimination bracket
- Venue(s): DeWitt Clinton Park
- Teams: 46

Final positions
- Champion: Middlebury College
- Runner-up: Tufts University

The IQA World Cup IV was the 2010 edition of the IQA World Cup (now the US Quidditch Cup), a quidditch club tournament then organized by the International Quidditch Association.

The tournament was hosted in New York City at DeWitt Clinton Park. It was the first year that the cup was hosted in outside Middlebury, Vermont.

The World Cup featured 46 teams and 757 players from Canada and the United States. The IQA set a record with 40 media outlets and 20,000 spectators attending the tournament all together.

On August 15, 2010, the IQA announced that New York University would be hosting the tournament, making it the first time the World Cup was played in a major city.

== Bracket ==
Middlebury College won the bracket 100–50 against Tufts University.

First round
Boston	140
Minnesota	50
Tom's River Hydras	0
Ive's Pond	30
Texas A&M	230
Michigan State	40
Tufts	80
Vermont	10
Massachusetts	10
Yale	40
Vassar	60
Lafayette	10
McGill	90
Harvard	10
Penn State	70
NYU	30

Round of 16
Pittsburgh Q.C.	110
Boston	20
Rochester	40
Ive's Pond	50
Emerson	70
Texas A&M	50
Tufts	120
Chestnut Hill	40
Louisiana State	110
Yale	40
St. Lawrence	10
Vassar	80
Villanova	80
McGill	20
Penn State	0
Middlebury	110

Quarter-finals
Pittsburgh Q.C.	110
Ive's Pond	10
Emerson	50
Tufts	60
Louisiana State	40
Vassar	70
Villanova	20
Middlebury	110

Semi-finals
Pittsburgh Q.C.	40
Tufts	50
Vassar	0
Middlebury	60

Final
Tufts	50
Middlebury	100
