= IQA World Cup III =

- 2009

Tournament information
- Sport: Quidditch
- Location: Middlebury, Vermont
- Dates: 25–26 October 2009
- Administrator: Intercollegiate Quidditch Association
- Tournament format(s): Pool play Single elimination bracket
- Host(s): University of South Carolina
- Venue(s): Middlebury College
- Teams: 21

Final positions
- Champion: Middlebury College
- Runner-up: Emerson College

The IQA World Cup III was the 2009 edition of the IQA World Cup (now the US Quidditch Cup), a quidditch club tournament then organized by the Intercollegiate Quidditch Association. It was held on Sunday, October 25, 2009, at Middlebury College in Middlebury, Vermont.

Hosting team Middlebury College won the tournament. They won all six games they played, and defeated Emerson College 60–10 in the final. Middlebury has won the first five IQA World Cup.

== Qualifying teams ==
Boston

- Boston University
- Emerson College
- Harvard University
- University of Massachusetts Amherst

IPD/Big 3

- Ive's Pond Quidditch Club
- University of Pittsburgh
- Syracuse University
- Vassar College

(MV)^2

- Louisiana State University
- Middlebury College
- Texas A&M University
- Virginia Commonwealth University

North

- Green Mountain College
- McGill University
- St. Lawrence University
- University of Vermont

Pennsylvania

- Chestnut Hill College
- Lafayette College
- Moravian College
- Villanova University

University of Miami

== Bracket phase ==
Round of 12
Boston
Lafayette
Louisiana State
Villanova
Vermont
McGill
Emerson
Syracuse
Vassar
Green Mountain
Texas A&M
Pittsburgh

Quarter-finals
Boston
Villanova
McGill
Middlebury
Emerson
Green Mountain
Pittsburgh
Chestnut Hill

Semi-finals
Boston
Middlebury
Emerson
Pittsburgh

Final
Middlebury	60
Emerson	10

== See also ==
- Muggle quidditch
- International Quidditch Association
