= US Quadball Cup =

US quadball tournament

Tournament information
- Sport: Quadball
- Month played: April
- Established: 2007
- Administrator: US Quadball
- Format: Pool Play, Bracket Play
- Participants: 60

Current champion
- 2026: Creighton University (collegiate), Texas Hill Country Heat (club)

The US Quadball Cup, previously known as US Quidditch Cup and IQA World Cup, is a quadball tournament held in the United States and organized by US Quadball. The first US Quadball Cup was held in 2007 with only two teams participating, and now features around 60 collegiate and club teams from around the United States.

== History ==
The first intercollegiate Quidditch World Cup was held in 2007 at Middlebury College in Vermont, between Middlebury and Vassar College from Poughkeepsie, New York. Since then, the US Quadball Cup has been held in various places in the continental United States. On average, there are 60 or so teams present that proceed to pool play, where teams are grouped and the top teams from the group advance to bracket play.

The 2014 edition was the last event to be called "IQA World Cup". Thereafter, the International Quidditch Association became an international sports federation and the organization of the Cup was handed over to US Quadball. Since 2016, the Cup was renamed to "US Quidditch Cup" and the name "IQA World Cup" now refers to an international competition featuring national teams.

Beginning with the 2017-2018 season, there was a split between college and club level play, resulting in separate regional and national championships for club and collegiate teams.

The tournament was not held in 2020 or 2021 due to the COVID-19 pandemic. When the tournament resumed in 2022, it was rebranded as "US Quidditch Cup 2022" rather than "US Quidditch Cup 13."

== Format ==
=== Participation ===
Locations of the US Quadball Cups

In order to participate in qualification, a team must be registered with USQ. Teams can be either college teams, or community teams. College teams are teams based at a college or university and have only its students on the team; these make up the vast majority of registered quadball teams. A community team is a private club team made up of interested players around the area. Each community team may has its own rules when it comes to trying out or joining the team, and college students may opt to join a community team over their college team. In 2016, Q.C. Boston was the first club team to win the cup. Once a team is started and registered, they may compete in official tournaments.

=== Qualification ===
Qualification is achieved through placement in Regional Championships. There are 8 different regions: Great Lakes, Mid-Atlantic, Midwest, Northeast, Northwest, South, Southwest, and West. The Regional Championships, played in tournament form, take place from November to February, with the US Quadball Cup taking place in April. Placing at certain level in each of the respective region's championships (specifics vary per region), which are played in tournament form, will guarantee a berth at the US Quadball Cup.

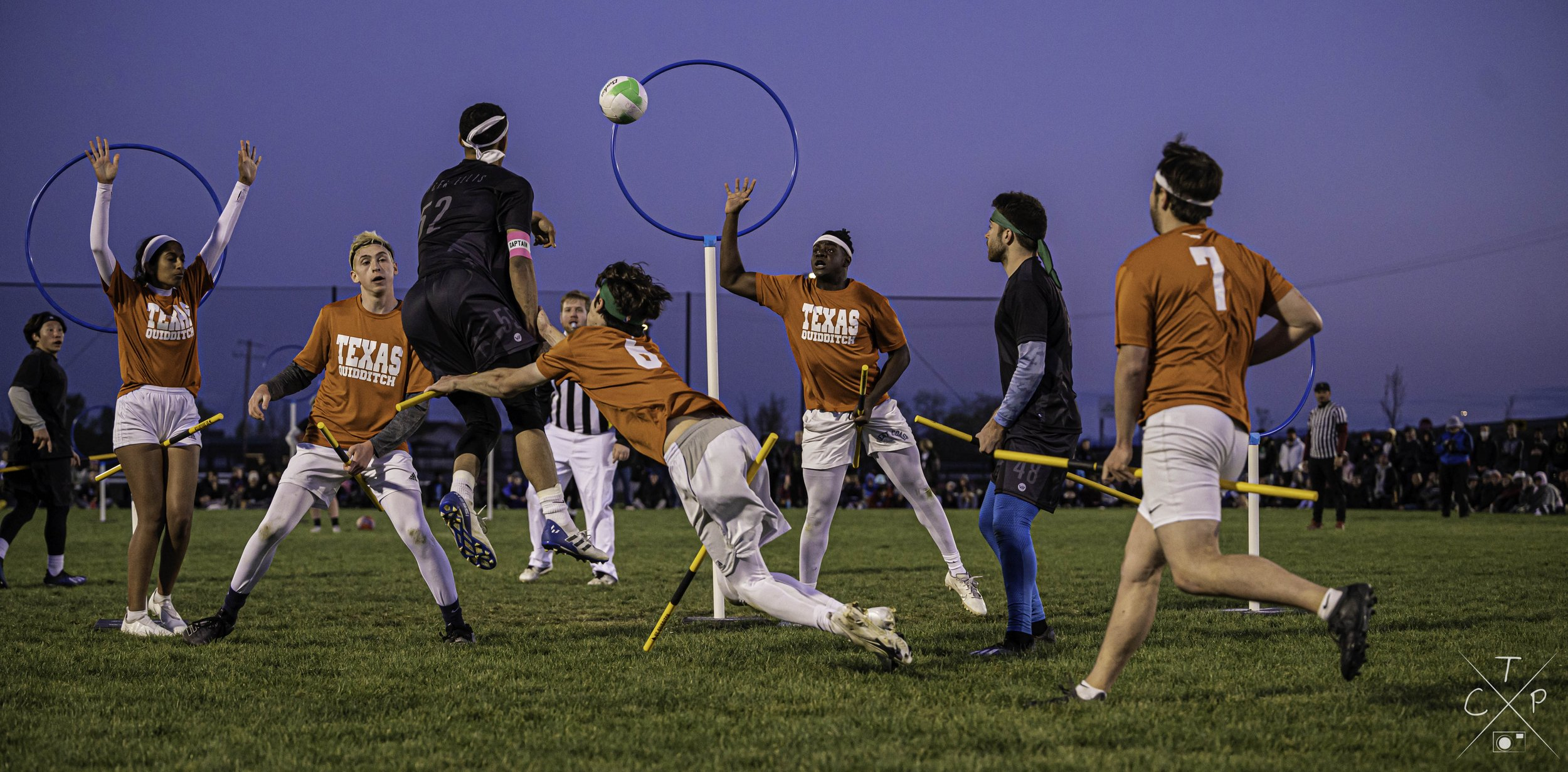
US Quadball Cup 2022 Finals between Creighton University and University of Texas

=== Gameplay ===
==== Pool Play ====
Before the day of the event, all attending teams are sorted into 12 pools of 5 based on their seeding. Seeding is based on a complex algorithm measuring each team's wins, point differentials, snitch grab percentages and strength of schedule at their respective Regional Championships. After each team plays the other four in their pool, all the teams are ranked by the same algorithm. The top 28 teams get a spot in a seeded round-robin bracket and 29-36 join the play-in round, a pre-bracket playoff round of four games to determine the last 4 teams to join the bracket.

==== Bracket Play ====
On day 2 of the competition, starting with a round of 32, teams are matched up and the winner of each match proceeds to the next round until a champion is determined.

== Results ==
Name	Edition	Year	Host	Champion	Champion (Collegiate)	Champion (Club)
IQA World Cup	I	2007	Middlebury, Vermont	(Vermont) Middlebury College		
IQA World Cup	II	2008	Middlebury, Vermont	(Vermont) Middlebury College		
IQA World Cup	III	2009	Middlebury, Vermont	(Vermont) Middlebury College		
IQA World Cup	IV	2010	(New York (state)) New York City	(Vermont) Middlebury College		
IQA World Cup	V	2011	(New York (state)) New York City	(Vermont) Middlebury College		
IQA World Cup	VI	2013	Kissimmee, Florida	University of Texas at Austin		
IQA World Cup	VII	2014	North Myrtle Beach, South Carolina	University of Texas at Austin		
USQ World Cup	8	2015	Rock Hill, South Carolina	University of Texas at Austin		
US Quidditch Cup	9	2016	Columbia, South Carolina	(Massachusetts) Quidditch Club Boston		
US Quidditch Cup	10	2017	Kissimmee, Florida	Texas Cavalry		
US Quidditch Cup	11	2018	Round Rock, Texas		(New York (state)) University of Rochester	Texas Cavalry
US Quidditch Cup	12	2019	Round Rock, Texas		University of Texas at Austin	Texas Cavalry
US Quidditch Cup	2022	2022	Salt Lake City, Utah		University of Texas at Austin	Texas Hill Country Heat
US Quadball Cup	2023	2023	(Pennsylvania) Conshohocken, PA		University of Texas San Antonio	(New Jersey) The Warriors
US Quadball Cup	2024	2024	Round Rock, Texas		(Massachusetts) Harvard University	(Illinois) Boom Train
US Quadball Cup	2025	2025	Richmond, VA		Creighton University	(New Jersey) The Warriors

== See also ==
- Quadball
- US Quadball
- Major League Quidditch
- International Quadball Association
