= IQA World Cup V =

2011 quidditch tournament

- 2011

Tournament information
- Sport: Quidditch
- Location: Randalls Island, New York City
- Dates: 12–13 November 2011
- Administrator: International Quidditch Association
- Tournament format(s): Pool play Single elimination bracket
- Venue: Icahn Stadium
- Teams: 96

Final positions
- Champion: Middlebury College
- Runner-up: University of Florida

The IQA World Cup V was the 2011 edition of the IQA World Cup (now the US Quidditch Cup), a quidditch club tournament then organized by the International Quidditch Association. It was hosted at Icahn Stadium on Randalls Island in New York City on November 12–13.

The Cup featured 96 teams from five countries competing in three divisions. This marked the first time that teams from outside North America competed, with Argentina, Finland and New Zealand sending one team each. Teams were allowed to register between 7 and 21 players, allowing up to 2,000 athletes to participate. Division 1 featured 60 teams, Division 2 featured 24 teams, and the High School division featured 8 teams.

Besides the sports games, the event also included a two-day festival. A variety of entertainers, foods, and wizardry shops took over the Island, while musical artists performed during breaks in game play.

Division 1 semi-finals saw Middlebury College defeating Texas A&M 80*–70, and the University of Florida winning 70*–60 against the University of Minnesota. Middlebury College won the finals 100*–80 against University of Florida, thus becoming champions for the fifth consecutive time. Purdue University won the Division 2 final 60*–20 against Rochester Institute of Technology.

The Cup was profiled in Eric Hansen's Outside piece, "Quoosiers", and in the 2014 documentary Mudbloods.

== See also ==
- Muggle quidditch
- International Quidditch Association
