= IQA World Cup VI =

- 2013

Tournament information
- Sport: Quidditch
- Location: Kissimmee, FL
- Dates: 13–14 April 2013
- Administrator: International Quidditch Association
- Tournament format(s): Pool play Single elimination bracket
- Venue(s): Austin-Tindall Regional Park
- Teams: 77 (60 in D1, 17 in D2)

Final positions
- Champion: University of Texas
- Runner-up: UCLA

The IQA World Cup VI was the 2013 edition of the IQA World Cup (now the US Quidditch Cup), a quidditch club tournament then organized by the International Quidditch Association. The tournament was hosted in Kissimmee, Florida from April 13–14, 2013.

The Cup featured 77 teams from 4 countries. Sixty of the teams competed in the D1 division, and 17 teams competed in the D2 division. The D1 winner was University of Texas, who defeated UCLA in the championship match. This marked the first time that Middlebury College did not win the Cup. The D2 division was won by Sam Houston State University who defeated Loyola University New Orleans, making the championships an all-Texas affair.

Due to the increasingly large number of official member teams, Division 1 was not open to all comers and was limited to 60 teams who earned their spot in the World Cup by competing in regional tournaments. Division 2 consisted of other official teams who did not earn their spot at regionals but still wanted to compete.

== D1 division ==
=== Qualifying teams ===
World

- Paris Phénix (Paris, France)
- Tec Quidditch (Monterrey, Mexico)
- Qwertryians Tijuana (Tijuana, Mexico)

Eastern Canada

- Fleming College (Peterborough, Ontario)
- University of Ottawa (Ottawa, Ontario)
- University of Toronto (Toronto, Ontario)

United States - Mid-Atlantic Division

- Johns Hopkins University (Baltimore, Maryland)
- Penn State University (State College, Pennsylvania)
- QC Carolinas (Winston-Salem, North Carolina)
- QC Pittsburg (Pittsburgh, Pennsylvania)
- University of Maryland (College Park, Maryland)
- University of Richmond (Richmond, Virginia)
- Villanova University (Philadelphia, Pennsylvania)
- Virginia Commonwealth University (Richmond, Virginia)

United States - Midwest Division

- Ball State University (Muncie, Indiana)
- Bowling Green State University (Bowling Green, Ohio)
- Central Michigan University (Mt. Pleasant, Michigan)
- Illinois State University (Normal, Illinois)
- University of Kansas (Lawrence, Kansas)
- Loyola University Chicago (Chicago, Illinois)
- Marquette University (Milwaukee, Wisconsin)
- Michigan State University (East Lansing, Michigan)
- Ohio State University (Columbus, Ohio)
- Purdue University (West Lafayette, Indiana)
- University of Michigan (Ann Arbor, Michigan)
- University of Minnesota (Minneapolis, Minnesota)

United States - Northeast Region

- Boston Riot (Boston, Massachusetts)
- Boston University (Boston, Massachusetts)
- Emerson College (Boston, Massachusetts)
- Hofstra University (Hempstead, New York)
- Macaulay Honors College (New York, New York)
- New York University (New York, New York)
- Rochester Institute of Technology (Rochester, New York)
- SUNY Geneseo (Geneseo, New York)
- Tufts University (Boston, Massachusetts)
- University of Massachusetts (Amherst, Massachusetts)
- University of Rochester (Rochester, New York)

United States - South Region

- Florida State University (Tallahassee, Florida)
- Tennessee Tech University (Cookeville, Tennessee)
- University of Florida (Gainesville, Florida)
- University of Miami (Miami, Florida)
- University of South Florida (Tampa, Florida)
- University of Southern Mississippi (Hattiesburg, Mississippi)

United States - Southwest Region

- Austin Quidditch (Austin, Texas)
- Baylor University (Waco, Texas)
- LSU (Baton Rouge, Louisiana)
- Oklahoma State University (Stillwater, Oklahoma)
- Roadrunner Quidditch (UTSA) (San Antonio, Texas)
- Silver Phoenix (College Station, Texas)
- Texas A&M University (College Station, Texas)
- University of Arkansas (Fayetteville, Arkansas)
- University of Texas (Austin, Texas)

United States - West Region

- Arizona State University (Phoenix, Arizona)
- Lost Boys (Los Angeles, California)
- Northern Arizona University (Flagstaff, Arizona)
- Silicon Valley Skrewts (Mountain View, California)
- University of California, Berkeley (Berkeley, California)
- University of California, Los Angeles (Los Angeles, California)
- University of Southern California (Los Angeles, California)

=== Format ===
The format of the Cup was pool play, followed by a 36-team bracket. The 60 teams were divided into 12 pools of 5 teams each. Each team played the 4 other teams in their pool, and the top 3 teams from each pool advanced to the 36-team bracket.

==== Pools ====
Pool 1

Team	Pld	W	L	PF	PA	Diff
University of Kansas	4	4	0	570	190	+380
Baylor University	4	3	1	580	170	+410
Virginia Commonwealth University	4	2	2	320	390	−70
UC Berkeley	4	1	3	190	530	−340
Qwertyrians	4	0	4	140	520	−380

Pool 2

Team	Pld	W	L	PF	PA	Diff
Penn State University	4	4	0	510	170	+340
Silicon Valley Skrewts	4	3	1	440	380	+60
Rochester Institute of Technology	4	2	2	320	360	−40
University of Florida	4	1	3	310	350	−40
Loyola University Chicago	4	0	4	270	590	−320

Pool 3

Team	Pld	W	L	PF	PA	Diff
Texas A&M University	4	4	0	630	250	+380
University of Michigan	4	3	1	550	330	+220
New York University	4	2	2	560	410	+150
Johns Hopkins University	4	1	3	500	550	−50
Fleming College	4	0	4	130	830	−700

Pool 4

Team	Pld	W	L	PF	PA	Diff
University of Southern California	4	4	0	420	210	+210
Emerson College	4	3	1	370	180	+190
University of South Florida	4	2	2	300	380	−80
University of Minnesota	4	1	3	240	330	−90
Roadrunner Quidditch	4	0	4	260	490	−230

Pool 5

Team	Pld	W	L	PF	PA	Diff
UCLA	4	4	0	790	140	+650
University of Rochester	4	3	1	290	380	−90
Bowling Green State University	4	2	2	410	400	+10
Paris Phénix	4	1	3	300	530	−230
Oklahoma State University	4	0	4	220	560	−340

Pool 6

Team	Pld	W	L	PF	PA	Diff
Northern Arizona University*	4	3	1	340	290	+50
University of Ottawa	4	3	1	370	230	+140
Marquette University	4	2	2	310	350	-40
Florida State University	4	1	3	300	370	−70
Boston Riot	4	1	3	230	310	−80

- Note: Northern Arizona defeated Ottawa head-to-head to win the bracket

Pool 7

Team	Pld	W	L	PF	PA	Diff
Michigan State University	4	4	0	560	170	+390
Texas State University	4	3	1	530	190	+340
QC Pittsburg	4	2	2	470	240	+230
SUNY Geneseo	4	1	3	250	390	−140
University of Toronto	4	0	4	20	840	−820

Pool 8

Team	Pld	W	L	PF	PA	Diff
Boston University	4	4	0	540	170	+370
Central Michigan University	4	3	1	330	210	+120
Villanova University	4	2	2	380	220	+160
Austin Quidditch	4	1	3	340	260	+80
Tec Quidditch	4	0	4	40	770	−730

Pool 9

Team	Pld	W	L	PF	PA	Diff
Hofstra University	4	4	0	480	170	+310
Ball State University	4	3	1	380	200	+180
Tennessee Tech University	4	2	2	320	320	+0
Silver Phoenixes	4	1	3	200	490	-290
QC Carolinas	4	0	4	150	350	−200

Pool 10

Team	Pld	W	L	PF	PA	Diff
University of Texas	4	4	0	580	100	+480
Ohio State University	4	2	2	250	260	-10
Tufts University	4	2	2	320	340	-20
University of Richmond	4	2	2	270	310	-40
University of Southern Mississippi	4	0	4	60	470	−410

Pool 11

Team	Pld	W	L	PF	PA	Diff
Lost Boys	4	4	0	560	170	+390
University of Maryland	4	3	1	490	270	+220
University of Arkansas	4	2	2	350	280	+70
Macaulay Honors College	4	1	3	240	490	-250
Illinois State University	4	0	4	180	610	−430

Pool 12

Team	Pld	W	L	PF	PA	Diff
University of Miami	4	4	0	520	170	+350
LSU	4	3	1	530	210	+320
Arizona State University	4	2	2	290	270	+20
Purdue University	4	1	3	180	380	-200
University of Massachusetts	4	0	4	110	600	−490

==== Bracket ====
The 36 teams advancing from pool play were seeded 1 through 36. Seeds 29-36 played in four games to arrive at the final 32 teams, from which a standard elimination bracket ensued.

- 35 Seed RIT defeated 36 Seed USF to face UCLA in the first round.
- 30 Seed Arizona State defeated 29 Seed Villanova to face Boston University in the first round.
- 31 Seed Bowling Green defeated 32 Seed Tennessee Tech to face University of Miami in the first round.
- 33 Seed Virginia Commonwealth defeated 34 Seed Tufts to face University of Texas in the first round.

First Round
1	UCLA	130
35	RIT	20
17	Emerson	110
16	Texas State	60
9	Michigan State	100
24	Univ of Rochester	50
25	Marquette	70
8	Kansas	120
5	Hofstra	30
28	Arkansas	70
21	SV Skrewts	60
12	Northern Arizona	90
13	Baylor	80
20	Ottawa	30
30	Arizona State	50
4	Boston U	100
3	Miami	50
31	Bowling Green	80
19	Michigan	30
14	Maryland	100
11	USC	120
22	Central Michigan	30
27	NYU	70
6	Lost Boys	160
7	Texas A&M	230
26	QC Pittsburg	60
23	Ohio State	70
10	Penn State	30
15	LSU	90
18	Ball State	70
33	VCU	20
2	Texas	190

Second Round
1	UCLA	130
17	Emerson	50
9	Michigan State	60
8	Kansas	120
28	Arkansas	50
12	Northern Arizona	70
13	Baylor	120
4	Boston U	20
31	Bowling Green	90
14	Maryland	60
11	USC	20
6	Lost Boys	130
7	Texas A&M	130
23	Ohio State	60
15	LSU	20
2	Texas	140

Quarterfinals
1	UCLA	140
8	Kansas	60
12	Northern Arizona	50
13	Baylor	150
31	Bowling Green	230
6	Lost Boys	210
7	Texas A&M	40
2	Texas	200

Semifinals
1	UCLA	200
13	Baylor	130
31	Bowling Green	50
2	Texas	140

Finals
1	UCLA	80
2	Texas	190

== D2 division ==
=== Teams entered ===
- Brevard Community College (Brevard County, Florida)
- CAMPS Quidditch (Bridgewater, Massachusetts)
- College of Charleston (Charleston, South Carolina)
- Florida Atlantic University (Boca Raton, Florida)
- Loyola University (NO) (New Orleans, Louisiana)
- Miami University (Oxford, Ohio)
- NY Badassilisks (New York, New York)
- Rice University (Houston, Texas)
- Ringling College of Art and Design (Sarasota, Florida)
- Sam Houston State University (Huntsville, Texas)
- Stanford University (Stanford, California)
- Syracuse University (Syracuse, New York)
- University of Central Florida (Orlando, Florida)
- University of South Alabama (Mobile, Alabama)
- University of South Carolina (Columbia, South Carolina)
- University of Toledo (Toledo, Ohio)
- Winthrop University (Rock Hill, South Carolina)

=== Format ===
The format of the D2 division was pool play, followed by a 12-team bracket. The 17 teams were divided into 4 pools - 3 with 4 teams each, and 1 pool with 5 teams. Each team played the 3 or 4 other teams in their pool, and the top 3 teams from each pool moved on to the 12-team bracket. Within the bracket, the top 4 seeds got a vie into the second round, and seeds 5-12 played the opening round games.

==== Pools ====
Pool 1

Pos	Team	Pld	W	L	PF	PA	PD	Qualification
1	Rice University	3	2	1	260	230	+30	Qualified for quarterfinals
2	NY Badassilisks	3	2	1	270	210	+60	Qualified for bracket phase
3	Florida Atlantic University	3	2	1	180	170	+10	Qualified for bracket phase
4	Winthrop University	3	0	3	180	280	−100	

Pool 2

Pos	Team	Pld	W	L	PF	PA	PD	Qualification
1	Stanford University	3	3	0	330	130	+200	Qualified for quarterfinals
2	Brevard Community College	3	2	1	220	260	−40	Qualified for bracket phase
3	University of South Carolina	3	1	2	240	300	−60	Qualified for bracket phase
4	University of Central Florida	3	0	3	210	310	−100	

Pool 3

Pos	Team	Pld	W	L	PF	PA	PD	Qualification
1	Sam Houston State	3	3	0	350	90	+260	Qualified for quarterfinals
2	University of Toledo	3	2	1	220	140	+80	Qualified for bracket phase
3	Syracuse University	3	1	2	80	240	−160	Qualified for bracket phase
4	University of Central Florida	3	0	3	100	280	−180	

Pool 4

Pos	Team	Pld	W	L	PF	PA	PD	Qualification
1	Loyola University (NO)	4	4	0	380	240	+140	Qualified for quarterfinals
2	Miami University	4	3	1	430	200	+230	Qualified for bracket phase
3	Ringling College	4	2	2	320	270	+50	Qualified for bracket phase
4	College of Charleston	4	1	3	220	340	−120	
5	University of South Alabama	4	0	4	190	490	−300	

==== Bracket ====
First Round
8	Brevard	70
9	NY Badassilisks	40
5	Miami (OH)	190
12	Syracuse	20
6	Toledo	20
11	South Carolina	100
7	Florida Atlantic	40
10	Ringling	110

Quarterfinals
1	Sam Houston St	70
8	Brevard	10
5	Miami (OH)	80
4	Rice	10
3	Loyola (NO)	60
11	South Carolina	50
10	Ringling	200
2	Stanford	100

Semifinals
1	Sam Houston St	50
5	Miami (OH)	10
3	Loyola (NO)	90
10	Ringling	80

Championship
1	Sam Houston St	110
3	Loyola (NO)	70

== See also ==
- Muggle quidditch
- International Quidditch Association
