= US Quidditch Cup 9 =

- 2016
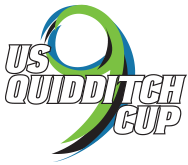

Tournament information
- Sport: Quidditch
- Location: Columbia, SC
- Dates: 16–17 April 2016
- Administrator: US Quidditch
- Tournament format(s): Pool play Single elimination bracket
- Host: University of South Carolina
- Venue: Saluda Shoals Park
- Teams: 60

Final positions
- Champion: Quidditch Club Boston
- Runner-up: Rochester United

Tournament statistics
- Matches played: 155

The US Quidditch Cup 9 was the 2016 edition of the US Quidditch Cup, a quidditch club tournament organized by US Quidditch. The tournament was held in Columbia, South Carolina from April 16–17, 2016.

The Cup featured 59 teams from the United States and one from Canada that qualified through eight regional championships. Quidditch Club Boston won the Cup, defeating Rochester United in overtime, 140–130* in the finals.

== Format ==
The 60 teams that qualified were divided into 12 pools of five teams each. Each team played against all other teams in their pool, and the three best teams of each pool advanced to the bracket phase. For the bracket phase, the 36 teams that advanced were seeded 1 to 36. Seeds 29–36 confronted each other in a play-in round to determine the four teams that would join seeds 1–28 for the round of 32.

== Results ==
=== Bracket phase ===
In the semifinals, Rochester United beat the Ball State Cardinals 150*–110, while Quidditch Club Boston defeated the Lone Star Quidditch Club 90*–80. Quidditch Club Boston and Rochester United faced off in the finals, resulting in a 140–130* victory for Quidditch Club Boston.

Play-in round
Oklahoma State | 100*
S.V. Skrewts | 50
The Warriors | 190*
California | 90
George Mason | 50*
Crimson Elite | 80^
Fighting Farmers | 170*
Appalachian | 40

Round of 32
Texas | 170*
Oklahoma State | 80
Maryland | 50
Ball State | 130*
Texas A&M | 130*
Southern Storm | 60
G.C. Gumbeaux | 90
Lost Boys | 200*
Rochester United | 120*
Miami (FL) | 60
Penn State | 140*
North Carolina | 100
L.A. Gambits | 160^
Sam Houston | 140*
The Warriors | 110*
Michigan | 80
Lone Star Q.C. | 130
Crimson Elite | 50*
Arizona State | 60
Texas Cavalry | 150*
D.C.Q.C. | 90*
Kansas | 30
Texas Tech | 120
Boise State | 170*
Bowling Green | 110*
New York Q.C. | 50
Texas State | 190*
Rutgers | 50
R.P.I. | 290*
Boston University | 140
Fighting Farmers | 30
Q.C. Boston | 170*

Round of 16
Texas | 50
Ball State | 90*
Texas A&M | 50
Lost Boys | 110*
Rochester United | 110*
Penn State | 10
L.A. Gambits | 250*
The Warriors | 100
Lone Star Q.C. | 130*
Texas Cavalry | 20
D.C.Q.C. | 100*
Boise State | 130^
Bowling Green | 100*
Texas State | 50
R.P.I. | 70
Q.C. Boston | 160*

Quarter-finals
Ball State | 110*
Lost Boys | 80
Rochester United | 170*
L.A. Gambits | 60
Lone Star Q.C. | 160
Boise State | 60*
Bowling Green | 90
Q.C. Boston | 220*

Semi-finals
Ball State | 110
Rochester United | 150*
Lone Star Q.C. | 80
Q.C. Boston | 90*

Final
Rochester United | 130*
Q.C. Boston | 140
