= Major League Quadball =

- Current season, competition or edition: 2026 Major League Quidditch season
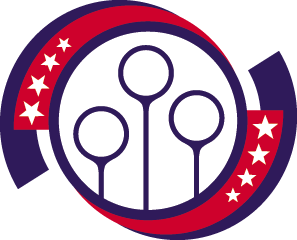
- Sport: Quidditch
- Founded: 23 March 2015
- Commissioner: Ethan Sturm; Amanda Dallas
- Divisions: 4
- No. of teams: 12
- Countries: Canada (1 team); United States (11 teams)
- Most recent champion: New York Titans
- Most titles: Austin Outlaws (5)
- Sponsor: Diaza Apparel
- International cup: Benepe Cup
- Website: MLQ Official Website

Major League Quadball (MLQ), formerly Major League Quidditch, is an amateur quidditch league in the United States and Canada. The league is composed of 12 city-based teams—11 in the U.S. and 1 in Canada. The MLQ season runs from June to August, with each team playing 12 games in the regular season. The playoffs includes the top 4 teams competing in the MLQ Championship in late August, culminating in the championship series. The winning team is awarded the Benepe Cup.

== History ==
Major League Quadball was founded in 2014 by Ethan Sturm, who joined with Amanda Dallas in hopes of elevating the sport of quidditch to higher levels of competition. Sturm and Dallas currently co-commission the league.

In December 2021, US Quadball (USQ) and Major League Quadball (MLQ) announced their intention to change their names to distance themselves from Harry Potter author J.K. Rowling's views on transgender people and to avoid potential legal battles with film studio Warner Bros., the distributor of the Harry Potter films and the owner of trademarks on the word "Quidditch". Following a poll of members, MLQ decided to change its name from "Major League Quiddich" to "Major League Quadball" in July 2022. The change was carried out jointly with US Quadball. The name refers to the number of balls used in the sport and the number of positions held in the field and was to be adopted following the conclusion of the 2022 MLQ championship.

== Structure ==
=== Current league structure ===
In its current structure, the league consists of three geographically divided divisions, each with five teams. Each team may have up to 30 players on their franchise roster, and may have up to 21 players rostered (and thus eligible to participate) in each series the team plays. Additionally, teams may have up to 18 players on their practice squad.

The North Division includes much of the geographic Midwest region of the United States, plus Toronto. The five teams in the North Division are the Minneapolis Monarchs, Chicago Prowl (previously the Indianapolis Intensity), Detroit Innovators, Cleveland Riff, and Toronto Raiders.

The East Division includes all MLQ teams in the geographic Northeast and Mid-Atlantic regions, plus Ottawa. The five teams in the East Division are the Boston Forge, Charlotte Aviators, New York Titans, Washington Admirals, and Ottawa Black Bears.

The South Division includes all MLQ teams in the geographic South Central region of the United States, plus Kansas City. The five teams in the South Division are the Austin Outlaws, San Antonio Soldados, League City Legends, New Orleans Curse, and Kansas City Stampede.

During the regular season, teams plays a three-game series against all other teams in their division throughout June and July. All three games are played in each series, regardless of the outcome of the first two games, though the team that wins at least 2 out of the 3 games is said to have won the series. Teams are ranked within their divisions as a result of these series' outcomes.

The top four teams in each division are then invited to the MLQ Championship in August. The top two teams from each division gain a bid directly to the quarterfinals of the championship bracket, while the third- and fourth-place teams get placed into the play-in bracket. In the play-in bracket, each matchup between teams is decided by a single game, as opposed to the usual three games played in the regular season. The play-in bracket yields two teams, which get slotted into the final two quarterfinal berths. From there, the eight teams play in a standard single-elimination bracket, with each matchup being a best-of-three series (similar to the regular season, with the exception that a third game is not played unless necessary to decide a winner), until a champion is crowned and wins the Benepe Cup.

Starting in 2018, teams sometimes play "SuperSeries" during the regular season, which involve three teams playing at one location over two days, with each team playing a full three-game series against the others. SuperSeries were developed in an attempt to save costs for the players.

=== Past league structures ===
The first season took place in 2015 with eight teams split into two divisions of four teams each. The North Division was composed of the Cleveland Riff, Detroit Innovators, Indianapolis Intensity, and Rochester Whiteout, and the East Division was composed of the Boston Night Riders (now the Boston Forge), New York Titans, Ottawa Black Bears, and Washington Admirals. MLQ had an extremely successful first season, picking up partnerships with Savage Apparel (now VII Apparel), Peterson's Brooms, and Destination Toledo, holding 12 regular-season, three-game series, and hosting the 2015 MLQ Championship in Toledo, Ohio.

In the 2016 season, MLQ doubled the size of the league to 16 teams and geographically expanded it with the creation of the South and West Division. The new teams were located in Austin, Kansas City, League City, New Orleans, Los Angeles, Phoenix, Salt Lake City, and San Francisco. The same sixteen teams competed in 2017.

In 2018, the Phoenix Sol relocated to Boise, Idaho as the Boise Grays. During the Boise Grays' first match of the 2018 season, a brawl broke out between the Grays and Salt Lake City Hive. MLQ immediately disbanded the Boise Grays for the remainder of the 2018 season as punishment for the brawl.

In 2019, MLQ reorganized the league into 3 divisions with 5 franchises in each division. As part of this reorganization, three changes happened: (1) all franchises in the West Division were disbanded due to long inter-divisional travel times, (2) three new teams were added to the remaining divisions (the Minneapolis Monarchs and the Toronto Raiders joined the North Division, while the San Antonio Soldados joined the South Division), and (3) Rochester Whiteout moved from the North Division to the East Division.

In 2021, Charlotte was added as an expansion franchise due to Ottawa and Toronto's inability to cross the border due to the COVID-19 pandemic restrictions. In this season, Charlotte took Ottawa's spot in the East and the North division only competed with 4 teams.

In 2022, with Toronto and Ottawa's return, Rochester Whiteout returned to the North (the division they had left upon the addition of Toronto and Minneapolis) and Ottawa rejoined the East. This left the North Division with six teams instead of the usual five, necessitating a new regular-season structure. For the first six weeks of the season, the North Division was split into two conferences of three teams, with Detroit, Minneapolis, and Chicago playing each other and Cleveland, Rochester, and Toronto playing each other. Each team played a three-game home series and a three-game away series within their conference during those opening six weeks. This gave them a final standing within their conference. Then, all six teams traveled to the North Division Championship. During that weekend, the North Divisional Champion was crowned and the division's four bids were handed out.

In 2024, MLQ indefinitely paused operations for the Rochester Whiteout franchise, citing a lack of quadball infrastructure in the Rochester area, as well as trouble fielding full rosters in previous seasons, and the departure of the team's head coach. With this change, the North Division returned to five teams, with the teams once again competing under the same regular-season structure as the East and South divisions.

In 2026, MLQ has made the difficult decision to pause franchise operations in Austin, New Orleans, and Ottawa. With the above changes, the league moving forward before beginning of the 2026 season with a 12-franchise teams. Then dividing those 12 teams into two conferences, each made up of two divisions.

=== Organizational structure ===
MLQ is a nonprofit run entirely by volunteers. All central operations - such as people operations, accounting, marketing, and administration - operate remotely, and there is no central headquarters for personnel.

MLQ has over 100 volunteers across 8 departments. Departments include: Gameplay; Finance; People Operations; Marketing; Creative; Digital Media; Diversity Equity & Inclusion; and Events. At the top of the organization are Commissioners Amanda Dallas and Ethan Sturm. Each of the 8 departments has a Director who oversees operations and reports to the Commissioners. Directors' departmental teams are composed of managers, coordinators, and assistants.

Franchise staff (such as coaches, assistant coaches, managers, and assistant managers) apply each season and are hired only for the duration of the MLQ season. Franchise staff select the rosters for their own teams.

Referees are hired on a series by series basis.

== Teams ==
Major League Quadball teams

Conference	Team	City	Joined
Eastern	Atlantic Division		
Eastern	Boston Forge	Boston, Massachusetts	2015
Eastern	New York Titans	New York City, New York	2015
Eastern	Washington Admirals	Washington, D.C.	2015
Eastern	Gateway Division		
Eastern	Charlotte Aviators	Charlotte, North Carolina	2021
Eastern	Cleveland Riff	Cleveland, Ohio	2015
Eastern	Detroit Innovators	Detroit, Michigan	2015
Central	Lakes Division		
Central	Chicago Prowl	Chicago, Illinois	2023
Central	Minneapolis Monarchs	Minneapolis, Minnesota	2019
Central	Toronto Raiders	Toronto, Ontario	2019
Central	Frontier Division		
Central	Houston Legends	Houston, Texas	2016
Central	Kansas City Stampede	Kansas City, Missouri	2016
Central	San Antonio Soldados	San Antonio, Texas	2019

=== Inactive Teams ===
Team	City	Division(s)	Years active	Fate
Phoenix Sol	Phoenix, Arizona	West	2016-2017	Relocated to Boise, ID, became Boise Grays.
Boise Grays	Boise, Idaho	West	2018	Dissolved for disciplinary reasons.
Salt Lake City Hive	Salt Lake City, Utah	West	2016-2018	Dissolved due to long travel time for play with other teams.
Los Angeles Guardians	Los Angeles, California	West	2016-2018	Dissolved due to long travel time for play with other teams.
San Francisco Argonauts	San Francisco, California	West	2016-2018	Dissolved due to long travel time for play with other teams.
Indianapolis Intensity	Indianapolis, Indiana	North	2015-2022	Relocated to Chicago, IL, became Chicago Prowl.
Rochester Whiteout	Rochester, New York	North, East	2015-2023	Placed on "indefinite pause" due to lack of local quadball infrastructure.
Ottawa Black Bears	Ottawa, Ontario	East	2015-2025	Placed on "indefinite pause" due to lack of local quadball infrastructure.
Austin Outlaws	Austin, Texas	South	2016-2025	Placed on "indefinite pause" due to lack of local quadball infrastructure.
New Orleans Curse	New Orleans, Louisiana	South	2016-2025	Placed on "indefinite pause" due to lack of local quadball infrastructure.

=== Expansion Teams ===
Team	Division	Year Franchise Granted
Phoenix Sol	West	2016
Salt Lake City Hive	West	2016
Los Angeles Guardians	West	2016
San Francisco Argonauts	West	2016
Minneapolis Monarchs	North	2019
Toronto Raiders	North	2019
San Antonio Soldados	South	2019
Charlotte Aviators^	East	2021

The West Division was eliminated at the end of the 2018 season due to extensive travel time for the teams. In addition to the 3-team expansion in 2019, the Rochester Whiteout were moved from the North Division to the East.

With the addition of Charlotte in 2021 (and their retention for 2022), and the return of Toronto and Ottawa for 2022, Rochester was moved back into the North Division.

^The Charlotte Aviators temporarily joined the East Division as an MLQ Trial Expansion Team* for the 2021 season and were invited to return in the same capacity in 2022.

== League champions ==
Year	Team
2015	Boston Forge (Prev. Boston Night Riders)
2016	Boston Forge (Prev. Boston Night Riders)
2017	Austin Outlaws
2018	Austin Outlaws
2019	Boston Forge (Prev. Boston Night Riders)
2020	N/A (Season Cancelled)
2021	Austin Outlaws
2022	Austin Outlaws
2023	Austin Outlaws
2024	New York Titans
2025	San Antonio Soldados
2026	New York Titans
