= Quidditch (real-life sport) =

Sport based on the fictional game from Harry Potter

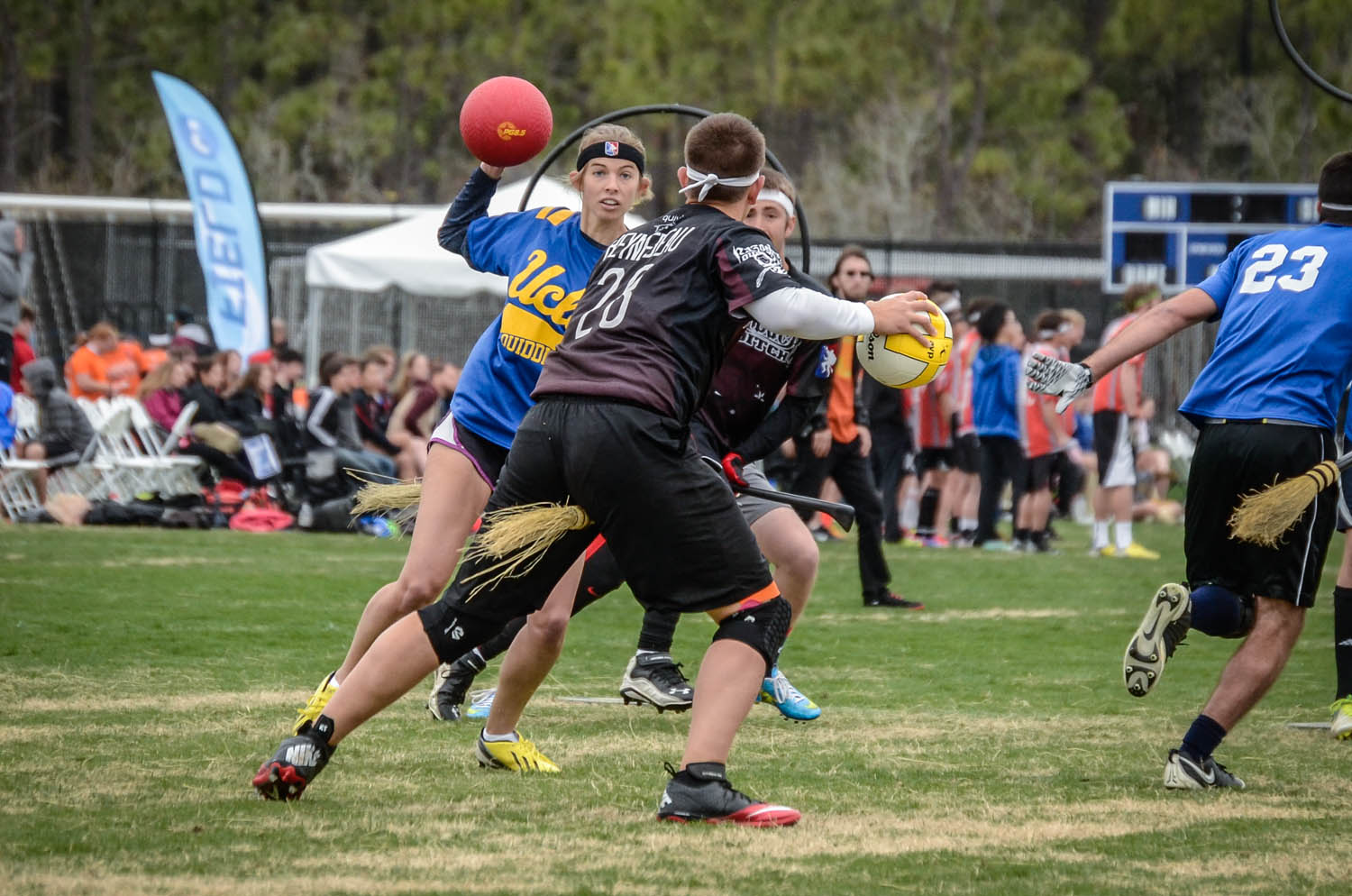
- A chaser tries to advance the quaffle but is deterred by an opposing beater
- First played: 2003 in Orlando, Florida

Characteristics
- Contact: Full
- Team members: 7 on field, 21 total on roster; 1 additional player who is not a member of either team Both teams can substitute players freely at any time behind their proper keeper zone.
- Mixed-sex: Yes
- Type: Team sport, ball sport
- Equipment: Quaffle; Bludgers; Snitch (tennis ball in a cloth bag); Broomsticks (capped PVC pole); Hoops
- Venue: Quidditch pitch (also known simply as a "pitch")

Presence
- Olympic: No
- Paralympic: No

Quidditch is a team sport that was created in 2003 at Nimbus 2003, a Harry Potter convention in Orlando, Florida, United States, and was inspired by the fictional game of the same name in the Harry Potter books by the author J. K. Rowling. Two teams of seven players each, astride broomsticks (or items such as PVC pipes intended to simulate broomsticks) and opposing each other on a rectangular pitch, compete with the primary objective of passing a ball through the defenders' hoops, while preventing their opponents from passing it through their own hoops. The sport is also referred to as "muggle quidditch" to distinguish it from the fictional game of the books, which involves magical elements such as flying broomsticks and enchanted balls—a muggle in the Harry Potter series being a person without magical abilities. The sport is played around the world. Official leagues have adopted the term "Quadball" to avoid copyright issues and have much more stringent rules.

A team usually consists of a minimum of seven (maximum 21) players, of which six are always on the Quidditch pitch: three chasers, one keeper, and two beaters. The seventh position, known as a seeker, joins each team after a time period known as the "seeker floor". The pitch is rectangular, with three hoops (3, 4.5, and 6 feet (91, 137, and 183 cm)) at either end. Teams are required to be gender-balanced: each team may have a maximum of four non-seeker players who identify as the same gender on the field at one time, making quidditch one of the few sports that not only offers a gender-integrated environment, but an open community to those who identify as nonbinary.

To score points, chasers or keepers must get the quaffle—a slightly deflated volleyball—into any of the three opposing hoops, which scores the team 10 points. To impede their opponents, beaters can use bludgers to hit opposing players and temporarily remove them from play. Once hit by an opposing bludger, that player must dismount their broomstick, drop any ball being held, and return to touch their own team's hoops before re-entering the game.

The ultimate goal is to have more points than the other team by the time the snitch—a tennis ball inside a cloth tube hanging from the shorts of an impartial official dressed in yellow—is caught. After twenty minutes of play, the snitch runner moves onto the pitch and tries to evade the two seekers. When one of the seekers catches the snitch, that team is awarded 30 points. If this leads to the catching team having more points overall than their opponents, the game ends immediately with the catching team winning. In the event a team catches the snitch but still trails in points (or is tied for points) the game goes into an overtime period, with the target being the score achieved by the non-catching team plus 30 points. The first team to reach the target score wins the game; alternatively, either team may concede at any time during the overtime period. Matches or games often run about 30 to 40 minutes including stoppages, but tend to vary in length due to the unpredictable nature of the snitch catch.

Variations of quidditch exist, ranging from minor rules changes to fundamentally different game mechanics. The historical rules of quidditch as defined by governing bodies such as USQ and IQA are most similar to the rules currently defining quadball, though there is some geographic variation in those rules as well.

== History ==
Quidditch has its roots in the fictional Harry Potter sport of the same name. To denote the difference, the fictional sport uses the capitalised "Quidditch" whereas the sport played as per the IQA rules uses the uncapitalised "quidditch". In April 2017 Oxford Dictionaries recognised "quidditch" as a word.

The sport was created in 2003 at Nimbus 2003, a Harry Potter convention in Orlando, Florida, by Christopher Dickson, a convention staff member. It grew into its own distinct sport after ten publications of rulebooks.

In 2007, the first Quidditch World Cup took place, won by Middlebury. Starting in 2008 there was a World Cup in the United States, where collegiate and community teams would compete. Canada often sent several Ontario or Quebec teams, and Australia, Mexico and France each sent a team once. In 2012, the IQA hosted the Summer Games, where five nations sent national teams. Two years later, the IQA hosted the Global Games, where the United States defeated Australia for the gold medal. The World Cups, held every two years, are now handled by the Quadball version of the sport.

The sport grew at universities in the United States, extending to Canada at McGill University in 2009 and Carleton University in 2010. In 2010, UCLA became the first major university to create a permanent Quidditch pitch, sponsored by actor Matthew Perry. By 2015, there were teams in Australia, the UK, and France. This was followed by teams in Argentina (with teams such as Demacia's Dragons, Cumulus Nimbus), Italy, Spain, Belgium, the Netherlands, Mexico and Brazil.

=== Establishment of Quadball ===
In December 2021, US Quidditch and Major League Quidditch proposed changing the name of the sanctioned sport, to avoid a potential trademark dispute with Warner Bros and to distance themselves from Rowling and her views on transgender people. Names suggested include "quidball", "quadball", "quickball", "quicker", "quidstrike" and "quadraball". In July 2022, the new name "quadball" was announced, which references the game's four balls and retains 'Q' as the first letter. The International Quidditch Association also adopted the name of "quadball" at this time. As of 2026, there are no officially sanctioned sporting bodies using the term "quidditch".

== Play ==
Quidditch game

Each match typically begins with six of the starting players (excluding the seekers) along the starting line within their keeper zone with brooms on the ground and the four balls lined in the centre of the pitch. The head referee then calls "brooms up!", upon which players run to gain possession of the balls. The snitch runner goes on the field at 17 minutes, and the seekers are released at 18 minutes. Later versions of quidditch rulebooks would incorporate alternate starting procedures where players start from the sideline rather than their keeper zone.

Goals are worth ten points. Once a point is scored, the quaffle must be given to the other team's keeper, and almost immediately returns to the offensive. Games can last any length of time longer than 20 minutes, depending on the skill and endurance of the seekers and snitch runner.

The game may end after the snitch has been caught through what is called a clean catch by the snitch referee, The head referee, and the snitch runner. The team that caught the snitch is awarded 30 points. If the catching Team now has more points than the other, they win and the game ends immediately. If, however, they have fewer points or are tied, the game goes to overtime, with a set score of the non-catching team score plus 30 points. The winner is determined not by the snitch catch, but by the number of points earned throughout the entirety of the game. Depending on the score, teams will delay the snitch catch to better their chances of winning. Teams that are losing tend to defend the snitch by placing themselves between the snitch runner and the opposing seeker.

== Positions ==
The players positions are shown by the colour of the headband they wear on pitch.

- Chasers (white headbands) are responsible for passing the quaffle and scoring points by throwing the quaffle through one of the opponent's goals for 10 points. Chasers may enter into physical contact with opposing chasers or keepers. There are three chasers on the field for each team.
- Keepers (green headband) function as chasers with extra privileges. The keeper is invulnerable to bludgers as well as having indisputable possession of the quaffle when within their team's keeper zone, an area around the team's hoops. There is one keeper per team.
- Beaters (black headband) attempt to hit the opposing team's players with bludgers and attempt to block the bludgers from hitting their team's players. Beaters may catch a bludger to avoid being knocked out. As there are three bludgers for the four beaters on the pitch, the fourth, bludger-less beater puts pressure on the team in control of both bludgers (often called "bludger control" or "bludger supremacy"). If a beater is on a team that has no bludgers, they may raise a hand above their shoulder with their fist closed and claim "bludger immunity" to prevent being knocked out by live bludgers as they collect the third bludger. A team that has two bludgers may not prevent the other team from collecting the third bludger. Beaters may enter into physical contact only with other beaters.
- Seekers (yellow headband) attempt to catch the snitch. They may not forcefully contact the snitch runner but are permitted to contact the other seeker. The snitch runner is released after 19 minutes, giving the seekers a chance to watch the snitch runner before being released 1 minute later, after a total of 20 minutes of game time. There is one seeker on the field for each team.

== Equipment ==
The game is played with six standing hoops, three on each side of a square pitch. Each player must hold a broomstick between their legs. There are three different types of balls in play, and five in total: the quaffle, three bludgers, and the snitch.

=== Broomstick ===
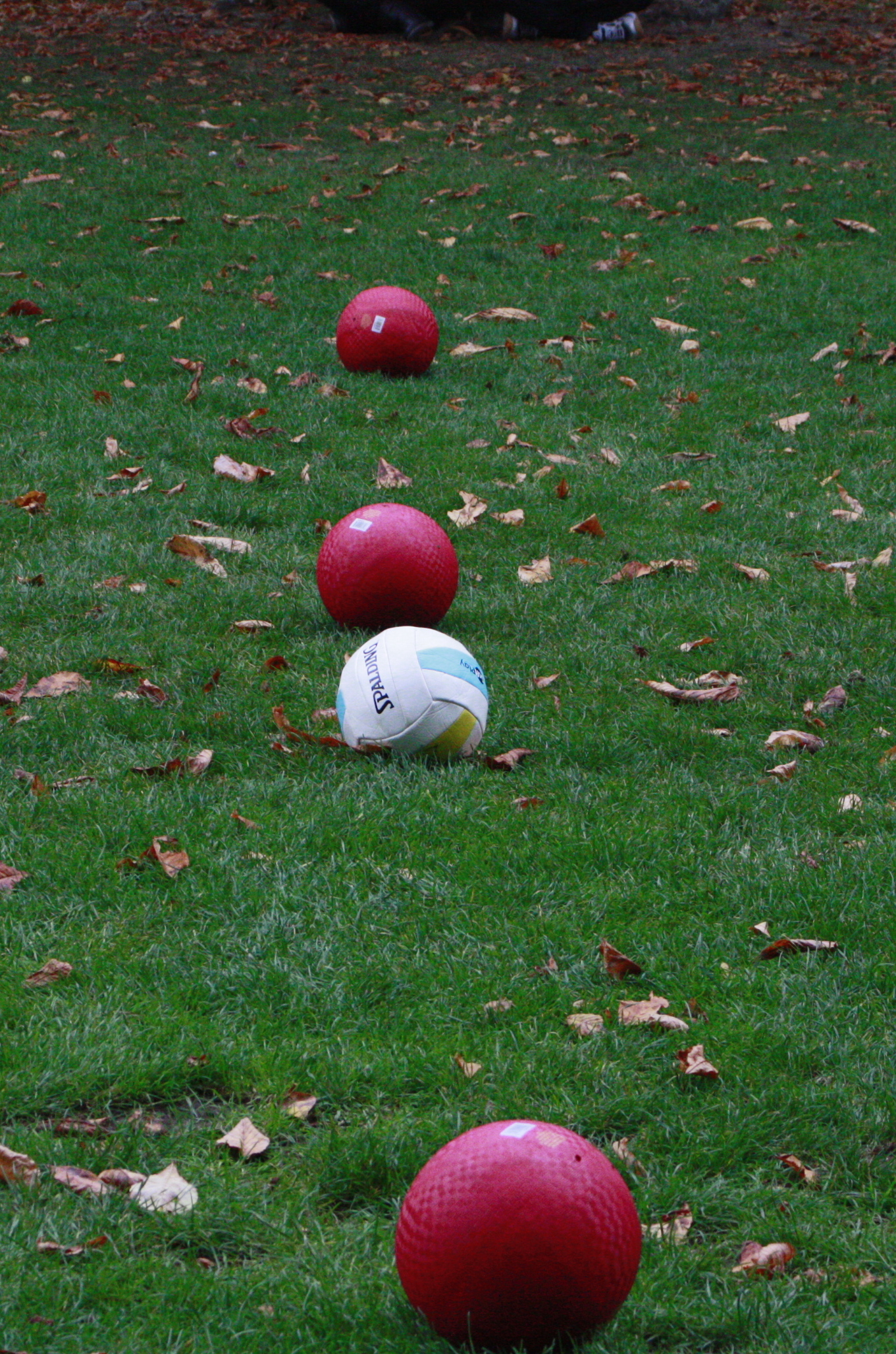
One quaffle and three bludgers lined up for "broomsticks up" before a quidditch match

The broomstick serves the purpose of being a handicap such as one-handed dribbling in basketball or using only one's feet in association football. The player must stay mounted on their broomstick continuously unless they have been hit with a bludger, in which case the player needs to dismount from their broomstick and return to their hoops. To be mounted on the broomstick means that the player must hold the broomstick between their legs and not have it fully on the ground. If a player comes off of their broomstick for any reason, they have to dismount fully and return to their hoops to tag back in and remount.

Players can substitute a variety of objects for broomstick depending on the level of seriousness. Many teams play on PVC pipes of about 3 feet or 1 meter in length; these are usually made, but can also be purchased from specialist suppliers.

=== Hoops ===
Three hoops, each 2.75 ft or 84 cm across, are placed on either side of the pitch on poles of differing heights (3 ft or 0.91 m, 4.5 ft or 1.4 m and 6 ft or 1.8 m), placed 2.75 m or 9.0 ft apart. Chasers and keepers can score by throwing the quaffle through any one of the hoops, from either front or back, gaining ten points for their team per score. Any player experiencing a knock-out effect from either dismounting their broomstick or getting hit with a bludger must touch with any part of their body excluding the broomstick to the pole or loop of any one of their hoops and then remount before returning to play.

=== Quaffle ===
The quaffle is a slightly deflated volleyball and can only be manipulated by chasers or keepers. Used for scoring, it may pass through any hoop from either side. Regardless of which team caused the volleyball to pass through the hoop, as long as it is in play, a goal is scored against the team whose hoop was scored upon, which is counted to be 10 points.

=== Bludgers ===
The bludger is a slightly deflated standard dodgeball, 68 cm or 2.23 ft in circumference, that can only be manipulated by beaters. There are three bludgers. The bludgers are used to hit any other player on the field. Upon being hit by a bludger, a player must dismount their broomstick, drop any ball that they may have been carrying, and touch their team's hoops before resuming play. There also is no friendly fire, meaning that bludgers thrown by beaters cannot affect any of their teammates.

=== Snitch ===
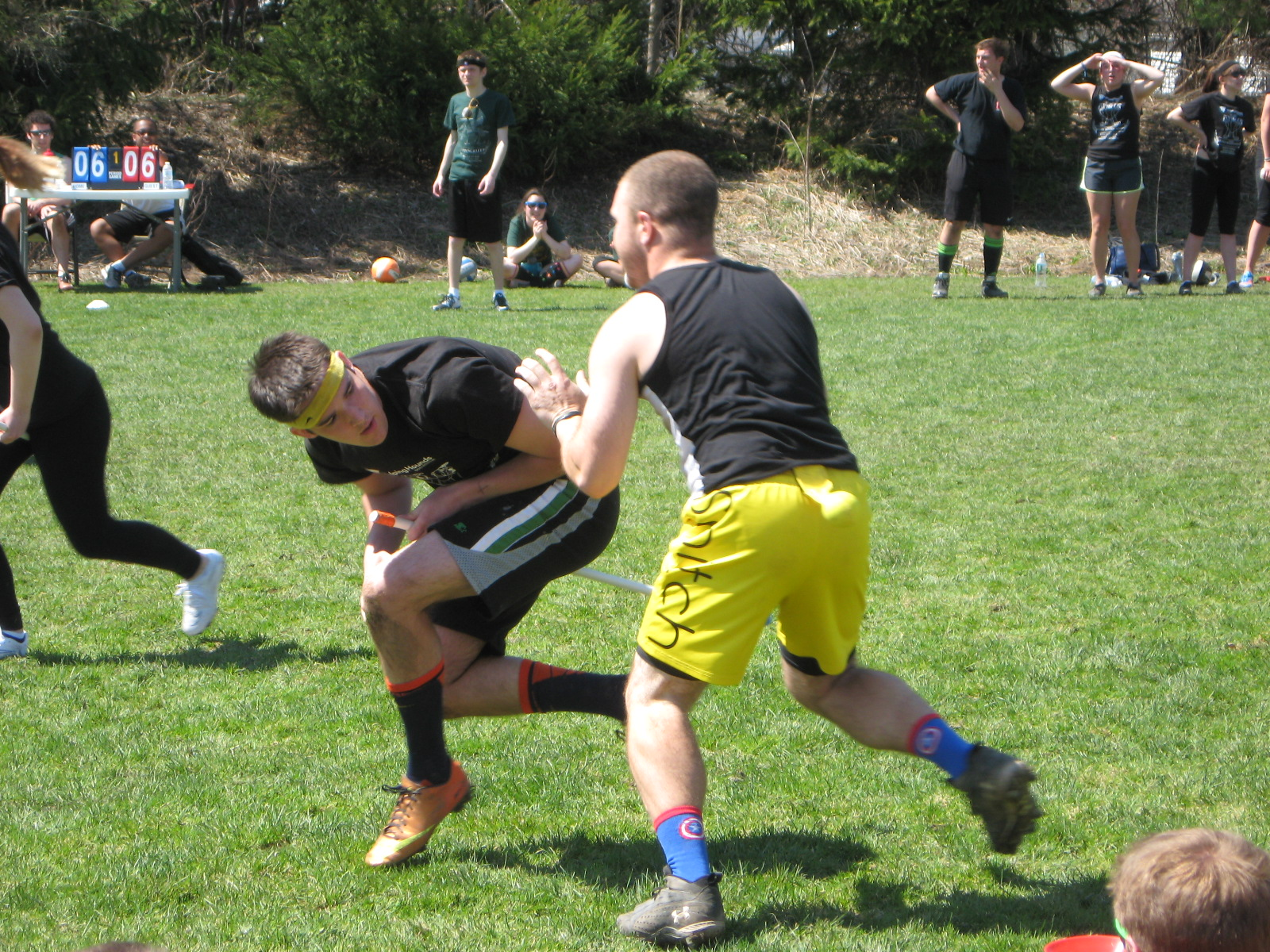
Seeker (l) and Snitch Runner (r) at King's Cup Quidditch Tournament, Syracuse University, April 2015

The snitch is a tennis ball placed at the bottom of a long yellow pouch that is attached to the back of the snitch runner's shorts like in tag rugby. The snitch runner is allowed to be more physical than other players.

Only seekers may make advances towards the snitch or the snitch runner, and no forceful contact with the snitch runner is allowed. If the snitch is not caught within a certain period of time, handicaps for the snitch runner come into play. Catching the snitch awards 30 points.

As of the release of Rulebook 8, the snitch runner is relegated to playing only on the field in the same fashion as the other players. Previously, snitch runners left the pitch to be pursued by seekers returning to the field after a predetermined amount of time.

The snitch runner has the following handicaps imposed on them as the game progresses, to even the field if they are significantly more skilled than either seeker

1. Upon the release of the seekers, the snitch runner is required to remain between the keeper zone lines.
2. 25 minutes into the game, the snitch runner is required to remain within roughly 1.5 meters of the midfield line.
3. 30 minutes into the game, the snitch runner is required to use only one arm.
4. 35 minutes into the game, the snitch runner is required to remain within roughly 1.5 meters of the intersection of the midfield and quaffle runner starting lines.

== Rules ==
USQ (originally IQA) released 15 iterations of the Rulebook prior to adopting the name of Quadball. The modern IQA released 7 iterations of the Rulebook after its split from USQ and prior to the adoption of the name "quadball".

=== Playing ===
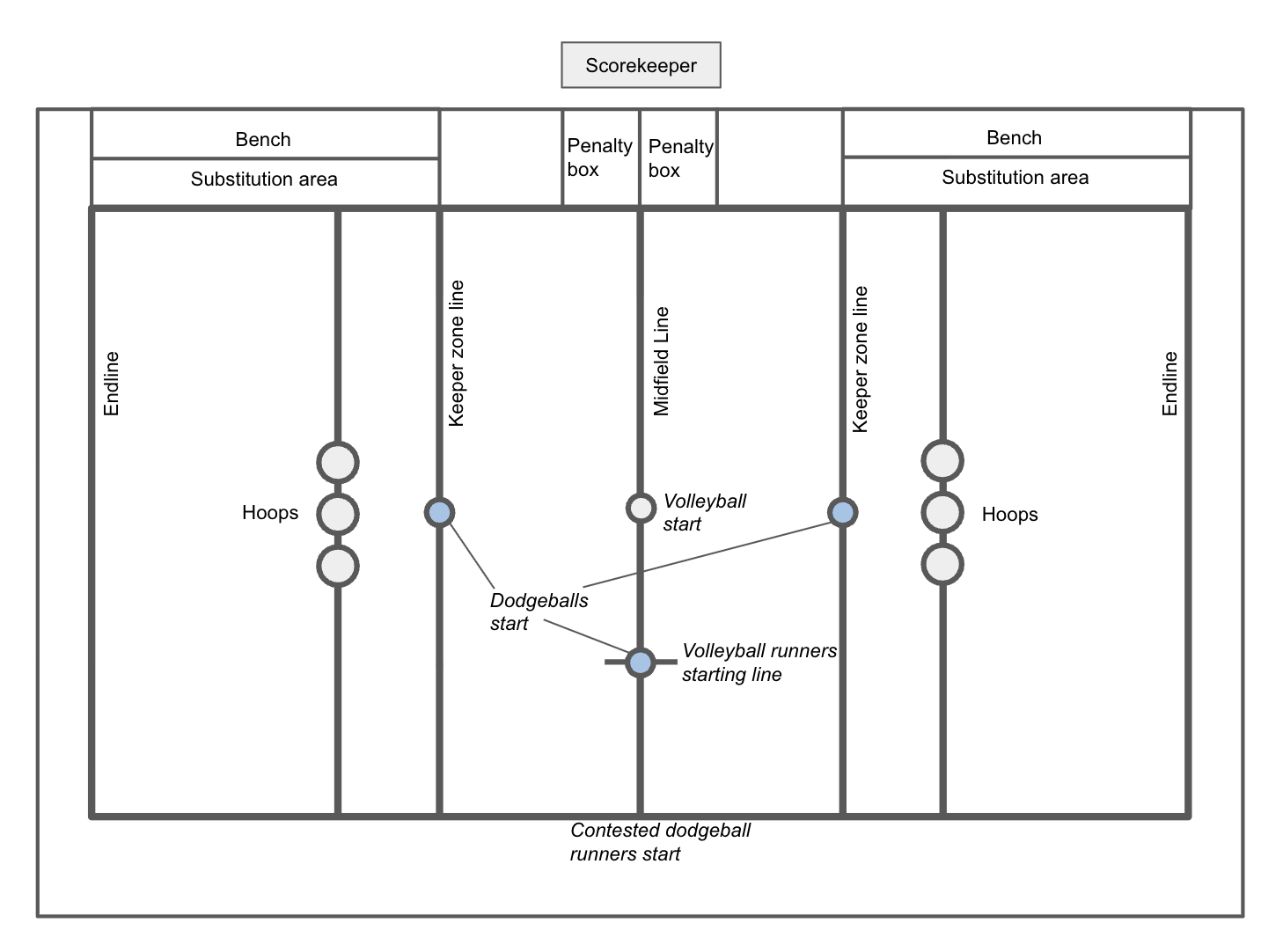

Each match begins with four of the starting players (excluding the seekers) along the starting line within their keeper zone with broomsticks on the ground. One beater from each team has a bludger with them. One chaser and one beater from each team line up at the midline, and the quaffle and the contested bludger are placed 8.25 m or 9.02 yd in front of them. The head referee then calls "brooms up!" at which players run to gain possession of the balls. After brooms up is called, the seekers must not interfere with other positions, and wait near the pitch until the end of the seeker floor, usually 20 minutes. The snitch runner goes on the field at 19 minutes, and the seekers are released at 20 minutes.

Play runs rapidly, with quick change-of-hands of the quaffle, because every goal (each worth 10 points) scored against a team gives that team the ball. Once a point is scored, the quaffle must be given to the other team's keeper, and almost immediately returns to the offensive. Games can last any length of time longer than 20 minutes, depending on the skill and endurance of the seekers and snitch runner. Because of this, there are snitch runner handicaps to ensure games fit within reasonable time slots.

The game is won only after the snitch has been caught cleanly, and the team that caught it is awarded 30 points. The winner is determined not by the snitch catch but by the number of points earned at the time of catch; thus it is not unknown for teams that are losing by a wide margin to try delaying a snitch catch so that they can narrow the opponents' lead, while teams that are up hope to catch rapidly.

=== Fouls and illegal plays ===
Depending on the severity of the foul, a player found committing an illegal play will result in a back-to-hoops, or a blue, yellow, and/or a red card. A back-to-hoops foul means the player must follow the same procedure as when hit with a dodgeball. A blue card or yellow card mean the player must go the penalty box, for either one minute or until the next goal. Blue cards do not stack, but two yellow cards stack to a red card. If a player receives a red card, they are banned from the rest of the match.

If a Keeper is sent to the penalty box, they must give their headband to another chaser on their team, as both teams are required to have a keeper on the pitch at all times.

Contact rules are similar to other contact sports. Tackles are legal between the knees and shoulders. Two-handed tackling is allowed. All tackles must be initiated from the front side of the opposing player. Any back tackles made will result in a yellow card, however, if the player turns their back into the tackle with no chance for adjustment, it is not considered illegal. Players can only tackle other players of their same position (with keepers considered chasers) if they have the ball. Pushes are allowed if the arm is held straight; it is illegal to push if the arm is bent and then extended when pushing another player. Players are not allowed to dive for balls, slide into contact, trip opposing players, or initiate contact around the neck or over the shoulder. If a player is found making any of these offences it will result in a card depending on the severity of the offence.

After several various types of illegal play, after an injury, or after a snitch catch, the head referee will blow their whistle in paired short blasts to indicate stoppage of play, at which point which every player must drop their broomstick where they stand.

The snitch runner can 'take a knee' by having any part of their body except their feet touch the floor. In this case, the seekers cannot advance towards them at all until three seconds after the snitch runner is back up – if they do so, they will be sent back to hoops.

=== Pitch ===
The quidditch pitch is usually marked with cones or with painted lines, and it is where all play occurs (a rectangle of 36 by 66 yards or 33 m × 60 m around the pitch). Balls are not allowed to be kicked off the pitch under penalty, nor is play allowed in the spectator zones. Players are asked to return to the pitch when play moves out of bounds.

On the edge of the pitch is a penalty box where players who have committed fouls that warrant yellow cards are sent for one minute.

== Rules history ==
The rules of quidditch have changed significantly as the sport has developed over time, but most of those are governed by the similar sport of Quadball.

Originally the snitch would be "released" before each match by running off the pitch during a set amount of time, but now the snitch is released to the field, limited to the playing area, at 17 minutes (the seekers being released at 18 minutes). Many chose to continue playing under the old rules. Today, if a chaser or keeper decides to reset the play by throwing the quaffle back to their side of the pitch, there must be a chaser and/or keeper to receive the quaffle. If there is no one to receive the ball, it will be considered a turnover and the offending team will lose possession of the quaffle.

Other items that have changed at the discretion of those playing quidditch include:

- a requirement that once an opposing team has scored, the keeper and or point chaser must keep the ball moving forward at all times.
- moving screens are now illegal. This means that if a person wishes to screen for another player that has the quaffle, the person setting the screen must have their feet planted.
- A change in chaser positioning when restarting play (after third bludger interference and most penalty cards), two yellow cards no longer resulting in a red card, a new setup for the start of games and snitch catches when the catching team ends up behind no longer ending the game.
- The start setup is altered so players no longer line up on their starting line but instead enter the pitch from the side. One bludger starts in the middle of each team's keeper line, whereas the quaffle and third bludger are placed on the midline. One beater and one chaser from each team are chosen as designated runners who line up on the midline. The other players on the team all line up anywhere on the sideline on their half of the pitch, excluding one chaser who acts as the offensive zone chaser and starts on the sideline in the opponents' half.
- In the event a team catches the snitch but this results in them still trailing in points (or being in a tie for points), the game now goes into an overtime period where a target score of the non-catching team's score plus 30 points is set. The first team to reach the target score wins the game, however either team may concede at any time during this overtime period. Catches that result in the catching team leading in points still end the game immediately with the catching team winning.

== Variants ==
There are other variants of real-life Quidditch, notably played in Russia, Kazakhstan, and Hungary amongst other places. These variants often play with rules similar to the fictional sport within the Harry Potter universe but differ wildly from the IQA rules, including: playing without brooms, brooms serving a different purpose, referees throwing balls to act as snitches, differing bludger and beater roles, riding bicycles instead of brooms, etc.

A version of "real life" quidditch is also portrayed in the film The Internship, however it strays wildly from quidditch's ruleset.

=== Corrigan Quidditch ===
While Middlebury College certainly began the sporting craze for quidditch, an independent form of the sport originated in the early spring of 2007 on the campus of the University of North Georgia in Dahlonega, Georgia. This version of the sport uses a Flying Disk as its quaffle, dodge balls as bludgers, and a golden-yellow 'super ball' for the snitch. This form of the game (known affectionately as 'Corrigan Quidditch' after its originator, an English professor at the university who taught a Harry Potter class that term and developed the game for tournament play as an outgrowth of that course) does not call for players to hold a broom between the legs. Additionally, all of the playing apparatus is located within the playing pitch (quaffle, bludgers, snitch, beater's bats, and keeper's brooms). The two brooms are used only to defend the goals, which rise five (1.5), ten (3), and fifteen feet (4.6 m) above the pitch at each end of an elongated octagonal playing field approximately 200 feet (60 m) long. 'Corrigan Quidditch', as does the Middlebury version, has its own official rule book but features whimsical offences including a 'Queensbury'—moving both feet whilst holding the quaffle—and an 'Impermissible'—which allows the offended chaser to run with the quaffle (without incurring a Queensbury offence) and make a 'try' at the goals, defended only by the opposing keeper. Play includes non-participating teams who stand around the pitch and take control of both 'bludgering' players as well as 'sending off' the snitch at irregular intervals during play to allow the seekers (who are kept secret during play) to attempt a game-winning catch. 'Corrigan Quidditch' was the form of play originally covered in the world press during that significant summer when the seventh Harry Potter book (and fifth Harry Potter movie) was released. Unlike the world-popular Middlebury version, 'Corrigan Quidditch' remains a local event still played on its originating campus.

=== Kidditch ===
Modified rules with less contact have been used for younger (school age) players. These rules include no tackling, modified hoops, and some leeway given to referees on the calls they make.

=== Wheelchair Quidditch ===
The Australian Quidditch Association has a set of rules for wheelchair Quidditch.

== In popular culture ==
- Mudbloods is a 2014 quidditch documentary on how quidditch began in the US.
- Fly The Movie: Journey To Frankfurt is a documentary following quidditch players on Team UK as they prepared for the Quidditch World Cup in Germany in 2016.
- The Internship is a 2013 American comedy film which features a game of quidditch played on the Google campus.

== See also ==
- International Quadball Association
- IQA World Cup
- Major League Quadball
