= List of national sports teams of Scotland =

Scotland
- Use: Flag of Scotland

Sports teams of Scotland is an incomplete list of the national sports teams representing Scotland.

== Scottish representative teams ==
=== Multi-sport events ===
- Scotland, the team sent by the Commonwealth Games Council for Scotland to represent the country at the Commonwealth Games

- Scotland at the 2026 Commonwealth Games
- Scotland at the 2022 Commonwealth Games
- Scotland at the 2018 Commonwealth Games
- Scotland at the 2014 Commonwealth Games
- Scotland at the 2010 Commonwealth Games
- Scotland at the 2006 Commonwealth Games
- Scotland at the 2002 Commonwealth Games
- Scotland at the 1998 Commonwealth Games

- Scotland at the 1994 Commonwealth Games
- Scotland at the 1990 Commonwealth Games
- Scotland at the 1986 Commonwealth Games
- Scotland at the 1982 Commonwealth Games
- Scotland at the 1978 Commonwealth Games
- Scotland at the 1974 British Commonwealth Games
- Scotland at the 1970 British Commonwealth Games

- Scotland at the 1966 British Empire and Commonwealth Games
- Scotland at the 1962 British Empire and Commonwealth Games
- Scotland at the 1958 British Empire and Commonwealth Games
- Scotland at the 1954 British Empire and Commonwealth Games
- Scotland at the 1950 British Empire Games
- Scotland at the 1938 British Empire Games
- Scotland at the 1934 British Empire Games
- Scotland at the 1930 British Empire Games

- Scotland, the team sent by the Commonwealth Games Council for Scotland to represent the country at the Commonwealth Youth Games

=== Football ===
- Scotland men's national football team

- Scotland at the 1998 FIFA World Cup
- Scotland at the 1990 FIFA World Cup
- Scotland at the 1986 FIFA World Cup
- Scotland at the 1982 FIFA World Cup
- Scotland at the 1978 FIFA World Cup
- Scotland at the 1974 FIFA World Cup
- Scotland at the 1958 FIFA World Cup
- Scotland at the 1954 FIFA World Cup

- Scotland women's national football team
- Scotland national under-21 football team
- Scotland national under-19 football team
- Scotland B national football team

=== Rugby union ===
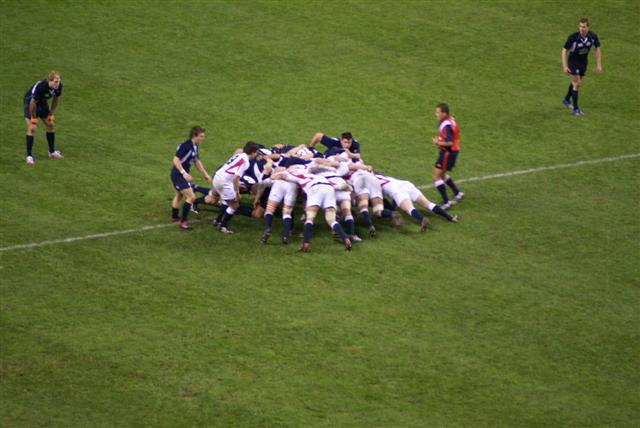

- Scotland national rugby union team
  - Scotland at the Rugby World Cup
- Scotland national rugby sevens team
- Scotland A national rugby union team
- Scotland women's national rugby union team
- Scotland national under-20 rugby union team
- Scotland national under-18 rugby union team
- Scotland national under-16 rugby union team
- Scotland Club XV International rugby union team
- Scotland national rugby sevens team
- Scotland women's national rugby sevens team

=== Australian rules football ===
- Scotland National Australian Rules team

=== Badminton ===
- Scotland national badminton team

=== Baseball ===
- Scotland national baseball team

=== Basketball ===
- Scotland national basketball team
- Scotland men's national under-18 basketball team
- Scotland men's national under-16 basketball team
- Scotland women's national basketball team
- Scotland women's national under-18 basketball team
- Scotland women's national under-16 basketball team

=== Cricket ===
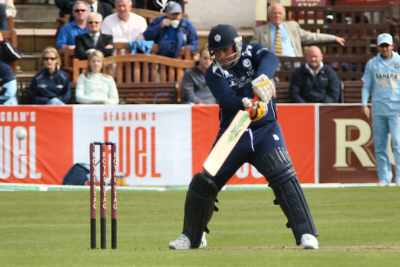

- Scotland national cricket team
- Scotland women's national cricket team
- Scotland national under-19 cricket team

=== Curling ===
Note - curling teams are frequently mixed gender

- Scotland national curling team
- Scotland men's national curling team
- Scotland women's national curling team

=== Cycling ===
- Scotland national cycling team

=== Field hockey ===
- Scotland men's national field hockey team
- Scotland women's national field hockey team

=== Futsal ===
- Scotland national futsal team

=== Ice hockey ===
- Scotland national ice hockey team

=== Kabaddi ===
- Scotland national kabaddi team

=== Korfball ===
- Scotland national korfball team

=== Lacrosse ===
- Scotland national men's lacrosse team
- Scotland national women's lacrosse team
- Scotland national indoor lacrosse team

=== Netball ===
- Scotland national netball team

=== Quadball ===
- Scotland national quadball team

=== Roller derby ===
- Power of Scotland
- Team Scotland Roller Derby

=== Rugby league ===
- Scotland national rugby league team
- Scotland A national rugby league team
- Scotland national wheelchair rugby league team

=== Shinty ===
There is an annual Composite rules Shinty/Hurling, played against Ireland.

- Scotland national shinty team
- Scotland national women's shinty team
- Scotland U21 national shinty team
- Camanachd na h-Alba (Scottish Gaelic Speakers)

=== Squash ===
- Scotland men's national squash team
- Scotland women's national squash team

== See also ==
- List of national sports teams of the United Kingdom
- List of national sports teams of England
- List of national sports teams of Northern Ireland
- List of national sports teams of Wales
- Campaign for a Scottish Olympic Team
- Sport in Scotland
- Membership of the countries of the United Kingdom in international organisations
- Scottish Claymores
- Ecurie Ecosse
