= List of national sports teams of Wales =

Wales

National sports teams of Wales is a list of sports teams representing Wales.

== Multisport events ==
- Wales at the Commonwealth Games

== Single sport events ==
- Badminton
- Wales national badminton team
- Basketball
  - Wales men's national basketball team
  - Wales men's national under-18 basketball team
  - Wales men's national under-16 basketball team
  - Wales women's national basketball team
  - Wales women's national under-18 basketball team
  - Wales women's national under-16 basketball team
- Cricket
  - Wales national cricket team
  - Wales women's national cricket team
- Field hockey
  - Wales men's national field hockey team
  - Wales women's national field hockey team
- Football
  - Wales national football team
  - Wales national under-21 football team
  - Wales national under-20 football team
  - Wales national under-19 football team
  - Wales national under-18 football team
  - Wales national under-17 football team
  - Wales national semi-professional football team
  - Wales women's national football team
  - Wales women's national under-19 football team
  - Wales women's national under-17 football team
  - Wales national futsal team
- Ice hockey
  - Wales women's national ice hockey team
- Korfball
  - Wales national korfball team
- Netball
  - Wales national netball team
- Rugby League
  - Wales national rugby league team
  - Wales women's national rugby league team
  - Wales national wheelchair rugby league team
- Rugby union
  - Wales national rugby union team
  - Wales national under-20 rugby union team
  - Wales A national rugby union team
  - Wales national rugby sevens team
  - Wales women's national rugby union team
  - Wales women's national rugby sevens team
- Quadball
  - Welsh National Quadball Team (Quadball Cymru)
- Squash
  - Wales men's national squash team
- Volleyball
  - Wales men's national volleyball team

== See also ==
- Sport in Wales
- Membership of the countries of the United Kingdom in international organisations
- List of national sports teams of the United Kingdom
- List of national sports teams of England
- List of national sports teams of Northern Ireland
- List of national sports teams of Scotland
