= Lorgnette =

Pair of spectacles with a handle

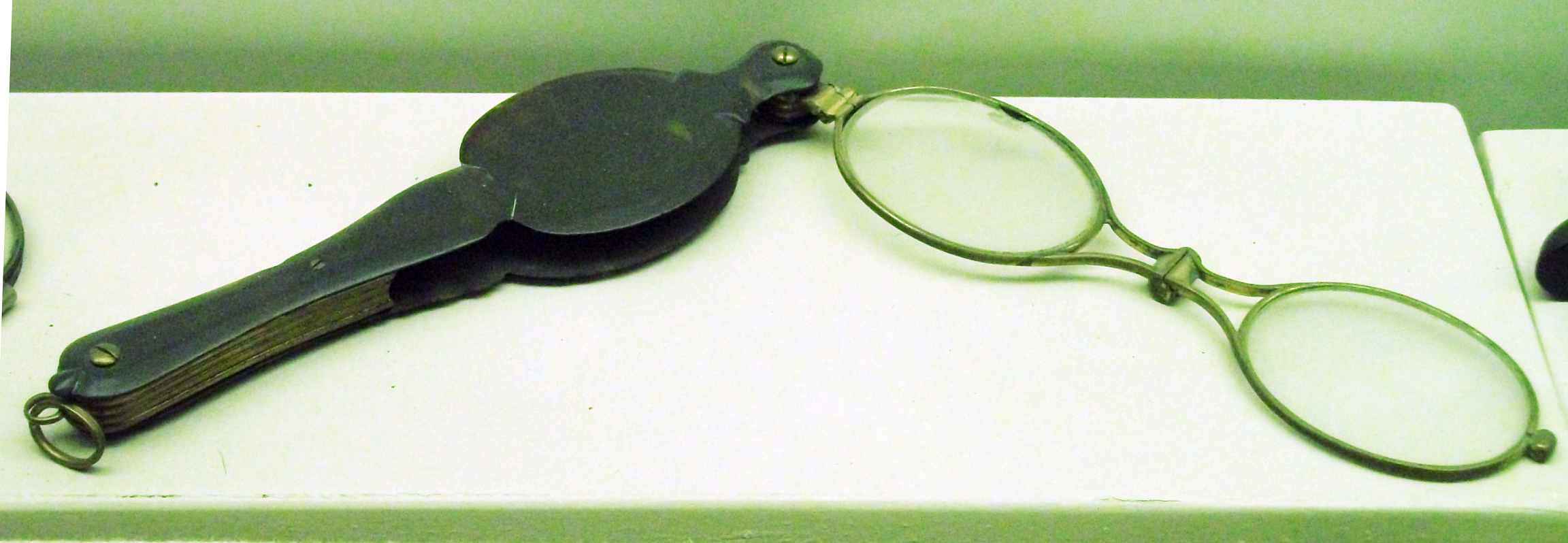
Folding set of Lorgnette spectacles, Bedford Museum, Bedford

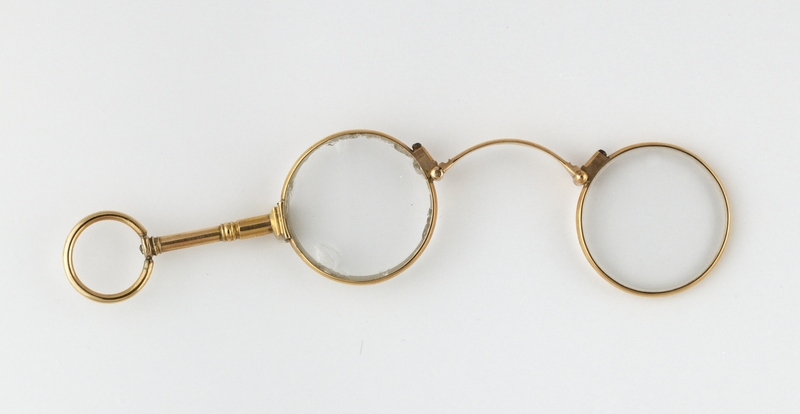
Lorgnette used by David Scott Mitchell

A lorgnette (/lɔːˈnjɛt/) is a pair of spectacles with a handle, used to hold them in place, rather than fitting over the ears or nose. The word lorgnette is derived from the French lorgner, to take a sidelong look at, and Middle French, from lorgne, squinting. Their precise origin is debated: some sources describe English scientist George Adams the Elder as their inventor, while others cite his son George Adams the Younger.

The lorgnette was usually used as a piece of jewelry, rather than to enhance vision. Fashionable ladies usually preferred them to spectacles. These were very popular at masquerade parties and used often at the opera. They were worn popularly in the 19th century. The lorgnette was employed as a prop and affectation by early 20th century trial lawyer Earl Rogers, and one is featured on the front cover dust jacket of his biography, Final Verdict, by his daughter Adela Rogers St. Johns.

== Etymology ==
This word comes from French lorgnette, from lorgner (to take a sidelong look at), but it is a false friend: the equivalent French name for this (obsolete) optical instrument is face-à-main while lorgnette (or lunette d'approche, longue-vue) usually means a ship captain's (monocular) telescope.

== Description and types ==
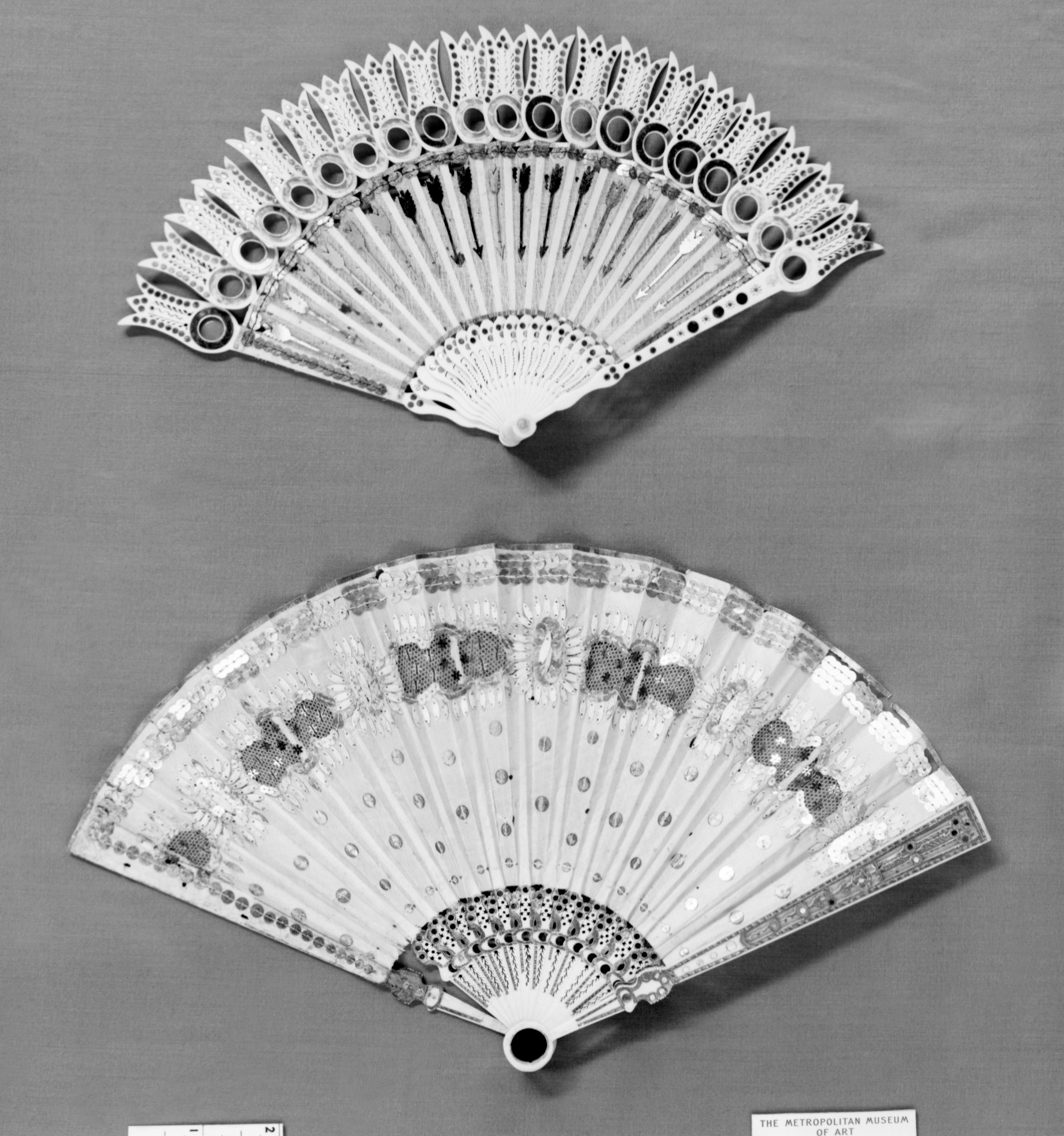
Fan lorgnette from late 18th century

There are many types and forms of the lorgnette. The standard lorgnettes is a pair of spectacles on the end of a handle. The fan lorgnette and the double lorgnette are two variations of the lorgnette.

Lorgnettes were made from a range of different materials including tortoise shell, horn, silver, gold, enamel, and various kinds of jewels. The handle length varies, and may incorporate various decorative or functional designs, such as a protective case for the lenses to fold into.

In the fan lorgnette, the lorgnette is hidden in the fan and used to inconspicuously observe others. An unusual variant of the fan lorgnette is the French/Spanish "Flirtation Fan" or "Eventail Cocarde" which has a unique use of mirrors and methods of opening and closing.

A double lorgnette (also known as dual purpose lorgnette) consists of two pairs of spectacle lenses of different power, typically one for far-sighted vision and one for near-sighted vision.

== History ==
From its invention to around the 17th century, corrective eyeglasses were mainly for the use of men. It was not common practice for women to use optical aids unless they were to partake in specific activities or tasks in which they were required to use them such as sewing or reading. Women wearing spectacles in public was also not considered attractive.

Following the introduction and popularisation of the lorgnette, women became more involved with the use of optical aids. The lorgnette enabled women to view their surroundings clearly, but it was also used for social and decorative purposes. A large portion of the social life of European ladies involved the observation of the people around them, especially the attendance of others at events such as opera or theatre. The lorgnette was part of the elegant games of high society. The use of lorgnettes allowed women of high society to easily scrutinise objects of interest without directly facing their subject.

The exact specificities of the time, people involved and nature of the invention of the lorgnette is debatable. Some sources credit English scientist George Adams the Elder with their invention around 1770. Others cite his son George Adams the Younger as their inventor around 1780, although he himself credits his father with their invention in his 1789 book An Essay on Vision. In this work, the lorgnette was described as "a kind of substitute for spectacles. Both eyes are used at once, without any effort", and was accompanied with an illustration. It is also mentioned that the lorgnette was contrived to allow for more convenience and ease in looking at any occasional object.

Early versions of the lorgnette were focused on the practicality and functionality of the spectacles to the user due to their round rims and heavier, undecorated designs. However, over time, the lorgnette began to serve as more of a decorative accessory, especially for women attending opera or theatre.

== Fashion and popular culture ==
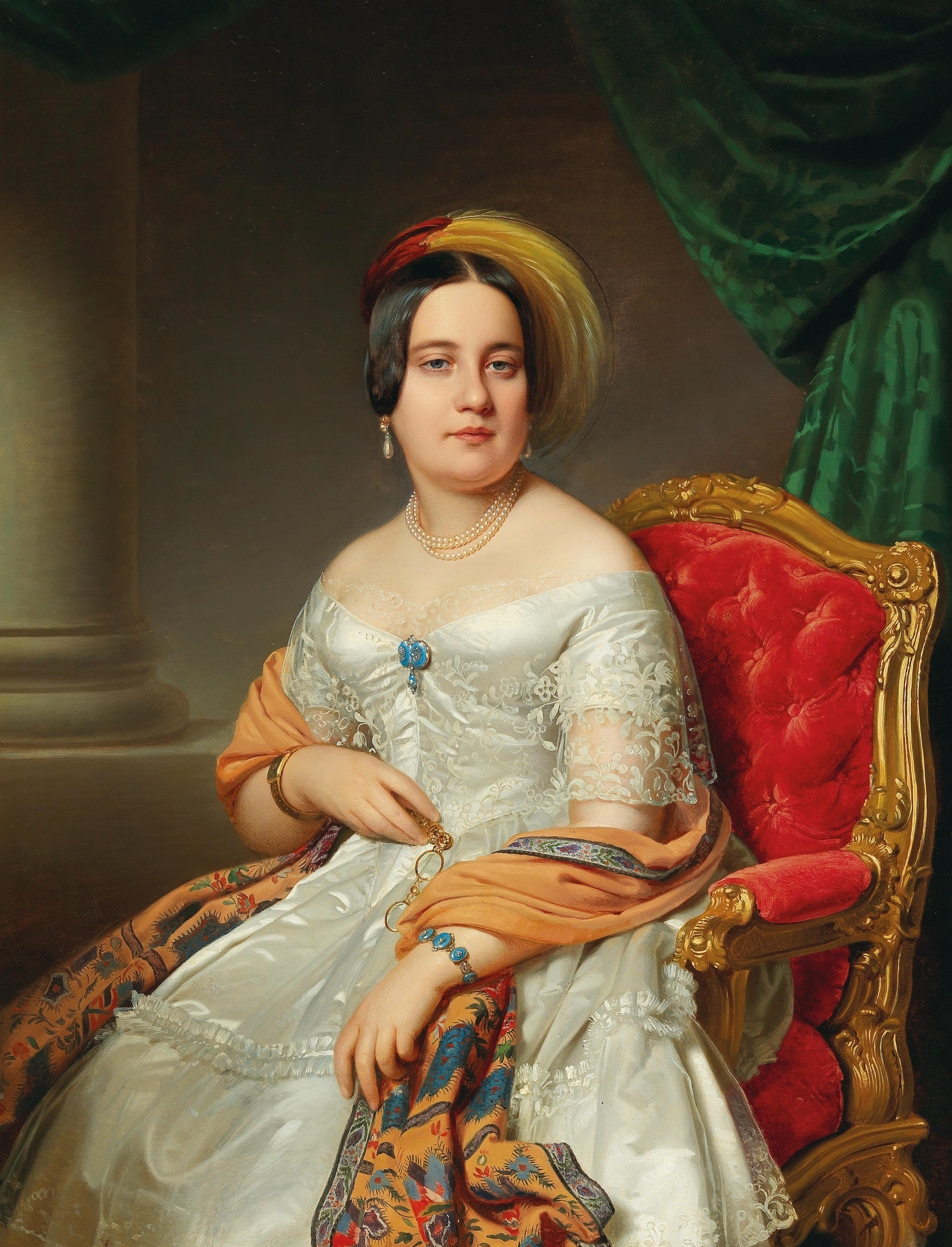
Portrait of Louise von Wertheimstein holding a lorgnette

The lorgnette was presented as a necessity for English women who suffered from short-sightedness as well as a fashionable accessory. It was thought of as an attractive alternative to conventional glasses or spectacles, as these were considered unbecoming for women to wear in public. Over time, lorgnettes came to be used as decoration rather than for practical purposes.

Lorgnettes were valued for features such as how they could easily be carried around at one's own discretion and how they could be quickly taken out and lifted into place on the face to swiftly observe or find answers to questions with grace. Lorgnettes were considered to be a great addition to outfits. This was especially so for women preparing their attire to go to the theatre or opera. As a vision aid and fashion statement, it was an accessory that allowed fashionable and vision impaired women to clearly see the action on the stage with ease and to partake in the games of high society.

The Duchess of Windsor is said to have owned a collection of lorgnettes and thereby to have brought the lorgnette back to fashion in the 1950s. She is described to have been especially fond of a particular lorgnette that "springs out from a small tiger handle of gold, striped in black enamel, emerald-eyed", designed by Cartier in Paris.

Leonora Corbett, an English actress, is said to have owned a "diamond set lorgnette that opens when she presses the second diamond from the top of its twisted golden handle" designed by Sterlé of Paris.

In the oil on canvas portrait of Louise von Wertheimstein (Vienna 1813–1890), born Biedermann, she is seen to be holding a lorgnette in her right hand as she poses for her painting.

Donald Grant Mitchell wrote a series of satirical pamphlets titled The Lorgnette, or Studies of the Town in New York City published by bookseller Henry Kernot in the 1850s.

== See also ==
- Monocle
- Musée des Lunettes et Lorgnettes Pierre Marly
- Pince-nez
- Opera glasses
