= England women =

England women may refer to:

- Women in England

== National sports teams ==
- England women's national basketball team
- England women's cricket team
- England women's national field hockey team
- England women's national football team
- England women's national ice hockey team
- England women's national lacrosse team
- England women's national rugby league team
- England women's national rugby union team
- England women's national squash team
- England women's national volleyball team
