= Wales national team =

Wales national team, Welsh national team, Team Wales and similar names refer to teams representing Wales in international competition, including:

== Basketball ==
- Wales men's national basketball team
- Wales men's national under-16 basketball team
- Wales men's national under-18 basketball team
- Wales women's national basketball team

== Cricket ==
- England and Wales cricket team
- England and Wales women's cricket team
- Wales national cricket team
- Wales National County Cricket Club
- Wales women's national cricket team

== Football ==
- Wales national football team
- Wales national semi-professional football team
- Wales national under-17 football team
- Wales national under-18 football team
- Wales national under-19 football team
- Wales national under-21 football team
- Wales women's national football team
- Wales women's national under-17 football team
- Wales women's national under-19 football team

== Rugby ==
- Wales national rugby league team
  - Wales A national rugby league team
- Wales national rugby sevens team
- Wales national rugby union team
  - Wales A national rugby union team
- Wales national under-20 rugby union team
- Wales national wheelchair rugby league team
- Wales women's national rugby sevens team
- Wales women's national rugby league team
- Wales women's national rugby union team

== Other sports ==
- Wales at the Commonwealth Games
- Wales men's national field hockey team
- Wales men's national lacrosse team
- Wales men's national squash team
- Wales national badminton team
- Wales national futsal team
- Wales national korfball team
- Wales national netball team
- Wales women's national field hockey team
- Wales women's national ice hockey team
- Wales women's national lacrosse team

== See also ==
- Sport in Wales
- Sport Wales - the national organisation responsible for developing and promoting sport and physical activity in Wales.
- Team GB
- List of national sports teams of the United Kingdom
