= England national hockey team =

England national hockey team may refer to:

- England national bandy team
- England women's national bandy team
- England men's national field hockey team
- England women's national field hockey team
- England men's national ice hockey team (defunct)
- England women's national ice hockey team (defunct)
- England national roller hockey team
