= England national shinty team =

Shinty team

England
- Union: English Shinty Association
- Ground: No fixed ground
- Captain: Matt Mossop
- Top scorer: Matt Casey
Team kit	Change kit

Largest win
- England 8–0 USA (United States) , 3 May 2014

Largest defeat
- (Scotland) Strachur and District Shinty Club 21-0 England 5 May 2018

The English Shinty Team is the team selected to represent The English Shinty Association and the sport of shinty in England. It has competed at International level against the United States and Alba, and also competes in Scottish cup competitions at club level.

== History ==
The English Shinty Team was formed along with the English Shinty Association in 2013 to represent the association in fixtures.

They took on the USA in what was dubbed as the first ever Shinty International at St Andrews in 2013, winning 2–0.

Since then, The English Shinty Team have entered the Bullough Cup annually and played friendly matches when possible as noted below. To celebrate their 10th Anniversary and Tayforths 40th Anniversary, 20 May 2023 saw ESA's historic first "senior" home match v Tayforth in the second round of the Bullough Cup played at Greenford in London, preserving ESA's then unbeaten home record with a 1-0 win for ESA. ESA had been drawn at home just once before (though having to play in Scotland), beating Ballachuillish 4-2 at St Andrews in 2019 in their only other win at that point. 2024 saw ESA Women fail to progress on penalties in the WCA Challenge Cup first round and the "seniors" losing their 2 game 11 year "home" unbeaten run again the Bullough Cup eventual winners Lochside 8-1. A first shinty-hurling club international with European Champions Paris GAA saw ESA well beaten by the European Champions on St Andrews Day in Greenford, London. 2025 saw 3 ESA 6s teams (Cornwall, Durham and ESA) enter the largest ever (36 teams) Jack Asher 6s tournament in Glasgow in January, with ESA progressing to the semi-finals. ESA enter the Chieftain's Cup for the first time as well as the Bullough and WCA Challenge Cups. Whilst the women narrowly lost out in the first round of the WCA Cup, the "Seniors" won both first round "home" ties against Tayforth- with a 3-1 win played at Peterson Park, Glasgow 12/4/2025 in the Chieftains Cup and a tight 1-0 win played at St Andrews 20/4/2025 in the 1st Round of the Bullough Cup. Ballachuillish proved too much in the second round of the Chieftains, but a 7-1 win over Stirling Camanchdh- at "home" at Peterson Park May 24th, set-up another "home" clash with Lochside in the semi-final of the Bullough, where Lochside came away 7-2 winners.

== Eligibility criteria ==
Players are generally considered eligible to play for the ESA team if they are registered with one of the shinty clubs based in England and not playing with any other club at the time. Most of the players are permanently resident in England, but there have been cases of players who have a historical link with England (often by birth or long residency in the country) and are not registered with another club registering and joining the team for matches.

== Matches ==
Date	Competition	Match	Result	Captain	Scorers
20 April 2013	International Challenge	ESA vs USA	2–0	Graham Love	Alan MacDonald x2
18 May 2013	Bullough Cup	Tayforth vs ESA	11-1	Graham Love	Alan MacDonald
3 May 2014	International Challenge	ESA vs USA	8-0	Graham Love	Matthew Casey x5 Alan MacDonald Matt Mossop
31 May 2014	Bullough Cup	Ballachulish Camanachd Club 2nd team vs ESA	2-0	John Kewley	
26 July 2014	Bullough Plate	Aberdour vs ESA	2-0	John Kewley	
2015	Bullough Cup	Kyles Athletic 2nd team vs ESA	16-0	Matt Mossop (acting)	
11 June 2016	Bullough Cup	Glasgow Mid Argyll 2nd team vs ESA	6-1	John Kewley	Matt Mossop
2017	Bullough Cup	Kyles Athletic 2nd team vs ESA	7-0	Luke Sparrow	
5 May 2018	Friendly	Aberdour 2nd team vs ESA	4-4	James Hoppy	Mossop x2, Matthew Young, Craig Holt
16 June 2018	Bullough Cup	Strachur and District Shinty Club vs ESA	21-0	James Hoppy	
28 July 2018	International series match	Alba (shinty team) vs ESA	11-1	Matt Mossop	Matt Mossop
6 October 2018	Friendly	ESA vs Celts	3-1	Matt Mossop	
19 April 2019	Friendly	Uddingston vs ESA	1-6	James Livingstone	James Livingstone x2, Daniel Hopkins, Chris Holley x2, Rory Soane
20 April 2019	Friendly	St Andrews Uni vs ESA	2-12	Matt Mossop	Rory Soane x7, Matt Mossop x3, Daniel Hopkins, Chris Holley
21 April 2019	International Challenge	Scottish Universities Select vs England	10-7	Matt Mossop	Rory Soane x3, Matt Mossop x2, Daniel Hopkins, Chris Holley
4 May 2019	Bullough Cup	ESA vs Ballachulish Camanachd Club 2nd team	4-2	Matt Mossop	Christopher Holley x2, James Livingstone x2
15 June 2019	Bullough Cup (2nd round)	Lochside Rovers vs ESA	6-2	Matt Mossop	James Livingstone, Christopher Holley
22 February 2020	Friendly	Tayforth vs ESA	5-1	Matt Mossop	Christopher Holley
20 June 2021	Bullough Cup	Kilmory Camanachd vs ESA	5-0	David Mclean	
30 April 2022	Bullough Cup	Kilmory Camanachd vs ESA	5-0	Barra de Burca	
7 April 2023	10th Anniversary Tour	Edinburgh Uni (Mixed) vs ESA (Mixed)	1-2	Barra de Burca	Barra De Burka, Luke Wilkinson
8 April 2023	10th Anniversary Tour	Kingdom of Fife (Mixed) vs England (Mixed)	4-0	Barra de Burca	
9 April 2023	International Challenge	Scottish Universities (Mixed) vs England (Mixed)	2-6	Barra de Burca	Alex Amos, Cammy Purdy x2, Neil Sutherland, Tom Abbott, Eosaph Caimbeul (Pen)
20 May 2023	Bullough Cup 1/4 Final	ESA vs Tayforth	1-0	Matt Mossop	Matt Mossop
8 July 2023	Bullough Cup Semi-Final	Kyles Athletic 2s vs ESA	6-1	Barra de Burca	James Livingstone
16 Sept 2023	International series match	Alba (shinty team) vs England	15-1	Jamie Cranston	Jamie Cranston

== In popular culture ==
The song "When you hear the lions' roar" is an ode to the English Shinty Team and makes reference to the dying out of shinty in England and its replacement with hockey. It also makes reference to England's history and the difficulty some Scottish players have playing for the team.

== See also ==
List of national sports teams of England
