= English Shinty Association =

The English Shinty Association
- Comann Camanachd Shasainn (Scottish Gaelic)
- Abbreviation: ESA
- Formation: 2013
- Founders: Matt Mossop; Graham Love; Alan MacDonald
- Type: Sports Association
- Members: Shinty clubs based in England and Wales
- Chairperson: Craig Holt
- Treasurer: Cameron Purdy
- Secretary: Jamie Cranston
- Parent organization: Camanachd Association https://shinty.com/english-shinty-association/
- Website: https://www.facebook.com/englishshintyassociation

The English Shinty Association (ESA) is the main body for promoting and developing the sport of shinty in England and Wales. ESA has 6 associated clubs (Bristol, Cornwall, Durham, London, Manchester and Oxford) and is the governing body for the English Shinty League (ESL) and the South West Shinty League (SWSL).

== History of shinty in England ==
Shinty was previously played widely in England in the 19th century and early 20th century, with teams such as London Scots, Bolton Caledonian, Cottonopolis and evidence to suggest it was played in some form in Cumberland, Yorkshire, Lancashire, Cheshire, Nottingham, and Lincoln. Nottingham Forest F.C. was established by shinty and bandy players as Nottingham Forest Football and Bandy Club. Football stadiums including Old Trafford and Stamford Bridge were early venues for Shinty in England.

=== Shinty in London ===
Stamford Bridge the home of Chelsea F.C. started out as the London shinty teams playing ground. The blue tops of London Camanachd were given to the Chelsea football team to use as shinty was at the time more popular and just better funded. Football and shinty used the same grounds for many years in the 19th century. Still to this day both London Camanachd and Chelsea F.C. wear the same blue as their home colours as a throwback to their shared history.

Shinty has had an up and down history in England. With the number of Scots always changing depending on the economy of the times. Shinty in London remained strong in the 20th century where it had been reported that there was once eight teams.

London had the Dewar's shield (donated by the Dewar's whisky distillery) this was a very popular tournament with games played weekly in London. With the breakout of WW2 all silverware was put in a central location vault in London and was unfortunately bombed in the blitz. This bit of history was lost. The Dewar's shield league never took off after this point. In 2020 records about what it once was had been re-discovered in old newspapers and the plan to reform this league had started again.

=== English Shinty in the 1960s-1980s ===
There was a Northallerton Camanachd in the late 60s to early 80s, and interest was maintained by the links to the nearby military base, but they only competed periodically. London Camanachd and Oxford in the 80s were the only teams left. London went to yellow strips given to them by Brian boru GAA team in London. At this time 6s was the popular thing in shinty and with this being easier to form teams then the 12s shinty remained. Having to borrow from others was very much needed and London Camanachd even had to ask the shinty teams in Oxford for funding just to keep them going.

=== 2000s ===
Shinty had been holding on even if in its very small form in England and only London Camanachd was left into the 21st century. In 2005 shinty in England had all but stopped and all teams had no longer able to field a team on their own. The only team left at this point was London Camanachd. The teams all around England and Wales that had folded leaving some players just having a hit about by themselves in parks from time to time. Players remained on the ‘if and when list’ whenever London could get a game. One of the last games was in 2006 London Camanachd who were made up of people from all over England and Wales who would come together to form the London team on the terms of who ever came on the day got to play.

One of the last games London played was to the Highlanders (the army shinty team) in the Bullough cup. This was the first game in almost 80 years at that time where a Scottish league game had been played outside of Scotland. In the years that followed the numbers would get smaller until 2009 where the London team only went down to a few people who would occasionally hit a ball in the park and whenever possible attempt to enter a 6s tournament. But this eventually stopped.

=== 2010s ===
In 2011 there was effort to restart London Camanachd. With the advent of social media this meant a bigger audience was able to be reached. The revival of the London Club had sparked interest in Cornwall. With word getting around and numbers small in Cornwall they were finally able to offer London some 'local' opposition in March 2012.

London's success grew and the English Capital's side hosted a successful tournament in September 2012 featuring the hosts, Cornwall and the SCOTS Camanachd.[3] (the army team's new name) The influence of the SCOTS and the tradition of English shinty being run by Scottish university graduates saw the resurrection of shinty in Northallerton under the name Northallerton Shinty Club. Many attempts were then put together to try and get this Northern team going but it never took off.

As this point the focus was getting a stable team that could be reintroduced to Scotland to take part in the Bullough cup. The English Shinty Association was then formed and with London and Cornwall who could both offer players who could travel to Scotland the hope was that blending the players would be easier than just relying on a single team to found for all the numbers. In 2013, the English Shinty Association played its first game in Scotland. ESA v Tayforth. ESA lost this game but at the time had not realised the fire that had been started in England when it came to shinty and in the coming years the teams that would be formed as a result of this effort made.

Atkins UK donated Helmets to the association to help provide protection, especially to the youth players, at club and international level.

== ESA Formation ==
The English Shinty Association was founded in 2013 by three ex-University Shinty players with a passion for reviving the game in England. The three players in question, Matt Mossop, Graham Love and Alan MacDonald, had already founded/revived teams in their respective areas, Cornwall, London and Northallerton.

With London crowned English Champions at the Shinty Shop Challenge Cup on goal difference over Cornwall at Bristol's expense, ESA organized the historic first shinty international against the US in 2013 (England 2- USA 0), ESA entered the Bullough Cup for the first time in 2013, whilst its constituent teams were represented at St Andrews Sixes in 2013.

Expansion continued in 2014, entering the Bullough Cup, running a tour to Scotland and various festivals being run in London, Cornwall and other locations in England.

== Structure ==
The association currently supports five clubs: Bristol Camanachd, Cornwall Shinty Club, Oxford Shinty Club, Devon Shinty Club, and the oldest shinty club in England, London Camanachd.

The distribution of these teams on a map leads to these teams being commonly referred to as belonging to “the English shinty belt”. The distance between London Camanachd and Cornwall Shinty Club is almost the same as that between London and Scotland. It's often remarked that the two most widely separated teams in Scotland have less distance to travel getting to each other than London and Cornwall do, yet year after year the teams in England are doing just that.

The committee was expanded in 2014 to facilitate the development of Women's and University Shinty as well as overseeing the day-to-day running of the association.

The English Shinty Association is an affiliated member of the Camanachd Association, the world's governing body for shinty.

With the expansion of shinty in England teams that are relatively close to each other have formed their own breakaway leagues of 6s, with Cornwall, Bristol and Devon taking part in the South West League. Within these teams there had been a number of university teams and the southwest league gives them the chance to take part on a lower level to showcase skill before being able to be selected for county level.

London and Oxford are reforming the Dewars Shield, giving London Camanachd the ability to split their team down to a number of smaller teams for a similar 6s setup, as with the South West League.

== Clubs and teams ==
The association has a varied range of teams under its auspices.

- English Shinty Team, which competes in Scottish cup competitions.

There are five major clubs in England who are affiliated as separate members of the Camanachd Association.

- London Camanachd, the oldest team in England, which have a long history of competition in Scottish cup competitions.
- Cornwall Shinty Club.
- Oxford Shinty Club.
- Durham Shinty Club.
- Bristol Shinty Club.

== Competitions ==
The association runs the English Shinty League and the English Shinty Championship, played for the Shinty Shop Challenge Cup. This was first played in 2012 in Flax Bourton. 2013 was played in Bristol.

=== English Shinty League (ESL) Winners ===
- 2024 Cornwall
- 2023 Cornwall
- 2022 Cornwall and London
- 2021 London
- 2020 Not held (Due to disruption caused by COVID-19 pandemic)
- 2019 London

=== English Shinty League Tables ===
2021 English Shinty League Table
Team	Games Played	Won	Drawn	Lost	Points
London	4	4	0	0	8
Oxford	4	2	1	0	5
Cornwall	3	2	0	1	4
Bristol	4	1	1	2	3
Devon	3	0	0	3	0

2019 English Shinty League Table
Team	Games Played	Won	Drawn	Lost	Points
London	8	6	1	1	19
Cornwall	8	6	0	2	18
English Development	8	4	1	3	13
Oxford	8	3	0	5	9
Devon	8	0	0	8	0

=== English Championship Winners ===
- 2021 Not held (Due to disruption caused by COVID-19 pandemic)
- 2020 Not held (Due to disruption caused by COVID-19 pandemic)
- 2019 London
- 2018 London
- 2017 Cornwall
- 2016 Cornwall
- 2015 Cornwall
- 2014 London
- 2013 London
- 2012 Title Shared - London & Cornwall

== International Activities ==
For more information see English Shinty Team

Year	ESA/England	Opposition	Result (Winner)	Competition	Location
2024	ESA	Paris Gaels	Paris 7-14 ESA 1-01 (Paris Gaels)	Shinty-Hurling International	Tir Chonaill Gaels, Greenford, London
2023	England	Alba	(Alba)	English Camanachd Cup	Blairbeg Park, Drumnadrochit, Highland
2023	ESA	Scottish Student Sport (SSS) University Select	6-2 (ESA)	Friendly	Peffermill Playing Fields, Edinburgh
2018	England	Alba	11-1 (Alba)	English Camanachd Cup	The Dell, Kingussie
	England	USA	2-0 (Eng)	International Challenge Match	
2013	ESA	Tayforth Camanachd	11-1 (Tayforth)	Bullough Cup	Peffermill Playing Fields, Edinburgh
