= Scotland women's national ice hockey team =

Scotland
- Association: Scottish Ice Hockey

First international
- England 1–1 Scotland (Edinburgh, Scotland; December 28, 1991)

Biggest defeat
- England 7–0 Scotland (Sheffield, England; January 30, 1993); Wales 7-0 Scotland (Paisley, Scotland; April 10, 2004)

International record (W–L–T)
- 0-3-1

The Scotland women's national ice hockey team represents Scotland in international ice hockey competitions. Since 1991, the team has participated in four friendlies.

== All-time record against other nations ==
Team	GP	W	T	L	GF	GA
England	3	0	1	2	2	11
Wales	1	0	0	1	0	7
