= List of national sports teams of England =

England
- Use: Flag of England

National sports teams of England is an incomplete list of sports teams representing England.

== English representative teams ==
=== Multi-sport events ===
==== Commonwealth Games ====
The team is sent by the Commonwealth Games Council for England to represent England in Commonwealth Games multiple times: 2010, 2006, 2002, 1998, 1994 and in 1962 (event known as British Empire and Commonwealth Games).

A similar team has been sent by the Commonwealth Games Council for England to represent England at the Commonwealth Youth Games.

==== European Championships ====
A team representing England competed separately from Great Britain in Table Tennis events at the 2022 European Championships.

=== Football codes ===
- Australian rules football, England National Australian Rules team
- Futsal, England national futsal team

Association football

- England men's national football team
- England women's national football team
- England national under-21 football team
- England national under-19 football team
- England B national football team
- England C national football team

Rugby league

- England national rugby league team
- England women's national rugby league team
- England national wheelchair rugby league team
- England Knights (men's reserves)
- England Women's Knights (women's reserves)

Rugby union

- England national rugby union team
- England women's national rugby union team

Rugby sevens

- England national rugby sevens team
- England women's national rugby sevens team

Beach Soccer

- England national beach soccer team
- England women's national beach soccer team

=== Batting sport ===
- Badminton, England national badminton team
- Baseball, England national baseball team

Cricket

- England national cricket team
- England national women's cricket team
- England U19 cricket team
- England Lions cricket team
- England national blind cricket team
- England national deaf cricket team

=== Racquet sport ===
- Tennis, England national tennis team

Squash

- England men's national squash team
- England women's national squash team

=== Stick sport ===
- Bandy, England national bandy team
- Roller hockey, England national roller hockey team
- Shinty, English national shinty team

Field hockey

- England men's national field hockey team
- England women's national field hockey team

Lacrosse

- England men's national lacrosse team
- England women's national lacrosse team

=== Other sport ===
- Cycling, England national cycling team
- Kabaddi, England national kabaddi team
- Korfball, England national korfball team
- Netball, England national netball team
- Quadball, England national quadball team
- Roller derby, Team England (roller derby)

Basketball

- England national basketball team
- England women's national basketball team

Curling

- England men's national curling team
- England women's national curling team

== See also ==
- List of national sports teams of the United Kingdom
- Sport in England
- Great Britain at the Olympics
- Membership of the countries of the United Kingdom in international organisations
