= Musée des Lunettes et Lorgnettes Pierre Marly =

Museum of eyeglasses in Paris, France

The Eyewear Museum
- Musée de la lunette
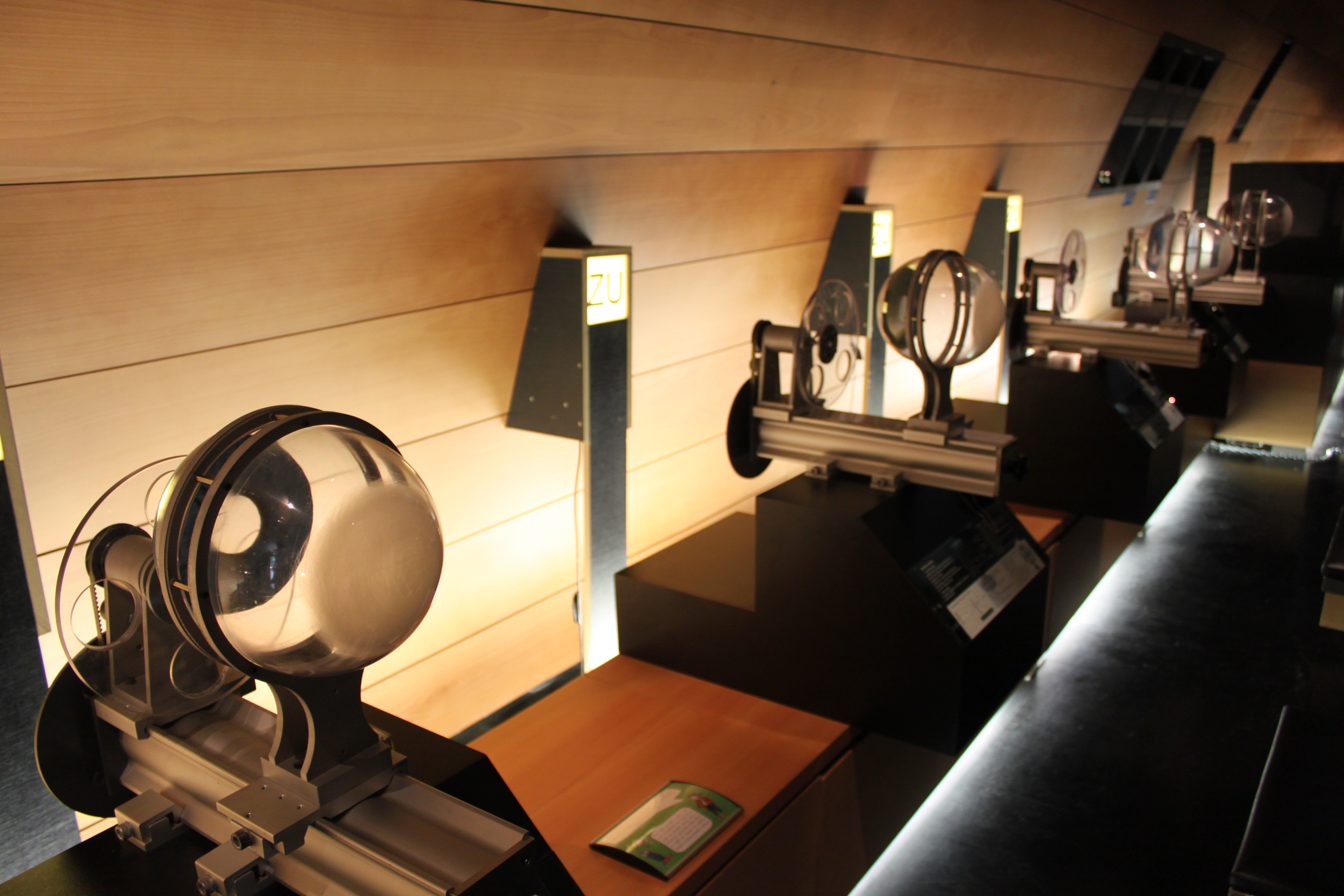
- Musée de la lunette, Morez, France
- Location: Place Jean Jaurès, 39400 Morez, France
- Coordinates: 46.520751°N 6.022346°E
- Type: History of eyeglasses and lenses
- Founder: Pierre Marly
- Website: http://www.musee-lunette.fr/en

The Musée de la Lunette is a museum of eyeglasses located in Morez (Jura - Franche-Comté), France. It was formerly located in Paris, with the name Musée Pierre Marly - Lunettes et Lorgnettes.

The museum was created by Pierre Marly, optician to crowned heads, public figures and celebrities. It contains almost 3,000 objects, ranging from spectacles dating from the 13th century to wooden Inuit snow goggles, with a permanent exhibition of lorgnettes, glasses, telescopes, and binoculars of all shapes and sizes. Items of interest include glasses made for cats and dogs, Maria Callas' contact lens, and glasses belonging to Princess Victoire of France (daughter of Louis XV), the Dalai Lama, Marlene Dietrich, Sammy Davis Jr., Elton John, and lorgnettes belonging to Sarah Bernhardt.

== See also ==
- Essilor – Scientific and technical heritage
