= List of national sports teams of the United Kingdom =

Great Britain
- Use: Flag of the United Kingdom

National sports teams of the United Kingdom is an incomplete list of sports teams representing the United Kingdom. The teams are often referred to as "Great Britain" as they represent the United Kingdom minus Northern Ireland, the residents of which often able to choose to play for either Ireland or the UK.

== Multi-sport events ==
- Great Britain at the Olympics
- Great Britain at the Paralympics
- Great Britain at the European Games
- Great Britain at the European Championships
- A1 Team Great Britain

== American football ==
- Great Britain national American football team

== Australian football ==
- Great Britain men's national Australian rules football team
- Great Britain women's national Australian rules football team

== Baseball ==
- Great Britain national baseball team

== Basketball ==
- Great Britain men's national basketball team
- Great Britain women's national basketball team

== Football ==
- United Kingdom national football team
- Great Britain Olympic football team
- Great Britain women's Olympic football team

== Field hockey ==
- Great Britain men's national field hockey team
- Great Britain women's national field hockey team

== Handball ==
- Great Britain men's national handball team
- Great Britain women's national handball team

== Ice hockey ==
- Great Britain men's national ice hockey team
- Great Britain women's national ice hockey team

== Korfball ==
- Great Britain national korfball team

== Pitch and Putt ==
- Great Britain men's national pitch and putt team

== Rugby League ==
- Great Britain national rugby league team
- Great Britain women's national rugby league team

== Rugby sevens ==
- Great Britain national rugby sevens team
- Great Britain women's national rugby sevens team

== Rugby Union ==
- British and Irish Lions
- Great Britain national women's rugby union team

== Track racing ==
- Great Britain national long track team
- Great Britain national speedway team

== Tennis ==
- Great Britain Davis Cup team
- Great Britain Fed Cup team

== Underwater Hockey ==
- Great Britain national underwater hockey team

== Volleyball ==
- Great Britain men's national volleyball team
- Great Britain women's national volleyball team

== Water polo ==
- Great Britain men's national water polo team
- Great Britain women's national water polo team

== Wheelchair rugby ==
- Great Britain national wheelchair rugby team

== Wheelchair basketball ==
- Great Britain men's national wheelchair basketball team
- Great Britain women's national wheelchair basketball team

== See also ==
- Sport in the United Kingdom
- List of national sports teams of England
- List of national sports teams of Northern Ireland
- List of national sports teams of Scotland
- List of national sports teams of Wales
