= George Adams (scientist, died 1772) =

English instrument maker and science writer

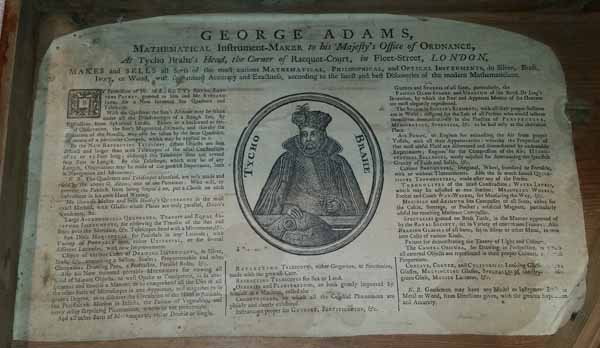
The oldest known trade card for George Adams, at The Mariners' Museum

George Adams the Elder (c. 1709–1772) was an English instrument maker and science writer. His son George Adams the Younger, who carried on the business, was also known as an instrument maker and optician.

== Life ==
He was the eldest surviving son of Morris Adams, a cook, and his wife Mary, and was baptized on 17 April 1709. He was an apprentice to instrument maker James Parker, and, after his death, to Thomas Heath. Adams went into business in 1734 in Fleet Street, London.

With his first wife, Adams had son George Jr. and daughters Sarah and Ann. On 6 July 1748, he married Ann Dudley at St. Martin-In-The-Fields. They had four children, including son Dudley and daughters Isabel and Susannah.

Adams died sometime between writing his will on 26 March 1772, and the will being proven in court on 24 October 1772.

== Instruments ==
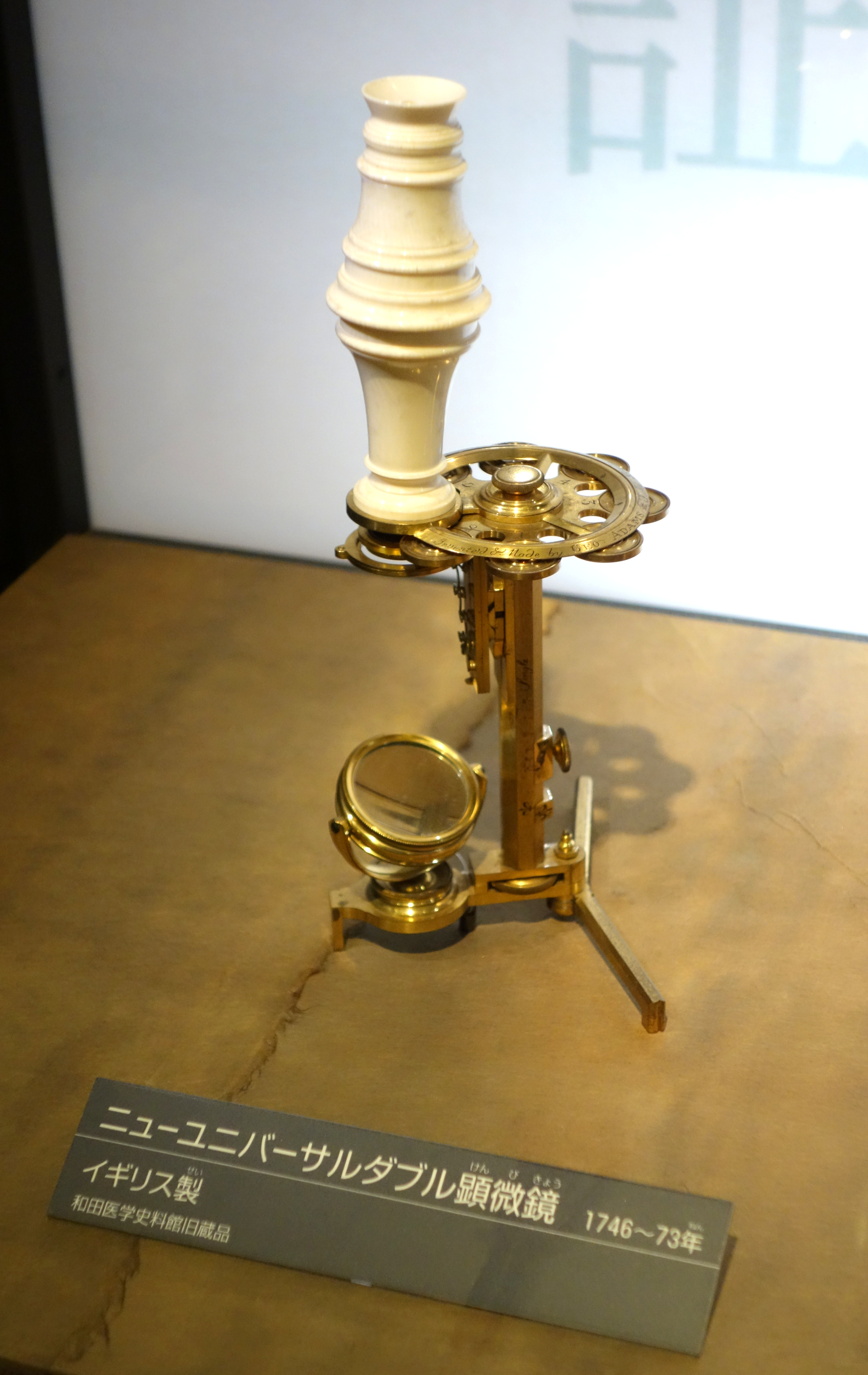
George Adams microscope in the National Museum of Nature and Science, Tokyo

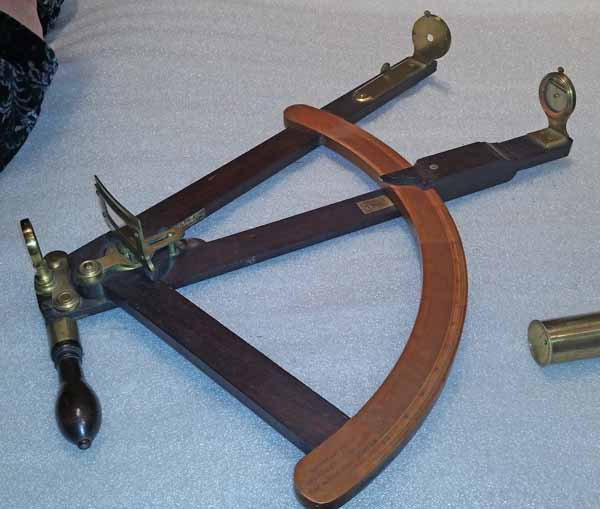
Sea Quadrant by George Adams, at The Mariners' Museum

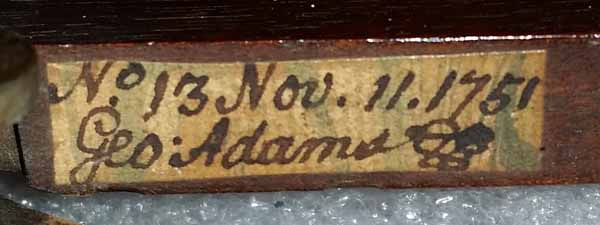
Serial number, date, and signature from George Adams' quadrant, at The Mariners' Museum

== Bibliography ==
Adams was best known for A Treatise Describing the Construction and Explaining the Use of New Celestial and Terrestrial Globes (London: 1766). There were later editions, but the claim of 30 up to 1810 is not now accepted. Other works were:

- Micrographia Illustrata, or the knowledge of the microscope explained (1746), which included "a translation of Mr. Joblott's observations on animalculæ", and had four editions to 1771. Henry Baker attacked this book, on grounds of plagiarism.
- The Description and Use of a new Sea-quadrant for taking the altitude of the sun from the visible horizon (1748).
- The Description and Use of the Universal Trigonometrical Octant was invented and applied to Hadley's Quadrant (1753).
