= England men's national ice hockey team =

England
- Association: English Ice Hockey Association
- IIHF code: ENG

First international
- Switzerland 0–3 England (Chamonix, France; 23 January 1909); Last international Scotland 5–6 England (Edinburgh, Scotland; 29 January 1994)

Biggest win
- England 16–0 Belgium (Montreux, Switzerland; 16 January 1914)

Biggest defeat
- Canada 1–0 England (Paris, France; 25 January 1952)

International record (W–L–T)
- 45–62–8

The English national ice hockey team was the national ice hockey team of England. The club last participated in an international game in 1994, a 6–5 win against Scotland. While England still participates in junior hockey tournaments, in most IIHF tournaments, English players are part of the Great Britain national ice hockey team.
