= England national quadball team =

National quadball team for the nation of England

Team England
- Full name: England National Quadball Team
- Sport: Quadball
- Founded: 2021
- Association: QuadballUK
- League: International Quadball Association
- Colours: Red and White
- Head coach: Seb Waters
- Captain: Alice Twist
- Championships: (gold) 2022 IQA European Games (gold) 2023 WISE Cup (silver) 2024 IQA European Games
- Website: QuidditchUK webpage Quadball England Facebook Page

The English national quadball team is the official national quadball team of England. The team, which is organised by QuadballUK, was founded in 2021 after the splitting of Team UK into separate teams for each of the individual Home Nations. They made their debut at the 2022 IQA European Games in Limerick, winning the tournament.

== History ==
Previously Team UK represented all the countries of the United Kingdom at international tournaments organised by the International Quadball Association. Team UK was founded in 2012, making their debut at the Summer Games in Oxford. Their final tournament appearance was at the 2019 IQA European Games in Bamberg. In 2021, the decision was made to split Team UK into separate teams for England, Scotland (Team Scotland) and Wales (Team Wales). Players from Northern Ireland compete as part of an all-Ireland team with the Republic of Ireland organised by Quidditch Eire.

== Competitive record ==
=== Overview ===
Competition	Position	Number of Teams
(Republic of Ireland) 2022 European Games	1st	20
(Scotland) 2023 WISE Cup	1st	5
(United States) 2023 World Cup	4th	15
(England) 2024 European Games	2nd	15

=== 2022 European Games ===
Team England made their debut at the 2022 European Games held on 22–24 July in Limerick in Ireland, where they placed 1st of 20 teams. The team were placed into group D along with Scotland, Germany, Netherlands and Czech Republic for the group stage on day 1. They finished 2nd in the group below Germany after a 110–140* defeat in their match against them. In the match Germany caught the snitch from behind to even the scores and then went on to score the 3 extra goals required to reach the set score in overtime. During the knockout stage on day 2 they won against Poland, France and then Norway. The final was a rematch against Germany with England winning after catching while 30 points behind then successfully reaching the set score in overtime for a final score of 160*-140.

=== 2023 WISE Cup ===
The 2023 Wales-Ireland-Scotland-England (WISE) Cup was held in Edinburgh, Scotland, organised by Quadball Scotland. England first played Scotland, winning 220*-20. England then beat Wales 230*-10 and Ireland 210*-30. England's final game was an exhibition match against the Celtic Nations, a mix of the Scotland, Welsh and Irish national teams. England were victorious 230*-30. England finished 1st in the tournament: the inaugural champions of the WISE cup.

=== 2023 World Cup ===
The 2023 IQA Quadball World Cup was hosted in Richmond, Virginia, USA, and was Quadball England's World Cup debut. Seeded second, inheriting Team UKs ELO rating, England were placed in Pool B with France, Austria, Mexico and India. In game 1, England beat Austria 190*-40, followed by a set-score victory against Mexico 170–50*. England's highest-ranked opponents of the pool stages, France, were beaten 150*-40 with a second flag catch of the day by Reuben Thompson. In the final game of Pool B, postponed until day 2 due to weather delays, England beat India 220–100* to finish top of their group and second seed overall.

As second seed, England progressed directly to the quarter finals to play Canada. In a lengthy game further delayed by the weather, England ground out a result of 140*-60 thanks to a Jordan Aymer-Jeffrey flag catch. In a tight and tense semi-final against 2022 IQA European Games finalists Germany, England were denied the chance of a game-winning catch by Aymer-Jeffrey for "impeding the flag runner", allowing Germany to go on to catch the flag shortly after to win the game 50–100*. England were to face Belgium after their tightly-fought semi-final against the USA for 3rd place. In front of a large crowd, England lost 60–120* after a lengthy video review showed the Belgium seeker to have been beaten after the catch, and therefore the flag catch was called good.

== Players ==
=== IQA European Games 2022 (Limerick, Ireland) ===
The squad for the 2022 IQA European Games was coached by Alice Walker and captained by Luke Twist.

Surname	First Name	Number
Macartney	Alex	34
Hull	Andy	24
Malpass	Ben	20
Lowe	Bex	13
Werner	Carina	17
Trick	Dan	3
Bryant	Doug	5
Brett	Ed	18
Southwell	El	50
Fisher	Elliot	14
Davies	Fey	2
Sartori	Jacopo	99
Aymer-Jeffrey	Jordan	23
Aziz	Kerry	89
Barrington	Lucy	4
Twist (C)	Luke	7
Kreft	Michal	61
Orridge	Mikey	15
Marmolejo Morazo	Paula	31
Spencer	Sam	28
Waters	Seb	10
Ferenczy	Tash	6
Harris	Tristan	55
Karling	Tua	44

=== WISE Cup 2023 (Edinburgh, Scotland) ===
The 2023 WISE Cup squad was coached by Seb Waters and captained by Andy Hull.

	Surname	First Name	Number	Club
S	Davies	Fey	2	London Quadball Club
S	Fisher	Elliot	14	Velociraptors Quadball Club
K	Houghton	Matt	27	Southsea Quadball Club
K	Hull (C)	Andy	24	Velociraptors Quadball Club
C	Benevise	Manon		Olympians Quadball Club
C	Ferenczy	Tash	6	Werewolves of London
C	Kreft	Michal	61	Werewolves of London
C	Norman	Olivia	19	Oxford Mammoths Quadball Club
C	Southwell	El	50	London Quadball Club
B	Birkitt	Sam	37	Velociraptors Quadball Club
B	Bryant	Doug	5	Werewolves of London
B	Marmolejo Morazo	Paula	31	Phoenix Quadball Club
B	Mills	Sam		Werewolves of London

=== IQA World Cup 2023 (Richmond, USA) ===
The 2023 IQA World Cup squad was head coached by Alice Walker, with assistant coaches Matt Bateman, Simon Bidwell and Luke Twist and captained by Bill Orridge.

	Surname	First Name	Number	Club
S	Aymer-Jeffrey	Jordan	23	Werewolves of London
S	Fisher	Elliot	14	Velociraptors Quadball Club
S	Thompson	Reuben	75	London Quadball Club
K	Veale	Aaron	22	Werewolves of London
K	Waters	Seb	10	London Quadball Club
C	Brett	Ed	18	Werewolves of London
C	Chambers	Jeniva	21	London Quadball Club
C	Emre	Benan	1	London Quadball Club
C	Ferenczy	Tash	6	Werewolves of London
C	Houghton	Matt	27	Southsea Quadball Club
C	Hull	Andy	24	Velociraptors Quadball Club
C	Karling	Tua	44	London Quadball Club
C	Kreft	Michal	61	Werewolves of London
C	Lowe	Bex	13	London Quadball Club
C	Macartney	Alex	34	Phoenix Quadball Club
C	Malpass	Ben	20	London Quadball Club
B	Aziz	Kerry	89	Werewolves of London
B	Barrington	Lucy	4	London Quadball Club
B	Bryant	Doug	5	Werewolves of London
B	Marmolejo Morazo	Paula	31	Phoenix Quadball Club
B	Orridge (C)	Bill	12	Velociraptors Quadball Club
B	Orridge	Mikey	15	Southampton Quadball Club
B	Sartori	Jacopo	99	London Quadball Club
B	Trick	Dan	3	London Quadball Club
B	Werner	Carina	17	London Quadball Club

=== IQA European Games 2024 (London, England) ===
The 2024 IQA European Games squad was head coached by Seb Waters, with assistant coaches Matthew Bateman, Fraser Prosford, Carina Werner, Luckeciano Melo and Tristan Harris. The squad was captained by Alice Twist.

	Surname	First Name	Number	Club
S	Aymer-Jeffrey	Jordan	23	Werewolves of London
S	Purvis	Jonathan	75	London Quadball Club
S	Southwell	El	50	Wessex Warlocks Quadball Club
K	Houghton	Matt	27	Southsea Quadball Club
K	Malpass	Ben	20	London Quadball Club
K	Martin	James	45	Warwick Quadball Club
K	Waters	Seb	10	London Quadball Club
C	Benevise	Manon	36	Olympians Quadball Club
C	Creighton	Jo	3	Velociraptors Quadball Club
C	Emre	Benan	1	London Quadball Club
C	Farrant	Aimée	22	London Quadball Club
C	Ferenczy	Tash	6	Werewolves of London
C	Fisher	Elliot	14	London Quadball Club
C	Macartney	Alex	34	Phoenix Quadball Club
C	Sampat	Khushi	12	Warwick Quadball Club
C	Twist (C)	Alice	9	Werewolves of London
C	Twist	Luke	7	Werewolves of London
B	Brilliant	William	30	Oxford Universities Quadball Club
B	Bryant	Doug	5	Werewolves of London
B	Mandahus	Lena		Werewolves of London
B	Mills	Sam	62	Werewolves of London
B	Orridge	Mikey	15	Southsea Quadball Club
B	Parroquin	Marianna	4	London Quadball Club
B	To	Milo	49	Olympians Quadball Club
B	Vong	Michael	88	Werewolves of London

== International Friendlies ==
=== 2022 Italy Friendlies (Genoa, Italy) ===
England travelled to Genoa to play Italy and Spain on 18th June. England began the day beating Italy B 140–50*, followed by defeating Spain 200*-20. England's final game saw defeat to Italy A 70–120*.

=== 2023 Belgium Friendlies (Ghent, Belgium) ===
To prepare for the 2023 IQA World Cup, England travelled to Ghent to play eight friendlies against Belgium, France, Germany, and Norway. England first faced Norway on day 1, beating them 150–40*. Belgium then defeated England convincingly with a 30–170* scoreline. England improved to beat France 150*-50, only to fall short against Germany 70–120*. Day 2 saw replays of the previous day. England again beat Norway with a scoreline of 130–60*, before beating Belgium 80*-70. England then lost both their final games against France (90–120*) and Germany (70–150*).

=== 2023 Quadball Nations Cup (Salou, Spain) ===
England entered the inaugural 2023 Quadball Nations Cup (QNations) with a development side due to limitations on team selection placed by the tournament organising committee. England were placed in group B with Basque Country, Catalonia, France, Italy and Spain. England began day 1 against Catalonia, winning 120-100*, and France, winning 160-80*. England then faced Basque country, losing 80-90*, before beating Spain 140*-130. The final game of Day 1 came against Italy, losing 40-70*. This placed Team England in a combined-table of 9th. Day 2 started against 10th-placed Czech Republic, finishing 140*-0 in favour of England. This win progressed the team up the table to face Poland, again winning with a scoreline of 130*-50. In doing so, England were matched with Germany in an effective-quarter-final: the winner guaranteed to make the semi-final. In a close game, Germany were victorious with a 90*-60 score, knocking Team England out with a final position of 5th.

=== 2024 Quadball Nations Cup (Salou, Spain) ===
The 2nd edition of the Quadball Nations Cup placed a development England side, captained by Sam Senior, in Group A alongside Belgium, Catalonia, Norway and the United States. England first played Catalonia in a repeat from the previous year, finishing with a score of 180*-110. Belgium came next with a score of 160-100* in favour of England, before the crunch match of the United States where England lost 160*-200. The final game of the group was won by England against Norway with a score of 150-80* to place England 2nd in the group. England entered the knockout stages, playing Canada in the round of 16. This finished with an England win of 140-90*, placing them against France in the quarter final. France edged the game as winners in a close-fought game with a flag catch to end the game at 40-80*. England played a series of placement games following this, ending with England in 5th place thanks to a 160*-50 win against Latin America and 120*-50 win against Australia.

== See also ==
- Quadball
- QuadballUK
- International Quadball Association
- United Kingdom national quidditch team
- Scotland national quadball team
