= George Adams (scientist, died 1795) =

George Adams the Younger (1750–1795) was an English scientist, optician and science writer. He was mathematical instrument maker to King George III of Great Britain, succeeding his father George Adams the Elder in the post. He also made globes.

Around 1770, Adams invented the lucernal microscope, a type of projection microscope where the image is projected on a screen by a large oil lamp, as to make it easier to draw or trace the image.

In politics Adams was a Tory, and as such was received with favour at court by George III. He died 14 August 1795, at Southampton, and was succeeded in his business and in the post of mathematical instrument maker to the king by his brother, Dudley Adams.

== Works ==
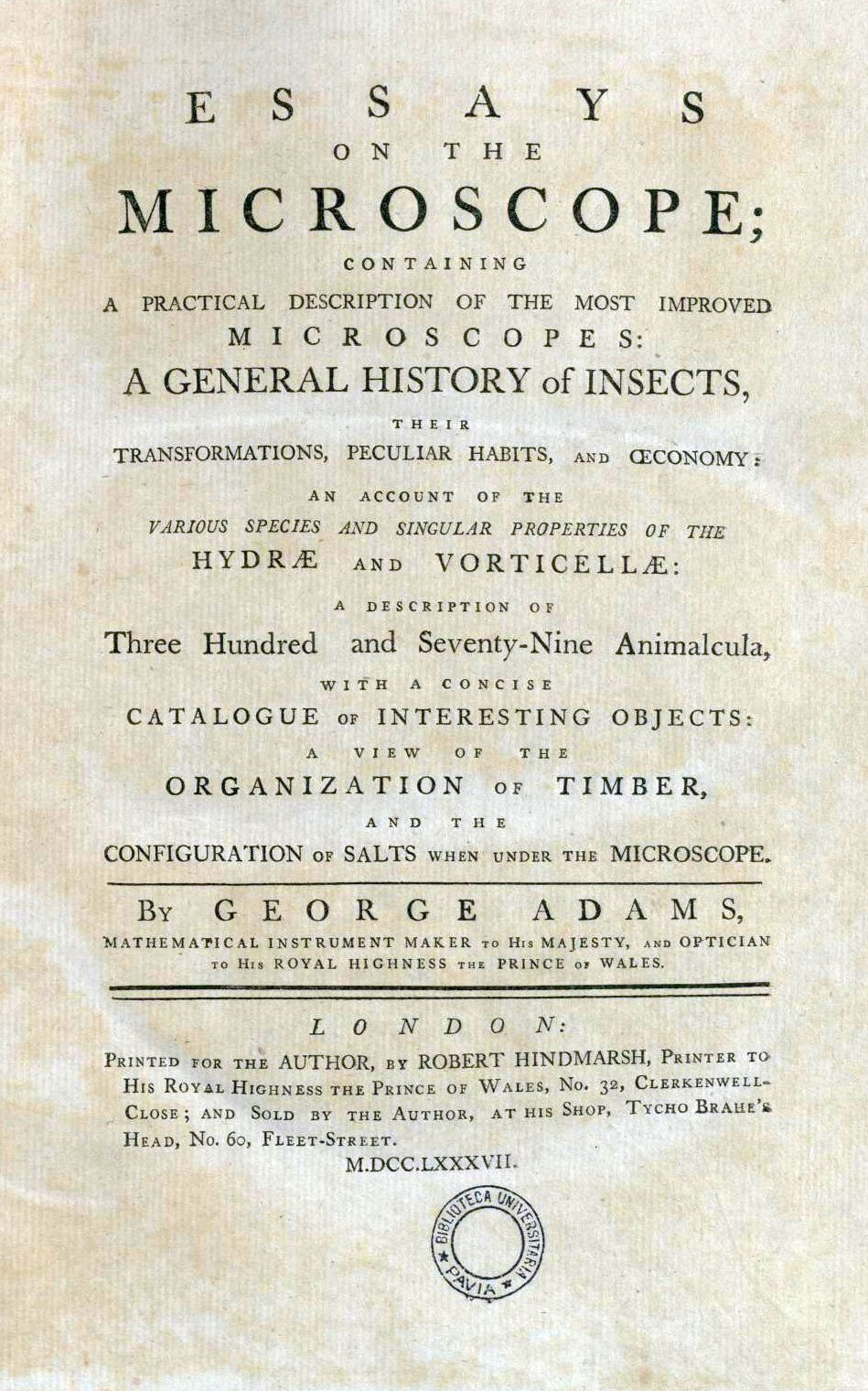
Essays on the microscope, 1787

Adams wrote elementary scientific works, and on the use of mathematical instruments. He often combined religious with a scientific content, against, according to the Gentleman's Magazine, the "growing errors of materialism, infidelity, and anarchy". He started writing at a young age, and developed a love for it. His main interests iwere science and mathematics. His works were:

- An Essay on Electricity, to which is added an Essay on Magnetism (1784).
  - Essay on electricity. London: Robert Hindmarsh. 1787.
- Essays on the microscope. London: Robert Hindmarsh. 1787.
- An Essay on Vision, briefly explaining the fabric of the eye (1789).
- Astronomical and geographical essays. London: Robert Hindmarsh. 1790.
- A Short Dissertation on the Barometer (1790).
- Geometrical and Graphical Essays, containing a description of the mathematical instruments used in geometry, civil and military surveying, levelling and perspective (1790).
- Lectures on Natural and Experimental Philosophy, in five volumes (1794).

For some of Adams's books, plates were published separately, and most of them had more than one edition.

== Gallery ==
Instruments by George Adams
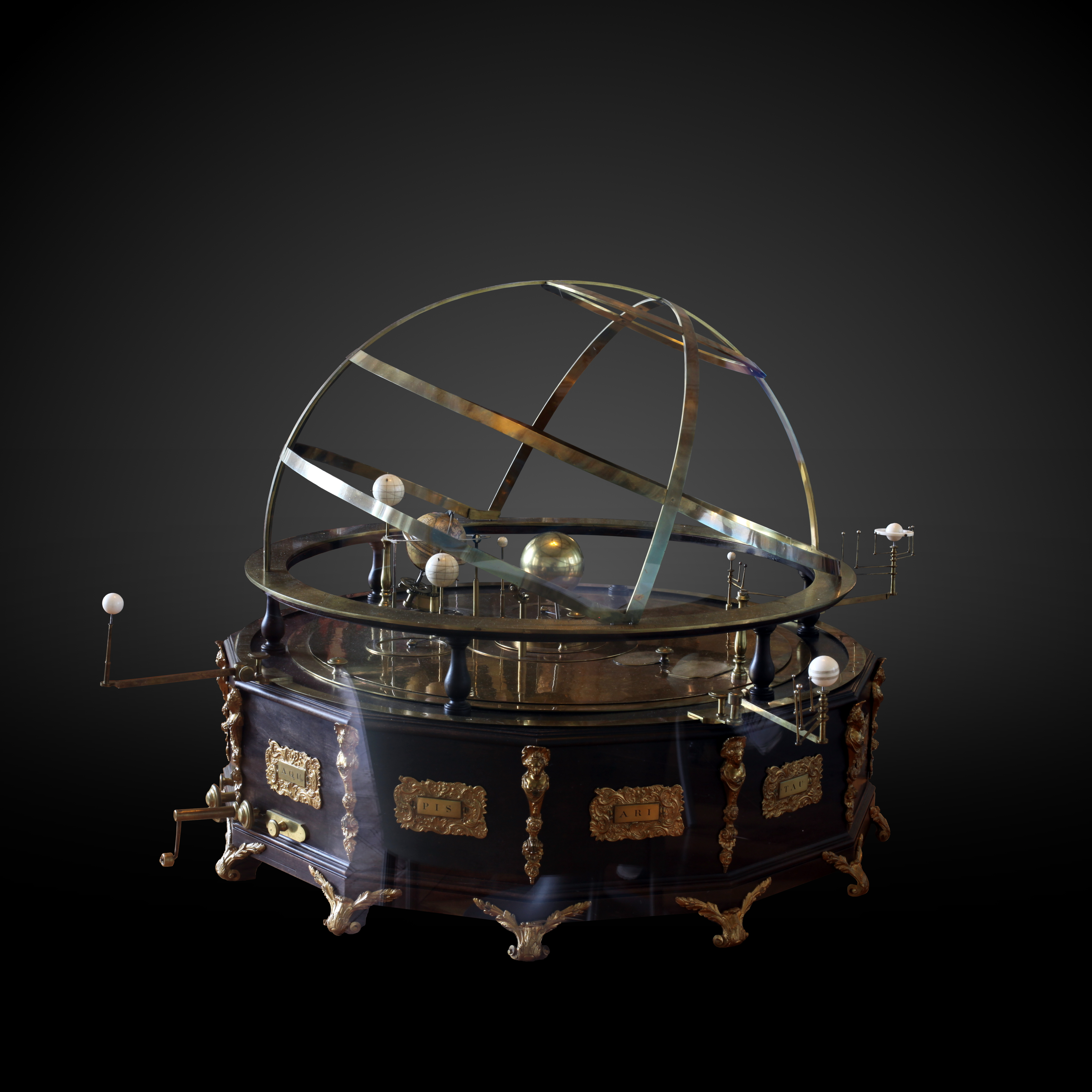
Orrery on display at the Musée d'histoire des sciences de la Ville de Genève.

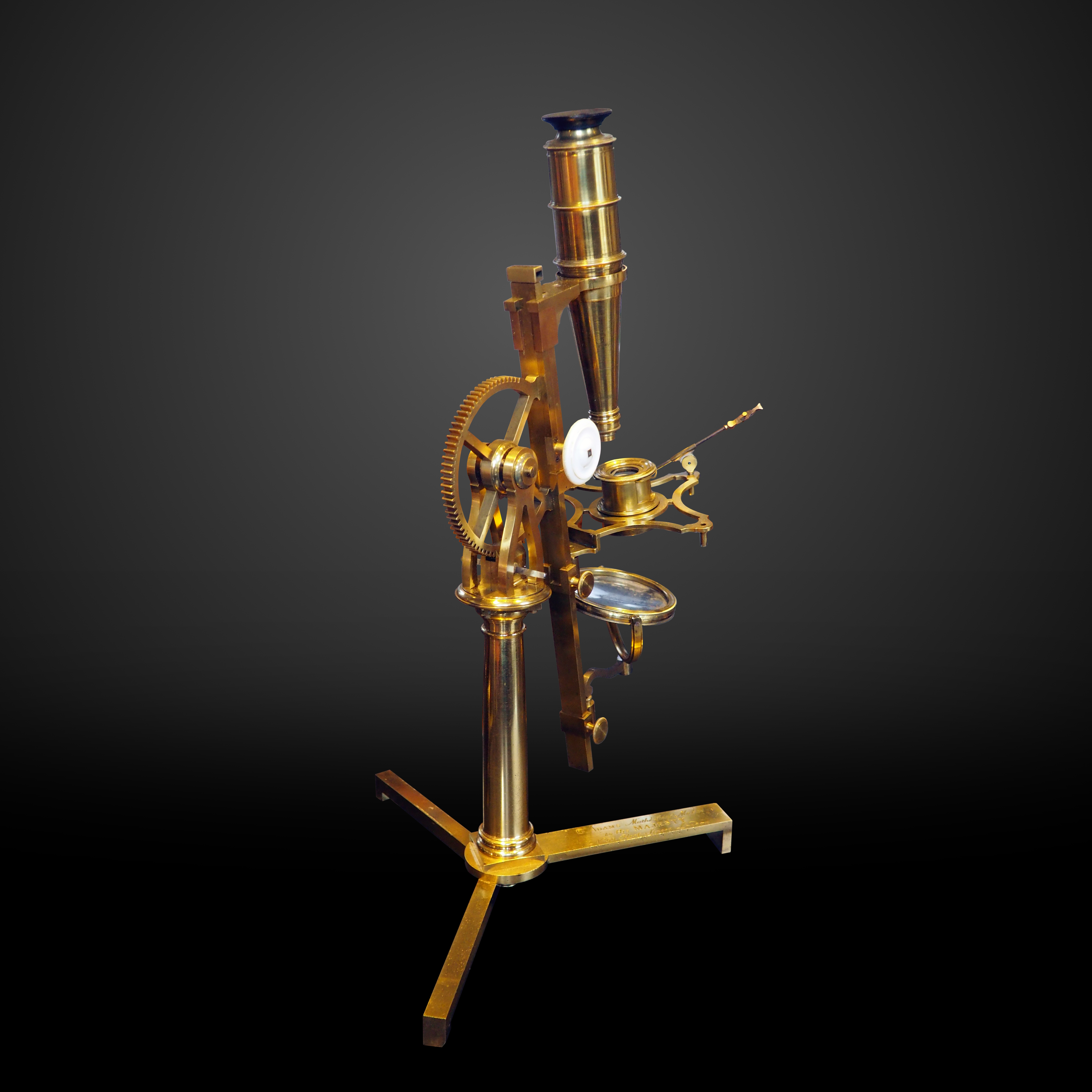
Compound microscope made by George Adams Sr. for Horace-Bénédict de Saussure, on display at Musée d'histoire des sciences de la Ville de Genève

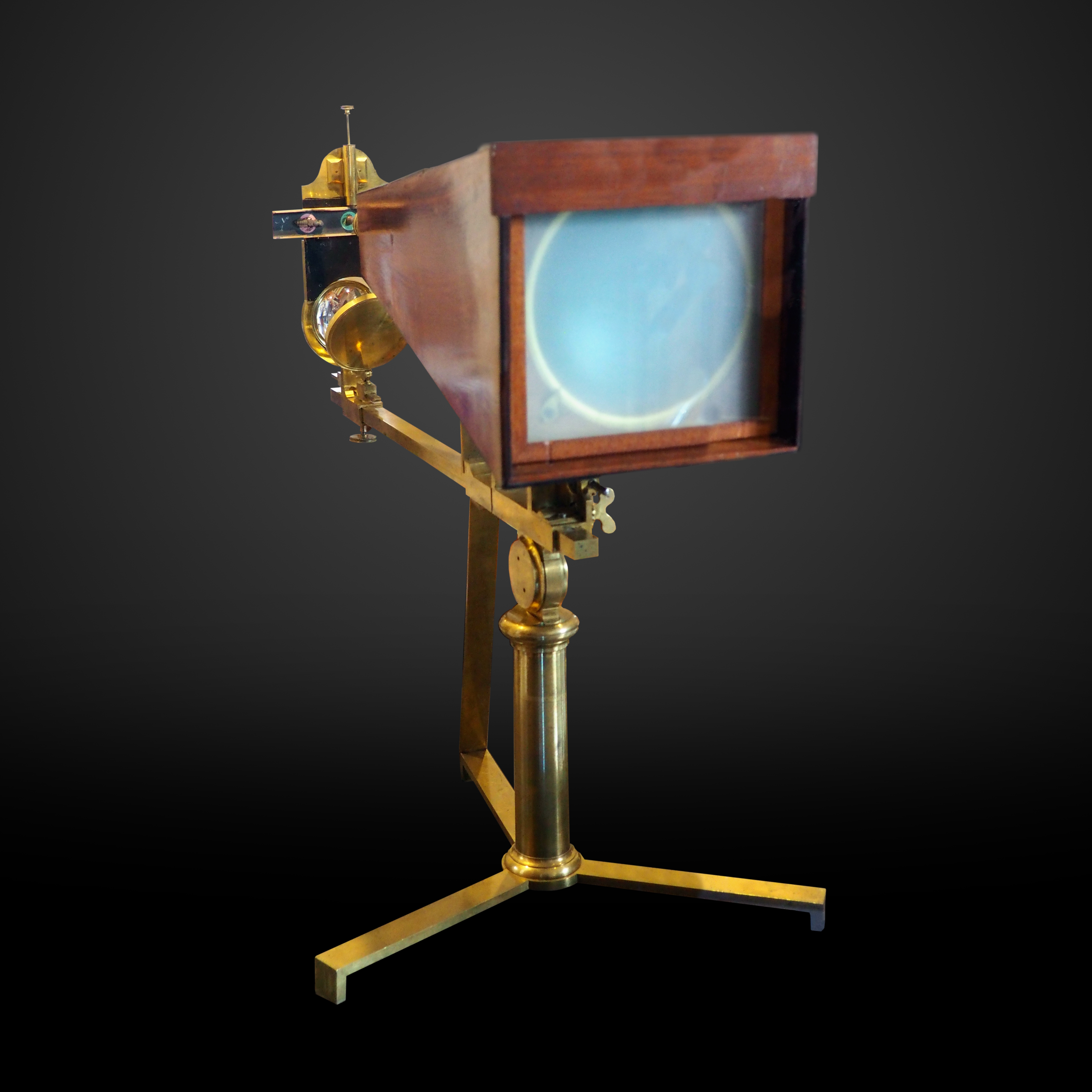
Lucernal microscope made by Thomas Harris of London after the model invented by George Adams, on display at Musée d'histoire des sciences de la Ville de Genève
