= Scotland national ice hockey team =

Scotland
- Association: Scottish Ice Hockey
- IIHF code: SCO
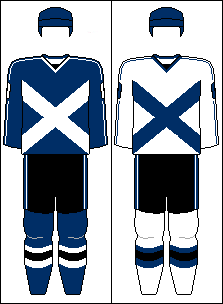

First international
- England 11–1 Scotland (London, England; 26 March 1909); Last international Scotland 5–6 England (Edinburgh, Scotland; 29 January 1994)

Biggest win
- Scotland 14–1 England (Dundee, Scotland; 19 April 1980)

Biggest defeat
- England 11–1 Scotland (London, England; 26 March 1909)

International record (W–L–T)
- 31–21–4

The Scottish national ice hockey team was the national ice hockey team of Scotland. The club last participated in an international game in 1994, a 5–6 loss to England. Scottish players are part of the Great Britain national ice hockey team.
