= Scotland national quadball team =

National quadball team for the nation of Scotland

Team Scotland
- Full name: Scotland National Quadball Team
- Sport: Quadball
- Founded: 2018
- League: International Quadball Association
- Colours: Blue and White
- Owner: QuadballUK
- Head coach: Ben Zinger
- Manager: Natasha Meek
- Captain: Natasha Meek (European Games '26)
- Website: QuadballUK webpage Quadball Scotland Facebook Page

The Scottish National Quadball Team (Note: Scots: Scotland National Buzzumbaw Team) is the official national Quadball team of Scotland. The team, which is organised by QuadballUK, was founded in 2018 and made its tournament debut at the 2019 IQA European Games in Bamberg.

== History ==
Previously Team UK represented all the countries of the United Kingdom at international tournaments organised by the International Quadball Association. Team UK was founded in 2012, making their debut at the Summer Games in Oxford. The first Scotland national team named the Scottish Thistles was formed in 2017 for the Quidditch Premier League, with trials held in Spring 2018. In 2018, the IQA announced that national governing bodies could send regional teams to compete at the upcoming Continental Games and as a result Team Scotland was formed to compete at the international level at the 2019 European Games held in Bamberg. This team would be separate from the UK team and managed and operated independently, however it still acted as representative of QuadballUK at international tournaments.

The team had their debut on 17 November 2018 in Catalonia in a series of friendlies against the Catalan national team. Team Scotland had their official tournament debut when they placed 14th of 20 teams at the 2019 European Games held on 28–30 June.

In 2021 Team UK was officially disbanded and split into the three national teams Team England, Team Scotland and Team Wales. Team Scotland later played at the 2022 European Games in Limerick, placing 15th of 20 teams.

The team runs monthly training sessions that are open to anyone to attend across the 4 cities in Scotland home to local quadball teams (Edinburgh, Glasgow, St Andrews and Stirling).

== Competitive record ==
=== 2019 European Games ===
Scotland made their tournament debut at the 2019 European Games held on 28–30 June in Bamberg, placing 14th of 20 teams. They were coached by Gavin Hughes. In the group stage on day 1 they lost 150*-0 to Belgium, 150-40* to Germany and 190*-30 to Austria but then won against Switzerland 150-60*. On the second day they lost 120-140* to Poland but then won 230*-20 against Finland. Finally they won 170*-80 against Slovenia before losing the 13th place play-off 110*-100 against The Netherlands on the snitch catch.

=== 2022 European Games ===
Scotland placed 15th of 20 teams at the 2022 IQA European Games held on 22–24 July in Limerick. They were placed into group D along with Germany, The Netherlands, England and Czech Republic for the group stage on day 1, playing them in that order. They lost 170*-0 to Germany, 130*-40 to The Netherlands and 270*-20 to England but then won 90*-70 against Czech Republic with a snitch catch. On the second day they won 140*-40 against Hong Kong, lost 110*-30 against Catalonia and lost 40*-130 against Ireland. Finally they won the 15th place play-off 150*-140 against Wales which went into overtime with each team being one goal away from the set score for winning.

=== 2023 WISE Cup ===
Scotland hosted the inaugural 2023 WISE cup in Edinburgh, entering both their competitive squad (Scotland A) and development squad (Scotland B). WISE began with a Scotland A vs Scotland B game in which Scotland B won. Scotland A then played England, losing 20-220*. Scotland A then beat Ireland 110*-80 with a Sam Frohlich flag catch when the scores were level. In their final game, Scotland A lost 70-150*. Scotland B lost to Ireland 90-160*, lost to Wales 100-150* and forfeited their game vs England. Scotland A finished 4th in the tournament and Scotland B 5th.

=== 2023 Q-Nations Cup ===
Scotland attended the inaugural Q-nations cup, held in Salou on 7-8 October 2023. They were drawn in group C, facing Germany, Quadball Ireland, Japan, Poland & Slovenia. They lost their first game, in a tight contest between Quadball Ireland 80*-50. They lost to Poland 150*-60, Japan 170*-30 and Germany 160*-30. They lost the rematch game against Ireland 110*-30. They lost their next game against Vietnam 100-70*. They finished the tournament with a friendly game against Czechia, which they lost 120*-50. This resulted in Scotland placing 18th out of 18 teams.

=== 2024 European Games ===
Scotland attended its second EG, held on 27-28 July in London. Scotland was drawn against Germany, Wales, Italy and France in Group A, as one of two unseeded teams. Their first game was against eventual champions Germany, whom won 210*-0. The Scotland v Wales game was significantly closer, with Wales winning 130-110*. Italy won 210*-30 and France 190*-10. Following the group games, Scotland was drawn against Spain in the first knockout round, and lost 230*-70. Their final game was against Catalonia, whom won a hard fought match via flag catch, 210*-190. Scotland finally placed 14th out of 15 teams.

=== 2024 Q-Nations Cup ===
Scotland attended the second Q-nations tournament in October of 2024. They were drawn in Group B alongside, Austria, France, Hong Kong and Italy. They played their first game against Italy, losing 100*-10. Similar results followed against Hong Kong (120-30*), France (160*-10) and Austria (220*-40). In the first of the knockout games, Scotland lost to hosts Catalonia 150*-40. Scotland then played Breizh, losing 110*-20. Their final game of the tournament came against Quadball Ireland, losing 110*-50 and placing 20th out of 20 teams.

=== 2025 World Cup ===
Scotland made their world cup debut in the 2025 tournament held in Tubize, Belgium on the 11-13th of July. Scotland were unseeded heading into the tournament and were drawn in Pool c, against current holders USA, India, Slovenia and Switzerland. Scotland kicked off their World Cup campaign strong, recording a debut victory against Switzerland, winning 140*-40. They followed this with a tightly contested game against Slovenia, only losing via flag catch 130*-100. Day 2 started with a very tough game against the USA, in which Scotland lost 250*-0. Scotland's final group game was against India, which they lost 200-90*. Following this, Scotland were drawn against Japan in the round of 32, which they lost 160*-70. Following a strong day 1 performance, Scotland dropped into 20-23 consolation bracket. Their first game in this was against Italy, whom beat Scotland 220*-60. This dropped Scotland into the 22nd place play-off, in which they faced the Basque Country. This was another closely fought game, decided via flag catch. Basque caught, resulting in Scotland losing 200*-170. Scotland placed 23rd out of 31 teams, their highest competitive finish to date.

=== 2025 Q-Nations Cup ===
Scotland attended the third edition of the Q-nations cup in Salou on the 4th & 5th of October 2025. They were drawn against Alemanya (The German development team), Catalonia and current World Champions Belgium in Group B. In Scotland's first group game they lost 20*-1 to Alemanya. They were also beaten by Catalonia (16*-2) & Belgium (20*-6). On the second day of fixtures, they played a close match against Breizh, losing 15-11*. In their final game of the tournament, they faced Canada and lost 12*-8. This result placed Scotland in 14th.

=== 2026 WISE Cup ===
The second edition of the WISE cup was hosted in Derby, on the 12th July 2026. Scotland started the tournament against Quadball Ireland, catching to win, 80*-70. Their second game was against England, which they lost 240*-80. Their final game against Wales would deterime ranking. Earlier in the day Ireland beat Wales, and with all other teams losing to England, this final game would determine second and last place. It was a tightly contested game, in which Wales caught, forcing a straight 3 goal overtime for both teams. Scotland scored 3 unanswered goals, winning the game 160-130*. Therefore Scotland placed second, behind England, their highest finish of any tournament.

=== 2026 European Games ===
Scotland attended its third EG, held on 3-4 October in Salou. Scotland was drawn against Catalonia, England, Spain and Turkey in Group C. Their first game was against eventual silver medallists England, whom won 280-80*. Their next game was a close match with Catalonia winning 110-90* in overtime. Then Spain won 160*-10 and Turkey 140*-40. Following the group games, Scotland was placed in the lower bracket and lost a close match 90-70* to Czecho-Slovakia in overtime. Scotland then beat Switzerland 130*-70. Their final game was a tight game against Wales, whom won 180*-170 during golden goal in overtime. Scotland finally placed 14th out of 15 teams.

== Players ==
=== 2022 IQA European Games ===
The squad for the 2022 IQA European Games held in Limerick was coached by Alec Bruns and placed 15th in the tournament out of 20 teams. It consisted of the following players:

Name	Number
Alex Christison	49
Alex Harrison	5
Ben Zinger	31
Bex McLaughlin	84
Brendan Head	47
Caroline Bruns	99
Eamonn Harrison (SC) (Note: Speaking captain, who is the only person who may speak for the team when conversing with officials)	28
Franzi Chyle	26
Hagi Batbayar	1
Ibrahim Khan	9
Iona Anderson	21
James King-Nicholl	19
Emma Humphrey	17
Josh Fogg	50
Laura Jamieson	57
Luis Teschner	23
Marco Lombardi	32
Marcos Malvar	79
Ollie Riley	96
Rebecca Norman	58
Rix Dishington	13
Sam Frohlich (C)	3
Sam Tulloch	69
Shaun Goodfellow	66
Titi Corbal	7

=== 2023 WISE Cup ===
The quad for the 2023 WISE cup consisted of two teams, a competitive Scotland A squad and development Scotland B squad, coached by Kieran Newton.

Scotland A	Scotland B
Alex Christison	Baird McIlwraith
Ben Zinger	Brendan Head (C)
Charlie Smith	Callum Dinnett
Colin Weir	Charlie Mathews
Eamonn Harrison	Charlotte Howcroft
Emma Humphrey	Daniel Farrow
Iona Anderson	George Young
James King-Nickol	Hannah Glover
Jon Gray	Josh Fogg
Khaliun Batbayar (VC)	Kieran Newton
Kiki Dekkers	Ofmat Austus Ofmat
Mairi Weir	Rachel Sales
Marco Lombardi	Robert Souders
Marcos Malvar	Sam Tulloch
Natasha Meek	Samantha Simmons
Sam Frohlich	Shaun Goodfellow
Tom Cope	Sumit Chakraborty (C)
	Yanna Colmerauer

=== 2023 Q-Nations Cup ===
Name
Hagi Batbayar
Alex Harrison
Marcos Malvar
Marco Lombardi
Rebecca Norman
James King-Nichol
Triskele Corbal
Kieran Newton
Eamonn Harrison
Rahel Gerrens
Ben Zinger
Brendan Head
Emma Humphrey
Baird McIlwrath
Natasha Meek
Kiki Dekkers
Tom Cope
Iona Anderson
Charlie Smith
Álvaro Herrera

=== 2024 European Games ===
Name	Number
Alex Harrison	5
Charlie Smith	10
Cherry Gallacher	20
Christina Wang	3
Dan Golding	97
Eamonn Harrison (SC)	28
Emmanuel Fiagbedzi	0
Iona Anderson	21
James King-Nickol	19
Jan Schillmöller	6
Jandels Humphrey	17
Jon Gray	16
Josh Fogg	23
Juliet Simon	15
Hagi Batbayar	1
Laura Jamieson	57
Marco Lombardi	32
Marcos Malvar	79
Max Golding	95
Meg Johnston	60
Miles Pucarelli	36
Natasha Meek	77
Rebecca Norman	58
Tom Cope	73
Yanna Colmerauer	37

=== 2024 Q-Nations Cup ===
Name	Number
Alex Harrison (Reserve)	5
Charlie Smith	10
Cherry Gallacher	20
Christina Wang	3
Dan Golding (Reserve)	97
Eamonn Harrison	28
Ben Zinger (C)	31
Ben Talbot	33
Brendan Head	47
Luke Siever	-
Sam Tulloch	-
Jon Gray	16
Juliet Simon	15
Charlotte Howcroft (Reserve)	52
Ryan Barber	-
Marco Lombardi	32
Marcos Malvar	79
Max Golding (Reserve)	95
Miles Pucarelli	36
Natasha Meek	77
Rebecca Norman	58
Yanna Colmerauer (C)	37

=== 2025 IQA World Cup ===
Name	Number
Isla Adams	4
Alex Harrison	5
Charlie Smith	10
Juliet Simon	15
James King-Nickol	19
Cherry Gallacher (C)	20
Iona Anderson	21
Eamonn Harrison (SC)	28
Ben Zinger (HC)	31
Marco Lombardi	32
Ben Talbot (C)	33
Miles Pucarelli	36
Emily Braun	42
Brendan Head	47
Charlotte Howcroft	52
Becca Norman	58
Calum Reilly	67
Tom Cope	73
Natasha Meek	77
Marcos Malvar	79
Max Golding	95
Anouska Brennand	96

=== 2025 Q-Nations Cup ===
Name	Number
Charlie Smith (C)	10
Juliet Simon	15
Jon Gray	16
James King-Nickol	19
Ben Zinger (HC)	31
Marco Lombardi (C)	32
Ben Talbot	33
Miles Pucarelli	36
Yanna Colmerauer	37
Emily Braun	42
Brendan Head	47
Charlotte Howcroft	52
Julia Logan	-
Luke Siever	64
Natasha Meek	77

=== 2026 Wise Cup ===
Name	Number
Emmanuel Fiagbedzi	0
Alex Harrison	5
Charlie Smith	10
Jon Gray	16
James King-Nickol	19
Eammon Harrison	28
Ben Zinger (HC)	31
Marco Lombardi	32
Ben Talbot	33
Becca Norman	58
Calum Reilly (C)	67
Natasha Meek	77
Ava McConnell (Note: Mercenary)	-
Jessie Ho (Note: Mercenary)	-

=== 2026 European Games ===
Name	Number
Cris Wang	3
Alex Harrison	5
Calum Reilly	9
Charlie Smith	10
Callum Humphreys	14
Juliet Simon	15
Jon Gray	16
James King-Nickol	19
Eammon Harrison	28
Ben Zinger	31
Marco Lombardi	32
Ben Talbot	33
Miles Pucarelli	36
Yanna Colmerauer	37
Emily Braun	42
Brendan Head	47
Rachel Sales	55
Becca Norman	58
Natasha Meek (C)	77
Max Golding	95

== Competitive Results ==
Year	Competition	Result
2022	IQA European Games	15th of 20
2023	Wise Cup	4th (A) 5th (B) of 5
2023	Quadball Nations Cup	18th of 18
2024	IQA European Games	14th of 15
2024	Quadball Nations Cup	20th of 20
2025	IQA World Cup	23rd of 31
2025	Quadball Nations Cup	14th of 14
2026	WISE Cup	2nd of 4
2026	IQA European Games	14th of 15

== See also ==
- Quadball
- QuadballUK
- International Quadball Association
- United Kingdom national quidditch team
