= Wales women's national ice hockey team =

Wales

First international
- Wales 4–1 England (Nottingham, England; May 18, 2002)

Biggest win
- Wales 7–0 Scotland (Paisley, Scotland; April 10, 2004)

International record (W–L–T)
- 3-0-0

The Wales women's national ice hockey team represents Wales in international ice hockey competitions. Since 2002, the team has participated in two friendlies.

== All-time record against other nations ==
Team	GP	W	T	L	GF	GA
Scotland	2	2	0	0	11	0
England	1	1	0	0	4	1

- 18 May 2002: England 1 – Wales 4
- 1 February 2004: Northern Conference 0 – Wales 3
- 10 April 2004: Scotland 0 – Wales 7
- 25 June 2005: Wales 4 – Scotland 0
