= England women's national ice hockey team =

England
- Association: English Ice Hockey Association

First international
- Denmark 5–1 England (Lyss, Switzerland; 18 December 1987)

Biggest win
- England 7–0 Scotland (Sheffield, England; 30 January 1993)

Biggest defeat
- Denmark 5–1 England (Lyss, Switzerland; 18 December 1987)

International record (W–L–T)
- 2–1–2

The England women's national ice hockey team represents England in international ice hockey competitions. Since 1987, the team has participated in five games.

== All-time record against other nations ==
Team	GP	W	T	L	GF	GA
Scotland	3	2	1	0	11	2
Wales	1	0	0	1	1	4
Denmark	1	0	0	1	1	5
