= Women in England =

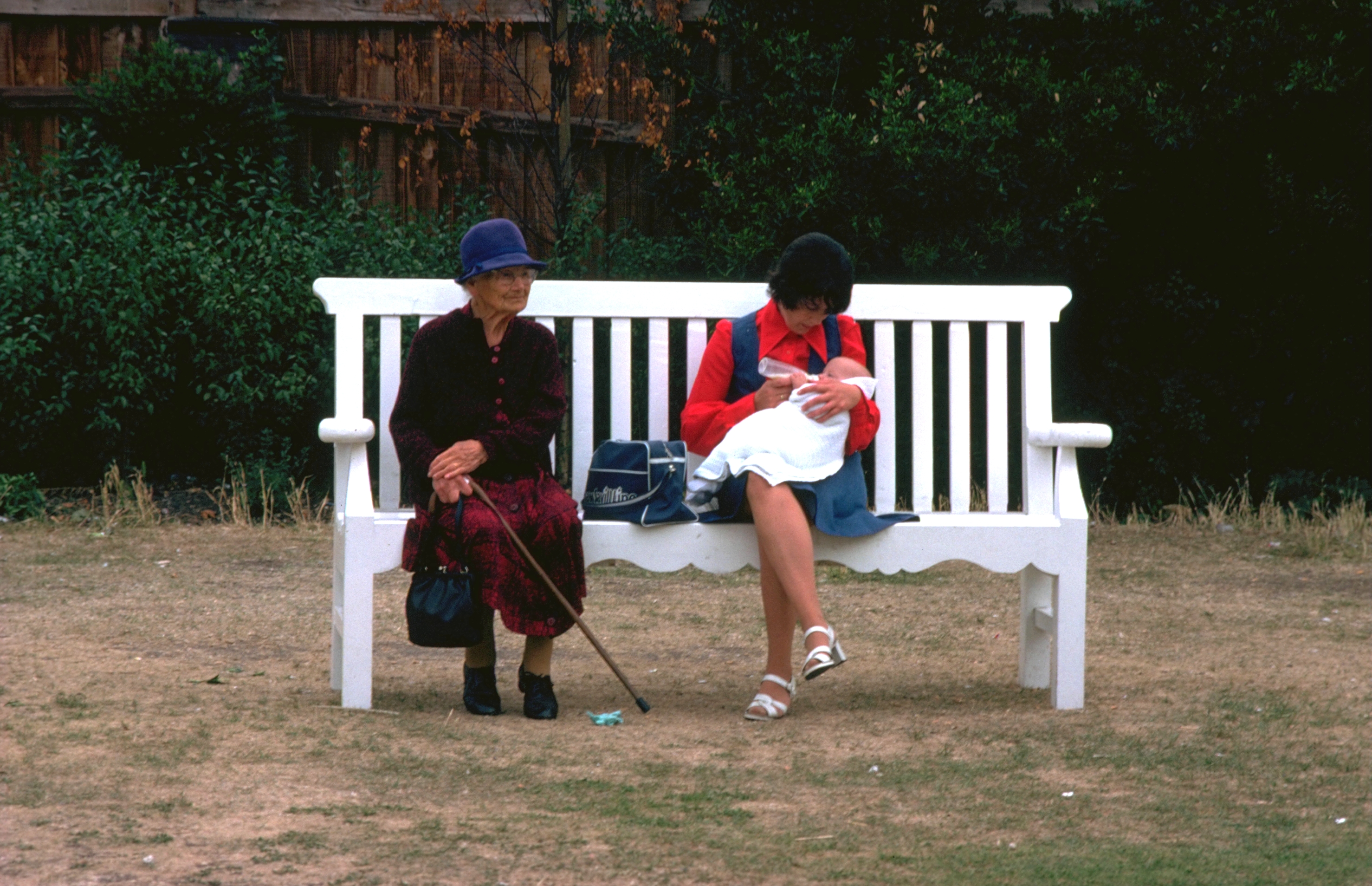
Three generations of women in England: The mother, her daughter, and her granddaughter.

Women in England are women who live in or are from England.

== History ==
The Women's Liberation Movement (WLM) began as recently as the early 1960s. It began with the introduction of birth control pills. It was only provided to women who were wedded under the law to seek out contraceptive pills. Three years after the proposal, women were given the rights to inherit property. Within that same decade, women were granted the rights to have abortions under the Abortion Act. This was deemed legal as long as the pregnancy did not pass the 24th week mark.

In 1970, the call to conference of the Women's Liberation Movement was held to raise awareness. The four main concerns addressed were equal pay between genders, providing fair education and job opportunities for women, coverage of abortion and contraception, and availability of 24-hour nurseries – free of charge.

From there on, a chain reaction of reformation within the United Kingdom emerged. Rape Crisis centers were created, Women's Aid was formed, the Sex Discrimination Act was signed, domestic violence was called out, and conferences were held more than ever to protect women. These movements were the stepping-stone used to scaffold the modern day era of England's feminine culture.

== Education ==
The School Workforce found that females are leading in the education field. Women make up most of the faculty within a classroom and as headteachers. Women's are more likely to go to university and to obtain a bachelor or post graduate degree than men.

== Religion ==
Traditionally, the Anglican priesthood was reserved for men.

Although Anglican men tended to be more influential throughout the history of England, the faith also allowed for prominent feminist movements to occur. Agnes Maude Royden and Edith Picton-Turbeville were among some of the most well-known figures in this area. Women involved in the Anglican feminist movements also tended to advocate for suffragist causes. In the year 1930, Royden founded the Society for Equal Ministry of Women, which proved to be instrumental in making women equal in the positions of power offered in the Anglican faith.

When the Sex Discrimination Act 1975 was passed, it did not apply to the church, causing women to branch out and create their own religious groups.

In 2014, the Church of England appointed the first woman bishop, Libby Lane. In 2026, Sarah Mullally succeeded Justin Welby as Archbishop of Canterbury, becoming the first woman to lead the Church of England and the Anglican Communion.

== See also ==
- Women in the Victorian era
