= Alba (shinty team) =

- Union: Camanachd Association
- Ground(s): Pairc nan Laoch, Portree
- Coach(es): (Scotland) Sean MacLeòid (Scotland) Aonghas MacAonghais
- Captain(s): Gilleasbuig MacDonald
Team kit

First international
- Alba 1-2 – 3-3 CLG Mícheál Breathnach (Republic of Ireland) , Oban, Scotland, 10 June 2007

Largest win
- Alba 0-30 – 0-7 CLG Micheal Breathnach (Republic of Ireland) , Portree, Scotland, February 2010

Largest defeat
- (Scotland) Alba 0-5 – 0-31 CLG Micheal Breathnach (Republic of Ireland) , Cois Fharraige, Ireland, 12 October 2013

Alba is a shinty team selected to represent Scotland and Scottish Gaelic which plays annually in a composite rules international series, Iomain Cholmcille with hurling teams who represent the Irish Language. The prerequisite for playing in this team is that a player can speak Scots Gaelic.

== History ==
Gaelic was the traditional language of shinty, hence its Gaelic names camanachd and iomain. Many of the rules of the game were originally written in Gaelic but due to the decline of the Gaelic language, there are now few areas where Gaelic and shinty are both strong outwith the Isle of Skye. However, the recent resurgence of the language in urban areas as well as the re-establishment of shinty in areas such as Ardnamurchan and the Western Isles has seen a broadening of the availability of Gaelic speaking players.

The first fixture was played as part of the Feill Chaluim Chille festival in Mull and Oban in 2007. It is now played on a regular basis as part of Iomain Cholmcille which receives support from Colmcille. The aim of the festival is to encourage the use of Gaelic and Irish in a sporting context.

Alba lost the first two fixtures in the series but had a resounding win in February 2010 (this actually the 2009 fixture held over) against the Irish in Portree at the ground of Skye Camanachd.

The October 2010 was a close affair in Galway which the Irish won 15–13. The next Iomain Cholmcille series was held Easter 2012 in Skye. In this tournament, two new teams competed alongside Alba and na Breathnaigh - Skye Camanachd Gaelic Speakers (Na Sgitheanaich) and Fir Uladh, representing the province of Ulster. This tournament had a unique twist with a shinty semi-final and a hurling semi-final (which was also the first recorded hurling fixture in the Highlands of Scotland). This format resulted in the Skye team progressing to the final and defeating Micheal Breathnach. Alba for their part, ensured third place with a defeat of Fir Uladh in the 3/4 play-off.

Alba were Scotland's sole representatives at Iomain Cholmcille 6 in Connemara on 12 October 2013. They lost heavily to Micheal Breathnach.

In 2014, in Glasgow, Alba lost 14–6 to Fir Uladh on a wet November day. They won their first ever Iomain Cholmcille on Irish Soil in 2015 when they defeated Fir Uladh by two points in Gaoth Dobhair.

In 2016, Micheal Breathnach were the opponents in Galway, but as the match was played in the middle of the shinty season, the Alba side was a young and inexperienced, but acquitted themselves well and were unfortunate to lose 16-4.

Alba has continued to perform over the years. In 2017 they won Iomain Cholmcille in Fort William defeating Fir Uladh in the final 4-1 played with shinty goals.

In 2018 Alba competed twice in the year for the first time since 2010, Alba played England in a representative shinty game at Kingussie winning 11-1, and then won an epic Iomain Cholmcille tournament in Gaoth Dobhair, overcoming Micheal Breathnach in sudden death extra time.

In 2019 Alba hosted Fir Uladh in Glasgow, and lost 15-13 in a very tight game played at Glasgow Green as part of Mòd Ghlaschu and Iomain Cholmcille.

== Alba Women's Team ==
Boireannaich na h-Alba have been playing since 2015.
