= Membership of the countries of the United Kingdom in international organisations =

Countries of the United Kingdom

The United Kingdom is a sovereign state that is made up of four countries: England, Northern Ireland, Scotland, and Wales. Three of these countries; Northern Ireland, Scotland and Wales, have their own devolved legislatures and governments and are represented in some international intergovernmental organisation separately from the United Kingdom as a whole. All four countries have membership in several international sports federations and are represented by their own national teams in sports where there is no UK-wide team.

== England ==
Intergovernmental organisations

England has no devolved legislature or government and is therefore not represented as a single entity in intergovernmental organisations.

International sports federations

- Badminton World Federation
- Commonwealth Games Federation
- FIFA (UEFA)
- International Chess Federation (European Chess Union)
- International Cricket Council
- International Golf Federation
- International Hockey Federation
- International Kabaddi Federation
- International Korfball Federation
- International Rugby League
- International Table Tennis Federation
- International Volleyball Federation (European Volleyball Confederation)
- World Boccia
- World Bowls
- World Boxing
- World Croquet Federation
- World Curling
- World Darts Federation
- World Lacrosse
- World Netball
- World Rugby (Rugby Europe)
- World Squash (European Squash Federation)

== Northern Ireland ==
Intergovernmental organisations

- British-Irish Council
- British–Irish Parliamentary Assembly
- Commonwealth Parliamentary Association
- Congress of Local and Regional Authorities - Chamber of Regions
- EU–UK Parliamentary Partnership Assembly (observer)
- North/South Inter-Parliamentary Association
- North/South Ministerial Council

International sports federations

- Commonwealth Games Federation
- FIFA (UEFA)
- International Volleyball Federation (European Volleyball Confederation)
- World Darts Federation

Additionally, at some international sports events, athletes from Northern Ireland and the Republic of Ireland participate as part of a unified team representing the Island of Ireland.

== Scotland ==
Intergovernmental organisations

- British-Irish Council
- British–Irish Parliamentary Assembly
- Council of the Nations and Regions
- Commonwealth Parliamentary Association
- Congress of Local and Regional Authorities - Chamber of Regions
- EU–UK Parliamentary Partnership Assembly (observer)
- National Economic Council
- Nordic Council (observer since 2022)
- Prime Minister and Heads of Devolved Governments Council

International sports federations

- Badminton World Federation
- Commonwealth Games Federation
- FIFA (UEFA)
- International Chess Federation (European Chess Union)
- International Cricket Council
- International Golf Federation
- International Hockey Federation
- International Rugby League
- International Table Tennis Federation
- International Volleyball Federation (European Volleyball Confederation)
- International Korfball Federation
- World Boxing
- World Bowls
- World Croquet Federation
- World Darts Federation
- World Lacrosse
- World Netball
- World Rugby (Rugby Europe)
- World Squash (European Squash Federation)

== Wales ==
Intergovernmental organisations

- British-Irish Council
- British–Irish Parliamentary Assembly
- Commonwealth Parliamentary Association
- Congress of Local and Regional Authorities - Chamber of Regions
- EU–UK Parliamentary Partnership Assembly (observer)

International sports federations

- Badminton World Federation
- Commonwealth Games Federation
- FIFA (UEFA)
- International Chess Federation (European Chess Union)
- International Esports Federation
- International Golf Federation
- International Hockey Federation
- International Korfball Federation
- International Rugby League
- International Table Tennis Federation
- World Bowls
- World Boxing
- World Darts Federation
- World Lacrosse
- World Rugby (Rugby Europe)
- World Squash (European Squash Federation)

== See also ==
- Foreign relations of the United Kingdom
- Intergovernmental relations in the United Kingdom
- Membership of British Overseas Territories and Crown Dependencies in international organisations
