= List of national sports teams of Northern Ireland =

National sports teams of Northern Ireland is a list of sports teams representing Northern Ireland. Additionally, at some international sports events, athletes from Northern Ireland and the Republic of Ireland participate as part of a unified team representing the Island of Ireland.

== Multiport events ==
- Northern Ireland at the Commonwealth Games

== Single sport events ==
- Badminton
  - Northern Ireland national badminton team
- Cricket
  - Northern Ireland national cricket team
- Football
  - Northern Ireland national football team
  - Northern Ireland national football B team
  - Northern Ireland national under-23 football team
  - Northern Ireland national under-21 football team
  - Northern Ireland national under-19 football team
  - Northern Ireland national under-18 schoolboys football team
  - Northern Ireland national under-17 football team
  - Northern Ireland national under-16 football team
  - Northern Ireland national cerebral palsy football team
  - Northern Ireland national futsal team
  - Northern Ireland women's national football team
  - Northern Ireland women's national under-19 football team
  - Northern Ireland women's national under-17 football team
- Netball
  - Northern Ireland national netball team
- Volleyball
  - Northern Ireland men's national volleyball team
  - Northern Ireland women's national volleyball team

== See also ==
- Sport in Northern Ireland
