= Northern and Southern Cups =

Northern Cup
Tournament information
- Month played: November / February
- Established: 2014
- Administrator: QuidditchUK
- Format: Round-Robin
- Participants: 10 (in 2021)
- Number of events: 2
- Website: QuidditchUK website

Current champion
- Holyrood Hippogriffs

Southern Cup
Tournament information
- Month played: November / February
- Established: 2014
- Administrator: QuidditchUK
- Format: Round-Robin
- Participants: 5 (in 2021)
- Number of events: 2
- Website: QuidditchUK website

Current champion
- Southampton Quidditch Club

The Northern and Southern Cups are the two major regional quidditch tournaments of the United Kingdom. Organised by QuadballUK, the tournaments serve both as qualification prerequisites for other tournaments, such as the European Quidditch Cup and the British Quidditch Cup alongside being their own stand alone tournaments. Regionals are often considered the most important tournaments of the year after the British Quidditch Cup and they serve as qualifiers for the latter tournament. Those teams that fail to qualify for BQC each season compete in the Development Cup instead. From 2021 onwards the tournaments have been held as a series of one-day fixtures exclusively for university teams with the equivalent Community League tournament held for community teams.

== History ==
Locations of the Northern (blue) and Southern (red) Cups

The idea for a regional tournament originally came from Southampton Quidditch Club, who devised an independently organised Southern Cup, which was due to take place in February 2014. Inspired by this, Keele Quidditch Club created a counterpart "Northern Squirrel Cup" open to all the teams who were not invited to the Southern Cup (on the basis of geographical location). Due to adverse weather conditions, the Southern Cup's expected debut was cancelled, but the Northern Cup went ahead as planned in March. Eight teams competed, with Bangor Broken Broomsticks winning the tournament after beating Nottingham in the final. The Southern Cup eventually went ahead in November of that year—the next quidditch season—where another eight teams competed. Southampton, the hosts, were defeated in the final by Radcliffe Chimeras.

Seeing the initial success of these tournaments, QuadballUK, the United Kingdom's governing body for quidditch, took both tournaments under their control, in time for the 2015–16 season. These tournaments were organised by QuadballUK and a committee selected by them, rather than by any specific club. Similarly, no club officially hosted either tournament, though both locations were situated nearby to established QuadballUK teams. The Northern Cup was hosted at Belmont Community School in Durham on 31 October–1 November, while the Southern Cup took place at Horspath Athletics Ground in Oxford, on 14–15 November. The latter had played host to several tournaments in the past, including the 2015 European Quidditch Cup.

From 2016 onwards as there were now more teams in the United Kingdom than the British Quidditch Cup could support both the Northern and Southern Cups were used as qualifiers for it. From 2016 to 2019, the top 16 teams from each tournament moved on to BQC, with any teams who did not qualify eligible to compete instead at the Development Cup.

In 2021 following the Quidditch UK university-community split the format of both cups was changed. Instead of being single two-day knockout tournaments Northern and Southern now take place as series of two single day round-robin fixtures with only university teams competing. The new equivalent Community League following the same format but with three single day fixtures per season was set-up for community teams. The top 12 teams across both Northern and Southern qualify for the university tournament at the British Quidditch Cup, with the top 12 community teams across the Community League qualifying for the community BQC tournament. Development Cup is still held for any teams who do not qualify for BQC.

== Qualification ==
Qualification for either tournament is based solely on the geographical location of the team, with no regard to experience or skill level. A theoretical horizontal line is drawn at latitude 52.632000 (52°37′55.2″), dictating that any teams based south of that line compete at the Southern Cup, and all north at the Northern Cup. Up until 2021 there was no additional criteria and any team registered with QuadballUK was eligible to play. From the 2021/2022 season onwards, only teams affiliated with a university could compete at the Northern and Southern Cups and a separate UK-wide Community League was created for community teams.

== Format ==
Traditionally, the tournaments have consisted of pool play, followed by bracket play, in a standard knockout tournament structure. The exact format however is flexible, due to the varying number of teams competing in each iteration of the cups. The top two teams from each group move through to the upper bracket while the rest play in the consolation bracket. In order to balance group play and allow for more representative bracket play a seeding system is used.

=== Seeding ===
All teams are split into three categories: first seeds, second seeds and unseeded teams. How teams are seeded depends on where they came at last years nationals and how many groups there are in the competition. Each group is randomly allocated a first and second seeded team, then the unseeded teams are randomly allocated a group.

The teams final standing in tournaments affects their seeding for the upcoming British Quidditch Cup. The top four teams are placed in the first seed, the fifth to eighth teams are second seeded, and any other qualifying teams are unseeded.

=== University/community team split and new format ===
For the 2021/2022 season and onwards, the format of the Northern and Southern Cups was changed. University and community teams would no longer compete together with there now being a separate Community League for teams not affiliated with a university. This meant that only university teams would now compete at Northern and Southern. In addition, the format of both tournaments was changed. Teams now compete in either two or three (depending on the number of teams attending) divisions within their region, with each division having 4-6 teams in it. Each cup is now split across two different 1 day events instead of being a singular 2 day tournament. Teams play a round-robin event within their division during each fixture and are ranked accordingly. Teams who place last in their division are relegated to the division below and teams who place first in their division are promoted to the division above for the next fixture. The final rankings after all fixtures are used to determine seedings and qualification for the British Quidditch Cup and European Qualifier Tournament.

== Past champions ==
=== Northern champions ===
Year	Host	Winner	Score	Runner-up	Third place	Score	Fourth place	Number of teams
2014	Keele Quidditch Club	Bangor Broken Broomsticks	80-60*	Nottingham Nightmares	Keele Squirrels	90^–60*	Loughborough Longshots	8
2015	Belmont Community School, Durham	Nottingham Nightmares	150*-50	Durhamstrang	Loughborough Longshots	100*–70	Keele Squirrels	14
2016	Belmont Community School, Durham	Velociraptors QC	150*-30	Durhamstrang	Tornadoes QC	120-110^	Loughborough Longshots	20
2017	Sheffield Hallam Sports Park, Sheffield	Velociraptors QC	180*-20	York Horntails	Holyrood Hippogrifs Firsts	90-70*	Tornadoes QC	25
2018	Sheffield Hallam Sports Park, Sheffield	Velociraptors QC	270*-50	Megalodons	Holyrood Hippogriffs Firsts	150*-100	Glasgow Grim Reapers	22
2019	Sheffield Hallam Sports Park, Sheffield	Velociraptors QC	120-60*	Olympians Quidditch Club	Holyrood Hippogriffs Firsts	110*-80	Megalodons	20

==== Updated format ====
Season	Fixture	Host	Division 1			Division 2		
Season	Fixture	Host	Winner	Runner-up	Number of teams	Winner	Runner-up	Number of teams
2021/2022	Northern 1	Salford Sports Village, Manchester	Holyrood Hippogriffs	Leicester Thestrals	5	Manchester Manticores	Bangor Broken Broomsticks	5
2021/2022	Northern 2	Edinburgh	Cancelled due to poor pitch conditions					

=== Southern champions ===
Year	Host	Winner	Score	Runner-up	Third place	Score	Fourth place	Number of teams
2014	Southampton Quidditch Club	Radcliffe Chimeras	140* - 30	Southampton QC	London Unspeakables	50* - 40	Falmouth Falcons	8
2015	Horspath Athletics Ground (Oxford)	Radcliffe Chimeras	130* - 90	Warwick QC	Southampton QC Firsts	100* - 0	Brizzlebears	17
2016	Millbrook Rugby Club (Southampton)	Warwick QC	40* -20	Werewolves of London	BrizzleBears	110* - 30	London Unspeakables	17
2017	Millbrook Rugby Club (Southampton)	Southampton QC Firsts	140* - 90	Werewolves of London	Warwick QC	120* - 30	Bristol Bears	21
2018	Knole Academy (Sevenoaks, Kent)	Werewolves of London	70* - 60	London Quidditch Club	London Unspeakables	120* - 90	Southampton QC Firsts	18
2019	Oxford Brooks University	Werewolves of London Firsts	160°° - 120*°	London Unspeakables	London Quidditch Club A	160* - 10	Oxford Mammoths	16

==== Updated Format ====
Season	Fixture	Host	Division 1		
Season	Fixture	Host	Winner	Runner-up	Number of teams
2021/2022	Southern 1	King's House Sports Ground, London	Southampton Quidditch Club	Warwick Quidditch Club	5
2021/2022	Southern 2	Cardiff City House of Sport, Cardiff	Southampton Quidditch Club	Exeter Eagles	5

== Northern Cup ==
=== 2014 ===
The first Northern Cup was held at Keele University in March 2014. Eight teams competed over the weekend with Bangor Broken Broomsticks being the eventual winners. The final standings were as follows:

==== Final standings ====
Position	Team
1st	Bangor Broken Broomsticks
2nd	Nottingham Nightmares
3rd	Keele Squirrels
4th	Loughborough
5th	Chester
6th	Leeds Griffins
7th	Derby QC
8th	HogYork Horntails

=== 2015 ===
The second Northern Cup was held on 31 October 2015 in Belmont. Fourteen teams competed after the withdrawal of the Preston Poltergeists. After two days of competitive games, composed of pool play and both upper and Consolation brackets, the final standings were as follows:

==== Upper bracket ====
Quarter-finals
Loughborough Longshots	90*
Holyrood Hippogriffs	10
Durhamstrang	110
Leicester Thestrals	70*
Keele Squirrels	150*
Bangor Broken Broomsticks	50
Nottingham Nightmares	180
Leeds Griffins	40*

Semi-finals
Loughborough Longshots	30
Durhamstrang	70*
Keele Squirrels	40
Nottingham Nightmares	130*

Final
Durhamstrang	50
Nottingham Nightmares	150*
Third place
Loughborough Longshots	130*
Keele Squirrels	70

==== Consolation bracket ====
Semi-finals
Derby Union	100*
HogYork Horntails	40
St Andrews Snidgets	0
Chester Centurions	60*

Final
Derby Union	100*
Chester Centurions	40

==== Final standings ====
Position	Team	Stage	Position	Team	Stage
1st	Nottingham Nightmares	Final	8th	Leeds Griffins	Quarters
2nd	Durhamstrang	Final	9th	Derby Union QC	LB final
3rd	Loughborough Longshots	Semis	10th	Chester Centurions	LB final
4th	Keele Squirrels	Semis	11th	St Andrews Snidgets	LB semi Finals
5th	Leicester Thestrals	Quarters	12th	HogYork Horntails	LB semi Finals
6th	Bangor Broken Broomsticks	Quarters	13th	Durham Direwolves	Group stages
7th	Holyrood Hippogriffs	Quarters	14th	Manchester Manticores	Group stages

=== 2016 ===
The third Northern Cup returned to Belmont on 12 November 2016. Twenty teams competed over the weekend. On the first day, five groups of four played each other, with the two highest ranked teams from each group moving into the upper bracket while the rest competed in the Consolation bracket. This was the first tournament to be used to qualify teams for nationals, with the top 16 teams invited to compete in the coming British Quidditch Cup. The results of the tournament were as follows:

==== Upper bracket ====
Play-in games
Holyrood Hippogriffs Firsts	100*
Nottingham Nightmares	90
Leicester Thestrals	140*
Manchester Manticores	70

Quarter-finals
Loughborough Longshots	90*
Holyrood Hippogriffs Firsts	30
Leeds Griffins	50
Durhamstrang	170*
Velociraptors QC	180*
Leicester Thestrals	0
Bangor Broken Broomsticks	40
Tornadoes QC	200*

Semi-finals
Loughborough Longshots	90
Durhamstrang	110*
Velociraptors QC	120*
Tornadoes QC	20

Final
Durhamstrang	30
Velociraptors QC	160*
Third place
Loughborough Longshots	110^
Tornadoes QC	120

==== Consolation bracket ====
Play-in games
St Andrews Snidgets	90*
Holyrood Hippogriffs Seconds	30
Liverpool	240*
Preston	0

Quarter-finals
St Andrews Snidgets	10
Derby	50*
Sheffield	130*
Chester	0
HogYork	170*
Liverpool	0
Durham Direwolves	40*
Keele Squirrels	110

Semi-finals
Derby	60
Sheffield	140*
HogYork	130*
Keele Squirrels	70

Final
Sheffield	30
HogYork	220*

After bracket play had finished, two more matches were played between the four quarter-finals losers in order to rank the 15th–18th places:

Chester	130*	20	St Andrews Snidgets
Direwolves	90*	10	Liverpool

==== Final standings ====
Position	Team	Stage	Position	Team	Stage	Position	Team	Stage
1st	Velociraptors QC	Final	9th	Nottingham Nightmares	UB play ins	17th	Liverpuddly Cannons	BQC playoffs
2nd	Durhamstrang	Final	10th	Manchester Manticores	UB play ins	18th	St Andrews Snidgets	BQC playoffs
3rd	Tornadoes QC	Semis	11th	York	LB Finals	19th	Holyrood Hippogriffs Seconds	LB play ins
4th	Loughborough Longshots	Semis	12th	Sheffield QC	LB finals	20th	Preston	LB play ins
5th	Bangor	Quarters	13th	Derby QC	LB Semi Finals			
6th	Leeds Griffins	Quarters	14th	Keele Squirrels	LB Semi Finals			
7th	Leicester Thestrals	Quarters	15th	Durham Direwolves	LB Quarter Finals			
8th	Holyrood Hippogriffs Firsts	Quarters	16th	Chester	LB quarter Finals			

=== 2017 ===
The fourth Northern Cup was held at Sheffield Hallam Sports Park on 25–26 November 2017. Twenty-five teams competed over the weekend. Velociraptors Quidditch Club were the champions for the second time in a row.

==== Final standings ====
Position	Team	Position	Team	Position	Team
1st	Velociraptors	10th	Leicester Thestrals	19th	Glasgow Grim Reapers
2nd	York Horntails	11th	Manchester Manticores	20th	Liverpuddly Catapults
3rd	Holyrood Hippogriffs Firsts	12th	Chester Centurions	21st	Derby Deamons
4th	Tornadoes QC	13th	Nottingham Nightmares	22nd	Preston Poltergeists
5th	Loughborough Longshots	14th	Liverpuddly Cannons	23rd	Northumbrian Ridgebacks
6th	Keele Squirrels	15th	Holyrood Hippogriffs Seconds	24th	Manchester Minotaurs
7th	Leeds Griffins	16th	Sheffield Steelfins	25th	Sheffield Sealions
8th	Bangor Broken Broomsticks	17th	Durhamstrang		
9th	Sheffield Squids	18th	St Andrews Snidgets		

=== 2018 ===
The fifth Northern Cup was held at Sheffield Hallam Sports Park on 10–11 November 2018. Twenty-two teams competed over the weekend. On the first day, 2 groups of five and three groups of four played each other, with the top 12 ranked teams overall moving into the upper bracket, with 8 further teams playing play-in matches, with the losers joining the final two teams in the Consolation bracket. The top 16 teams were invited to compete in the upcoming British Quidditch Cup; the unsuccessful teams would have another opportunity to qualify via the Development Cup. The top 5 teams were invited to EQT, the nationwide qualifying tournament for the upcoming European Quidditch Cup. The results of the tournament were as follows:

==== Group stage ====
Key to colours in group tables
Qualified for Upper Bracket as a top 12 team
Qualified for Upper Bracket Play-ins

Placement	Team	Win	Lose	QPD-C (Note: Quaffle Point Difference - Capped)	QPD-T (Note: Quaffle Point Difference - Total)	WSC (Note: Winning Snitch Catches)	TRT (Note: Total Regulation Time (up until first snitch catch))
1st	Manchester Manticores	4	0	220	240	4	1:33:47
2nd	Nottingham Nightmares	3	1	280	450	3	1:45:51
3rd	Derby Daemons	2	2	-100	-130	3	1:14:24
4th	Holyrood Hippogriffs Seconds	1	3	-40	-20	1	1:15:11 (Note: Regulation time between Holyrood Hippogriffs Seconds and Manchester Minotaurs was not recorded.)
5th	Manchester Minotaurs	0	4	-360	-540	0	1:00:09

Nottingham Nightmares	210* - 10	Manchester Minotaurs
Manchester Manticores	110* - 10	Holyrood Hippogriffs Seconds
Nottingham Nightmares	200* - 40	Holyrood Hippogriffs Seconds
Manchester Manticores	120* - 20	Derby Daemons
Nottingham Nightmares	200* - 30	Derby Daemons
Holyrood Hippogriffs Seconds	190* - 10	Manchester Minotaurs
Manchester Manticores	140* - 0	Manchester Minotaurs
Derby Daemons	100** - 70°°	Holyrood Hippogriffs Seconds
Nottingham Nightmares	110 - 130*	Manchester Manticores
Derby Daemons	160* - 20	Manchester Minotaurs

Placement	Team	W	L	QPD-C	QPD-T	WSC	TRT
1st	Megalodons	4	0	330	650	3	1:16:28
2nd	Sheffield Squids	3	1	160	250	2	1:16:44
3rd	York Horntails	2	2	40	60	1	1:16:50
4th	Stirling Dumyat Dragons	1	3	-170	-230	1	1:16:01
5th	Bangor Broken Broomsticks	0	4	-360	-730	0	1:18:16

York Horntails	40* - 110	Megalodons
Sheffield Squids	130 - 60*	Stirling Dumyat Dragons
York Horntails	90 - 40*	Stirling Dumyat Dragons
Sheffield Squids	200* - 0	Bangor Broken Broomsticks
York Horntails	200* - 50	Bangor Broken Broomsticks
Stirling Dumyat Dragons	10 - 200*	Megalodons
Sheffield Squids	30 - 120*	Megalodons
Bangor Broken Broomsticks	10 - 150*	Stirling Dumyat Dragons
York Horntails	50 - 120*	Sheffield Squids
Bangor Broken Broomsticks	0 - 360*	Megalodons

Placement	Team	W	L	QPD-C	QPD-T	WSC	TRT
1st	Liverpuddly Cannons	3	0	170	180	3	1:03:03
2nd	Leeds Griffins	2	1	120	160	2	0:57:44
3rd	Durhamstrang	1	2	-80	-90	1	1:05:14
4th	Loughborough Longshots	0	3	-210	-250	1	1:01:59

Loughborough Longshots	60*° - 100°*	Durhamstrang
Leeds Griffins	80 - 110*	Liverpuddly Cannons
Leeds Griffins	110* - 50	Durhamstrang
Loughborough Longshots	40 - 150*	Liverpuddly Cannons
Liverpuddly Cannons	170* - 40	Durhamstrang
Loughborough Longshots	20 - 180*	Leeds Griffins

Placement	Team	W	L	QPD-C	QPD-T	WSC	TRT
1st	Holyrood Hippogriffs	3	0	50	50	4	0:56:32
2nd	Glasgow Grim Reapers	2	1	220	220	2	0:57:57
3rd	Leicester Thestrals	1	2	-60	-60	2	1:01:14
4th	Chester Centurions	0	3	-210	-210	0	1:01:17

Holyrood Hippogriffs	120°* - 90*°	Leicester Thestrals
Chester Centurions	20 - 140*	Glasgow Grim Reapers
Chester Centurions	40 - 130*	Leicester Thestrals
Holyrood Hippogriffs	130** - 110°°	Glasgow Grim Reapers
Holyrood Hippogriffs	120* - 30	Chester Centurions
Glasgow Grim Reapers	150* - 30	Leicester Thestrals

Placement	Team	W	L	QPD-C	QPD-T	WSC	TRT
1st	Velociraptors QC	3	0	270	790	2	0:55:34
2nd	St Andrews Snidgets	2	1	20	-60	2	1:10:46
3rd	Tornadoes QC	1	2	-60	-180	1	1:01:26
4th	Sheffield Steelfins	0	3	-230	-550	0	1:04:04

Velociraptors QC	370* - 0	Sheffield Steelfins
Tornadoes QC	70 – 120*	St Andrews Snidgets
Velociraptors QC	250 - 40*	St Andrews Snidgets
Tornadoes QC	100* - 20	Sheffield Steelfins
Velociraptors QC	240* - 0	Tornadoes QC
St Andrews Snidgets	210* - 40	Sheffield Steelfins

==== Upper bracket ====
Play-in games
Holyrood Hippogriffs Seconds	100*
Chester Centurions	30
Tornadoes QC	80*
Stirling Dumyat Dragons	20
Derby Daemons	70*
Loughborough Longshots	60
Durhamstrang	140*
Sheffield Steelfins	20

Round of 16
Velociraptors QC	300*
Holyrood Hippogriffs Seconds	10
Leeds Griffins	150
Sheffield Squids	220*
Manchester Manticores	100*
Tornadoes QC	10
Holyrood Hippogriffs	120*
Leicester Thestrals	20
Megalodons	220*
Derby Daemons	30*
Nottingham Nightmares	140*
St Andrews Snidgets	40
Liverpuddly Cannons	110*
Durhamstrang	10
Glasgow Grim Reapers	140°*
York Hortails	90*°

Quarter-finals
Velociraptors QC	240
Sheffield Squids	30*
Manchester Manticores	30
Holyrood Hippogriffs	80*
Megalodons	160*
Nottingham Nightmares	80
Liverpuddly Cannons	40
Glasgow Grim Reapers	110*

Semi-finals
Velociraptors QC	200*
Holyrood Hippogriffs	80
Megalodons	100*
Glasgow Grim Reapers	40

Final
Velociraptors QC	270*
Megalodons	50
Third place
Holyrood Hippogriffs	150*
Glasgow Grim Reapers	100

==== EQT/Fifth-place play-off ====
Play-in games
Sheffield Squids	80
Manchester Manticores	130*
Nottingham Nightmares	20
Liverpuddly Cannons	80*

EQT play-off
Manchester Manticores	70
Liverpuddly Cannons	140*

==== Consolation bracket ====
Play-in games
Stirling Dumyat Dragons	130*
Bangor Broken Broomsticks	50
Sheffield Steelfins	80
Manchester Minotaurs	220*

Semi-finals
Chester Centurions	120*
Stirling Dumyat Dragons	10
Loughborough Longshots	110
Manchester Minotaurs	30*

Final
Chester Centurions	110° (Note: The snitch survived for 45 minutes and thus the game was decided on quaffle points alone.)
Loughborough Longshots	120°

==== Final standings ====
Position	Team	Stage	Position	Team	Stage	Position	Team	Stage
1st	Velociraptors QC	Final	9th	Leeds Griffins	Round of 16	17th	Loughborough Longshots	Consolation Final
2nd	Megalodons	Final	10th	St Andrews Snidgets	Round of 16	18th	Chester Centurions	Consolation Final
3rd	Holyrood Hippogriffs Firsts	Semi-final	11th	Durhamstrang	Round of 16	19th	Manchester Minotaurs	Consolation Semi-final
4th	Glasgow Grim Reapers	Semi-final	12th	Tornadoes QC	Round of 16	20th	Stirling Dumyat Dragons	Consolation Semi-final
5th	Liverpuddly Cannons	EQT Final	13th	York Horntails	Round of 16	21st	Bangor Broken Broomsticks	Consolation Play-in
6th	Manchester Manticores	EQT Final	14th	Leicester Thestrals	Round of 16	22nd	Sheffield Steelfins	Consolation Play-in
7th	Nottingham Nightmares	EQT Semi-final	15th	Holyrood Hippogriffs Seconds	Round of 16			
8th	Sheffield Squids	EQT Semi-final	16th	Derby Daemons	Round of 16			

=== 2019 ===
The sixth Northern Cup was held at Sheffield Hallam Sports Park on 23–24 November 2019, making it the third Northern in a row to be held at that venue. Twenty teams competed over the weekend. On the first day, 5 groups of four teams each played each other. At the end of this group stage, the teams were all ranked 1-20 based on their performance. The top 4 ranked teams then played against each other (the team ranked 1st played against the team ranked 4th, 2nd played against 3rd), with this process then continuing for teams 5-8 and so on. This 'ranking bracket' stage, which took place over the end of day 1 and start of day 2 and allowed for teams to move up or down the rankings for the final 'play-in bracket' stage on the second day. This final stage consisted of each team playing two more games, effectively a 'semi-final' and then either a 'final' or 'consolation' match within each group of 4 rankings (1-4, 5–8, etc.). The top 15 teams qualified for the British Quidditch Cup in April 2020, however this tournament was later cancelled due to COVID-19. The 2nd-to-7th ranked teams were invited to EQT, the nationwide qualifying tournament for the upcoming European Quidditch Cup. Due to weather conditions the grass pitches at the venue were unable to be used resulting in all matches being played on 3G which affected the planned play-in stage. The results of the tournament were as follows:

==== Group stage ====
===== Group A =====
Megalodons	80* - 10	Leicester Thestrals
Nottingham Nightmares	180* - 30	Manchester Minotaurs
Megalodons	190 - 30*	Nottingham Nightmares
Leicester Thestrals	200 - 40*	Manchester Minotaurs
Megalodons	230 - 30*	Manchester Minotaurs
Nottingham Nightmares	40 - 170*	Leicester Thestrals

===== Group B =====
Holyrood Hippogriffs Firsts	190* - 0	Durhamstrang
Olympians Quidditch Club	210* - 0	Stirling Dumyat Dragons
Holyrood Hippogriffs Firsts	110* - 130	Olympians Quidditch Club
Durhamstrang	20 - 50*	Stirling Dumyat Dragons
Holyrood Hippogriffs Firsts	190* - 0	Stirling Dumyat Dragons
Olympians Quidditch Club	160* - 20	Durhamstrang

===== Group C =====
Velociraptors	270* - 0	Holyrood Hippogriffs Seconds
York Horntails	150* - 10	Sheffield Steelfins
Velociraptors	320* - 0	York Horntails
Holyrood Hippogriffs Seconds	190* - 20	Sheffield Steelfins
Velociraptors	300* - 0	Sheffield Steelfins
York Horntails	40 - 160*	Holyrood Hippogriffs Seconds

===== Group D =====
Liverpuddly Cannons	90* - 80	Sheffield Squids
St Andrews Snidgets	70* - 30	Bangor Broken Broomsticks
Liverpuddly Cannons	200* - 40	St Andrews Snidgets
Sheffield Squids	130 - 80*	Bangor Broken Broomsticks
Liverpuddly Cannons	110 - 60*	Bangor Broken Broomsticks
St Andrews Snidgets	60 - 180*	Sheffield Squids

===== Group E =====
Leeds Griffins	30 - 120*	Loughborough Longshots
Glasgow Grim Reapers	20 - 100*	Chester Centurions
Glasgow Grim Reapers	120* - 40	Leeds Griffins
Chester Centurions	140* - 70	Loughborough Longshots
Glasgow Grim Reapers	60 - 90*	Loughborough Longshots
Leeds Griffins	10 - 140*	Chester Centurions

==== Ranking Stage ====
In each ranking bracket the participants of the second match would be the loser of a higher-ranked first match playing the winner of the next lower-ranked first match. For example, Chester Centurions lost against Velociraptors in their first match so they then played against Holyrood Hippogriffs Firsts who won the next match down in the rankings. The exceptions to this are the winners of the highest-ranked first match (Velociraptors and Olympians Quidditch Club) and the losers of the lowest-ranked first match (Manchester Minotaurs and Sheffield Steelfins) in each ranking bracket who all did not play a second match.

===== Ranking Bracket 1 =====
Round 1				Round 2		
Match Number	Team ranking	Team	Score	Match Number	Team	Score
1	1st	Velociraptors	220*	11	Chester Centurions	50
1	4th	Chester Centurions	0	11	Holyrood Hippogriffs Firsts	190*
3	6th	Sheffield Squids	30	13	Sheffield Squids	140*
3	7th	Holyrood Hippogriffs Firsts	210*	13	Holyrood Hippogriffs Seconds	50
5	9th	Holyrood Hippogriffs Seconds	150*	15	York Horntails	40
5	12th	York Horntails	30	15	St Andrews Snidgets	130*
7	14th	St Andrews Snidgets	140*	17	Stirling Dumyat Dragons	30
7	15th	Stirling Dumyat Dragons	20	17	Durhamstrang	180*
9	17th	Durhamstrang	80°°° (Note: The score was tied after the snitch catch resulting in the match going into overtime, however the score was still tied after the overtime period. This resulted in second overtime which ended immediately upon Durhamstrang scoring a goal.)			
9	20th	Manchester Minotaurs	70*°°			

===== Ranking Bracket 2 =====
Round 1				Round 2		
Match Number	Team ranking	Team	Score	Match Number	Team	Score
2	2nd	Megalodons	80	12	Megalodons	130*
2	3rd	Olympians Quidditch Club	100*	12	Liverpuddly Cannons	40
4	5th	Liverpuddly Cannons	100*	14	Leicester Thestrals	170*
4	8th	Leicester Thestrals	90	14	Loughborough Longshots	70
6	10th	Loughborough Longshots	100	16	Glasgow Grim Reapers	140*
6	11th	Glasgow Grim Reapers	40*	16	Nottingham Nightmares	60
8	13th	Nottingham Nightmares	160*	18	Bangor Broken Broomsticks	60
8	16th	Bangor Broken Broomsticks	40	18	Leeds Griffins	100*
10	18th	Leeds Griffins	120*			
10	19th	Sheffield Steelfins	50			

==== Play-in Stage ====
As a result of the grass pitches not being used because of the weather, the play-in stage was significantly cut down. It was originally scheduled that all teams would compete in this stage to determine the final standings, however only half the planned number of matches were played and as a result some teams did not play any matches in this stage.

===== Final =====
Play-in
Velociraptors	180*
Megalodons	0
Olympians Quidditch Club	90*
Holyrood Hippogriffs Firsts	60

Final
Velociraptors	120
Olympians Quidditch Club	60*
Third place
Megalodons	80
Holyrood Hippogriffs Firsts	110*

===== 7th place playoff =====
Play-in
Chester Centurions	30
Leicester Thestrals	140*
Liverpuddly Cannons	150
Sheffield Squids	70*

7th place playoff
Chester Centurions	110*
Sheffield Squids	100

===== 15th place playoff =====
Play-in		15th place playoff	
Team	Score	Team	Score
York Horntails	90	York Horntails	150*
Leeds Griffins	180*	Durhamstrang	0FF (Note: The match did not actually take place as Durhamstrang forfeited the match.)
Nottingham Nightmares	150*		
Durhamstrang	70		

==== Final standings ====
Position	Team	Position	Team	Position	Team
1st	Velociraptors	9th	Holyrood Hippogriffs Seconds	17th	Bangor Broken Broomsticks
2nd	Olympians Quidditch Club	10th	Loughborough Longshots	18th	Sheffield Steelfins
3rd	Holyrood Hippogriffs Firsts	11th	St Andrews Snidgets	19th	Manchester Minotaurs
4th	Megalodons	12th	Glasgow Grim Reapers	20th	Stirling Dumyat Dragons
5th	Leicester Thestrals	13th	Nottingham Nightmares		
6th	Liverpuddly Cannons	14th	Leeds Griffins		
7th	Chester Centurions	15th	York Horntails		
8th	Sheffield Squids	16th	Durhamstrang		

=== 2021/2022 ===
Due to COVID-19, the planned Northern Cup that would have taken place in November 2020 for the 2020/2021 season was cancelled. For the 2021/2022 season, the new format came in with only university teams competing and the tournament split into two different 1 day round-robin fixtures.

==== Northern 1 ====
The first fixture took place at the Salford Sports Village in Manchester on 8 November 2021. The tournament results were as follows:

===== Division 1 =====
Final standings
Placement	Team	W	L	Total Points Scored	Points From Goals	Snitch Catches
1st	Holyrood Hippogriffs	4	0	460	340	4
2nd	Leicester Thestrals	3	1	480	390	3
3rd	Liverpuddly Cannons	2	2	410	350	2
4th	Leeds Griffins	1	3	70	40	1
5th	Sheffield Squids	0	4	120	120	0

Sheffield Squids moved down to Division 2 for the second fixture.

Full Scores
Team 1	Score	Team 2	Game Length
Liverpuddly Cannons	120* - 10	Leeds Griffins	19:18
Holyrood Hippogriffs	100* - 30	Leicester Thestrals	20:31
Holyrood Hippogriffs	100* - 20	Sheffield Squids	20:07
Leicester Thestrals	140* - 0	Leeds Griffins	18:37
Liverpuddly Cannons	130* - 30	Sheffield Squids	18:20
Holyrood Hippogriffs	140* - 10	Leeds Griffins	18:58
Leicester Thestrals	150* - 40	Sheffield Squids	18:00
Liverpuddly Cannons	70 - 160*	Leicester Thestrals	18:00
Liverpuddly Cannons	90 - 120*	Holyrood Hippogriffs	26:36
Sheffield Squids	30 - 50*	Leeds Griffins	21:26

===== Division 2 =====
Final standings
Placement	Team	W	L	Total Points Scored	Points From Goals	Snitch Catches
1st	Manchester Manticores	4	0	420	390	1
2nd	Bangor Broken Broomsticks	3	1	560	500	2
3rd	Stirling Dumyat Dragons	2	2	370	310	2
4th	York Horntails	1	3	190	130	2
5th	Durhamstrang	0	4	220	130	3

Manchester Manticores moved up to Division 1 for the second fixture.

Full Scores
Team 1	Score	Team 2	Game Length
York Horntails	50* - 200	Bangor Broken Broomsticks	24:30
Durhamstrang	110* - 150	Stirling Dumyat Dragons	29:46
York Horntails	50 - 90*	Manchester Manticores	18:00
Manchester Manticores	100 - 50*	Durhamstrang	18:00
Bangor Broken Broomsticks	160* - 70	Stirling Dumyat Dragons	29:08
Manchester Manticores	90 - 60*	Stirling Dumyat Dragons	30:14
York Horntails	70* - 20	Durhamstrang	21:23
Bangor Broken Broomsticks	120 - 40*	Durhamstrang	23:51
York Horntails	20 - 90*	Stirling Dumyat Dragons	18:00
Bangor Broken Broomsticks	80* - 140	Manchester Manticores	28:30

==== Northern 2 ====
The second fixture was scheduled to take place in Edinburgh on 26 February 2022, however it was cancelled due to the venue deeming the pitches unplayable. Spots for the upcoming EQC and BQC tournaments would be based on the results of the Northern 1 fixture.

=== 2022/2023 ===
The first Northern fixture of the 2022/2023 season was on 12 November 2022 taking place in the North with the second fixture scheduled for 18 February 2023 taking place in either Scotland or the North East.

== Southern Cup ==
=== 2014 ===
The first Southern Cup was hosted by Southampton Quidditch Club on 8–9 November. 8 teams competed over the weekend. The first day consisted of two groups of 4 teams each while the second day was a knockout. By the end of the weekend Oxfords Radcliffe Chimeras claimed gold, Southampton silver and London Unspeakables 3rd. The full brackets and final standings where as follows:

==== Bracket Play ====
Quarter-finals
Oxford Radcliffe Chimeras	340
Norwich Nifflers	0
Reading Rocs	40
Falmouth Falcons	170*
Southampton QC	130*
Bristol Brizzlepuffs	0
London Unspeakables	70*
Oxford Quidlings	60

Semi-finals
Radcliffe Chimeras	210*
Falmouth Falcons	10
Southampton QC	170*
London Unspeakables	20

Final
Radcliffe Chimeras	140*
Southampton QC	30
Third place
Falmouth Falcons	40
London Unspeakables	50*

==== Final standings ====
Position	Team	Stage
1st	Oxford Radcliffe Chimeras	Final
2nd	Southampton Quidditch Club	Final
3rd	London Unspeakables	Semis
4th	Falmouth Falcons	Semis
5th-8th	Bristol Brizzlepuffs	Quarters
5th-8th	Oxford Quidlings	Quarters
5th-8th	Norwich Nifflers	Quarters
5th-8th	Reading Rocs	Quarters

=== 2015 ===
The second Southern Cup was held on 14 and 15 November at Horspath Athletics Track (oxford), was due to follow a similar structure to its northern counterpart. However, due to technical issues the Consolation bracket had to be cancelled. Seventeen teams competed over the weekend with Oxfords Radcliffe Chimeras eventually claiming Gold. the upper bracket results are as follows:

==== Bracket play ====
Quarter-finals
Oxford Radcliffe Chimeras	130
Southampton QC 2	50*
Brizzlebears	100*
Falmouth	90
Taxes QC	40
Warwick QC	130*
Southampton QC 1	110*
Werewolves of London	10

Semi-finals
Oxford Radcliffe Chimeras	90*
Brizzlebears	20
Warwick QC	80*
Southampton QC 1	30

Final
Oxford Radcliffe Chimeras	130*
Warwick QC	90
Third place
Southampton QC	100*
Brizzlebears	0

==== Final standings ====
Position	Team	Stage	Position	Team	Stage	Position	Team	Stage
1st	Oxford Radcliffe Chimeras	Final	9th	Swansea Seven Swans	Groups	17th	Exeter Patronums	Groups
2nd	Warwick QC	Final	10th	Reading Rocs	Groups			
3rd	Southampton QC firsts	Semis	11th	Cambridge University QC	Groups			
4th	BrizzleBears	Semis	12th	Oxford Quidlings	Groups			
5th	Falmouth Falcons	Quarters	13th	BrizzleBees	Groups			
6th	Werewolves of London	Quarters	14th	Norwich Nifflers	Groups			
7th	Southampton QC seconds	Quarters	15th	London Unspeakables	Groups			
8th	Taxes Quidditch	Quarters	16th	Portsmouth Horntail Strikers	Groups			

=== 2016 ===
The third Southern Cup took place on 29–30 October at Millbrook Rugby Club in Southampton. 17 teams competed over the weekend with the top 16 qualifying for the coming British Quidditch cup. The weekend followed a similar structure to last years with day one being group stage and day to single elimination knockout. Due to only 16 teams qualifying for BQC a play in match between the two lowest seed teams after day one was played to distinguish 16th and 17th place. by the end of the tournament Warwick QC had claimed gold, the full bracket results and final standings where as follows:

==== Upper bracket ====
Quarter-finals
Werewolves of London	180
Portsmouth	30*
BrizzleBears	140*
Swansea	40
Warwick QC	110*
Oxford Radcliffe Chimeras	30
London Unspeakables	110*^
Southampton QC Firsts	80

Semi-finals
Werewolves of London	130*
BrizzleBears	40
Warwick QC	110*
London Unspeakables	0

Final
Warwick QC	40*
Werewolves of London	20
Third place
BrizzleBears	110*
London Unspeakables	30

==== Consolation bracket ====
Play-in games
Oxford Quidlings	130*
The Flying Chaucers	60

Quarter-finals
Oxford Quidlings	50
Southampton QC Seconds	130*
Exeter Eagles	50
Cambridge University QC	170*
BrizzleBees	120*^
Reading Rocs	90
Norwich	0
Falmouth	160*

Semi-finals
Southampton QC Seconds	40
Exeter	110*
Falmouth	140
BrizzleBees	70*

Final
Exeter Eagles	70*
Falmouth	120^

==== Final standings ====
Position	Team	Stage	Position	Team	Stage	Position	Team	Stage
1st	Warwick QC	Final	9th	Falmouth Falcons	LB Final	17th	Flying Chaucers	LB play-ins
2nd	Werewolves of London	Final	10th	Exeter Eagles	LB Final			
3rd	BrizzleBears	Semis	11th	Southampton QC Seconds	LB Semis			
4th	London Unspeakables	Semis	12th	BrizzleBees	LB semis			
5th	Southampton QC Firsts	Quarters	13th	Oxford Quidlings	LB Quarters			
6th	Swansea Seven Swans	Quarters	14th	Cambridge University QC	LB Quarters			
7th	Oxford Radcliffe Chimeras	Quarters	15th	Reading Rocs	LB Quarters			
8th	Portsmouth	Quarters	16th	Norwich Nifflers	LB semis Quarters			

=== 2017 ===
The fourth Southern Cup took place on 11–12 November at Millbrook Rugby Club in Southampton. 21 teams competed over the weekend with the Top 15 qualifying for the coming British Quidditch cup. The weekend followed a similar structure to the format of previous years, with day one having group stage matches and day two containing single elimination playoffs. Due to only 15 teams qualifying for BQC, play in matches took place between the lowest seeded teams in the Lower Bracket to determine the teams that qualify. The tournament was won by Southampton QC Firsts. The full bracket results are as follows:

==== Upper bracket ====
Play-in games
Bristol Bees	20
Exeter Eagles	130*
Reading Knights	50
Portsmouth Strikers	70*

Quarter-finals
Werewolves of London	150
Exeter Eagles	30*
Warwick QC	70*
London Unspeakables	40
Southampton QC Firsts	130
Portsmouth Strikers	30*
Radcliffe Chimeras	40
Bristol Bears	70*

Semi-finals
Werewolves of London	90*
Warwick QC	50
Southampton QC Firsts	130*
Bristol Bears	10

Final
Southampton QC Firsts	140*
Werewolves of London	90
Third place
Warwick QC	120*
Bristol Bears	30

==== Consolation bracket ====
Play-in games
London Unbreakables	120*
Norwich Nifflers	70
Oxford Quidlings	W
The Flying Chaucers	FF
Bournemouth Banshees	W
Winchester Wampus	FF

Quarter-finals (BQC qualification)
Falmouth Falcons	W
London Unbreakables	FF
Bath QC	70*°
Cambridge University QC	90°°
Southampton QC Seconds	120
Oxford Quidlings	10
Swansea Swans	130*
Bournemouth Banshees	30

Semi-finals
Falmouth Falcons	160*
Cambridge University QC	40
Southampton QC Seconds	70*
Swansea Swans	20

Final
Falmouth Falcons	70*
Southampton QC Seconds	60

=== 2018 ===
The fifth Southern Cup took place on 24–25 November at Knole Academy in Sevenoaks, Kent. 18 teams competed over the weekend, with the top 14 qualifying for the upcoming British Quidditch Cup. Furthermore, the top 7 teams would qualify for EQT, the nationwide qualifying tournament for the European Quidditch Cup. On the first day, two groups of five and two groups of four played each other. Unlike Northern Cup, there was no consolation bracket. Instead, all 18 teams would compete in the upper bracket, with the bottom 4 teams participating in play-in games. The tournament was won by the Werewolves of London.

==== Upper bracket ====
Play-in games
Bristol Bears	190*
Cambridge Quidditch Club	70
London Unbreakables	140° (Note: The snitch survived for 45 minutes and thus the game was decided on quaffle points alone.)
Southampton Quidditch Club Seconds	190°

Round of 16
Werewolves of London	150*
Bristol Bears	0
Portsmouth Strikers	70*
Werewolves of London Seconds	130
London Unspeakables	190
Norwich Nifflers	70*
Exeter Eagles	120°°
Bath Quidditch Club	140**
London Quidditch Club	320*
Southampton Quidditch Club Seconds	0
Oxford Mammoths	140*
Oxford Radcliffe Chimeras	50
Warwick Quidditch Club	110*
Swansea Swans	40
Southampton Quidditch Club	170*
Bournemouth Banshees	0

Quarter-finals
Werewolves of London	160*
Werewolves of London Seconds	10
London Unspeakables	210*
Bath Quidditch Club	10
London Quidditch Club	150
Oxford Mammoths	30*
Warwick Quidditch Club	60
Southampton Quidditch Club	170*

Semi-finals
Werewolves of London	170*
London Unspeakables	20
London Quidditch Club	220*
Southampton Quidditch Club	0

Final
Werewolves of London	70*
London Quidditch Club	60
Third place
London Unspeakables	120*
Southampton Quidditch Club	90

==== EQT play-offs ====
EQT play-offs
Werewolves of London Seconds	160*
Bath Quidditch Club	30
Oxford Mammoths	230*
Warwick Quidditch Club	10

Fifth Place
Werewolves of London Seconds	30
Oxford Mammoths	120*
Seventh Place/EQT play-off
Bath Quidditch Club	110*
Warwick Quidditch Club	100

==== BQC play-offs ====
Of the 8 Round of 16 losers, the bottom 4 were chosen to face off for the final two BQC spots.

Swansea Swans	230*	20	Southampton Quidditch Club Seconds
Norwich Nifflers	90	180*	Bristol Bears

=== 2019 ===
The sixth Southern Cup took place on 9–10 November at the Harcout Hill Campus at Oxford Brookes University. Sixteen teams competed over the weekend. On the first day, 4 groups of four teams each played each other. At the end of this group stage, each team would play a team from a different group that was ranked at the same level. For example, the top ranked team of group A (London Unspeakables) played against the top ranked team of group B (Werewolves of London Firsts). Teams that won this play-off played a team from the rank above them who lost their first match and vice versa. The exception were the losers of lowest-ranked play-off (Bournemouth Banshees and Bristol Bears) and the winners of the highest-ranked play-off (Werewolves of London Firsts and London Quidditch Club A) who did not play a second match in this stage. This 'ranking' stage took place over the end of day 1 and start of day 2. The final 'play-in' stage consisted of four team brackets, with the teams playing a 'semi-final' then either a 'final' or 'consolation' match within their bracket. Thus the top bracket of 4 teams was playing for 1st - 4th, the second bracket was playing for 5th–8th and so on. The teams that finished the tournament in the upper brackets qualified to compete at the British Quidditch Cup in April 2020, however this tournament was later cancelled due to COVID-19. In addition, the team that won the tournament, Werewolves of London Firsts, was immediately eligible to attend European Quidditch Cup Division 1. Any teams that finished in the lower brackets were eligible to play at the Development Cup which was held in Salford Sports Village on 7–8 March 2020. The results of the tournament were as follows:

==== Group stage ====
===== Group A =====
Placement	Team	W	L
1st	London Unspeakables	3	0
2nd	Warwick Quidditch Club	2	1
3rd	Southsea Quidditch Club	1	2
4th	Bristol Bears	0	3

London Unspeakables	180* - 40	Southsea Quidditch Club
Warwick Quidditch Club	130* - 20	Bristol Bears
London Unspeakables	160 - 50*	Warwick Quidditch Club
Southsea Quidditch Club	190* - 30	Bristol Bears
London Unspeakables	250* - 10	Bristol Bears
Southsea Quidditch Club	10 - 60*	Warwick Quidditch Club

===== Group B =====
Placement	Team	W	L
1st	Werewolves of London Firsts	3	0
2nd	Bath Quidditch Club	2	1
3rd	London Unbreakables	1	2
4th	Oxford Radcliffe Chimeras	0	3

Werewolves of London Firsts	210* - 0	Bath Quidditch Club
Oxford Radcliffe Chimeras	120 - 150*	London Unbreakables
Werewolves of London Firsts	240* - 0	Oxford Radcliffe Chimeras
Bath Quidditch Club	170* - 40	London Unbreakables
Werewolves of London Firsts	290* - 10	London Unbreakables
Bath Quidditch Club	160* - 70	Oxford Radcliffe Chimeras

===== Group C =====
Placement	Team	W	L
1st	London Quidditch Club A	3	0
2nd	Werewolves of London Seconds	2	1
3rd	London Unstoppables	1	2
4th	Swansea Swans	0	3

London Quidditch Club A	190 - 70*	Werewolves of London Seconds
London Unstoppables	70* - 30	Swansea Swans
London Quidditch Club A	180* - 20	London Unstoppables
Werewolves of London Seconds	130* - 10	Swansea Swans
London Quidditch Club A	230* - 0	Swansea Swans
Werewolves of London Seconds	130* - 30	London Unstoppables

===== Group D =====
Placement	Team	W	L
1st	Oxford Mammoths	3	0
2nd	Southampton Quidditch Club	2	1
3rd	London Quidditch Club B	1	2
4th	Bournemouth Banshees	0	3

Southampton Quidditch Club	150* - 70	London Quidditch Club B
Oxford Mammoths	200* - 20	Bournemouth Banshees
Southampton Quidditch Club	100* - 130	Oxford Mammoths
London Quidditch Club B	190* - 70	Bournemouth Banshees
Southampton Quidditch Club	120* - 0	Bournemouth Banshees
Oxford Mammoths	160* - 30	London Quidditch Club B

==== Ranking Stage ====
===== Ranking Bracket 1 =====
Round 1			Round 2		
Match Number	Team	Score	Match Number	Team	Score
1	London Unspeakables	20	9	London Unspeakables	140
1	Werewolves of London Firsts	100*	9	Southampton Quidditch Club	70*
3	Werewolves of London Seconds	80	11	Werewolves of London Seconds	90
3	Southampton Quidditch Club	90*	11	Southsea Quidditch Club	120*
5	Southsea Quidditch Club	170*	13	London Unbreakables	0
5	London Unbreakables	20	13	Swansea Swans	90*
7	Swansea Swans	140*			
7	Bournemouth Banshees	10			

===== Ranking Bracket 2 =====
Round 1			Round 2		
Match Number	Team	Score	Match Number	Team	Score
2	London Quidditch Club A	150	10	Oxford Mammoths	70*
2	Oxford Mammoths	50*	10	Warwick Quidditch Club	20
4	Warwick Quidditch Club	60*	12	Bath Quidditch Club	0
4	Bath Quidditch Club	20	12	London Quidditch Club B	100*
6	London Unstoppables	40	14	London Unstoppables	120*
6	London Quidditch Club B	60*	14	Oxford Radcliffe Chimeras	50
8	Bristol Bears	90			
8	Oxford Radcliffe Chimeras	200*			

==== Play-in Stage ====
===== Bracket 1 (1st - 4th) =====
Play-in
Werewolves of London Firsts	150*
Oxford Mammoths	40
London Quidditch Club A	70
London Unspeakables	90*

Final
Werewolves of London Firsts	160°°
London Unspeakables	120*°
3rd-place play-off
Oxford Mammoths	10
London Quidditch Club A	160*

===== Bracket 2 (5th–8th) =====
Play-in
Southampton Quidditch Club	90°*
London Quidditch Club B	60*°
Warwick Quidditch Club	30
Southsea Quidditch Club	60*

5th-place play-off
Southampton Quidditch Club	170*
Southsea Quidditch Club	70
7th-place play-off
London Quidditch Club B	140*
Warwick Quidditch Club	80

===== Bracket 3 (9th–12th) =====
Play-in
Werewolves of London Seconds	160*
London Unstoppables	60
Bath Quidditch Club	70
Swansea Swans	130*

9th-place play-off
Werewolves of London Seconds	150*
Swansea Swans	0
11th-place play-off
London Unstoppables	170*
Bath Quidditch Club	50

===== Bracket 4 (13th–16th) =====
Play-in
London Unbreakables	70
Bristol Bears	170*
Oxford Radcliffe Chimeras	40
Bournemouth Banshees	110*

13th-place play-off
Bristol Bears	100
Bournemouth Banshees	120*
15th-place play-off
London Unbreakables	80
Oxford Radcliffe Chimeras	170*

==== Final standings ====
Position	Team	Position	Team
1st	Werewolves of London Firsts	9th	Werewolves of London Seconds
2nd	London Unspeakables	10th	Swansea Swans
3rd	London Quidditch Club A	11th	London Unstoppables
4th	Oxford Mammoths	12th	Bath Quidditch Club
5th	Southampton Quidditch Club	13th	Bournemouth Banshees
6th	Southsea Quidditch Club	14th	Bristol Bears
7th	London Quidditch Club B	15th	Oxford Radcliffe Chimeras
8th	Warwick Quidditch Club	16th	London Unbreakables

=== 2021/2022 ===
Due to COVID-19, the planned Southern Cup that would have taken place in November 2020 for the 2020/2021 season was cancelled. For the 2021/2022 season, the new format came in with only university teams competing and the tournament split into two different 1 day round-robin fixtures.

==== Southern 1 ====
The first fixture took place on 20 November 2021 at the King's House Sports Ground in London. As only five teams were competing, only one division was used. The fixture results were as follows:

Placement	Team	W	L	QPD (Note: Quaffle Point Difference - point differential between teams ignoring the 30 points from snitch catch. For example Warwick (110) had an 80 QPD against Bristol (60*) in their game, and Bristol had a -80 QPD against Warwick.)	QPD - C (Note: Quaffle Point Difference Capped - QPD but capped to a maximum of 90 points/minimum of -90 points.)	Snitch Catches
1st	Southampton Quidditch Club	4	0	340	270	3
2nd	Warwick Quidditch Club	3	1	120	120	2
3rd	Exeter Eagles	1	3	-50	-50	2
4th	Oxford Universities Quidditch Club (Radcliffe Chimeras)	1	3	-90	-70	2
5th	Bristol Bears	0	4	-320	-270	1

Team 1	Score	Team 2	Game Length
Warwick Quidditch Club	110 - 60*	Bristol Bears	18:00
Southampton Quidditch Club	110* - 50	Exeter Eagles	19:13
Warwick Quidditch Club	180* - 110	Oxford Universities Quidditch Club	33:31
Southampton Quidditch Club	220 - 110*	Oxford Universities Quidditch Club	41:23 (OT)
Bristol Bears	60 - 140*	Exeter Eagles	29:28
Warwick Quidditch Club	100* - 10	Exeter Eagles	18:18
Bristol Bears	20 - 100*	Oxford Universities Quidditch Club	22:57
Southampton Quidditch Club	180* - 70	Bristol Bears	18:00
Oxford Universities Quidditch Club	90 - 110*	Exeter Eagles	18:00
Southampton Quidditch Club	110* - 20	Warwick Quidditch Club	18:00

==== Southern 2 ====
The second fixture was originally scheduled to take place on 20 February 2022 at the Cardiff City House of Sport in Cardiff, however it was postponed due to storm damage to the venue and instead took place on 12 March at the same location. The fixture results were as follows:

Placement	Team	W	L	QPD	QPD - C	Snitch Catches
1st	Southampton Quidditch Club	4	0	230	220	3
2nd	Exeter Eagles	3	1	190	190	1
3rd	Oxford Universities Quidditch Club (Radcliffe Chimeras)	2	2	-30	-30	3
4th	Warwick Quidditch Club	1	3	-160	-150	2
5th	Bristol Bears	0	4	-230	-230	1

Team 1	Score	Team 2	Game Length
Southampton Quidditch Club	130* - 20	Bristol Bears	20:30
Warwick Quidditch Club	100* - 130	Exeter Eagles	23:17 (OT)
Warwick Quidditch Club	90* - 110	Oxford Universities Quidditch Club	28:23 (OT)
Southampton Quidditch Club	160* - 30	Warwick Quidditch Club	26:05
Exeter Eagles	130* - 30	Bristol Bears	19:56
Southampton Quidditch Club	100 - 90*	Oxford Universities Quidditch Club	18:15
Warwick Quidditch Club	100 - 80*	Bristol Bears	19:28
Southampton Quidditch Club	130* - 90	Exeter Eagles	22:04
Exeter Eagles	100 - 60*	Oxford Universities Quidditch Club	18:00
Oxford Universities Quidditch Club	110* - 50	Bristol Bears	23:49

=== 2022/2023 ===
The first Southern fixture of the 2022/2023 season is scheduled for 5 November 2022 taking place in the South West with the second fixture scheduled for 11 February 2023 taking place in the South.

== Community League ==
The Community League was started in 2021 after the Northern and Southern Cups were made into tournaments only for university quidditch teams. It acts as an

Community League
Tournament information
- Established: 2021
- Administrator: QuidditchUK
- Format: Round-Robin
- Participants: 14 (in 2022)
- Number of events: 3
- Website: QuidditchUK website

Current champion
- London Quidditch Club A

Fixture 1
- Dates: July

Fixture 2
- Dates: August

Fixture 3
- Dates: September

equivalent tournament for community teams. The format is the same as the updated Northern and Southern format, with teams divided into divisions of around 5 teams each that compete at multiple one day round-robin fixtures in a season. The relegation and promotion system is also the same with teams that place last in a fixture being relegated to a lower division and teams that place first being promoted to a higher one. The Community League has three fixtures per season (compared with the two fixtures per season for Northern and Southern) and final rankings after all fixtures are used to determine seedings and qualification for the British Quidditch Cup and European Qualifier Tournament.

=== 2021/2022 Season ===
==== Fixture 1 ====
The debut fixture of the Community League was planned to take place on 14 August 2021, however in June the decision was made to cancel this fixture to allow teams more time to prepare for full-contact games after social distancing regulations due to COVID-19 were relaxed. On 4 September, the first fixture was attended by 9 teams and took place at the Derby Rugby Football Club in Derby. Due to a number of teams being unable to attend, this fixture was decided beforehand to have no effect on the rest of the competitive season. For example, there would be no promotions or relegations between divisions based on the tournament and the results would not be used for seedings for the British Quidditch Cup or European Qualifier Tournament. In addition, the originally planned three divisions was reduced to two based on the attendance numbers. The full results were as follows:

Locations of the Community League fixtures

===== Division 1 =====
Placement	Team	W	L
1st	Velociraptors	4	0
2nd	Werewolves of London Firsts	3	1
3rd	London Quidditch Club A	2	2
4th	London Unspeakables	1	3
5th	Olympians Quidditch Club	0	4

Team 1	Score	Team 2	Game Length
Werewolves of London Firsts	130* - 80	Olympians Quidditch Club	20:31
Velociraptors	110 - 70*	London Quidditch Club A	18:26
Velociraptors	130* - 40	London Unspeakables	18:52
Werewolves of London Firsts	140* - 40	London Unspeakables	20:33
London Quidditch Club A	210* - 140	Olympians Quidditch Club	29:24
Velociraptors	120* - 50	Olympians Quidditch Club	19:15
London Quidditch Club A	110* - 30	London Unspeakables	18:37
Werewolves of London Firsts	140 - 90*	London Quidditch Club A	27:23 (OT)
London Unspeakables	130* - 120	Olympians Quidditch Club	18:00
Velociraptors	140* - 100	Werewolves of London Firsts	26:24

===== Division 2 =====
Placement	Team	W	L
1st	Southsea Quidditch	3	0
2nd	West Country Rebels	2	1
3rd	East Midlands Vipers	1	2
4th	Kelpies Quidditch Club	0	3

Team 1	Score	Team 2	Game Length
Southsea Quidditch	150* - 10	West Country Rebels	20:01
Kelpies Quidditch Club	70* - 100	East Midlands Vipers	18:54
Southsea Quidditch	170* - 120	Kelpies Quidditch Club	
West Country Rebels	80* - 50	East Midlands Vipers	
Southsea Quidditch	110 - 60*	East Midlands Vipers	21:03 (OT)
West Country Rebels	110 - 90*	Kelpies Quidditch Club	27:28 (OT)

==== Fixture 2 ====
A second fixture took place on 9 October 2021 at King's House Sports Ground in London and was attended by 12 teams. The originally planned three divisions were used at this tournament with 4 teams in each, teams competed in a round-robin before doing play-offs for 1st / 2nd place and 3rd / 4th place within each division to determine the final rankings.

The full results were as follows:

===== Division 1 =====
Placement	Team
1st	Werewolves of London Firsts
2nd	London Quidditch Club A
3rd	Velociraptors
4th	London Unspeakables

Match	Team 1	Score	Team 2	Game Length
Round-robin	London Quidditch Club A	30 - 80*	Werewolves of London Firsts	18:10
Round-robin	Velociraptors	120* - 40	London Unspeakables	19:38
Round-robin	London Unspeakables	50 - 140*	Werewolves of London Firsts	20:22
Round-robin	Velociraptors	30 - 140*	London Quidditch Club A	19:25
Round-robin	London Unspeakables	80* - 140	London Quidditch Club A	29:22 (OT)
Round-robin	Velociraptors	180* - 160	Werewolves of London Firsts	29:41 (OT)
3rd / 4th play-off	Velociraptors	140* - 10	London Unspeakables	20:08
1st / 2nd play-off	London Quidditch Club A	70 - 140*	Werewolves of London Firsts	18:20

===== Division 2 =====
Placement	Team
1st	Olympians Quidditch Club
2nd	Oxford Mammoths
3rd	Southsea Quidditch
4th	London Quidditch Club B

Match	Team 1	Score	Team 2	Game Length
Round-robin	Olympians Quidditch Club	110* - 40	Southsea Quidditch	18:47
Round-robin	Oxford Mammoths	120 - 60*	London Quidditch Club B	26:52 (OT)
Round-robin	London Quidditch Club B	60 - 160*	Southsea Quidditch	24:08
Round-robin	Oxford Mammoths	30 - 130*	Olympians Quidditch Club	19:29
Round-robin	Oxford Mammoths	90* - 70	Southsea Quidditch	21:55
Round-robin	Olympians Quidditch Club	150* - 20	London Quidditch Club B	18:28
3rd / 4th play-off	Southsea Quidditch	150* - 20	London Quidditch Club B	23:40
1st / 2nd play-off	Olympians Quidditch Club	110 - 40	Oxford Mammoths	21:17 (OT)

===== Division 3 =====
Placement	Team
1st	Werewolves of London Seconds
2nd	West Country Rebels
3rd	East Midlands Vipers
4th	London Unbreakables

Match	Team 1	Score	Team 2	Game Length
Round-robin	London Unbreakables	30* - 100	West Country Rebels	
Round-robin	East Midlands Vipers	10 - 110*	Werewolves of London Seconds	18:10
Round-robin	East Midlands Vipers	70* - 100	West Country Rebels	28:03 (OT)
Round-robin	London Unbreakables	30* - 220	Werewolves of London Seconds	26:57
Round-robin	Werewolves of London Seconds	80 - 60*	West Country Rebels	
Round-robin	East Midlands Vipers	140 - 50*	London Unbreakables	18:44
3rd / 4th play-off	East Midlands Vipers	160* - 20	London Unbreakables	18:00
1st / 2nd play-off	Werewolves of London Seconds	130* - 40	West Country Rebels	22:47

=== 2022/2023 Season ===
==== Fixture 1 ====
The first Community League fixture of the season took place on 2 July 2022 at the All Hallows RC High School in Manchester with 10 teams competing in a round-robin over 3 divisions. The fixture was originally scheduled to take place at the Salford Sports Village however due to a COVID outbreak at the venue the location was changed the day before the event.

The full results were as follows (teams in italics did not attend the fixture):

===== Division 1 =====
Placement	Team
1st	Werewolves of London Firsts
2nd	Olympians Quidditch Club
3rd	Velociraptors
4th	London Quidditch Club
5th	London Unspeakables (Relegated)

Team 1	Score	Team 2	Game Length
Werewolves of London Firsts	130* - 120	Olympians Quidditch Club	29:58
Velociraptors	30 -120*	Werewolves of London Firsts	20:11
Olympians Quidditch Club	110* - 90	Velociraptors	21:32

===== Division 2 =====
Placement	Team
1st	Werewolves of London Seconds (Promoted)
2nd	Southsea Quidditch
3rd	Oxford Mammoths
4th	Kelpies Quidditch Club
5th	East Midlands Vipers (Relegated)

Team 1	Score	Team 2	Game Length
Oxford Mammoths	120 - 40*	Kelpies Quidditch Club	26:01
Werewolves of London Seconds	120* - 110	Southsea Quidditch	22:12
Southsea Quidditch	140 - 100*	Kelpies Quidditch Club	28:31 (OT)
Oxford Mammoths	80* - 130	Werewolves of London Seconds	22:35 (OT)
Oxford Mammoths	60 - 120*	Southsea Quidditch	21:55
Kelpies Quidditch Club	30 - 120*	Werewolves of London Seconds	20:40

===== Division 3 =====
Placement	Team
1st	Phoenix Quidditch (Promoted)
2nd	Prometheans (Olympians Seconds)
3rd	West Country Rebels
4th	Birmingham Badgers

Team 1	Score	Team 2	Game Length
West Country Rebels	50 - 170*	Phoenix Quidditch	31:49
Prometheans	10 - 90*	Phoenix Quidditch	20:38
West Country Rebels	40 - 170*	Prometheans	22:37

==== Fixture 2 ====
The second fixture took place on 13 August 2022 at the Derby Rugby Football Club in Derby with 13 teams competing over 3 divisions. Due to extreme heat the event utilised the new IQA recommendations for water breaks. The event also coincided with a national rail strike on the same day.

The full results were as follows:

===== Division 1 =====
Placement	Team
1st	Werewolves of London Firsts
2nd	London Quidditch Club A
3rd	Olympians Quidditch Club
4th	Werewolves of London Seconds
5th	Velociraptors (Relegated)

Team 1	Score	Team 2	Game Length
Olympians Quidditch Club	150* - 50	Velociraptors	21:49
Werewolves of London Firsts	170* - 20	Werewolves of London Seconds	22:00
Velociraptors	80* - 150	London Quidditch Club A	29:00 (OT)
Werewolves of London Firsts	120* - 40	London Quidditch Club A	20:55
Werewolves of London Seconds	70 - 160*	Olympians Quidditch Club	24:07
Velociraptors	100 - 120*	Werewolves of London Seconds	28:51
London Quidditch Club A	110 - 100*	Olympians Quidditch Club	28:36 (OT)
Werewolves of London Firsts	100* - 40	Olympians Quidditch Club	20:15
Werewolves of London Firsts	120* - 0	Velociraptors	Abandoned
London Quidditch Club A	210* - 50	Werewolves of London Seconds	20:33

===== Division 2 =====
Placement	Team
1st	Phoenix Quidditch (Promoted)
2nd	Southsea Quidditch
3rd	Kelpies Quidditch Club
4th	Oxford Mammoths

===== Division 3 =====
Placement	Team
1st	Prometheans (Olympians Seconds) (Promoted)
2nd	London Quidditch Club B
3rd	East Midlands Vipers
4th	West Country Rebels

==== Fixture 3 ====
The third and final Community League fixture of the season took place on 17 September 2022 at the Farnham Common Sports Club in Slough with 14 teams competing over 3 divisions.

===== Division 1 =====
Placement	Team
1st	London Quidditch Club A
2nd	Werewolves of London Firsts
3rd	Olympians Quidditch Club
4th	Werewolves of London Seconds
5th	Phoenix Quidditch (Relegated)

===== Division 2 =====
Placement	Team
1st	Velociraptors (Promoted)
2nd	Southsea Quidditch
3rd	Prometheans (Olympians Seconds)
4th	Oxford Mammoths
5th	Kelpies Quidditch Club (Relegated)

===== Division 3 =====
Placement	Team
1st	London Quidditch Club B (Promoted)
2nd	West Country Rebels
3rd	East Midlands Vipers
4th	Werewolves of London Thirds

== See also ==
- International Quidditch Association
- Quidditch (real-life sport)
