= EQC (disambiguation) =

EQC may refer to:

== Government ==
- Earthquake Commission of New Zealand
- Evaluation Quality Control of the European Union's Copernicus Climate Change Service (C3S)
- Environmental Quality Council, a part of the Wyoming Department of Environmental Quality

== Sports and games ==
- European Quizzing Championships
- European Quidditch Cup

== Other uses ==
- Equity Commonwealth (NYSE ticker symbol: EQC), a company founded by Sam Zell
- Ecuatorial Cargo (ICAO airline code: EQC) see List of defunct airlines of Equatorial Guinea
- Mercedes-Benz EQC, all-electric car

== See also ==
- EQC-6, an airplane, see Waco Custom Cabin series
