= Oxford Universities Quadball Club =

Quidditch club in Oxford

- The logo of Oxford Universities Quadball Club
- Full name: Oxford Universities Quadball Club
- Nickname: Radcliffe Chimeras
- Short name: OUQC
- Sport: Quadball
- Founded: 20 November 2011
- Based in: Oxford
- Home ground: University Parks, Oxford
- Colours: Dark blue and white
- President: Ben Naylor
- Head coach: Thomas Ng
- Captain: Rowan Harrison-Walker
- National championships: Three Time British Quadball Cup Winner
- Championships: 3 Regional, 3 British and 1 European
- Mascot: A chimera and an owl
- Website: ouqc.co.uk

Oxford Universities Quadball Club (OUQC) is the quadball (formerly quidditch) club of both the University of Oxford and Oxford Brookes University. It is composed of two teams: a first team, the Radcliffe Chimeras, and a reserve second team, the Quidlings. Both teams are official QuadballUK (QUK) teams. QUK is the UK quidditch governing body, and is a constituent part of the International Quadball Association (IQA).

The club was formed as Oxford Quidditch on 20 November 2011 and adopted the name Oxford Universities Quidditch Club in 2013, then changing to its current name as the sport itself changed from quidditch to quadball in 2022. The club has seen much success, with the Radcliffe Chimeras a substantial amount of national and international titles. These include the first annual British Quidditch Cup (BQC), and the European Quidditch Cup, in late 2013 and early 2014, as well as BQC in 2016. More recently the club came first in the 2025 British Quadball Cup (on the university side), seeing their first major tournament win since the 2020 Development Cup.

Both teams have previously competed in the season-long competition organised by QuidditchUK called The Challenge Shield, the first matches of were played in September 2014.

The club played in Worcester College for six months, before moving to a permanent marked out field in Oxford's University Parks in May 2012. Currently, they play instead on temporary pitches, still in University Parks.

== OUQC Success ==
Date	Tournament Name	Location	Finals Score	Runner up
November 2013	BQC	Oxford	110 - 60*	Keele Squirrels
November 2014	Southern Cup	Southampton	140* - 30	Southampton QC
March 2015	BQC	Nottingham	90 - 120*	Oxford, lost to Southampton QC
November 2015	Southern Cup	Oxford	130* - 90	Warwick QC
March 2016	BQC	Rugeley	150* - 50	Warwick QC
March 2020	Development Cup	Salford	130* - 70	London Unspeakables
February 2025	Southern 2	Chigwell	N/A (Round Robin Format)	N/A
May 2025	BQC	Keele	130* - 50	Holyrood Hippogriffs
April 2026	BUQC	Keele	260* - 260	Cambridge Chronophages

== History ==
=== Early days ===
The first incarnation of Oxford University's muggle quidditch team came into being on 20 November 2011. Angus Barry organised a match between Worcester College and St Edmund Hall held in the extensive grounds of Worcester. Rules were loose and almost non-existent, with St Edmund Hall winning the majority of games played. Following complaints from the groundsmen of Worcester College, play quickly moved from Worcester College to the University Parks. Other colleges (notably at that point University College and Mansfield College) also joined the emerging group of teams within the university. The standard rulebook of the International Quidditch Association was officially adopted during the Trinity (summer) term of 2012.

After the Global Games were held in Oxford in 2012, Oxford organised its first match against another university, defeating Reading in a home fixture on 24 November 2012. A few months later, Oxford played Leicester in another home fixture in University Parks, and won all three matches played by scores of 90-40*, 60-40*, and 120*-40. This was followed by Oxford's first tournament success, claiming the Highlander Cup in March 2013 after winning against Bangor in near-unplayable weather conditions in Edinburgh.

=== A new order and the first British Champions ===
The Whiteknights Tournament in Reading saw the Radcliffe Chimeras take first place, whilst the Quidlings struggled, finishing last. Along with the adoption of a two-team structure, the executive committee structure was also changed, with Ashley Cooper taking over from founder Angus Barry as captain of the Radcliffe Chimeras, as well as being installed as the club's first president.

This change was followed by the inaugural British Quidditch Cup in November 2013. Hosted in Oxford, at the University Parks, the British Quidditch Cup was the first national championship within the United Kingdom, and sixteen teams, including the Radcliffe Chimeras and the Quidlings, took part. After a successful recruitment drive at the start of the academic year, the Quidlings, despite an early loss to the Leicester Lovegoods, defeated the Norwich Nifflers and the Chester Chasers to reach the quarter-finals of the Cup, only for them to be knocked out of the tournament 100*-0 by Southampton. Southampton were themselves beaten in the semi-finals by the Radcliffe Chimeras, with a final score of 110*-0 (with the asterisk denoting the snitch catch), after finishing top of their group, going on to become the first British Champions after beating Keele University in the final with a score of 110–60*.

=== International success and building for the future ===
On 1 and 2 February 2014, the two teams of Oxford University Quidditch Club played their first international matches. Travelling to Brussels to take part in the 2014 European Quidditch Cup, they hoped to make their mark on the world of international quidditch. The Quidlings won two of their three group games, almost snatching a space at the IQA World Cup, before losing out to Brundisi Lunatica in the play-off match. However, the Chimeras lived up to their now extensive reputation, only losing one game (against Paris Frog) on their way to a final against Paris Phénix. Although losing their Keeper, Luke Twist, to a red card in the last few minutes of the match after he'd made important contributions to their leading scoreline at that point, the Chimeras powered on to defeat Paris 100*-30 with a spectacular snitch grab from volunteer seeker Steffan Danino, claiming the title of European Champions. Returning from their exploits on the continent, the club set about hosting a mercenary tournament, the Valentines Cup, in South Park, Oxford. This took place on 22 and 23 February, and was the largest tournament of this nature to take place outside of the United States, with over 160 players taking part. The organisers of the event, Luke Twist and Jasiek Mikolajczak, were later nominated as Radcliffe Chimeras captain and President respectively, following the announcement that Ashley Cooper would not be continuing his time as president or captain. The Quidlings captaincy was taken over by Jack Lennard.

Nine OUQC players were included in the squad of twenty-one that represented the United Kingdom at the 2014 Global Games in Vancouver, British Columbia, Canada. In 2016, the Chimeras regained their national champion placing in the British Quidditch Cup, held 19–20 March.

=== Renewed success: the 2024-25 season ===
In the 2024-25 season, Oxford was coached by Luckeciano Melo, had president Maria Mahony, and was captained by Russell Bartram.

OUQC played in both southern cups, as well as the British Quadball Cup (BQC), and had their most successful season in recent times. In their first tournament of the year in November 2024, after having a great recruitment season to see a squad filled with several promising newcomers to the sport, they placed joint second in the Southern Development Cup, hosted by Warwick, after losing a hard-fought game against Warwick QC, in which Oxford managed to catch the flag but unfortunately their goal deficit was too large to make up. Warwick were their rivals in recent years, so the team looked promising for the year ahead.

In January, the team suffered two unfortunate injuries, a broken finger and a broken collarbone, each for a beater, putting both players out of the tournament, and resulting in difficult roster implications. Luckily, a small number of Cambridge students, one of whom had previously played for Oxford, agreed to play for OUQC as well, making sure Oxford had the numbers to play. So, in February, they still managed to place first in the Southern Cup in Chigwell, going undefeated, including against Warwick after a comeback result. A flag catch from OUQC from behind put them in a closer match, yet still behind a few points. The similarity to the game they played in Southern Dev also gave Oxford a reason to be worried, but they managed to keep their heads, and the flag catch put momentum on their side. They then scored a few crucial goals, with Warwick struggling to match them, and finally the two teams were in a next-goal-wins situation. With a missed goal from each side keeping the crowd and live viewers on the edge of their seats, OUQC finally scored a winning goal, enabling them to go on to win the tournament. Having not won a tournament of this level for a few years, this felt like the year to change OUQC's fortunes and potentially have the chance to go far in the biggest tournament of the year: BQC.

== Early Results ==
=== Radcliffe Chimeras ===
(including results from before the formation of the two-team system)

Date	Tournament name	Teams played	Result
24 November 2012	Best-of-3	Reading Rocs	Won
23 February 2013	Best-of-3	Leicester Lovegoods	Won
16 Mar 2013 – 17 Mar 2013	Highlander Cup, Edinburgh	Holyrood Hippogriffs, Avada Keeledavra, Bangor Broken Broomsticks, St Andrews Snidgets	First
16 May 2013	Single match	Nottingham Nightmares	Won
26 May 2013	Single match	London Unspeakables	Won
24 Jun 2013 – 25 Jun 2013	Whiteknights Tournament	Bangor Broken Broomsticks, Reading Rocs, Southampton Quidditch, Oxford Quidlings	First
9 Nov 2013 – 10 Nov 2013	BQC	Nottingham Nightmares, London Unspeakables, Derby Quidditch, Leeds, Southampton Quidditch, Avada Keeledavra	First
1 Feb 2014 – 2 Feb 2014	European Quidditch Cup	Paris Frog, Paris Phénix; Lille Black Snitches, Barcelona Eagles, Belgian Qwaffles, Paris Frog	First
27 April 2014	Roxdon	Reading Rocs, London Unspeakables	Won both
3 May 2014	Single match	Bangor Broken Broomsticks	Won
10 May 2014	The Almighty Battle	Southampton Quidditch Club, Loughborough Longshots	Won all matches

=== Quidlings ===
Date	Tournament name	Teams played	Result
24 Jun 2013 – 25 Jun 2013	Whiteknights Tournament	Bangor Broken Broomsticks, Reading Rocs, Southampton, Radcliffe Chimeras	Fifth
9 Nov 2013 – 10 Nov 2013	BQC	Leicester Lovegoods, Norwich Nargles, Chester Chasers, Southampton Quidditch	Quarter-finalists
1 Feb 2014 – 2 Feb 2014	European Quidditch Cup	Brindisi Lunatica, Antwerpen Beerters, Milano Meneghins, Nantes Quidditch, Paris Frog	Ninth
27 April 2014	Roxdon	Reading Rocs, London Unspeakables	Won both
3 May 2014	Single match	Bangor Broken Broomsticks	Won
