= QuadballUK =

Governing body of quadball in the UK

- Abbreviation: QUK
- Formation: 2011
- Legal status: Non-Profit Organisation
- Location: United Kingdom
- Directors: Matt Bateman & Gio Forino
- Website: quadballuk.org

QuadballUK (formerly QuidditchUK) is the official governing body of quadball in the United Kingdom and is affiliated with the International Quadball Association.

It began in 2011 as a Facebook group intended to act as a network for quidditch teams and players within the UK to communicate with each other, become aware of local teams and resources, and set up matches and new teams. In July 2022 QUK made a statement saying they plan to rebrand with the new name Quadball later in 2022. The rebrand was completed in October 2022.

== History and internal structure ==
Since its foundation, QuadballUK has become vastly developing organisation as, after hosting the Summer Games in August 2012, there was a massive growth of quadball teams throughout the country. It was at this point that QuadballUK advanced from a network for UK teams and players, to become an established governing body of quadball in the UK.

A staffing structure was set up whose aim would be to develop and promote quadball in the United Kingdom. Its current Directors are Matt Bateman and Gio Forino, and the Assistant Director is Izzy Brown.

The staff of QUK is currently composed of volunteers within the quadball community. In May 2022, the role of QuadballUK president was changed from a volunteer role into a paid position paying an annual salary of £5,000.

== Events ==
=== Current competitive events and structure ===
Currently QUK runs 6 major tournaments: the regional university Northern and Southern Cups, British Quidditch Cup, Development Cup, European Qualifier Tournament and the Community League. The two university regionals and the Community League are used to qualify teams for the British Quidditch Cup with teams that fail to qualify instead eligible to compete at the Development Cup.

Northern and Southern Cups (for university teams) and the UK-wide Community League (for community teams) are run as multiple 1 day fixtures over the season with teams divided into divisions of around 5 teams each that compete in a round-robin at each fixture. At the end of each fixture, the top team in each division is promoted to the division above and the bottom team in each division is relegated to the division below.

The top 12 community teams and top 12 university teams after all fixtures qualify for British Quidditch Cup where they compete in separate university and community flights. The 12 university places are distributed proportionately between the Northern and the Southern regions based on the number of teams competing in each.

The Development Cup allows any team that does not qualify for BQC to compete, with its main aim being to allow teams with little competitive experience the opportunity to play other teams of a similar level competitively. The first Development Cup encouraged experienced coaches to coach an attending team for the weekend in order to help them develop as a team.

The European Qualifier Tournament is an opt-in tournament that is used to determine qualification for teams to represent the UK at European Quadball Cup in Divisions 1 and 2 (based on the team's overall performance). Both community and university teams can attend with a maximum number of 20 teams. Rankings at the university regionals and Community League fixtures are used to determine attendance priority if more than this number of teams apply to compete.

=== Previous competitive structure ===
The first British Quidditch Cup (BQC) was held on 9–10 November 2013, at University Parks in Oxford, England with 16 teams competing. The host team, Oxford's Radcliffe Chimeras, won the trophy, beating Avada Keeledavra in the final with Bangor's Broken Broomsticks placing third. The second BQC was held at Wollaton Hall and Deer Park, Nottingham on 7–8 March 2015 and was won by Southampton Quidditch Club 1.

QuadballUK operated a "Challenge Shield" league event which ran 2014–2015. This competitive format was phased out in 2015 in favour of two regional competitions.

From 2015 until 2019, QuadballUK ran the Northern and Southern Cups regional tournaments as singular 2 day fixtures at the start of the season which were open to any team that applied to play. The format consisted of round-robin group play on the first day followed by 2 knockout tournaments on the second day, with the top 2 teams from each group competing in a "champions" bracket and the rest playing in a "consolidation" bracket. The 2019 tournaments had a slightly different structure which removed the full knockout tournaments in favour of a "ranking bracket" stage followed by a "play-in" stage. The tournaments were used for qualify teams for EQC (spots were distributed equally between the two regions) and the British Quidditch Cup (spots were distributed proportionately to the number of teams competing in the region), with seeding for BQC also being based on the results of the tournaments.

The Development Cup was first introduced in 2017 with the first tournament being won by Liverpool's "Liverpuddly Cannons".

At the end of the season, the British Quidditch Cup was run as a 32 team tournament with the top teams as decided by regionals invited to compete. On day one of the tournament the teams were split into 8 groups of 4 where they would compete in a round robin. Day 2 followed the same "champions bracket"/ "consolation bracket" knockout structure seen in Northern and Southern Cups. BQC's final standings were used to rank all teams in attendance alongside seeding next season's regionals.

In 2021, QUK introduced the current season format which includes a split between university and community teams (previously all teams competed in the same events). The new UK-wide Community League was formed as an equivalent tournament for community teams to the new university-only Northern and Southern Cups. The British Quadball Cup was changed to its current state as a 24 team tournament, with 12 university and 12 community teams competing in separate flights.

== Teams ==
These are the teams involved with UK Quidditch listed as they appear in QuadballUK's team directory as of 2022:

=== Current Teams ===
==== University Teams ====
- Bangor Broken Broomsticks
- Bournemouth Banshees Quadball Club
- Bristol Quadball Club
- Cambridge Quadball Club
- Cardiff University Quadball Club
- Durhamstrang University Quadball Club
- Exeter Eagles
- Glasgow Grim Reapers
- Holyrood Hippogriffs
- Kent Quadball Club
- Leeds Griffins
- Leicester Thestrals
- Manchester Universities Quadball Club
- Oxford University Quidditch Club
- Sheffield Quadball Club
- Southampton Quadball Club
- Stirling University Dumyat Dragons Quadball
- Swansea Swans
- Warwick Quadball Club
- York Horntails Quadball Club

==== Community Teams ====
- Birmingham Badgers
- East Midlands Vipers
- Kelpies Quadball Club
- London Quadball Club
- London Unspeakables Quadball
- Olympians Quadball Club
- Oxford Mammoths
- Phoenix Quadball Clapham
- Southsea Quadball
- Velociraptors Quadball Club
- Werewolves of London
- West Country Rebels

=== Inactive teams ===
Inactive teams that have previously been involved with QuadballUK:

- Bath Quidditch Club
- Chester Centurions
- Derby Daemons
- Galway Grindylows
- Kinlochleven Midges
- Loughborough Longshots
- Northern Lights Quidditch Club
- Northumbria Ridgebacks
- Norwich Nifflers
- Portsmouth Horntail Strikers
- Reading Knights
- Surrey Stags
- Tornadoes Quidditch Club
- Tremough Quidditch Club (Falmouth Falcons)
- UCLAN Quidditch Club (Preston Poltergeists)

== European competition ==
The first international club level fixture took place in Brussels, February 2014 when both Oxford University teams were invited to play in the European Quidditch Cup (then known as the European Regional Championships), Oxford's first team "the Radcliffe Chimeras" came 1st. In the following years, more teams where invited to the European Quidditch Cup. In 2015 the UK hosted EQC, originally the UK were supposed to send 6 teams but due to dropouts 10 teams were sent to replace those missing. In 2016 the UK sent 8 teams to Italy, 7 out of 8 came finished in the upper bracket while the other team didn't lose a match on day 2. 2017 saw 6 teams compete in Belgium. 2018 saw 4 teams compete in Bamberg in Germany.

The 2016/2017 and 2017/2018 seasons saw teams compete for EQC spots with half the spots given to the top teams in the north and the other half given to the top teams in the south.

The 2018/2019 season onwards saw top-teams from the South and North compete for 12 spots in a special European Qualifier Tournament (EQT) held in London. This tournament was used to determine the top eight teams qualifying for EQC spots.

Due to the COVID-19 pandemic, EQC did not take place in 2020 or 2021. The 2022 EQC tournament was held in Limerick, Ireland. The planned EQT that would have taken place in Cardiff to determine spots was canceled due to COVID fears. EQC spots were instead awarded based on the performance of teams in the previous events in the season. The EQC 2022 tournament was won by Werewolves of London.

== National teams ==
QuadballUK plays hosts to Team England, Team Scotland and Team Wales which represent their respective countries in international quidditch tournaments.

Team Scotland made their tournament debut at the 2019 IQA European Games in Bamberg. Team England and Team Wales made their tournament debuts at the 2022 IQA European Games in Limerick, with England winning the tournament.

Previously there was a Team UK, however in 2021 this was split into the 3 independent teams. The UK team made its debut in 2012 at the Summer Games in Oxford. Team UK's achievements included a win at the 2017 IQA European Games and numerous medal placements at other international tournaments. Team UK's final tournament appearance was a 3rd place medal at the 2019 IQA European Games.

Below is a table of all major fixtures by UK national teams.

Competition	Host nation	Placement				Number of teams
Competition	Host nation	UK (United Kingdom)	England	Scotland	Wales	Number of teams
2012 Summer Games	Oxford, UK (United Kingdom)	5th	•	•	•	5
2014 IQA Global Games	Burnaby, Canada	4th	•	•	•	7
2015 IQA European Games	Sarteano, Italy	2nd	•	•	•	12
2016 IQA World Cup	Frankfurt, Germany	3rd	•	•	•	21
2017 IQA European Games	Oslo, Norway	1st	•	•	•	15
2018 IQA World Cup	Florence, Italy	4th	•	•	•	29
2019 IQA European Games	Bamberg, Germany	3rd	•	14th	•	20
2022 IQA European Games	Limerick, Ireland (Republic of Ireland)	•	1st	15th	16th	20
2024 IQA European Games	London, England	•	2nd	14th	11th	15
2025 IQA World Cup	Tubize, Belgium	•	4th	23rd	26th	31
2026 European Games	Salou,Spain	•	TBD	TBD	TBD	TBD
2027 IQA World Cup	London,England	•	TBD	TBD	TBD	TBD

== See also ==
- Quidditch (sport)
- International Quidditch Association
- United Kingdom national quidditch team
- England national quadball team
- Scotland national quadball team
