= European Quadball Cup =

- Organiser(s): Quadball Europe European Quidditch Cup vzw
- Founded: 2012; 14 years ago
- Region: Europe
- Teams: 32 for D1; 24 for D2
- Current champions: (Belgium) Ghent Gargoyles Quadball club (1st title)
- Most championships: (Belgium) Antwerp QC (4 titles)
- Website: https://www.quidditcheurope.org/events/eqc

The European Quadball Cup, also known as EQC and formerly as the European Quidditch Championship, is the culminating championship tournament for the sport of quadball in Europe. It began to be legitimised in 2014 when the International Quadball Association became an international federation for quadball. The first tournament took place in 2012 in France as quidditch began to develop across Europe. Today, the tournament is the highest level of championship in Europe besides the European Games with league-level tournaments being the qualifying competitions. In 2026, Division 1 of EQC was held in Pfaffenhofen an der Ilm, Germany, where the Ghent Gargoyles Quadball club won the championship for the first time in their history. Antwerp QC remain the most successful team in the tournaments history with 4 championships and 2 second places.

== History ==
Originally held in Lesparre-Médoc, France, EQC has since grown into the largest quadball tournament in Europe. EQC 2014 saw teams from almost more countries than the 2014 Global Games, and EQC 2015 received teams from at least twelve different quadball-playing nations.

== Qualification ==
EQC 2015 saw a different form of qualification than its predecessors that introduced a team limit to the tournament as well as qualification guidelines. The Quadball Europe committee has planned to change the qualification format for EQC 2016 and onward. Currently, the committee for EQC is distributing bids to individual nations based on discussions with NGBs' representatives and team pre-registration. It is for each national governing body of quadball to determine how individual bids will be partitioned to teams under their jurisdiction.

Starting with the 2018–19 season, the European Quadball Cup is held in two divisions, Division 1 and Division 2. The stated reason was to facilitate both highly competitive gameplay at the top end, and to keep up with the growing player base in Europe.

Due to the COVID-19 pandemic there was no event in 2020.

== Hosts ==
Locations of the European Quadball Cups

EQC 2018 was held in Pfaffenhofen an der Ilm, Germany.

2017's edition of the tournament was held in the Belgian city of Mechelen after Gallipoli 2016.

EQC 2015 was being hosted by Oxford University's quadball club and QuidditchUK. EQC 2014 was hosted by the then-Belgium Muggle Quidditch (current: Belgian Quadball Federation) and the Brussels Qwaffles. The first EQC was hosted by the then-French Quidditch Association (current: Fédération du Quadball Français).

=== Selection procedures ===
Interested teams or NGBs submit a bid proposal outlining their location, the cost and the benefits attached to their bid to a sub-committee composed of Quadball Europe members. The sub-committee then chooses the bid and selects from an applicant pool the tournament director.

== Past champions of Division 1 ==
| Year | Host | Winner | Score | Runner-up | Third place | Score | Fourth place | Number of teams |
|---|---|---|---|---|---|---|---|---|
| 2012 | (France) Lesparre-Médoc | (France); Paris Phénix | 50*–20 | (France); Paris Frog | (Italy); Milano Meneghins | 120*–70 | (France); Anthéna Lesparre | 6 |
| 2014 | (Belgium) Brussels | (United Kingdom); Radcliffe Chimeras | 100*–30 | (France); Paris Phénix | (Belgium); Brussels Qwaffles | 50*–20 | (Italy); Lunatica QC | 12 |
| 2015 | (United Kingdom) Oxford | (France); Paris Titans | 150*–80 | (United Kingdom); Radcliffe Chimeras | Not played Southampton QC1 (United Kingdom) vs. (United Kingdom) Nottingham Nightmares | | | 32 |
| 2016 | (Italy) Gallipoli | (France); Paris Titans | 120*–60 | (Belgium); Antwerp QC | Not played METU Unicorns (Turkey) vs. (United Kingdom) Nottingham Nightmares | | | 40 |
| 2017 | (Belgium) Mechelen | (Belgium); Antwerp QC | 120*–110 | (Turkey); METU Unicorns | (United Kingdom); Werewolves of London | 80*–60 | (Norway); NTNUI Rumpeldunk | 32 |
| 2018 | (Germany) Pfaffenhofen an der Ilm | (France); Paris Titans | 130*–70 | (Belgium); Antwerp QC | (Turkey); METU Unicorns | 160°*–140*° | (United Kingdom); Velociraptors QC | 32 |
| 2019 | (Belgium) Harelbeke | (France); Paris Titans | 170*–90 | (Turkey); METU Unicorns | (United Kingdom); Werewolves of London | 170*–80 | (Turkey); ODTU Hippogriffs | 32 |
| 2022 | (Republic of Ireland) Limerick | (United Kingdom); Werewolves of London | 100*–60 | (Italy); DNA Quidditch | (France); Paris Titans | 140*–50 | (France); Paris Frog | 32 |
| 2023 | (Germany) Heidelberg | (Belgium); Antwerp QC | 130*–30 | (United Kingdom); Werewolves of London | (Germany); Ruhr Phoenix | 140*–70 | (Germany); Braunschweiger Broomicorns | 32 |
| 2024 | (Spain) Salou | (Belgium); Antwerp QC | 150*–30 | (Germany); Ruhr Phoenix | (United Kingdom); London QC | 120*–100 | (France); Paris Titans | 32 |
| 2025 | (Spain) Salou | (Belgium) Antwerp QC | 150–110* | (Germany) Ruhr Phoenix | (Germany) Braunschweiger Broomicorns | 220*–130 | (France) Paris Titans | 30 |
| 2026 | (Germany) Pfaffenhofen an der Ilm | (Belgium) Ghent Gargoyles Quadball | 130*–90 | (Germany) Ruhr Phoenix | (Germany) Braunschweiger Broomicorns | 180–130* | (Germany) Rheinos Bonn | 24 |

=== Most successful teams ===
| Rank | Team | Champion | Runner-up | Third place | Total |
|---|---|---|---|---|---|
| 1 | (Belgium) Antwerp QC | 4 | 2 | 0 | 6 |
| 2 | (France) Paris Titans | 4 | 0 | 1 | 5 |
| 3 | (United Kingdom) Werewolves of London | 1 | 1 | 2 | 4 |
| 4 | (France) Paris Phénix | 1 | 1 | 0 | 2 |
| 4 | (United Kingdom) Radcliffe Chimeras | 1 | 1 | 0 | 2 |
| 6 | (Belgium) Ghent Gargoyles Quadball Club | 1 | 0 | 0 | 1 |
| 7 | (Germany) Ruhr Phoenix | 0 | 3 | 1 | 4 |
| 8 | (Turkey) METU Unicorns | 0 | 2 | 2 | 4 |
| 9 | (France) Paris Frog | 0 | 1 | 0 | 1 |
| 9 | (Italy) DNA Quidditch | 0 | 1 | 0 | 1 |
| 10 | (United Kingdom) Nottingham Nightmares | 0 | 0 | 2 | 2 |
| 10 | (Germany) Braunschweiger Broomicorns | 0 | 0 | 2 | 2 |

=== Most successful Nations ===
| Rank | Team | Champion | Runner-up | Third place | Total |
|---|---|---|---|---|---|
| 1 | France | 5 | 2 | 1 | 8 |
| 1 | Belgium | 5 | 2 | 1 | 8 |
| 3 | United Kingdom | 2 | 2 | 6 | 10 |
| 4 | Germany | 0 | 3 | 3 | 6 |
| 5 | Turkey | 0 | 2 | 2 | 4 |
| 5 | Italy | 0 | 1 | 1 | 2 |

== Past champions of Division 2 ==
| Year | Host | Winner | Score | Runner-up | Third place | Score | Fourth place | Number of teams |
|---|---|---|---|---|---|---|---|---|
| 2019 | (Poland) Warsaw | (Germany); SCC Berlin Bluecaps | 120*–50 | (Germany); LSV Looping Lux Leipzig | (Austria); Vienna Vanguards | 190°°°–180*°° | (Germany); Augsburg Owls | 16 |
| 2022 | (Italy) Brescia | (Spain); Dementores A Coruña | 200*–130 | (Germany); Bielefelder Basilisken | (United Kingdom); Southsea Quidditch | 120–90* | (Poland); Kraków Dragons | 24 |
| 2023 | (France) Golbey | (Spain); Sevilla Warriors QT | 160*–90 | (Germany); Münster Marauders | (Austria); Vienna Vanguards | 110*–40 | (Germany); Darmstadt Athenas | 24 |
| 2024 | (Spain) Salou | (Germany); Münster Marauders | 140*–120 | (Catalonia); Barcelona Eagles QT | (France); Olympiens Q | 90*–0 | (Germany); Cologne Cannons | 24 |
| 2025 | (Spain) Salou | (Turkey); Hacettepe Pegasus | 140–110* | (Germany); Augsburg Owls | (Italy); Bombarda Brixia QC | 120*–100 | (United Kingdom); Werewolves of London | 23 |

=== Most successful teams ===
| Rank | Team | Champion | Runner-up | Third place | Total |
|---|---|---|---|---|---|
| 1 | (Germany) Münster Marauders | 1 | 1 | 0 | 2 |
| 2 | (Germany) SCC Berlin Bluecaps | 1 | 0 | 0 | 1 |
| 2 | (Spain) Dementores A Coruña | 1 | 0 | 0 | 1 |
| 2 | (Spain) Sevilla Warriors QT | 1 | 0 | 0 | 1 |
| 2 | (Turkey) Hacettepe Pegasus | 1 | 0 | 0 | 1 |
| 3 | (Germany) LSV Looping Lux Leipzig | 0 | 1 | 0 | 1 |
| 3 | (Germany) Bielefelder Basilisken | 0 | 1 | 0 | 1 |
| 3 | (Catalonia) Barcelona Eagles | 0 | 1 | 0 | 1 |
| 3 | (Germany) Augsburg Owls | 0 | 1 | 0 | 1 |
| 4 | (Austria) Vienna Vanguards | 0 | 0 | 2 | 2 |
| 5 | (United Kingdom) Southsea Quidditch | 0 | 0 | 1 | 1 |
| 5 | (France) Olympiens Q | 0 | 0 | 1 | 1 |
| 5 | (Italy) Bombarda Brixia QC | 0 | 0 | 1 | 1 |

=== Most successful Nations ===
| Rank | Team | Champion | Runner-up | Third place | Total |
|---|---|---|---|---|---|
| 1 | Germany | 2 | 4 | 0 | 6 |
| 2 | Spain | 2 | 0 | 0 | 2 |
| 3 | Turkey | 1 | 0 | 0 | 1 |
| 4 | Catalonia | 0 | 1 | 0 | 1 |
| 5 | Austria | 0 | 0 | 2 | 2 |
| 6 | United Kingdom | 0 | 0 | 1 | 1 |
| 6 | France | 0 | 0 | 1 | 1 |
| 6 | Italy | 0 | 0 | 1 | 1 |

== See also ==
- International Quidditch Association
- Muggle quidditch
- British Quidditch Cup
