= Belmont Community School =

Location
- Buckinghamshire Road; Belmont, County Durham, DH1 2QP; England; 54.7856°N 1.5289°W

Information
- Type: Community Secondary
- Motto: Learn, Progress, Achieve Together
- Religious affiliation: Mixed
- Established: 1880
- Local authority: Durham
- Department for Education URN: 114308 Tables
- Ofsted: Reports
- Headteacher: Paul Marsden
- Gender: Mixed
- Age: 11 to 16
- Enrolment: 725
- Capacity: 820
- Houses: Auckland, Barnard, Durham & Lumley
- Website: www.belmontschool.org.uk

Belmont Community School is a comprehensive school in Belmont, County Durham, England.

== Location ==
Belmont Community School is an 11–16 secondary school on the outskirts of Durham city. Its campus site is shared with Belmont Primary School. The school has a wide catchment area with students coming from Durham city and the surrounding villages, including Pittington, West Rainton, Ludworth, Thornley, Kelloe, Cassop, Quarrington Hill, Coxhoe, Bowburn, Shincliffe and The Sherburns.

== History ==
There has been a school on the Belmont Campus site since 1870. The original buildings, designed by Austin & Johnson are still visible. The school takes its name from its location in the Belmont area of Durham. The place-name consists of two elements, both of them Old French words, "bel" meaning beautiful, and "mont" or hill, so the name means ‘beautiful hill’. The present area known as Belmont takes its name from Belmont Hall, built in 1820 by Thomas Pemberton.

The current school was built in the 1960s and in 2007 had a new £500,000 Performing Arts Block added onto the campus. This block includes a professional dance, drama and music studio along with state-of-the-art recording equipment. On Saturdays the Performing Arts Block houses the Durham location of The Pauline Quirke Academy of Performing Arts.

The school was awarded Performing Arts specialist-school status in 2006, and the school was renamed Belmont School Community Arts College, when the new performing arts building was built. However the school returned to its original community school status in late 2011 when the DFE ceased its funding of specialisms for secondary schools. Nevertheless, the school still maintains a strong performing arts ethos, with several large productions each year.

In 2015, funding was secured from Badminton England to refurbish the Sports Hall with international standard badminton courts. The Sports Hall and Gymnasium as well as the Performing Arts Block and other facilities are open for community use outside school hours and are run by the Belmont Community Association.

2017 saw the Local Authority invest a significant amount of money into the school's Science facilities with the creation of 5 new laboratories.

== Academic performance ==
The March 2019 inspection of the school saw OFSTED grade Belmont as a "GOOD" school in all categories.

== Partnerships ==
The school works in partnership with a wide variety of organisations, such as:

- The Duke of Edinburgh Award Scheme (DoE)
- 102 Battalion, the Corps of the Royal Electrical and Mechanical Engineers (REME)
- The National Trust (Green Academies)
- The Ogden Trust
- The National Citizenship Service
- Seneca Pioneer Schools
- Business Durham
- Durham County Council
- Esh Group
- Barclays (Life Skills)
- Durham University
- Durham Sixth Form Centre
- New College Durham
- East Durham College (Houghall)

== Awards ==
Belmont Community School currently holds the following awards:

- Anti Bullying Gold Award from the ABA (Anti Bullying Alliance): For tackling bullying
- The Quality in Careers Standard Award: For careers advice for students.
- Educate & Celebrate Best Practice Award: For celebrating diversity and inclusion.
- County Durham Young Carers Charter Award: For supporting Young Carers.
- Primary inspiration through Enterprise (PIE project): For winning the 2019 enterprise project.
- The Teacher Development Trust Silver Award: For the quality of teacher professional development

== Notable alumni ==
- Benjamin Myers: Author and journalist
- Matt Baker: Television presenter with the BBC
- Emily Sarsfield: Olympic freestyle skier for team GB in 2018
