= Development Cup =

British quidditch tournament

The Development Cup, also known as Dev Cup, is a British quidditch tournament that runs parallel to the annual British Quidditch Cup, catering for those teams that did not qualify for the latter. The tournament is organised by QuidditchUK, the sport's national governing body, and follows International Quidditch Association rules. The inaugural event, held on 29–30 April 2017, was won by the Liverpuddly Cannons from Liverpool.

== Structure ==
The Development Cup consists of a round-robin of all 9 teams, in order to give each side the maximum amount of competitive experience.

== First tournament, April 2017 ==
The first annual Development Cup took place on the 29–30 April 2017 at Horspath Athletics Ground in Oxford. There were 9 teams in attendance. Four of whom, the Liverpuddly Cannons, St. Andrews Snidgets, Holyrood Hippogriffs, and UCLan Quidditch entered after coming in the bottom four places at Northern Cup 2016. The only team from Southern Cup 2016 to not qualify for British Quidditch Cup 2017 in this manner was The Flying Chaucers from the University of Kent. They declined to attend the Development Cup or any team event for the remainder of that season. Also amongst the teams at Dev Cup were those who had either failed to attend regionals or whose teams had been created after. The newly minted seconds teams of the Sheffield Quidditch Club and the London Unspeakables competed as well as the Bournemouth Banshees, Glasgow Grim Reapers, and Bath Quidditch Club.

For several sides, including Bath and Glasgow, it was the first tournament they had competed at. Liverpool and Edinburgh would go essentially unchallenged for the entire event, their match against each other being the only snitch-range game (played within 30 points) either would contest over the weekend. They went 7-0 and 6-1 respectively and won gold and silver. Bath established themselves in third place with a 5-3 record, which included a double-overtime result against London.

Bath Quidditch Club	190*	20	Sheffield Steelfins	Bournemouth Banshees	40	100*	Preston Poltergeists
Glasgow Grim Reapers	30	90*	London Unbreakables	Holyrood Hippogriffs 2nds	50	60*	Liverpuddly Cannons
St Andrews Snidgets	110*	40	Sheffield Steelfins	Bath Quidditch Club	220*	50	Bournemouth Banshees
Glasgow Grim Reapers	10	130*	Holyrood Hippogriffs 2nds	London Unbreakables	60	60*	Preston Poltergeists **

*Indicates that this score included a snitch-catch during regulation play. ^Indicates that this score included a snitch-catch during overtime play. ** London defeated Preston 100^-60 in overtime. ***Bath defeated London 100^*-70 in double overtime. ****Preston defeated Glasgow 70-60 in double overtime.

=== Final standings ===
The final standings at the end of the tournament were:

Placement	Team
1st	Liverpuddly Cannons
2nd	Holyrood Hippogriffs Seconds
3rd	Bath Quidditch Club
4th	London Unbreakables
5th	St Andrews Snidgets
6th	Preston Poltergeists
7th	Glasgow Grim Reapers
8th	Bournemouth Banshees
9th	Sheffield Steelfins

== Second Tournament, April 2018 ==
The second Development Cup took place on the 14–15 April 2018 at the University of York. It did not follow the round-robin format of its predecessor, instead utilising a rotating pool structure followed by a knockout bracket. The rotating pool format, known as the 'Naftel Slide', would seed a Pod 1 team into each of four pools with two unseeded opponents. After an initial round-robin, the top team in each pool 'slid' into the pool to the left, and the bottom team similarly moved to the right.

Development Cup 2018 featured 13 teams, most of whom having attended their respective regional tournament but not having qualified for the British Quidditch Cup. Three teams were 'mercenary' squads formed from the merger of two existing clubs who had been unable to field a full roster alone. The teams were grouped as follows:

Pool A	Pool B	Pool C	Pool D
Glasgow Grim Reapers	St Andrews Snidgets	Bath Quidditch Club	Oxford Quidlings
Stirling Ridgebacks	Preston Poltergeists	Northern Wyverns - Belfast	Manchester Minotaurs
Northern Lights	London Unbreakables	Sheffield Sea Lions	The Flying Catapults
			Derby Daemons

=== First round ===
The first round of gameplay proceeded as follows:

Pool A			Pool B			Pool C			Pool D		
Team 1	Score	Team 2	Team 1	Score	Team 2	Team 1	Score	Team 2	Team 1	Score	Team 2
Glasgow Grim Reapers	110*-40	Northern Lights	St Andrews Snidgets	30-130*	London Unbreakables	Bath Quidditch Club	70*-60	Northern Wyverns Belfast	Oxford Quidlings	30-100*	Derby Daemons
Glasgow Grim Reapers	130*-60	Stirling Ridgebacks	St Andrews Snidgets	160*-40	Preston Poltergeists	Bath Quidditch Club	100*-40	Sheffield Sea Lions	The Flying Catapults	130-60*	Manchester Minotaurs
Northern Lights	110-120*	Stirling Ridgebacks	London Unbreakables	80-40*	Preston Poltergiests	Northern Wyverns Belfast	120-40*	Sheffield Sea Lions	Oxford Quidlings	90*-40	The Flying Catapults
									Derby Daemons	150*-30	Manchester Minotaurs
									Oxford Quidlings	110-30*	Manchester Minotaurs
									Derby Daemons	130*-30	The Flying Catapults

=== Second round ===
The teams at the top of each pool; Glasgow, London, Bath and Derby, all as-yet undefeated, moved one place to the left, whilst the bottom teams (including the bottom two teams from Pool D) moved one place to the right. The new pools thus constructed were;

Pool A	Pool B	Pool C	Pool D
London Unbreakables	Bath Quidditch Club	Derby Daemons	Glasgow Grim Reapers
Stirling Ridgebacks	St Andrews Snidgets	Northern Wyverns - Belfast	Oxford Quidlings
The Flying Catapults	Northern Lights	Preston Poltergeists	Sheffield Sea Lions
Manchester Minotaurs			

This led to a second round of pool play with the following results:

Pool A			Pool B			Pool C			Pool D		
Team 1	Score	Team 2	Team 1	Score	Team 2	Team 1	Score	Team 2	Team 1	Score	Team 2
Stirling Ridgebacks	80*-60	London Unbreakables	Northern Lights	60-110*	St Andrews Snidgets	Preston Poltergeists	0-90*	Northern Wyverns Belfast	Glasgow Grim Reapers	100-30*	Sheffield Sea Lions
London Unbreakables	140*-10	Manchester Minotaurs	Northern Lights	20-90*	Bath Quidditch Club	Preston Poltergeists	10-110*	Derby Daemons	Glasgow Grim Reapers	90*-40	Oxford Quidlings
Stirling Ridgebacks	140-150*	The Flying Catapults	St Andrews Snidgets	70*-20	Bath Quidditch Club	Northern Wyverns Belfast	100*-60	Derby Daemons	Sheffield Sea Lions	40*-100	Oxford Quidlings
Stirling Ridgebacks	130*-10	Manchester Minotaurs									
London Unbreakables	100*-30	The Flying Catapults									

=== Final rounds ===
Following this second stage of pool play, the teams were divided between those who had played four games and those who had played five. The top four teams in each category entered a single-elimination bracket, whilst the bottom five played a consolation round comprising play-in elimination matches and a round-robin of the three surviving teams. The tournament was won in a commanding fashion by the Glasgow Grim Reapers, who defeated an injury-laden Bath Quidditch Club 160*-0. Meanwhile the St Andrews Snidgets picked up Bronze over the Oxford Quidlings.

=== Final standings ===
Placement	Team
1st	Glasgow Grim Reapers
2nd	Bath Quidditch Club
3rd	St Andrews Snidgets
4th	Oxford Quidlings
5th	London Unbreakables
6th	Derby Daemons
7th	Northern Wyverns Belfast
8th	Stirling Dumyat Dragons
9th	Northern Lights
10th	Preston Poltergeists
11th	The Flying Catapults
12th	Sheffield Sealions
13th	Manchester Minotaurs

== Third tournament, March 2019 ==
The third Development Cup took place on the 2–3 March 2019 at the Salford Sports Village in Manchester. 11 teams competed over the weekend and three slots at the British Quidditch Cup in April 2019 were available for the winners. These were claimed by Winchester Wampus, London Unstoppables and the Chester Centurions (although Winchester Wampus did not attend BQC 2019). There were also coaching workshops scheduled over the weekend with the aim to help improve teams' skills and knowledge on topics such as ball handling, contact and refereeing.

Placement	Team
1st	Winchester Wampus
2nd	London Unstoppables
3rd	Chester Centurions
4th	Loughborough Longshots
5th	Cambridge University QC
6th	Keele Squirrels
7th	Stirling Dumyat Dragons
8th	Manchester Minotaurs
9th	Sheffield Steelfins
10th	Bangor Broken Broomsticks
11th	Falmouth Falcons

== Fourth tournament, March 2020 ==
The fourth Development Cup took place on the 7–8 March 2020 and was again held at the Salford Sports Village in Manchester. 9 teams competed over the weekend, with three slots available for the winners at the upcoming British Quidditch Cup in April 2020. However BQC 2020 ended up being cancelled due to COVID-19. Just like in the previous tournament, various coaching workshops were run over the weekend. In phase 1, teams were split into three groups of 3 teams each and played in a round-robin style. Phase 3 consisted of a knockout tournament to determine the final winner.

The full results were as follows:

=== Phase 1 - Group stage ===
Group A				Group B				Group C			
Team 1	Score	Team 2	Time	Team 1	Score	Team 2	Time	Team 1	Score	Team 2	Time
Manchester Minotaurs	230 - 30*	Kent Quidditch Club	42:16	Durhamstrang	0 - 150*	London Unbreakables	28:39	Radcliffe Chimeras	220* - 0	Sheffield Steelfins	27:51
Bangor Broken Broomsticks	80* - 0	Manchester Minotaurs	21:07	London Unbreakables	140* - 0	Stirling Dumyat Dragons	22:49	Radcliffe Chimeras	150* - 40	Swansea Scorpions	30:07
Bangor Broken Broomsticks	160 - 60*	Kent Quidditch Club	33:19	Durhamstrang	120* - 50	Stirling Dumyat Dragons	19:42	Sheffield Steelfins	40 - 190*	Swansea Scorpions	25:36

Group rankings
Placement	Group A			Group B			Group C		
Placement	Team	W	L	Team	W	L	Team	W	L
1st	Bangor Broken Broomsticks	2	0	London Unbreakables	2	0	Radcliffe Chimeras	2	0
2nd	Manchester Minotaurs	1	1	Durhamstrang	1	1	Swansea Scorpions	1	1
3rd	Kent Quidditch Club	0	2	Stirling Dumyat Dragons	0	2	Sheffield Steelfins	0	2

=== Phase 2 ===
Team 1	Score	Team 2	Time
Bangor Broken Broomsticks	120* - 10	Durhamstrang	22:33
Swansea Scorpions	120 - 40*	Kent Quidditch Club	29:38
Bangor Broken Broomsticks	220* - 10	Sheffield Steelfins	27:25
Radcliffe Chimeras	170* - 30	Manchester Minotaurs	20:54
London Unbreakables	110* - 50	Swansea Scorpions	20:51
Radcliffe Chimeras	160 - 60*	Stirling Dumyat Dragons	27:10
Durhamstrang	180* - 10	Sheffield Steelfins	22:37
London Unbreakables	200* - 30	Kent Quidditch Club	23:44
Manchester Minotaurs	200* - 40	Stirling Dumyat Dragons	41:10

=== Phase 3 - Knockout tournament/Consolidation Round Robin ===
Quarter-final
Bangor Broken Broomsticks	150*
Durhamstrang	50
Swansea Scorpions	110°°°
Manchester Minotaurs	100*°°

Semi-final
London Unbreakables	170*
Bangor Broken Broomsticks	130
Radcliffe Chimeras	200*
Swansea Scorpions	20

Final
London Unbreakables	70
Radcliffe Chimeras	130*
3rd place play-off
Bangor Broken Broomsticks	110°°
Swansea Scorpions	90*°

5th place play-off
Durhamstrang	80°°
Manchester Minotaurs	100**

Consolidation Round Robin
Team 1	Score	Team 2	Time
Stirling Dumyat Dragons	70 - 50*	Kent Quidditch Club	38:39
Stirling Dumyat Dragons	90°° - 70*°	Sheffield Steelfins	38:53
Kent Quidditch Club	120° - 30°	Sheffield Steelfins	45:00

=== Final standings ===
Placement	Team	Stage
1st	Radcliffe Chimeras	Final
2nd	London Unbreakables	Final
3rd	Bangor Broken Broomsticks	Semi-final
4th	Swansea Scorpions	Semi-final
5th	Manchester Minotaurs	Quarter-final
6th	Durhamstrang	Quarter-final
7th	Stirling Dumyat Dragons	Consolidation Round Robin
8th	Kent QC	Consolidation Round Robin
9th	Sheffield Steelfins	Consolidation Round Robin

== Fifth tournament, April 2022 ==
Due to COVID-19, no Development Cup took place in 2021. The fifth tournament took place on 23 April 2022 at the Derby Rugby Club in Derby. 3 teams competed over the day with Bangor Broken Broomsticks winning the tournament.

The full results were as follows:

Round Robin 1				Round Robin 2			
Team 1	Score	Team 2	Time	Team 1	Score	Team 2	Time
Bangor Broken Broomsticks	110 - 50*	Bristol Bears	23:02	Bristol Bears	170 - 40*	Glasgow Grim Reapers	27:33
Bristol Bears	120* - 0	Glasgow Grim Reapers	19:00	Bangor Broken Broomsticks	120* - 60	Bristol Bears	18:51
Bangor Broken Broomsticks	180* - 20	Glasgow Grim Reapers	18:13	Bangor Broken Broomsticks	170* - 30	Glasgow Grim Reapers	

=== Final standings ===
Placement	Team
1st	Bangor Broken Broomsticks
2nd	Bristol Bears
3rd	Glasgow Grim Reapers

== Sixth tournament, April 2023 ==
The sixth Development Cup is scheduled to take place on 15 April 2023 in Derby.
