= British Quadball Cup =

British sports tournament

Tournament information
- Month played: April (previously March)
- Established: 2013
- Administrator: QuadballUK
- Format: Round-robin in groups followed by knockout tournament
- Participants: 24 (previously 32)

Locations of the British Quidditch Cups

The British Quadball Cup, also referred to as the British Quidditch Cup, is a quadball tournament held in the United Kingdom that follows the rules laid out by the International Quadball Association. It is organised by QuadballUK and is the largest UK tournament of the year.

The tournament previously had all teams in the UK competing in one tournament; since 2022, a separation has been formed between University and Community teams. This split was further solidified in 2026, when the two tournaments were held at different times. The University tournament, renamed BUQC (British University Quadball Cup), takes place in April, while the community tournament takes place in September.

Other regular tournaments not organised by QuadballUK also take place in the UK including the Highlander Cup held in Edinburgh, Cottonopolis held in Manchester, and Scottish Cup held in St Andrews. There was also a tournament that ran for 6 years called Whiteknights that was held in Reading.

== Results ==
The following table shows a list of all British Quadball Cups to date. The team that caught the flag is denoted with an asterisk. Up until 2019 both university and community quadball teams played in the same tournament together. From 2022 and onwards they compete separately.

Year	Host city	Competition	Final			3rd place match			Teams
Year	Host city	Competition	Champions	Score	Runners-up	3rd place	Score	4th place	Teams
2013	Oxford	Combined	Oxford Radcliffe Chimeras	110 – 60*	Keele Squirrels	Bangor Broken Broomsticks	60* – 40	Southampton QC	16
2015	Nottingham	Combined	Southampton QC	120* – 90	Oxford Radcliffe Chimeras	Keele Squirrels	160* – 130	Loughborough Longshots	23
2016	Rugeley	Combined	Oxford Radcliffe Chimeras	150* – 50	Warwick QC	Durhamstrang	100* – 90	Nottingham Nightmares	32
2017	Rugeley	Combined	Velociraptors QC	260* – 60	Brizzlebears	Werewolves of London	120* – 20	Holyrood Hippogriffs	32
2018	Oxford	Combined	Velociraptors QC	70* – 30	Warwick QC	Werewolves of London	110* – 30	Southampton QC	32
2019	Newcastle	Combined	London QC	160* – 70	Werewolves of London Firsts	Velociraptors QC	150* – 40	Southampton QC	32
2022	Sheffield	University	Southampton QC	130* – 120	Exeter Eagles	Leicester Thestrals	100 – 50*	Warwick QC	11
2022	Sheffield	Community	Werewolves of London Firsts	170* – 160	London QC	Velociraptors QC	150* – 40	Olympians QC	11
2023	Sheffield	University	Warwick QC	240 – 230*	York Horntails	Southamption QC	100 – 60*	OUQC	11
2023	Sheffield	Community	London QC	120* – 40	Velociraptors QC	Werewolves of London Firsts	160* – 80*	Olympians QC	12
2024	Sheffield	University	Warwick QC	150 – 90*	Bankers QC		–		
2024	Sheffield	Community	Werewolves of London Firsts	150 – 140*	London QC	Velociraptors QC	–	Southsea QC	
2025	Newcastle	University	OUQC	130* – 50	Holyrood Hippogriffs	Warwick QC	110* – 60	Bankers QC	8
2025	Newcastle	Community	Werewolves of London Firsts	80* – 60	London QC	Velociraptors QC	–	Olympians QC	
2026	Newcastle	University	OUQC	260* – 260	Cambridge Chronophages		–		4
2026	Newcastle	Community		–			–		

=== All Time ===
Team	Champions	Runners-up	3rd place	4th place	Top 4 App.
Oxford Radcliffe Chimeras/OUQC	4	1	0	1	6
Werewolves of London (Firsts)	3	1	3	0	7
London Quadball Club	2	3	0	0	5
Warwick QC	2	2	1	1	6
Velociraptors QC	2	1	4	0	7
Southampton QC	2	0	1	3	6
Keele Squirrels	0	1	1	0	2
Bankers QC	0	1	0	1	2
Holyrood Hippogriffs	0	1	0	1	2
Exeter Eagles	0	1	0	0	1
Brizzlebears	0	1	0	0	1
Cambridge Chronophages	0	1	0	0	1
Leicester Thestrals	0	0	1	0	1
Durhamstrang	0	0	1	0	1
Bangor Broken Broomsticks	0	0	1	0	1
Olympians Quadball Club	0	0	0	3	3
Nottingham Nightmares	0	0	0	1	1
Loughborough Longshots	0	0	0	1	1
Southsea QC	0	0	0	1	1

== First tournament, November 2013 ==
The first British Quidditch Cup took place in Oxford, England on 9 and 10 November 2013. Sixteen teams from England, Scotland, Wales and Ireland competed over two days for the inaugural cup, playing in four groups of four with the highest placed eight going on to take part in the knock out format quarter finals, semi finals and the final.

=== Group stages ===
Seeding	Team	Seeding	Team	Seeding	Team	Seeding	Team
1st	Oxford Radcliffe Chimeras	1st	Leicester Thestrals	1st	Southampton QC	1st	Bangor
2nd	Nottingham Nightmares	2nd	Oxford Quidlings	2nd	Leeds Griffins	2nd	Keele Squirrels
DNQ	Keele Squirrels	DNQ	Norwich Nifflers	DNQ	St.Andrews Snidgets	DNQ	Holyrood Hippogriffs
DNQ	Derby QC	DNQ	Chester Chasers	DNQ	Reading Rocs	DNQ	NUI Galway

DNQ= Did not qualify

=== Knockout stage scores ===
Quarter-finals
Leicester Thestrals	30
Keele Squirrels	80*
Bangor Broken Broomsticks	120*
Nottingham Nightmares	50
Oxford Radcliffe Chimeras	140*
Leeds Griffins	0
Southampton QC	100*
Oxford Quidlings	0

Semi-finals
Keele Squirrels	80*
Bangor Broken Broomsticks	10
Oxford Radcliffe Chimeras	110*
Southampton QC	0

Final
Keele Squirrels	60*
Oxford Radcliffe Chimeras	110
Third place
Southampton QC	40
Bangor Broken Broomsticks	60*

(*) indicates a snitch catch. Source

(^) indicates a snitch catch in overtime

=== Final Positions ===
Overall, the winners were the Radcliffe Chimeras from Oxford University led by captain Ashley Cooper, with Keele Squirrels of Keele University taking the silver medals and the Bangor Broken Broomsticks from Bangor University taking the bronze medals.

== Second tournament, March 2015 ==
The second British Quidditch Cup took place on 7–8 March 2015. After five location bids were submitted in May–June 2014, the location for the tournament was narrowed down to the venues proposed by the Loughborough Longshots, Nottingham Nightmares and Norwich Nifflers. After much deliberation, site visits and further communication, the organising committee accepted the bid put forward by the Nightmares, resulting in the 23 teams competing at Wollaton Hall and Deer Park, Nottingham.

=== Group stage results ===
Seeding	Team	Seeding	Team	Seeding	Team	Seeding	Team
1st	Keele Squirrels	1st	Oxford Quidlings	1st	Durhamstrang	1st	Loughborough Longshots
2nd	Derby QC	2nd	Falmouth Falcons	2nd	Nottingham Nightmares	2nd	Cambridge QC
3rd	Warwick QC	3rd	Leicester Thestrals	3rd	Bangor	3rd	Southampton QC seconds
DNQ	Reading Rocs	DNQ	Leads Griffins	DNQ	The Flying Chaucers	DNQ	Chester Chasers

Seeding	Team	Seeding	Team
1st	Radcliffe Chimeras	1st	Southampton QC Firsts
2nd	Bristol Brizzlepuffs	2nd	London Unspeakables
DNQ	Norwich Nifflers	DNQ	Holyrood Hippogriffs
DNQ	St. Andrews Snidgets	Withdrew	Surrey Stags

DNQ= Did not qualify

=== Knockout stage results ===
Quarter-finals
Southampton QC	290*
London Unspeakables	10
Leicester Thestrals	20
Keele Squirrels	110*
Oxford Radcliffe Chimeras	110*
Nottingham Nightmares	20
Loughborough Longshots	120^
Falmouth Falcons	90*

Semi-finals
Southampton QC	70*
Keele Squirrels	0
Oxford Radcliffe Chimeras	180*
Loughborough Longshots	50

Final
Southampton QC	120*^
Oxford Racliffe Chimeras	90
Third place
Keele Squirrels	160*
Loughborough Longshots	130

=== Final standings ===
At the second British Quidditch cup Southampton Quidditch Club's first team claiming gold, Oxford Radcliffe Chimeras silver and the Keele Squirrels bronze.

Position	Team	Stage	Position	Team	Stage	Position	Team	Stage
1st	Southampton QC firsts	Final	9th	Durhamstrang	R16	17th	Holyrood Hippogriffs	Group
2nd	Oxford Radcliff Chimeras	Final	10th	Oxford Quidlings	R16	18th	Leeds	Group
3rd	Keele Squirrels	Semis	11th	Cambridge QC	R16	19th	Norwich Nifflers	Group
4th	Loughborough Longshots	Semis	12th	Derby	R16	20th	St Andrews Snidgets	Group
5th	Nottingham Nightmares	Quarters	13th	Bristol's Brizzlepuffs	R16	21st	Reading Rocs	Group
6th	London Unspeakables	Quarters	14th	Bangor	R16	22nd	Chester	Group
7th	Falmouth	Quarters	15th	Warwick QC	R16	23rd	The Flying Chaucers	Group
8th	Leicester	Quarters	16th	Southampton QC seconds	R16	Withdrew	Surrey Stags	N/A

== Third Tournament, March 2016 ==
The third British Quidditch Cup took place at Rugeley Leisure Centre on 19 and 20 March 2016. 32 teams competed, with the first day involving 8 groups of 4 teams where the first two teams entered the upper bracket and the rest entered a lower bracket. These two brackets were then played as knock-out stages on day two.

=== Group stage results ===
Seeding	Team	Seeding	Team	Seeding	Team	Seeding	Team
1st	Keele Squirrels	1st	Oxford Radcliffe Chimeras	1st	Warwick QC	1st	BrizzleBears
2nd	Bangor	2nd	Holyrood hippogriffs firsts	2nd	Derby QC	2nd	Werewolves of London
3rd	St. Andrews Snidgets	3rd	Direwolves	3rd	Oxford Quidlings	3rd	Reading Rocs
4th	Norwich Nifflers	4th	Unspeakables	4th	Southampton QC Seconds	4th	Cambridge QC

Seeding	Team	Seeding	Team	Seeding	Team	Seeding	Team
1st	Southampton QC Firsts	1st	Leicester Thestrals	1st	Durhamstrang	1st	Nottingham Nightmares
2nd	Falmouth Falcons	2nd	Loughborough	2nd	Chester Centurions	2nd	Leeds Griffins
3rd	HogYork Horntails	3rd	BrizzleBees	3rd	Taxes QC	3rd	Swansea
4th	Manchester Manticores	4th	The Flying Chaucers	4th	Keele Krakens	4th	Holyrood hippogriffs seconds

=== Knockout stage results ===
==== Upper bracket ====
Round of 16
Warwick QC	220*
Derby Union QC	20
Brizzlebears	60
Leeds Griffins	120*
Nottingham Nightmares	140*
Bangor Broken Broomsticks	30
Chester Centurions	30
Keele Squirrels	180*
Leicester Thestrals	40
Loughborough Longshots	70*
Holyrood Hippogriffs Firsts	0
Radcliffe Chimeras	200*
Southampton QC	90*
Falmouth Falcons	0
Durhamstrang	90*
Werewolves of London	30

Quarter-finals
Warwick QC	100
Leeds Griffins	40*
Nottingham Nightmares	200*
Keele Squirrels	50
Loughborough Longshots	70
Radcliffe Chimeras	160*
Southampton QC	60
Durhamstrang	90*

Semi-finals
Warwick QC	130^
Nottingham Nightmares	100*
Radcliffe Chimeras	130*
Durhamstrang	30

Final
Warwick QC	50
Radcliffe Chimeras	150*
Third place
Durhamstrang	100*
Nottingham Nightmares	90

The third place match went to overtime without a snitch catch.

==== Consolation bracket ====
Round of 16
Taxes QC	240*
Holyrood Hippogriffs Seconds	10
Brizzlebees	120*
Flying Chaucers	0
HogYork Horntails	150*
Keele Krakens	0
Swansea	100*
Manchester	20
Reading Rocs	100*
Norwich Nifflers	60
St Andrews Snidgets	70*
Southampton QC 2nds	60
Oxford Quidlings	30
Cambridge	110*
Durham Direwolves	70
London Unspeakables	30

Quarter-finals
Taxes QC	140*
London Unspeakables	40*
Brizlebees	90*
Cambridge	50
HogYork Horntails	100*
St Andrews Snidgets	200
Swansea	130*
Reading Rocs	20

Semi-finals
Taxes QC	140*
London Unspeakables	30
Brizzlebees	50*
HogYork Horntails	130

Final
Taxes	100
HogYork Horntails	140*
Third place
Swansea	120
Brizzlebees	50*

The third place match went to overtime without a snitch catch.

=== Final standings ===
This tournament saw Oxford reclaiming gold, Warwick QC claiming silver, and the Durham's durhamstrang claiming bronze. The LB bracket was won by York university's HogYork Horntails with Taxes QC coming runners up.

Position	Team	Stage	Position	Team	Stage	Position	Team	Stage	Position	Team	Stage
1st	Oxford Chimeras	Final	9th	Leicester	R16	17th	HogYork Horntails	LB finals	25th	Durham Direwolves	LB R16
2nd	Warwick QC	Final	10th	Brizzlebears	R16	18th	Taxes	LB Finals	26th	Oxford Quidlings	LB R16
3rd	Durhamstrang	Semis	11th	Werewolves of London	R16	19th	Swansea	LB semis	27th	Southampton QC seconds	LB R16
4th	Nottingham Nightmares	Semis	12th	Bangor	R16	20th	Brizzlebees	LB semis	28th	Norwich Nifflers	LB R16
5th	Southampton QC firsts	Quarters	13th	Chester	R16	21st	Reading Rocs	LB Quarters	29th	Manchester	LB R16
6th	Keele squirrels	Quarters	14th	Falmouth	R16	22nd	St Andrews Snidgets	LB Quarters	30th	The Flying Chaucers	LB R16
7th	Leeds	Quarters	15th	Edinburgh Firsts	R16	23rd	Cambridge QC	LB Quarters	31st	Keele Krakens	LB R16
8th	Loughborough Longshots	Quarters	16th	Derby	R16	24th	London Unspeakables	LB Quarters	32nd	Edinburgh Seconds	LB R16

== Fourth Tournament, March 2017 ==
The fourth British Quidditch Cup took place at Rugeley Leisure Centre on 11–12 March 2017. the top 16 teams from the Northern and Southern regional tournaments competed, with the first day involving 8 groups of 4 teams where the top two teams entered the champions bracket and the others entered the consolation bracket. These two brackets were then played as knock-out stages on day two.

=== Group stage results ===
Seeding	Team	Seeding	Team	Seeding	Team	Seeding	Team
1st	Velociraptors QC	1st	London Unspeakables	1st	Tornadoes QC	1st	Werewolves of London
2nd	Keele Squirrels	2nd	Leicester Thestrals	2nd	Oxford Radcliffe Chimeras	2nd	Leeds Griffins
3rd	Portsmouth Strikers	3rd	Cambridge QC	3rd	Chester Centurions	3rd	Norwich Nifflers
4th	BrizzleBees	4th	Nottingham	4th	Reading Rocs	4th	Durham Direwolves

Seeding	Team	Seeding	Team	Seeding	Team	Seeding	Team
1st	Durhamstrang	1st	BrizzleBears	1st	Loughborough Longshots	1st	Holyrood Hippogriffs firsts
2nd	Southampton QC Firsts	2nd	Bangor	2nd	Swansea	2nd	Warwick QC
3rd	HogYork Horntails	3rd	Exeter Eagles	3rd	Derby	3rd	Sheffield
4th	Falmouth Falcons	4th	Manchester Manticores	4th	Oxford Quidlings	4th	Southampton QC seconds

=== Knockout stage results ===
==== Champions bracket ====
Round of 16
Velociraptors	150*
Swansea	20
London Unspeakables	40
Warwick QC	150*
Tornadoes	60*
Southampton QC Firsts	50
Werewolves of London	100*
Bangor	10
Durhamstrang	90*
Radcliffe Chimeras	10
Brizzlebears	120*
Leeds	20
Loughborough Longshots	40
Keele Squirrels	90*
Holyrood Hippogriffs Firsts	120*
Leicester	50

Quarter-finals
Velociraptors	80*
Warwick QC	20
Tornadoes	30
Werewolves of London	150*
Durhamstrang	60*
Brizzlebears	70
Keele Squirrels	70
Holyrood Hippogriffs Firsts	190*

Semi-finals
Velociraptors	160*
Werewolves of London	40
Brizzlebears	80*
Holyrood Hippogriffs Firsts	30

Final
Velociraptors	260*
Brizzlebears	60
Third place
Werewolves of London	120*
Holyrood Hippogriffs Firsts	20

(*) indicates snitch catch

Brizzlebears vs Durhamstrang went to double overtime with no snitch catch

==== Consolation bracket ====
Round of 16
Portsmouth	120*
Oxford Quidlings	10
Cambridge	50*
SQC2	20
Chester	60
Falmouth	100*
Norwich	20
Manchester	170*
HogYork	210*
Reading	30
Exeter	230*
Durham Direwolves	70
Derby	80*
Brizzlebees	40
Sheffield	150*
Nottingham	40

Quarter-finals
Portsmouth	100*
Cambridge	40
Falmouth	120*
Manchester	30
HogYork	120*
Exeter	70
Derby	100*
Sheffield	150

Semi-finals
Portsmouth	20
Falmouth	120*
York	150*
Sheffield	60

Final
Falmouth	90*
HogYork	40
Third place
Portsmouth	140*
Sheffield	20

=== Final standings ===
This tournament saw Velociraptors QC claiming gold, Bristol's Brizzlebears claiming silver, and the Werewolves of London claiming bronze. The consolation bracket was won by Falmouth Falcons with York university's HogYork Horntails coming runners up.

Position	Team	Stage	Position	Team	Stage	Position	Team	Stage	Position	Team	Stage
1st	Velociraptors QC	Final	9th	Loughborough Longshots	R16	17th	Falmouth Falcons	Cons Final	25th	Chester	Cons R16
2nd	Brizzlebears	Final	10th	Southampton QC 1sts	R16	18th	HogYork	Cons final	26th	Nottingham Nightmares	Cons R16
3rd	Werewolves of London	Semis	11th	Leeds	R16	19th	Portsmouth	Cons Semis	27th	Norwich	Cons R16
4th	Edinburgh 1st	Semis	12th	Oxford Chimeras	R16	20th	Sheffield	Cons Semis	28th	Southampton QC 2nds	Cons R16
5th	Durhamstrang	Quarters	13th	London Unspeakables	R16	21st	Exeter Eagles	Cons Quarters	29th	Oxford Quidlings	Cons R16
6th	Tornadoes QC	Quarters	14th	Swansea	R16	22nd	Cambridge	Cons Quarters	30th	Brizzlebees	Cons R16
7th	Warwick QC	Quarters	15th	Leicester	R16	23rd	Derby	Cons Quarters	31st	Durham Direwolves	Cons R16
8th	Keele squirrels	Quarters	16th	Bangor	R16	24th	Manchester	Cons quarters	32nd	Reading Rocs	Cons R16

== Fifth Tournament, March 2018 ==
The fifth British Quidditch Cup took place on 24–25 March 2018 at Brookes Sport Park at Oxford Brooks University. 32 teams competed, with the first day involving 8 groups of 4 teams each competing in a round-robin. The second day consisted of a knockout tournament in both an upper and lower bracket of 16 teams each. Velociraptors QC won the tournament, defeating Warwick Quidditch Club in the final with a catch to take the game into overtime followed by a second winning snitch catch. Werewolves of London won against Southampton Quidditch Club in the 3rd place play-off and Chester Centurions defeated Manchester Quidditch Club to win the consolation bracket final.

=== Final standings ===
Position	Team	Stage	Position	Team	Stage	Position	Team	Stage	Position	Team	Stage
1st	Velociraptors	Final	9th	York Horntails	R16	17th	Chester Centurions	Cons Final	25th	Leicester Thestrals	Cons R16
2nd	Warwick QC	Final	10th	Loughborough Longshots	R16	18th	Manchester Manticores	Cons final	26th	Portsmouth Strikers	Cons R16
3rd	Werewolves of London Firsts	Semis	11th	Nottingham Nightmares	R16	19th	Swansea Swans	Cons Semis	27th	Bristol Bees	Cons R16
4th	Southampton QC Firsts	Semis	12th	Falmouth Falcons	R16	20th	Durhamstrang	Cons Semis	28th	Holyrood Hippogriffs Seconds	Cons R16
5th	London Unspeakables	Quarters	13th	Exeter Eagles	R16	21st	Liverpuddly Cannons	Cons Quarters	29th	Southampton QC Seconds	Cons R16
6th	Bristol Bears	Quarters	14th	Tornadoes QC	R16	22nd	Keele Squirrels	Cons Quarters	30th	Cambridge University QC	Cons R16
7th	Radcliffe Chimeras	Quarters	15th	Sheffield Squids	R16	23rd	Reading Knights	Cons Quarters	31st	Bournemouth Banshees	Cons R16
8th	Holyrood Hippogriffs Firsts	Quarters	16th	Leeds Griffins	R16	24th	Bangor Broken Broomsticks	Cons quarters	32nd	Sheffield Steelfins	Cons R16

== Sixth Tournament, April 2019 ==
The sixth British Quidditch Cup took place on 6–7 April 2019 at Northumbria Sport in Newcastle. 32 teams competed, with the first day involving 8 groups of 4 teams each competing in a round-robin. The second day consisted of a knockout tournament in both an upper and lower bracket with 16 teams in each. London Quidditch Club won the tournament.

=== Knockout stage results ===
==== Upper Bracket ====
Round of 16
London Quidditch Club	270*
Winchester Quidditch Club	10
Nottingham Nightmares	60
London Unspeakables	110*
Velociraptors	150*
Werewolves of London Seconds	0
Oxford Mammoths	50
Liverpuddly Cannons	70*
Werewolves of London Firsts	230*
Bath Quidditch Club	0*
Megalodons	120*
Manchester Manticores	70
Southampton Quidditch Club	190*
Exeter Eagles	80
Glasgow Grim Reapers	60
Holyrood Hippogriffs Firsts	130*

Quarter-finals
London Quidditch Club	170*
London Unspeakables	10
Velociraptors	180*
Liverpuddly Cannons	30
Werewolves of London Firsts	170*
Megalodons	20
Southampton Quidditch Club	130*
Holyrood Hippogriffs Firsts	70

Semi-finals
London Quidditch Club	180*
Velociraptors	70
Werewolves of London Firsts	130*
Southampton Quidditch Club	20

Final
London Quidditch Club	160*
Werewolves of London Firsts	70
Third place
Velociraptors	150*
Southampton Quidditch Club	40

==== Lower Bracket ====
Round of 16
Derby Daemons	50*
Holyrood Hippogriffs Seconds	80
Warwick Quidditch Club	130*
Bournemouth Banshees	60
Tornadoes Quidditch Club	70
Leeds Griffins	170*
Bristol Bears	130*
Chester Centurions	40
St Andrews Snidgets	60
York Horntails	130*
Oxford Radcliffe Chimeras	20
London Unstoppables	90*
Leicester Thestrals	100*
Swansea Swans	20

Quarter-finals
Durhamstrang	130*
Holyrood Hippogriffs Seconds	50
Warwick Quidditch Club	90*
Leeds Griffins	30
Bristol Bears	80
York Horntails	90*
London Unstoppables	40
Leicester Thestrals	80*

Semi-finals
Durhamstrang	40
Warwick Quidditch Club	90*
York Horntails	40
Leicester Thestrals	190*

Final
Warwick Quidditch Club	70*
Leicester Thestrals	30

=== Final standings ===
Position	Team	Stage	Position	Team	Stage	Position	Team	Stage	Position	Team	stage
1st	London QC A	Final	9th	Oxford Mammoths	R16	17th	Warwick QC	Cons Final	25th	Radcliffe Chimeras	Cons R16
2nd	Werewolves of London Firsts	Final	10th	Glasgow Grim Reapers	R16	18th	Leicester Thestrals	Cons final	26th	Swansea Swans	Cons R16
3rd	Velociraptors	Semis	11th	Nottingham Nightmares	R16	19th	Durhamstrang	Cons Semis	27th	Bournemouth Banshees	Cons R16
4th	Southampton QC Firsts	Semis	12th	Manchester Manticores	R16	20th	York Horntails	Cons Semis	28th	St Andrews Snidgets	Cons R16
5th	London Unspeakables	Quarters	13th	Werewolves of London Seconds	R16	21st	Bristol Bears	Cons Quarters	29th	Derby Daemons	Cons R16
6th	Megalodons	Quarters	14th	Exeter Eagles	R16	22nd	Holyrood Hippogriffs Seconds	Cons Quarters	30th	Chester Centurions	Cons R16
7th	Holyrood Hippogriffs Firsts	Quarters	15th	Bath QC	R16	23rd	Leeds Griffins	Cons Quarters	31st	Tornadoes QC	Cons R16
8th	Liverpuddly Cannons	Quarters	16th	Winchester Wampus	R16	24th	London Unstoppables	Cons quarters			

== Seventh Tournament, April 2022 ==
Due to COVID-19, the planned British Quidditch Cup for 2020 was cancelled. In addition plans to host an equivalent event to BQC in April 2021 were shelved due to it being deemed unsafe and impractical. The seventh tournament took place on 9–10 April 2022 at the Sheffield Hallam Sports Centre in Sheffield. This tournament was the first to use a new format and reduced total number of teams of 24 (down from 32). The new format saw university and community teams competing separately, as such 12 of the slots for the tournament were available for community teams and the other 12 slots were available for university teams. 8 of the university slots were available to teams in the Northern region, with the other 4 for teams in the Southern region. The tournament was an opt-in tournament for community teams, whereas for university teams qualification was determined via the final rankings in each region after all Northern and Southern fixtures.

During the actual tournament, 22 teams competed (11 university teams and 11 community teams). In each competition the teams were competed within 3 groups, two of four teams each and one of three teams, before proceeding to a knockout tournament. The structure was set-up such that each team was guaranteed at least two games each day and at least five across the whole tournament. This was done by having a three-team round robin for losing teams from the round of 16 knockout stage and a consolation bracket for losing teams from the quarter final stage on top of a 3rd place play-off.

The winner of the university tournament was Southampton QC and the winner of the community tournament was Werewolves of London Firsts, with the results of the tournament as follows.

=== University tournament ===
11 university teams competed across 3 groups before going into a knockout tournament. The university final was won by Southamptom QC against Exeter Eagles, coming down to both teams being one goal away from the set score of 130 before Southampton scored.

==== Group stage results ====
===== Group 1 =====
Team 1	Score	Team 2	Game Length
Sheffield Quidditch Club	50 – 80*	York Horntails	19:09
Southampton QC	140 – 70*	Manchester Universities QC	22:53
Southampton QC	60 – 40*	Sheffield Quidditch Club	18:25
Manchester Universities QC	100* – 80	York Horntails	22:44
Manchester Universities QC	160 – 110*	Sheffield Quidditch Club	44:30 (OT)
Southampton QC	150* – 30	York Horntails	19:47

===== Group 2 =====
Team 1	Score	Team 2	Game Length
Leicester Thestrals	130 – 60*	Leeds Griffins	24:39
Stirling Dumyat Dragons	50* – 150	Oxford Universities QC	26:48 (OT)
Leicester Thestrals	180 – 40*	Stirling Dumyat Dragons	19:34 (OT)
Leeds Griffins	70 – 110*	Oxford Universities QC	18:00
Leicester Thestrals	120 – 70*	Oxford Universities QC	19:48
Leeds Griffins	140* – 40	Stirling Dumyat Dragons	22:46

===== Group 3 =====
Team 1	Score	Team 2	Game Length
Liverpool Quidditch Club	90 – 140*	Exeter Eagles	28:13
Liverpool Quidditch Club	50 – 100*	Warwick Quidditch Club	18:48
Exeter Eagles	50 – 70*	Warwick Quidditch Club	18:14

==== Knockout stage results ====
Round of 16
Oxford Universities Quidditch Club	100
Stirling Dumyat Dragons	60*
Leeds Griffins	30
Sheffield Quidditch Club	90*
York Horntails	100
Liverpool Quidditch Club	130*

Quarter-finals
Warwick Quidditch Club	90*
Oxford Universities Quidditch Club	60
Southampton Quidditch Club	130*
Sheffield Quidditch Club	10
Exeter Eagles	180*
Manchester Universities QC	10
Leicester Thestrals	100
Liverpool Quidditch Club	80*

Semi-finals
Southampton Quidditch Club	110*
Warwick Quidditch Club	60
Exeter Eagles	70*
Leicester Thestrals	20

Final
Southampton Quidditch Club	130*
Exeter Eagles	120
Third place
Warwick Quidditch Club	50*
Leicester Thestrals	100

Consolation Semi-final
Sheffield Quidditch Club	50
Oxford Universities Quidditch Club	110*
Manchester Universities QC	130
Liverpool Quidditch Club	140*

5th place play-off
N/A – Liverpool forfeited the match
7th place play-off
Manchester Universities QC	10
Sheffield Quidditch Club	120*

9th/10th/11th place round-robin
Team 1	Score	Team 2
York Horntails	140* – 80	Stirling Dumyat Dragons
Leeds Griffins	160 – 70*	Stirling Dumyat Dragons
York Horntails	140* – 70	Leeds Griffins

==== Final standings ====
Position	Team	Stage
1st	Southampton Quidditch Club	Final
2nd	Exeter Eagles	Final
3rd	Leicester Thestrals	Semis
4th	Warwick Quidditch Club	Semis
5th	Oxford Universities QC	Quarters
6th	Liverpool Quidditch Club	Quarters
7th	Sheffield Quidditch Club	Quarters
8th	Manchester Universities QC	Quarters
9th	York Horntails	Round of 16
10th	Leeds Griffins	Round of 16
11th	Stirling Dumyat Dragons	Round of 16

=== Community tournament ===
Werewolves of London Firsts won the community tournament, defeating London Quidditch Club in the final. After the full 45 minutes of game time in the final the teams were tied with 160 points each, both a single goal away from the winning overtime set score of 170 (Werewolves had caught the snitch earlier in the match). Under concern that the venue was already starting to kick the tournament out with the university final still yet to be played (and in an attempt to avoid going to tiebreakers for a final), it was decided to play two more minutes of golden goal during which Werewolves scored and won the tournament.

==== Group stage results ====
===== Group 1 =====
Team 1	Score	Team 2	Game Length
Werewolves of London Firsts	130* – 10	London Unspeakables	19:21
East Midlands Vipers	60 – 90*	Kelpies Quidditch Club	19:26
London Unspeakables	150* – 20	Kelpies Quidditch Club	18:43
Werewolves of London Firsts	220* – 10	East Midlands Vipers	18:22
London Unspeakables	200* – 30	East Midlands Vipers	20:57
Werewolves of London Firsts	220* – 20	Kelpies Quidditch Club	21:54

===== Group 2 =====
Team 1	Score	Team 2	Game Length
Velociraptors QC	200* – 40	Oxford Mammoths	18:22
Werewolves of London Seconds	100 – 50*	West Country Rebels	33:04
Oxford Mammoths	130 – 90*	West Country Rebels	28:22 (OT)
Velociraptors QC	180* – 20	Werewolves of London Seconds	20:37
Oxford Mammoths	90* – 40	Werewolves of London Seconds	18:13
Velociraptors QC	140 – 30*	West Country Rebels	18:50

===== Group 3 =====
Team 1	Score	Team 2	Game Length
Olympians Quidditch Club	150* – 30	Southsea Quidditch	27:26
London Quidditch Club	180* – 40	Southsea Quidditch	18:25
London Quidditch Club	160* – 40	Olympians Quidditch Club	18:11

==== Knockout stage results ====
Round of 16
Kelpies Quidditch Club	120*
East Midlands Vipers	80
Oxford Mammoths	40
Southsea Quidditch	100*
Werewolves of London Seconds	70*
West Country Rebels	0

Quarter-finals
London Quidditch Club	140
Kelpies Quidditch Club	50*
London Unspeakables	60
Olympians Quidditch Club	120*
Velociraptors QC	190
Southsea Quidditch	60*
Werewolves of London Firsts	150*
Werewolves of London Seconds	50

Semi-finals
London Quidditch Club	150*
Olympians Quidditch Club	0
Werewolves of London Firsts	140
Velociraptors QC	180*

Final
London Quidditch Club	160
Werewolves of London Firsts	170*
Third place
Olympians Quidditch Club	40
Velociraptors QC	150*

Consolation Semi-final
Werewolves of London Seconds	70*
Southsea Quidditch	90
Kelpies Quidditch Club	40
London Unspeakables	150*

5th place play-off
London Unspeakables	130*
Southsea Quidditch	10
7th place play-off
Werewolves of London Seconds	150*
Kelpies Quidditch Club	0

9th/10th/11th place round-robin
Team 1	Score	Team 2
East Midlands Vipers	80* – 20	West Country Rebels
Oxford Mammoths	130* – 20	East Midlands Vipers
Oxford Mammoths	190* – 40	West Country Rebels

==== Final standings ====
Position	Team	Stage
1st	Werewolves of London Firsts	Final
2nd	London Quidditch Club	Final
3rd	Velociraptors QC	Semis
4th	Olympians Quidditch Club	Semis
5th	London Unspeakables	Quarters
6th	Southsea Quidditch	Quarters
7th	Werewolves of London Seconds	Quarters
8th	Kelpies Quidditch Club	Quarters
9th	Oxford Mammoths	Round of 16
10th	East Midlands Vipers	Round of 16
11th	West Country Rebels	Round of 16

== Eighth Tournament, April 2023 ==
The eighth tournament took place on 1–2 April 2023 and was again held in Sheffield Hallam University Sports Park. This was the first tournament held under the 'Quadball' name. It was planned that 24 teams would compete, however only 22 actually competed (10 university and 12 community teams). The university flight was won by Warwick Quadball Club and the community flight was won by London Quadball Club.
