= Zimbalo =

- Francesco Antonio Zimbalo, Italian architect
- Giuseppe Zimbalo, Italian sculptor
