= Gallipoli Cathedral =

Catholic church in Apulia, Italy

- Co-Cathedral Basilica of Saint Agatha the Virgin
- Basilica Concattedrale di Sant'Agata Vergine (Italian)
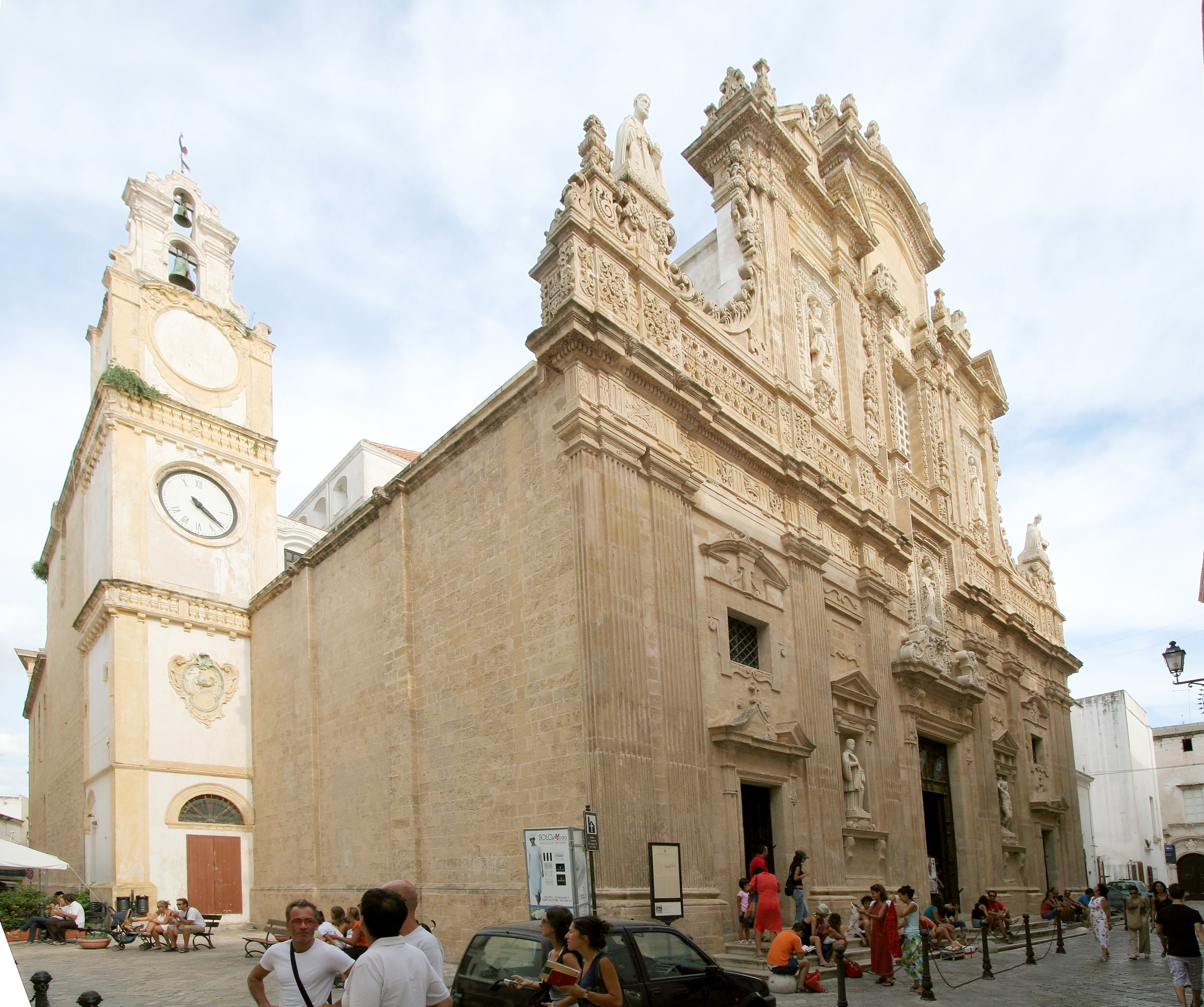
- Front and side of the cathedral
- Gallipoli Cathedral
- 40°03′17″N 17°58′34″E
- Location: Gallipoli, Apulia, Italy
- Denomination: Roman Catholic
- Website: www.cattedralegallipoli.it

History
- Status: Minor basilica, co-cathedral
- Dedication: Agatha of Sicily

Architecture
- Architects: Francesco Bischetini; Scipione Lachibari; Giuseppe Zimbalo
- Style: Baroque
- Groundbreaking: 1629
- Completed: 1696

Administration
- Diocese: Diocese of Nardò-Gallipoli

The Gallipoli Cathedral, formally the Co-Cathedral Basilica of Saint Agatha the Virgin (Italian: Basilica Concattedrale di Sant'Agata Vergine), is a Roman Catholic church located in the town of Gallipoli in Apulia, Italy. Completed in 1696, the Baroque church is a minor basilica and the co-cathedral of the Diocese of Nardò-Gallipoli.

== History ==
The Gallipoli Cathedral was constructed between 1629 and 1696, and is dedicated to Saint Agatha of Sicily.

== Architecture ==
The Baroque facade of the cathedral was designed by Giuseppe Zimbalo, Francesco Bischetini, and Scipione Lachibari. It is constructed out of carparo stone, sourced from Southern Italy. The church was built with a cruciform floorpan in the shape of a Latin cross.

== Interior ==
The interior of the church is a mixture of the Byzantine and Renaissance styles. The nave is flanked by columns of grey marble, which support an arcade. The interior is ornamented by paintings by Giovanni Andrea Coppola, a painter native to Gallipoli. Nicolò Malinconico painted the frescoes on the walls and in the cupola, which depicts the martyrdom of Saint Agatha.

The cathedral's altar is made of a reused Ancient Roman marble stele. There is an Ancient Greek inscription on the stele that reads:

[Δωρ]ον τιμαλφεστατον . . . πελω. / Εγω προσαχ[θεν τη]
τραπεζη τη ξενη / . . . ηπερ ην Μαρζηλιου / [ . . . τριφε]γγους
και τριφω[του . . .]. / Αυθις δε πει[σθεις τη προ]θυμια παση /
Μαγι[. . .]ου πατρωνος αμα και θυτου, / κυρις καθυφιζανεν
ευσεβοφρον(ως) / Παντολεων Προεδρος τουδε του θρονου.

Translated into English:

I am a most precious gift . . . I was placed on the remarkable altar . . . , which belonged
to Marsilios, three times glittering and three times luminous. Acceding to the ardent
desire of Magi . . . os, patron and priest, lord bishop Pantoleon, holder of this throne,
sits with great piety.

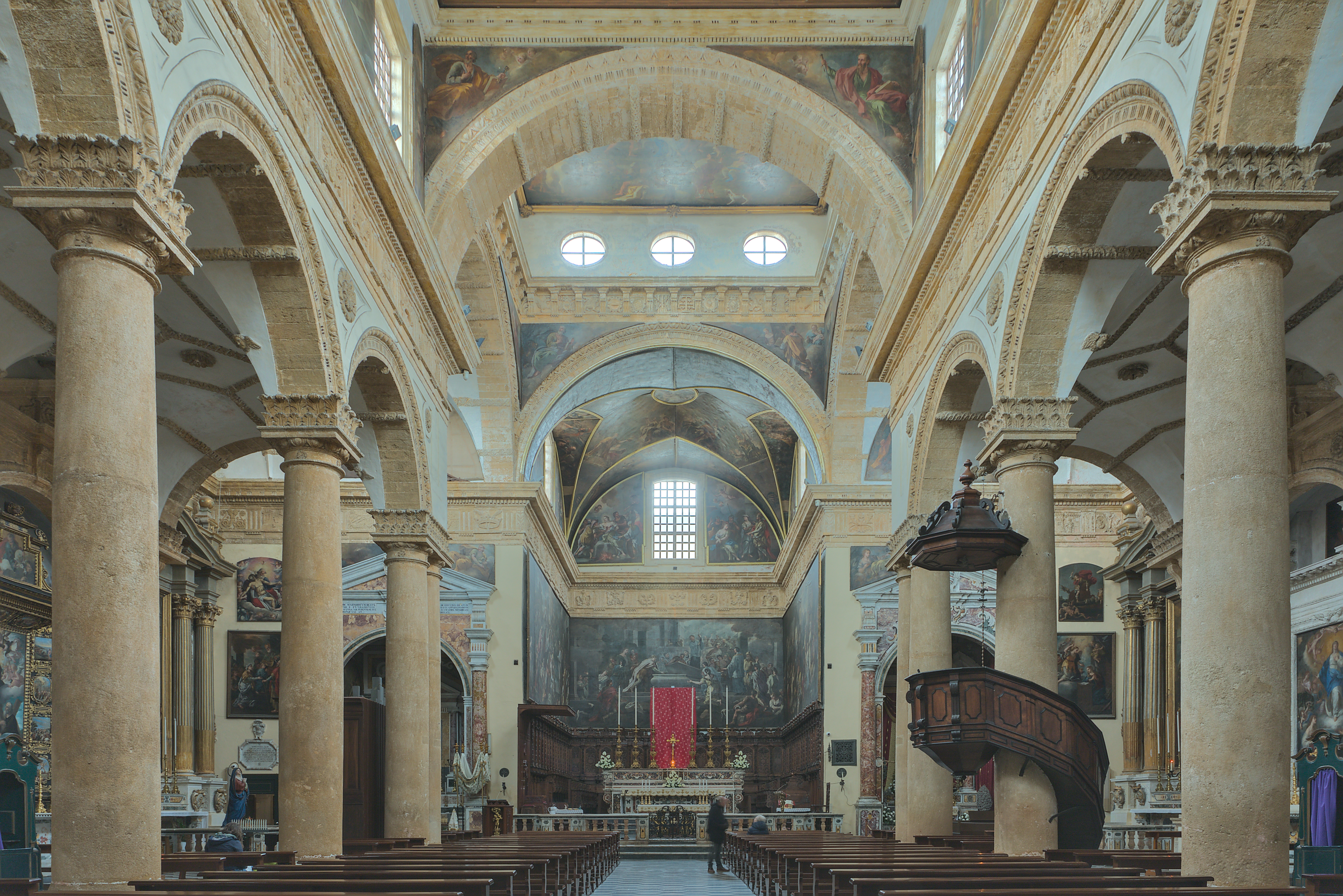
Nave and choir.

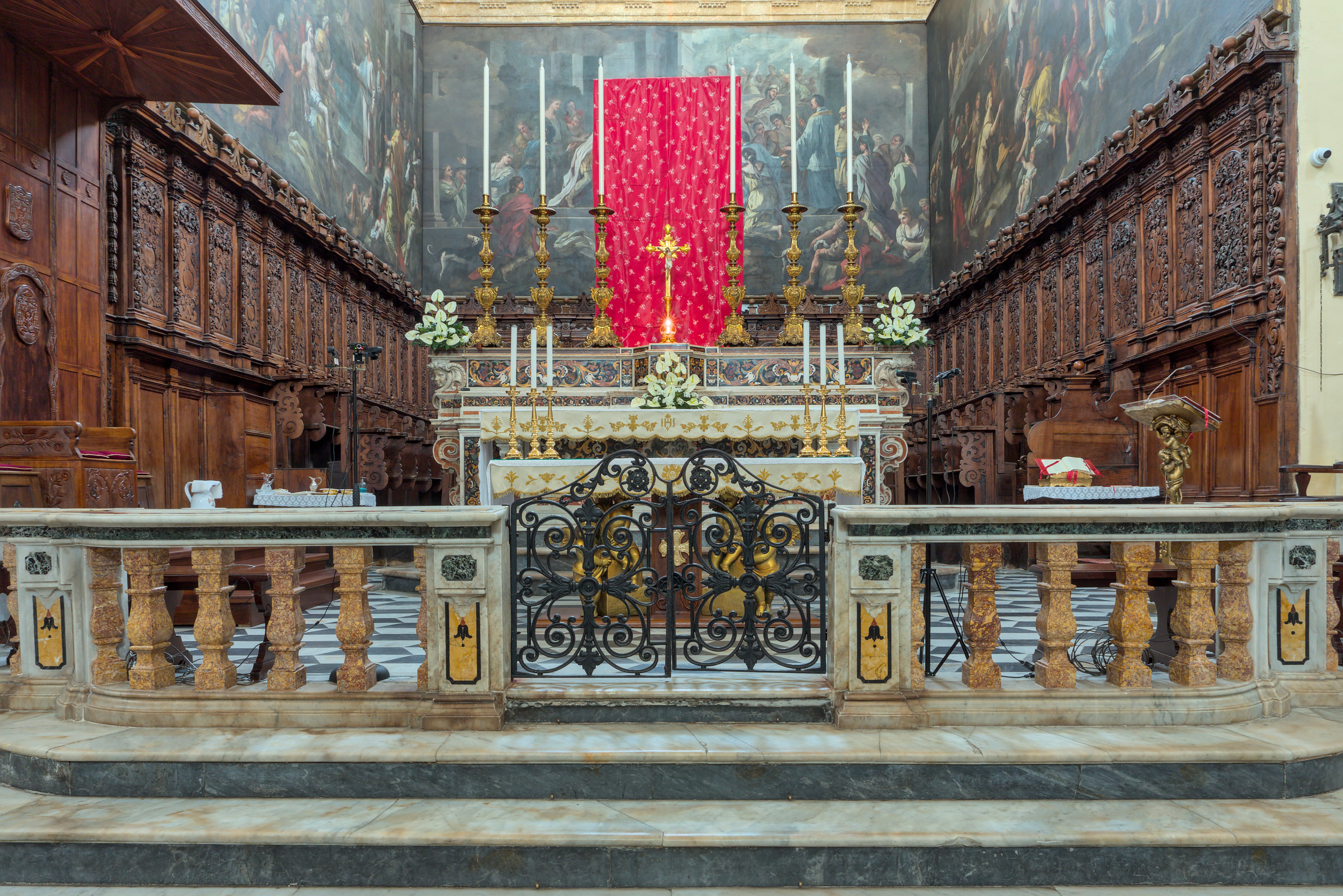
Choir.

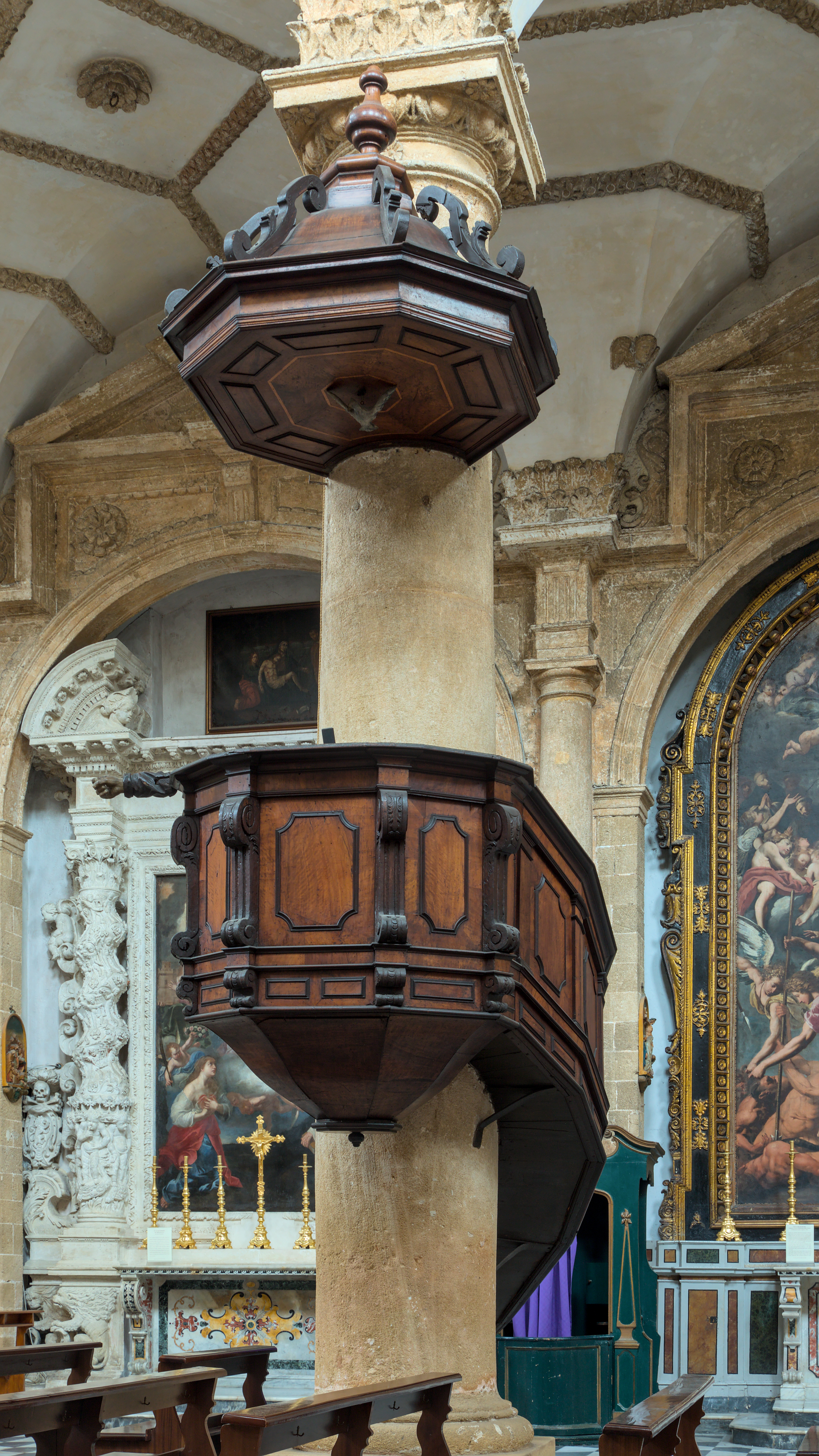
Pulpit.

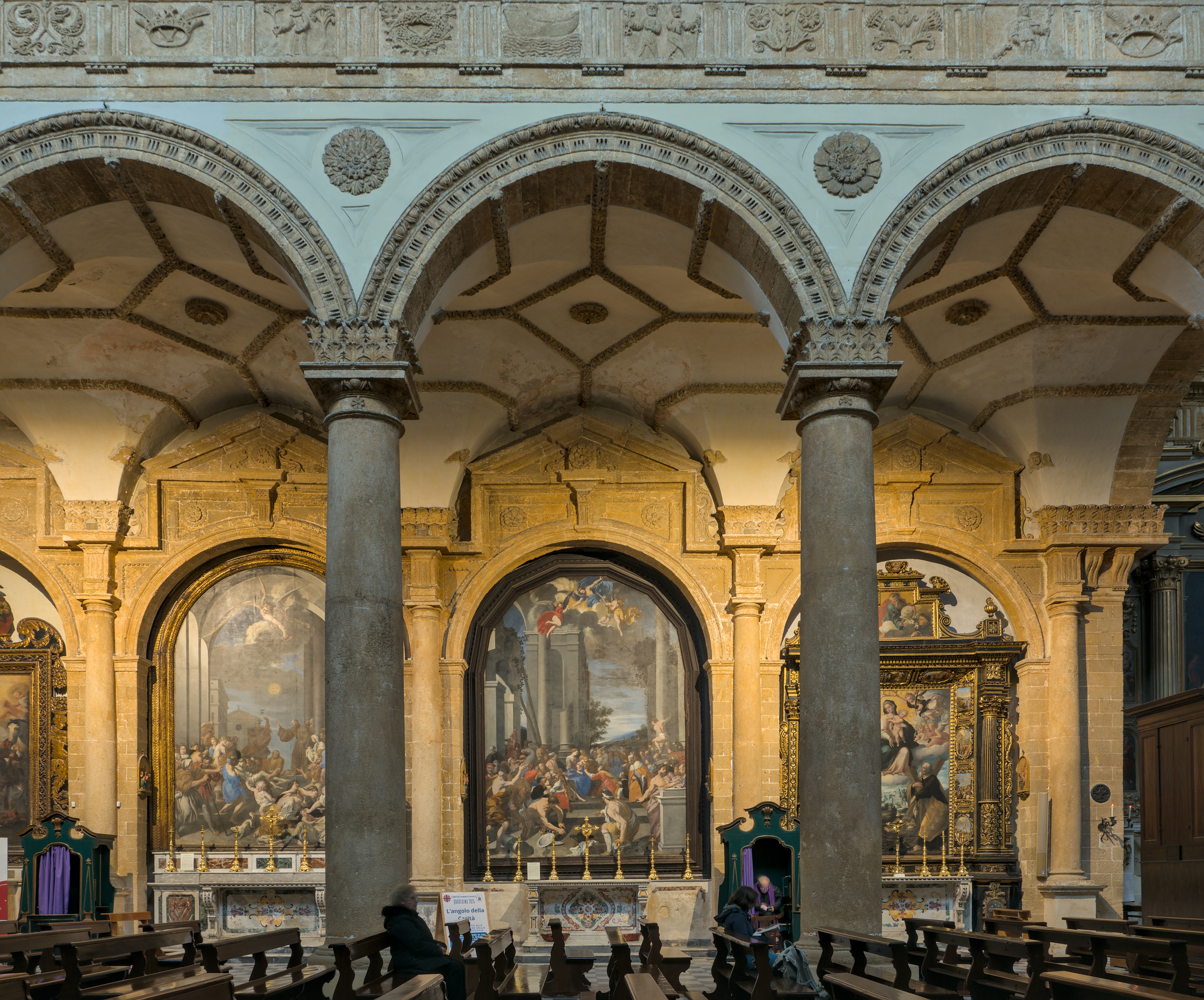
Left nave.

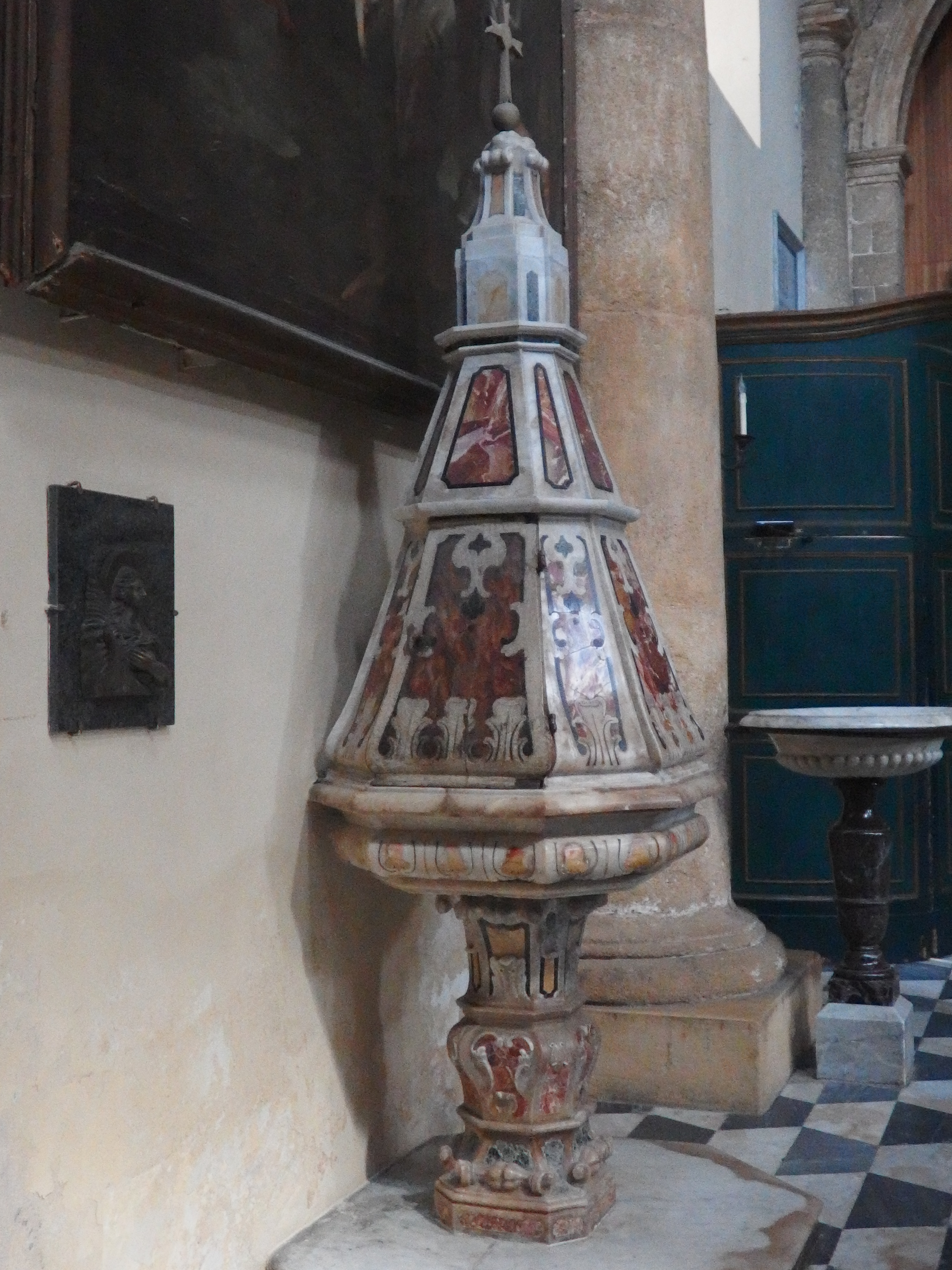
Baptismal fonts.

== See also ==
- Diocesan Museum of Gallipoli
