= Basilica of Santa Croce (disambiguation) =

Basilica of Santa Croce may refer to:

- Santa Croce, Florence
- Basilica of Santa Croce, Lecce
- Santa Croce in Gerusalemme
