= Gallipoli, Apulia =

Gallipoli Caḍḍìpuli (Sicilian) Καλλίπολις/Kallípolis (Greek)
- Comune
- Comune di Gallipoli
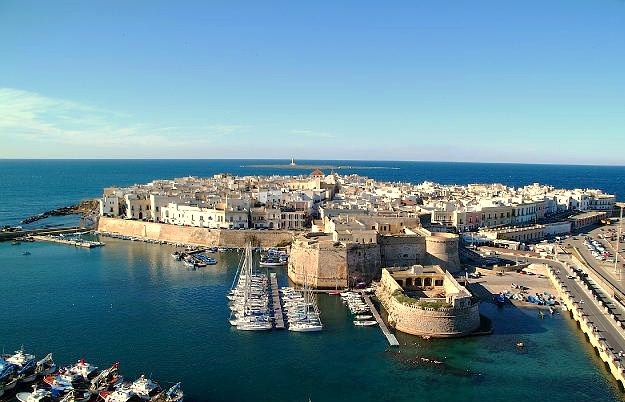
- Gallipoli panorama

- Coat of arms

- Gallipoli within the Province of Lecce

- Location within Italy Location within Apulia
- Coordinates: 40°03′20″N 17°59′30″E
- Country: Italy
- Region: Apulia
- Province: Lecce (LE)
- Frazioni: Baia Verde, Lido Conchiglie, Padula Bianca, Rivabella, Pizzo

Government
  - Mayor: Flavio Fasano

Area
  - Total: 41.22 km^{2} (15.92 sq mi)
- Elevation: 12 m (39 ft)

Population (31 October 2021)
  - Total: 19,536
  - Density: 473.9/km^{2} (1,228/sq mi)
- Demonym: Gallipolini
- Time zone: UTC+1 (CET)
  - Summer (DST): UTC+2 (CEST)
- Postal code: 73014
- Dialing code: 0833
- ISTAT code: 075031
- Patron saint: St. Sebastian, St. Agatha, St. Christine
- Saint day: January 20
- Website: Official website

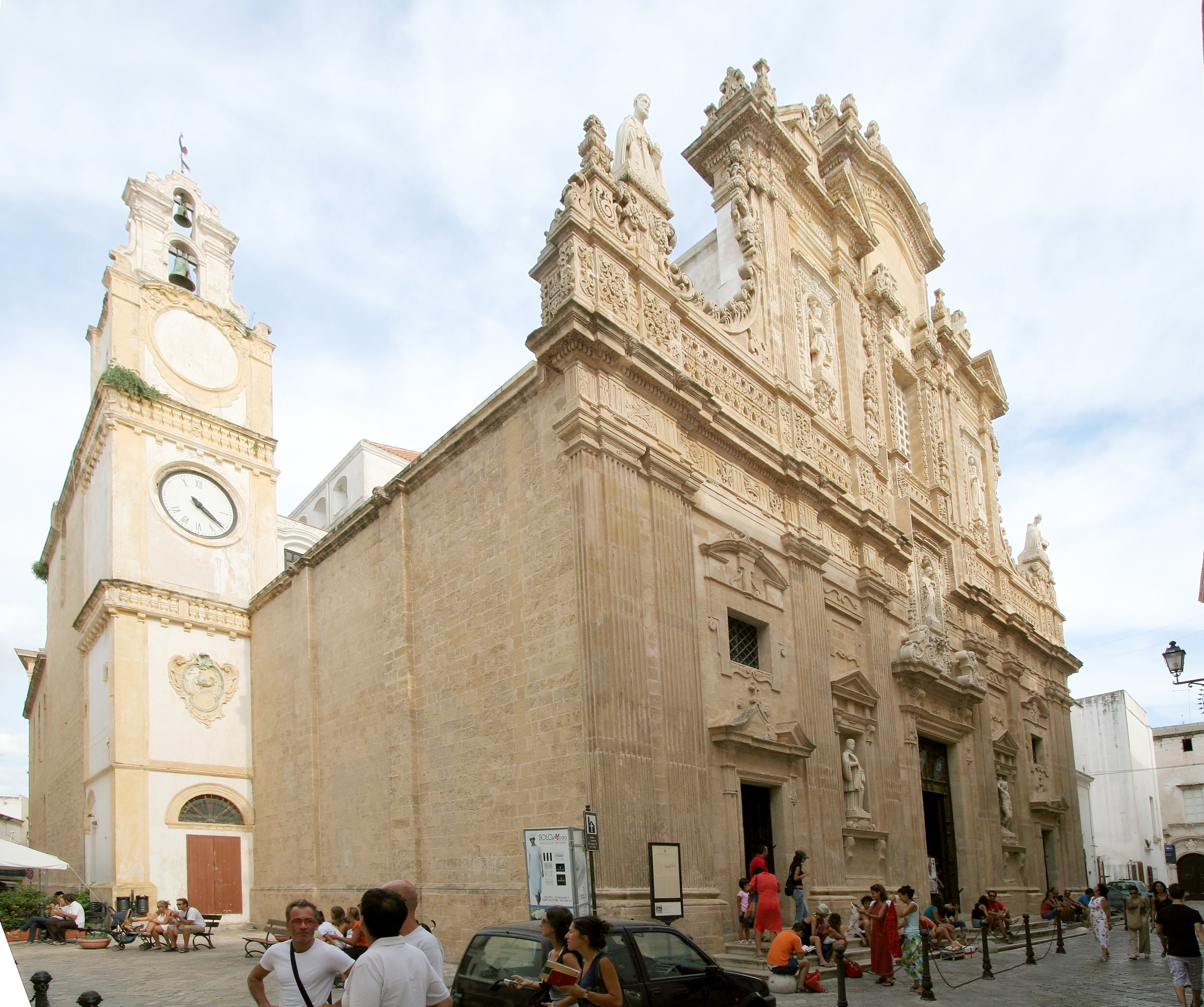
The Cathedral.

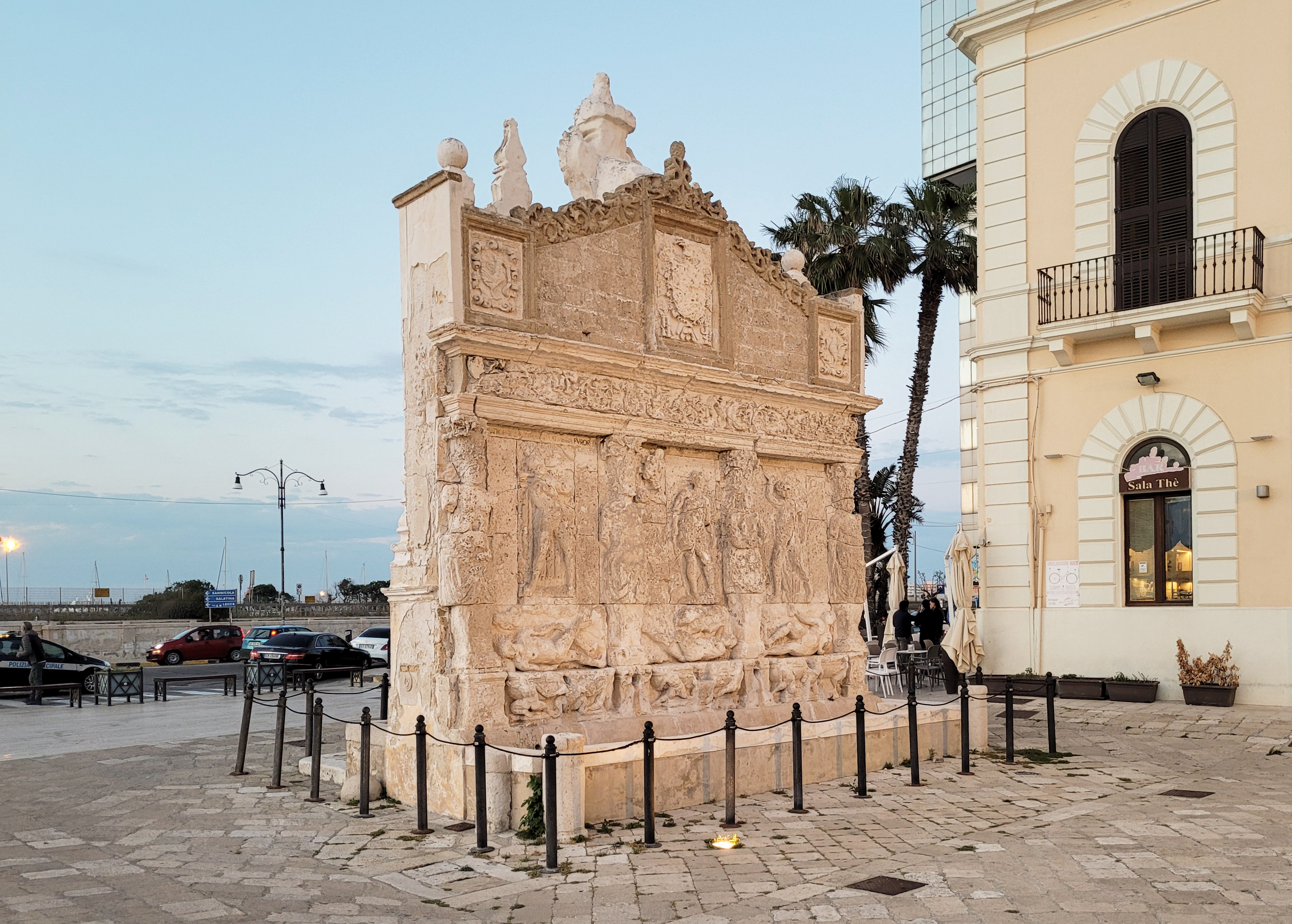
The "Greek" Fountain.

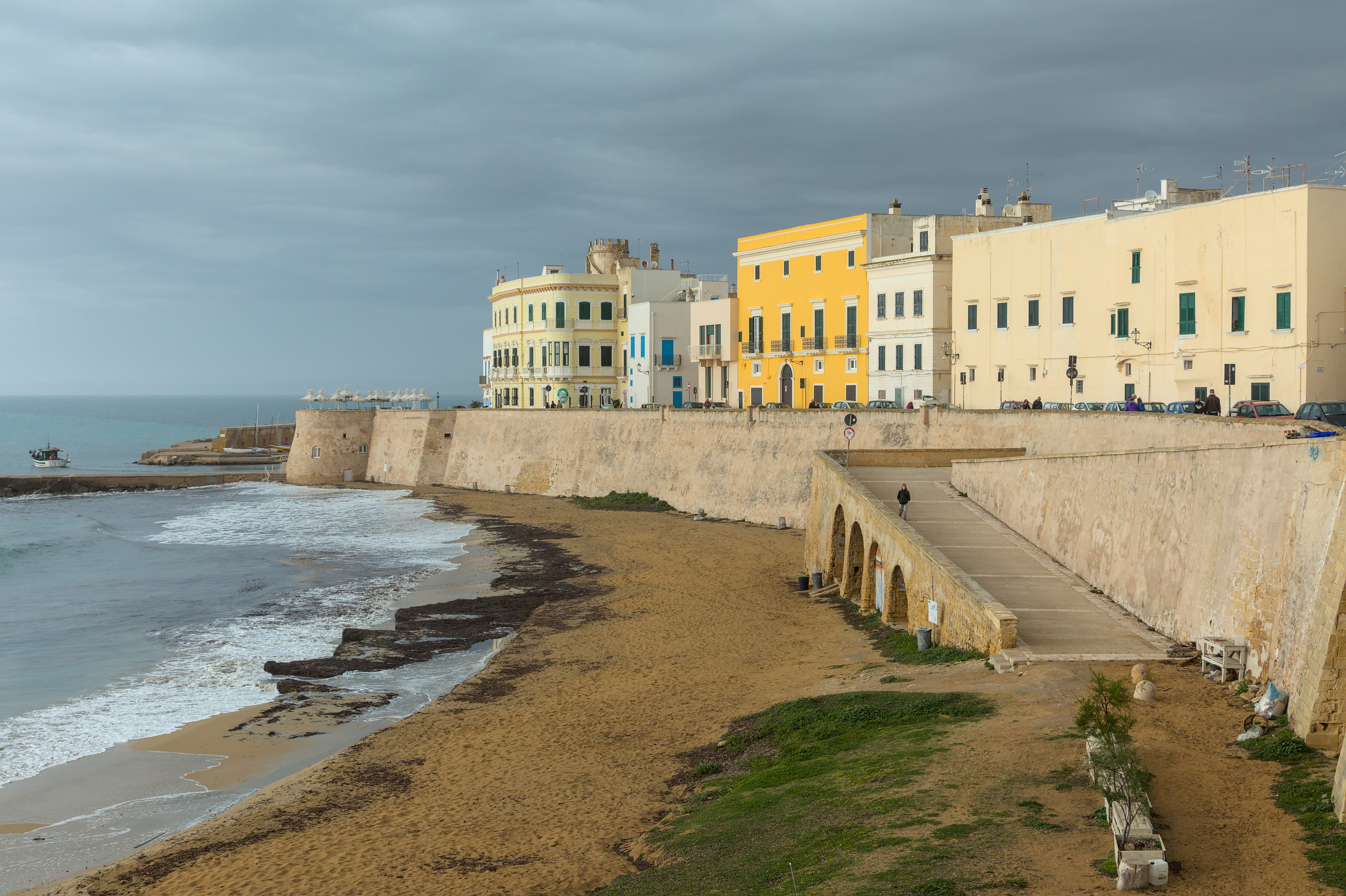
Spiaggia della Purità (Purity beach).

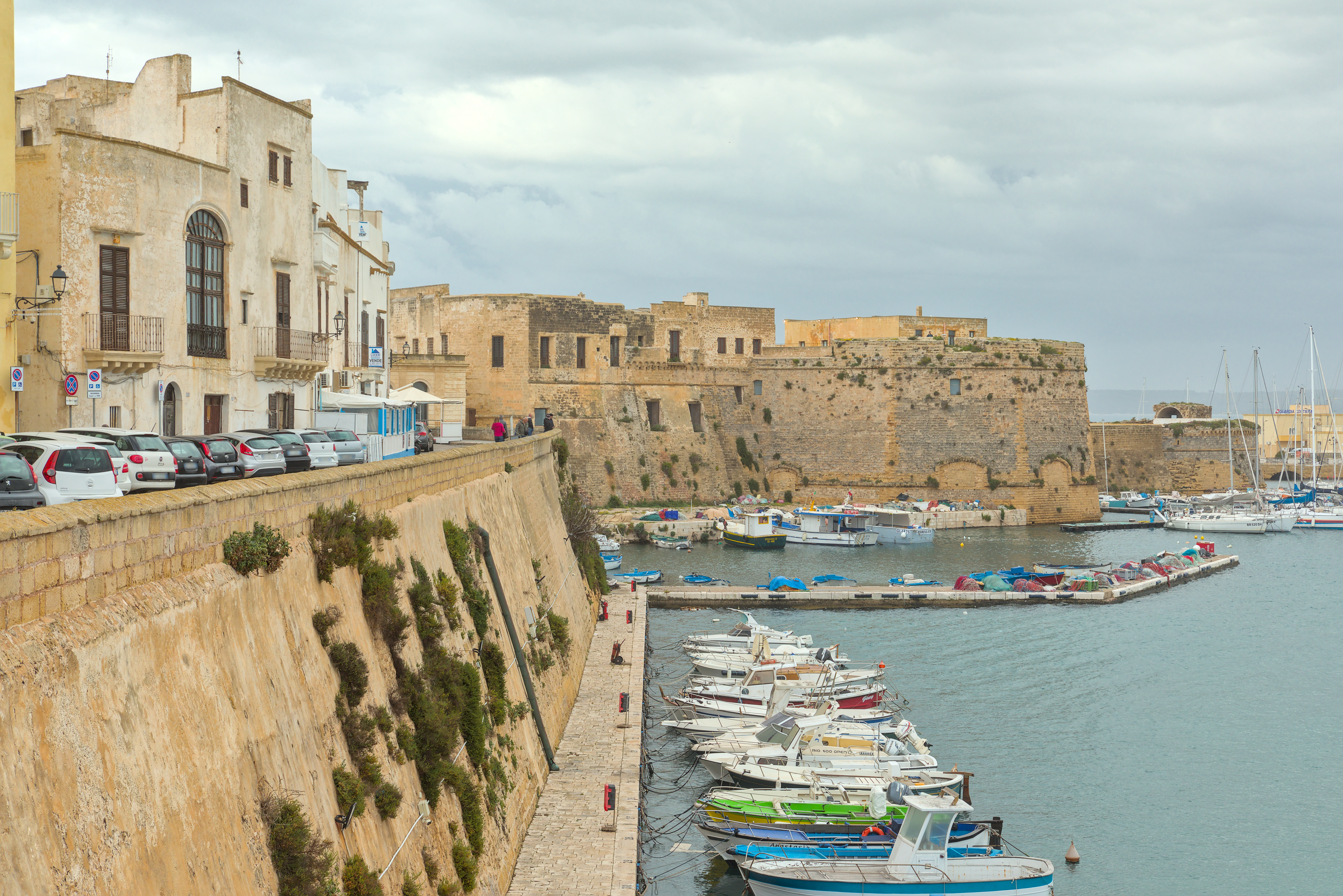
The southern harbor and the castle.

Gallipoli (Italian: [ɡalˈliːpoli]; Salentino: Caḍḍìpuli [kaɖˈɖiːpʊlɪ]; Ancient Greek: Καλλίπολις, romanized: Kallípolis, lit. 'Beautiful City') is a southern Italian town and comune (municipality) in the province of Lecce, in Apulia. In 2014, it had a population of 31,862 and is one of the towns where the Greek dialect Griko is spoken.

== Geography ==
The town is located on the Gulf of Taranto, a part of the Ionian Sea, on the west coast of the Salento Peninsula. The town of Gallipoli is divided into two parts, the modern and the old city. The new town includes all the newest buildings including a skyscraper. The old town is located on a limestone island, linked to the mainland by a bridge built in the 16th century.

The municipality borders with Alezio, Galatone, Matino, Sannicola, and Taviano. It counts the hamlets (frazioni) of Baia Verde, Lido Conchiglie, Rivabella, Padula Bianca, and Pizzo.

== History ==
According to a legend, the city was founded in ancient times by Idomeneus of Crete.

Dionysius of Halicarnassus described it as a seaport of Taranto, adding that Leucippus the Lacedaemonian and his followers arrived there after consulting an oracle that told them to settle wherever they would remain for a day and a night after landing. After reaching the area near Callipolis, Leucippus persuaded the Tarentines to let them encamp under that condition, but when several days had passed, the Tarentines asked them to leave, assuming the agreement had been fulfilled. Leucippus, however, argued that the condition was never exhausted because "day and night" continue endlessly, and therefore they were still within the terms of the oracle, so he refused to depart, and the Tarentines eventually allowed them to remain. Pomponius Mela referred to it as a Greek city. The 1911 Encyclopædia Britannica likewise considered the city to be of Greek origin. Pliny the Elder, noted that in his own time the city's name had been changed from Callipolis to Anxa.

Historically, what is known is that Gallipoli was a city of the Greater Greece, ruling over a large territory including today's Porto Cesareo. In 265 BC it sided with Pyrrhus and Taranto against ancient Rome, suffering a defeat which relegated it to a Roman colony (later a municipium).

In the early Middle Ages, it was most likely sacked by the Vandals and the Goths. Rebuilt by the Byzantines, Gallipoli lived an economically and socially flourishing period due to its geographical position. Later it was owned by the Roman Popes, and was a centre of fighting against the Greek monastic orders.

In the 11th century Gallipoli was conquered by the Normans and, in 1268, it was besieged by Charles I of Anjou, causing numerous inhabitants to flee to the nearby Alezio. The city was repopulated around 1300, under the feudal rule of the principality of Taranto. In 1484 the Venetians tried to occupy it, but without results. King Ferdinand I of the Two Sicilies started the construction of the port, which in the 18th century became the largest olive oil market in the Mediterranean.

After the unification of Italy (1861), Gallipoli was capital of a circondario, together with Lecce and Taranto.

== Main sights ==
- Angevine-Aragonese Castle, built in the 13th century by the Byzantines. It was largely remade under the Angevins and the Aragonese, who added a polygonal wall fortified with round towers. The main additions were carried on by Francesco di Giorgio Martini, who worked for King Alfonso II of Naples. In 1522 an eastern bastion, known as Rivellino, was built which is defended by waters on three sides.
- 14th century walls (renewed by the Spaniards in the 16th century). Originally they had 12 towers or bastions.
- Baroque Cathedral of Sant'Agata (17th century). It has a richly decorated façade in carparo, a local limestone, with niches featuring statues of saints. The interior is on the Latin cross plan, with Baroque altars, including a polychrome high altar by Cosimo Fanzago.
- Church of St. Francis of Paola (1621)
- Church of St. Francis of Assisi, built in the 13th century but renovated several times later. It is home to a stone nativity scene by Stefano da Putignano (late 16th century)
- Church of San Domenico al Rosario (late 17th century), annexed to a former Dominican convent.
- Church of the Holy Crucifix (1750)
- Church of Santa Maria della Purità (1661). The richly decorated interior houses, at the marble high altar, a canvas by Luca Giordano depicting the Madonna della Purità between st. Joseph and St. Francis of Assisi.
- Greek Fountain (16th century), once believed to date to the 3rd century BC. It has bas-reliefs with mythological figures and, on the other façade, the insignia of Charles III of Spain.
- Palazzo Pirelli (16th century), with mythological-theme decorations in the vault of former entrance archway which was converted to a pharmacy in the 19th century.
- Church of San Pietro dei Samari, outside the city. It was built in by a Crusader knight, Ugo di Lusignano in 1148.
- Spiaggia la Puritate beach under the city walls.

== Transportation ==
Nearest airports are Brindisi, 88 kilometres (55 mi), and Bari, 200 kilometres (120 mi). Gallipoli can be reached from both of them via a freeway, the state road 101.

By train, it is connected to Lecce by the Ferrovie Sud-Est.

== Economy ==
In past times the economy of Gallipoli was based on the international wine and oil commerce. Nowadays its most important activities are based on fishing and tourism.

Tourism is enjoyable throughout the year, due to the mild climate. Numerous festivals, both civil and religious, are also held. These include the Carnival, Easter and all the parades, Sant'Agata, and the Santa Cristina celebrations in July.

Gallipoli also boasts a very recently built harbour for private boats, located just steps from the bottom of the main Corso Roma.

The summer season starts in May and ends in October, when the weather is almost invariably hot and clear.

== LGBT culture ==
A sophisticated gay scene has developed around Gallipoli, often referred to as “Gay-lipoli”. The city is particularly well known as a destination for the Italian gay population, and has become “Italy’s gay summer paradise”. A vibrant nightlife means Gallipoli draws an international gay crowd over the summer months, with visitors also being drawn by the nearby naturist beaches and the popular lidos at Baia Verde. it's a very discreet presence mixing harmoniously with the other holiday makers in a seamless manner.

== Sport ==
The local football team is the Gallipoli Calcio. The team won the 2005–06 Serie C2/C championship. They were promoted to Serie B for the first time in the club's short history after winning the 2008–09 Serie C1/B championship, although were instantly relegated and then refounded due to financial issues.

== International relations ==
Gallipoli is twinned with:

- Monfalcone, Friuli-Venezia Giulia, Italy
- Catania, Sicily, Italy

== See also ==
- Roman Catholic Diocese of Gallipoli
- Roman Catholic Diocese of Nardò-Gallipoli
- Diocesan Museum of Gallipoli (Italy)
- Isola Sant'Andrea Lighthouse
