= Lecce Cathedral =

Coordinates: 40°21′N 18°10′E

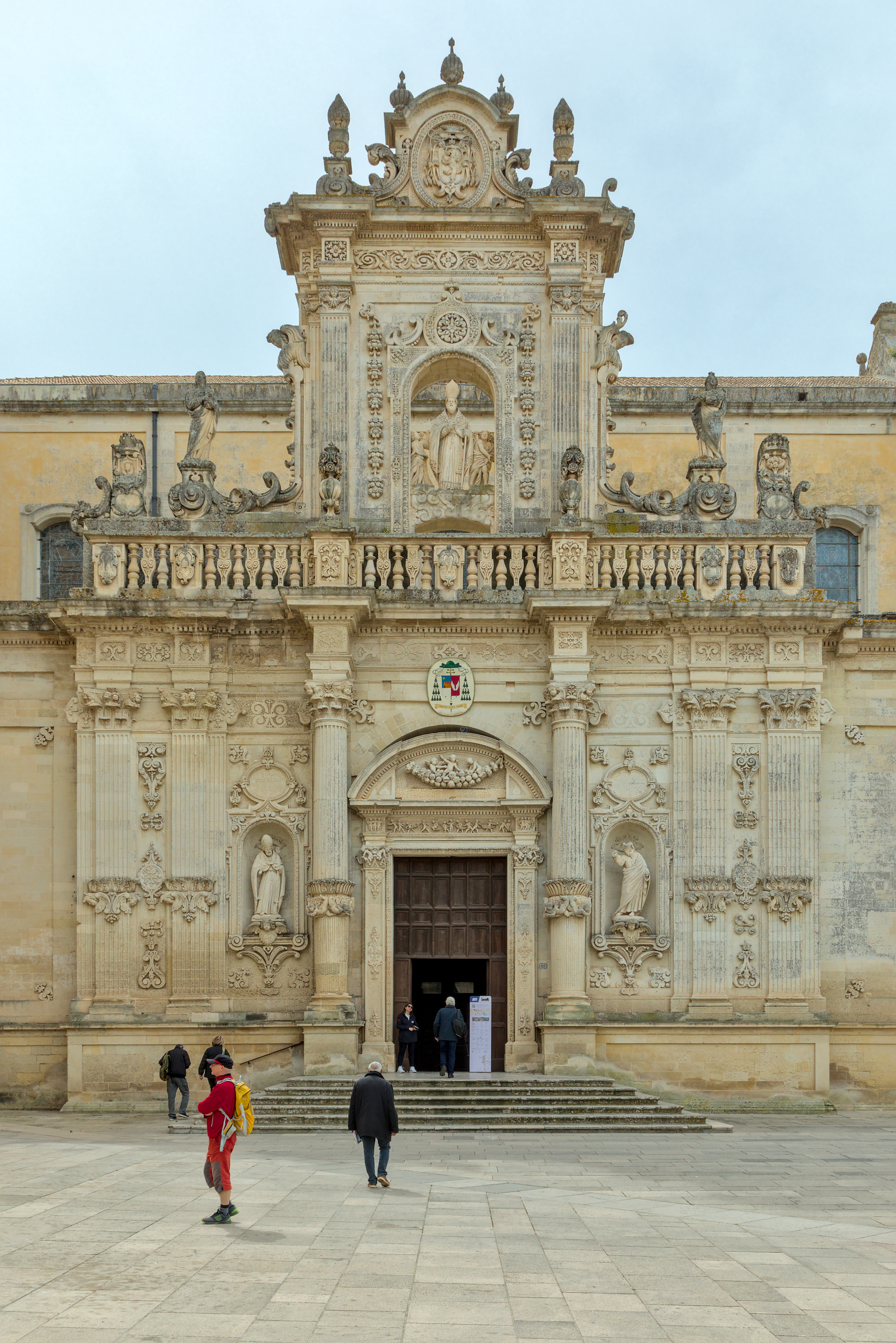
- Northern façade
- Lecce Cathedral
- Location: Lecce, Apulia
- Country: Italy
- Denomination: Catholicism of the Roman Rite
- Website: cattedraledilecce.it

History
- Founded: 1144

Architecture
- Architect: Giuseppe Zimbalo
- Style: Lecce Baroque
- Completed: 1689

Administration
- Archdiocese: Lecce

Lecce Cathedral (Italian: Duomo di Lecce; Cattedrale dell'Assunzione della Virgine) is the cathedral of the city of Lecce in Apulia, Italy, dedicated to the Assumption of the Virgin Mary. It is the seat of the Archbishop of Lecce.

== History ==
The cathedral was first built in 1144, but underwent repairs in 1230. It was rebuilt in 1659 by the architect Giuseppe Zimbalo by order of bishop Luigi Pappacoda, whose remains are kept in the altar dedicated to Saint Orontius of Lecce, the patron saint of the city.

== Description ==
=== Location and Exterior ===
The cathedral is located in the center of the city of Lecce and sits on the southeast corner of the Piazza del Duomo. It is accessible from the piazza through two entrances, one on the north side of the building and another on the west side. The cathedral shares the piazza with other buildings, including the bell tower, the bishop's residence, and the seminary.

The principal entrance is found on the northern façade, which is considered to be a masterpiece of Baroque art. At the center is the portal, accessible by a cascading staircase. Flanking the portal are two massive columns on square bases, outside of which are niches containing statues of Saint Giusto (on the right) and Saint Fortunato (on the left). The entablature, sitting directly above the portal, is crowned by a high balustrade alternating with columns and pilasters, above which, in the center and standing within a grand and highly decorated arch, is a statue of Saint Orontius. The western entrance, found directly across from the archbishop's residence, is divided by fluted pilasters into three vertical sections corresponding to the three naves of the interior. Statues of Peter and Paul flank the entrance. Part of the right side of the façade is covered by an adjacent diocesan building.

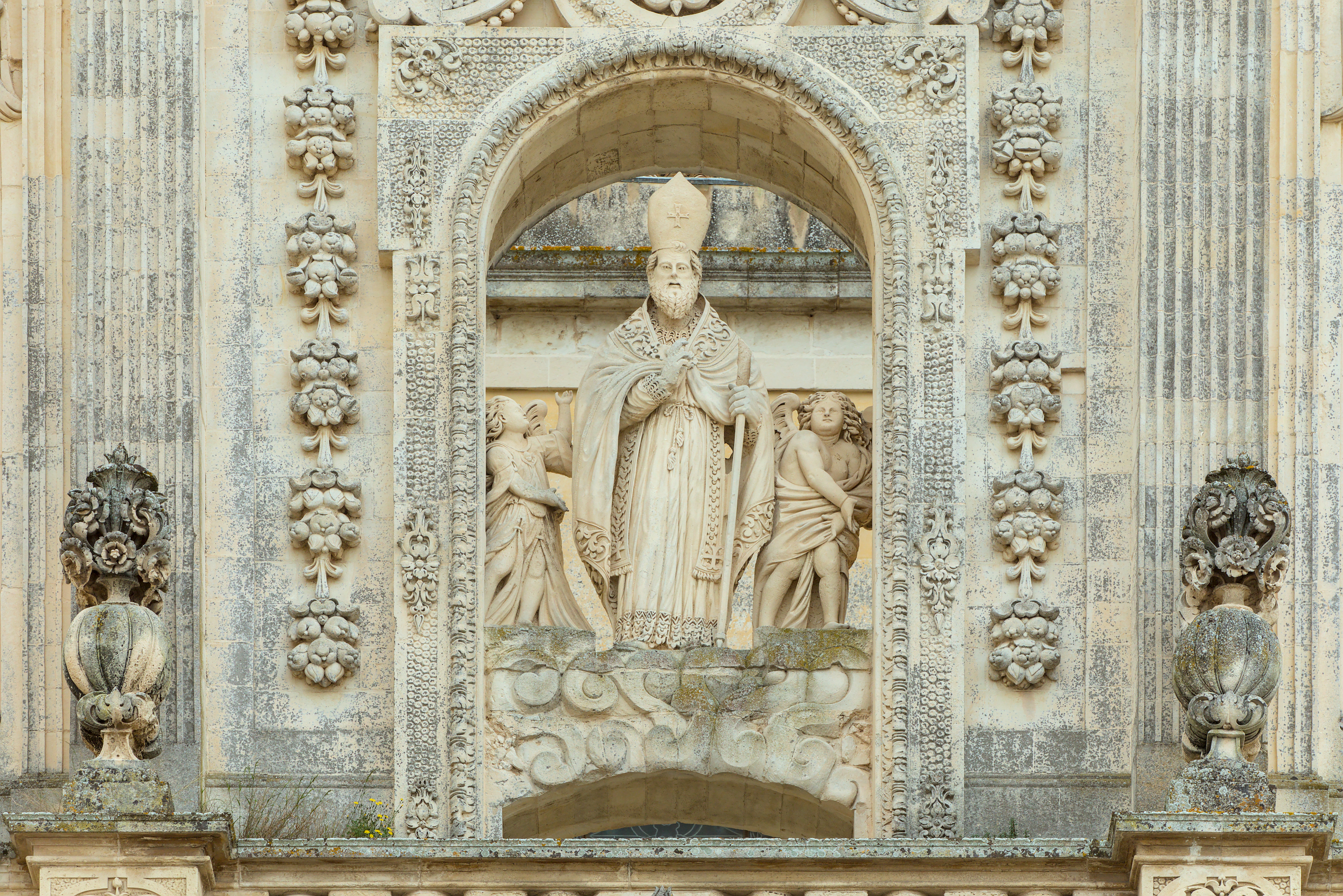
Details of the Northern façade

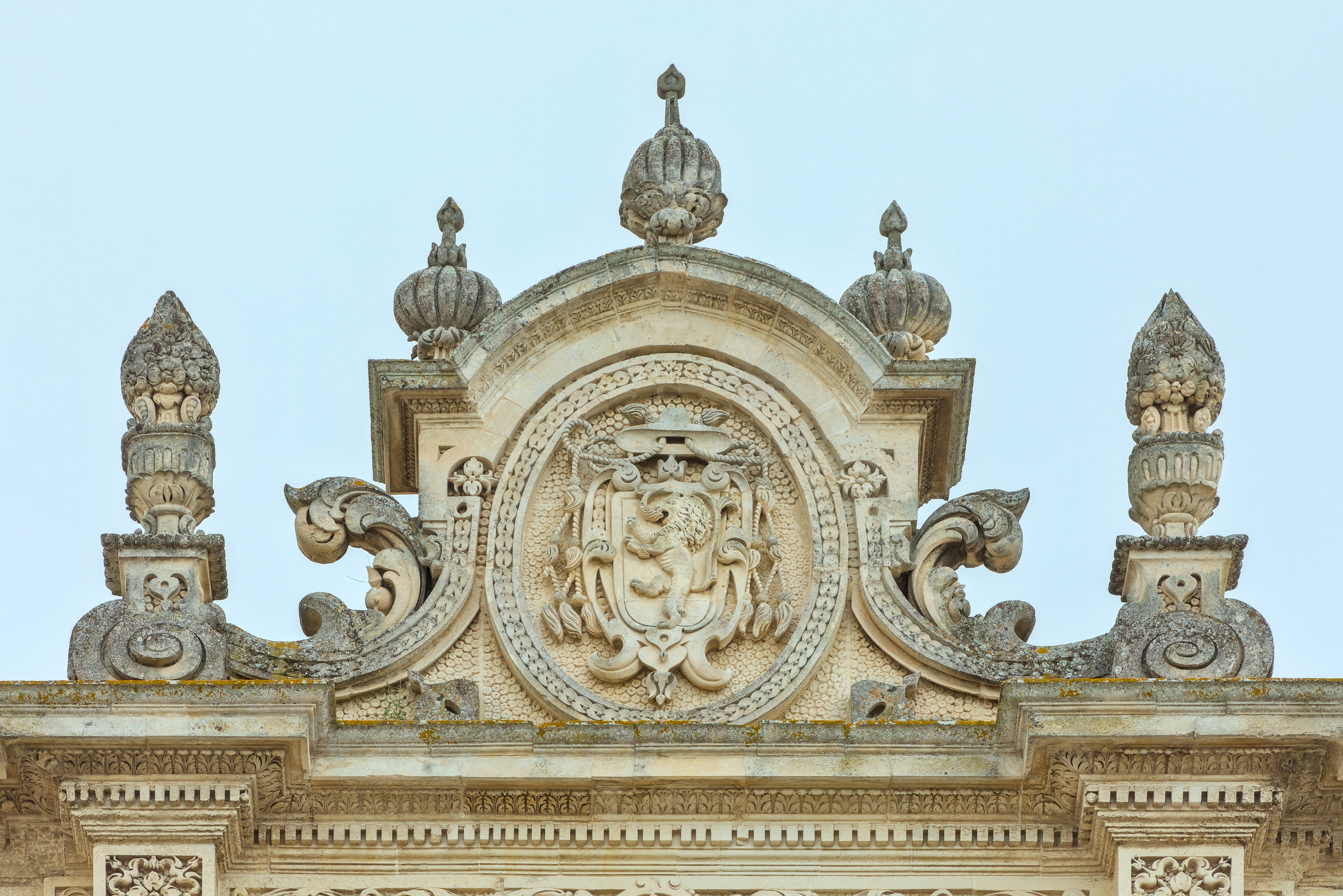
Pediment of the Northern façade

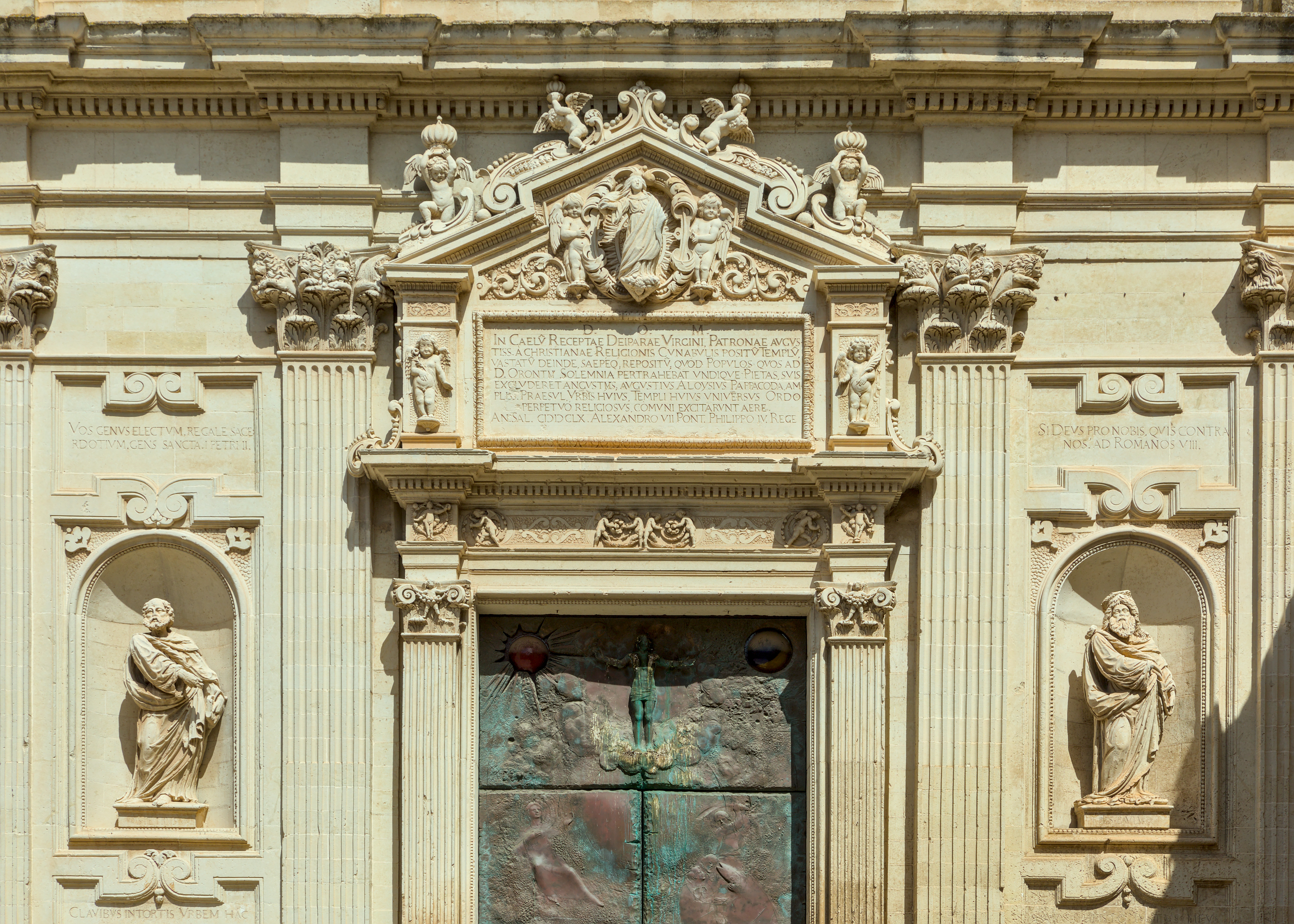
The Western portal

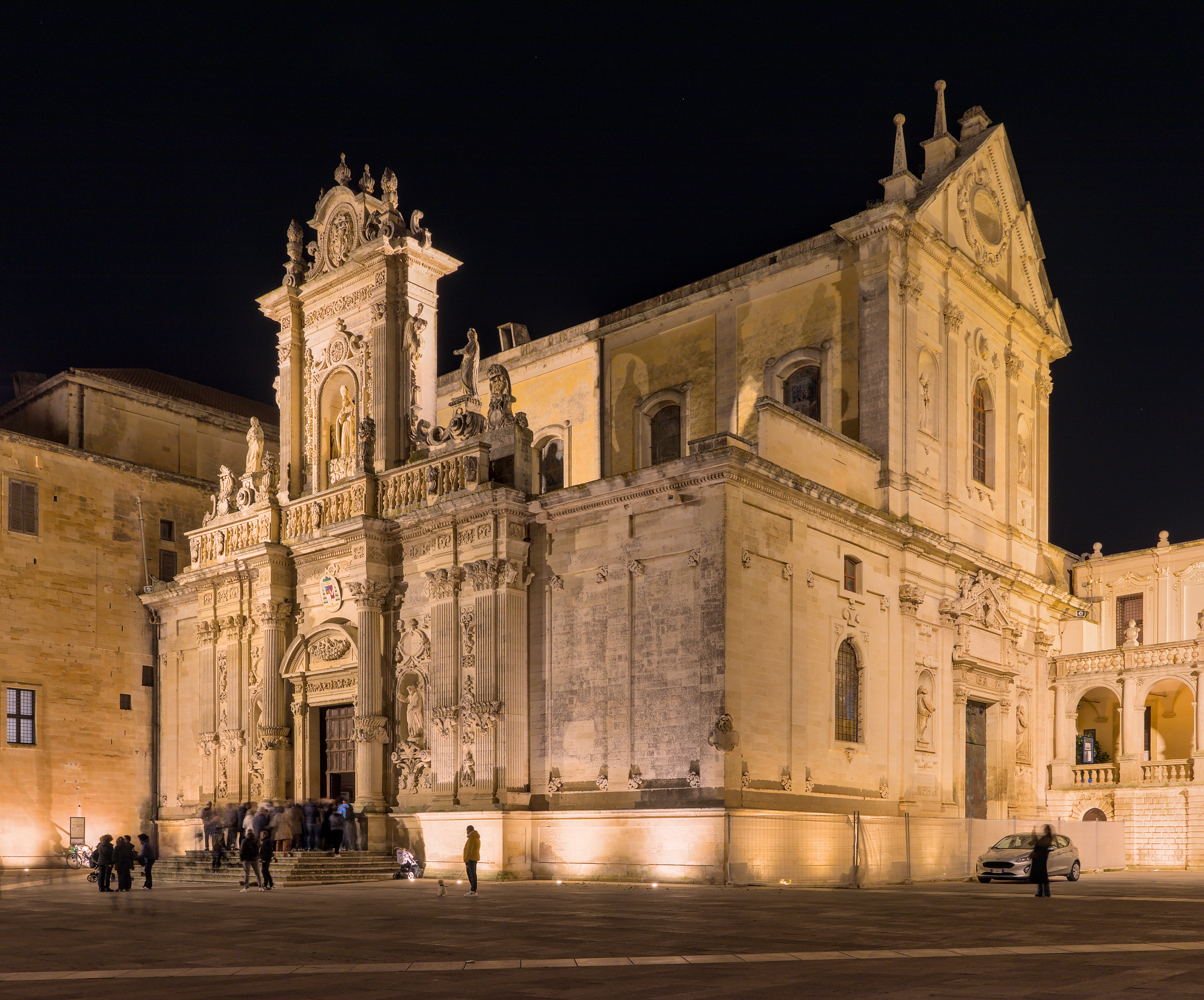
The cathedral at night

=== Interior ===
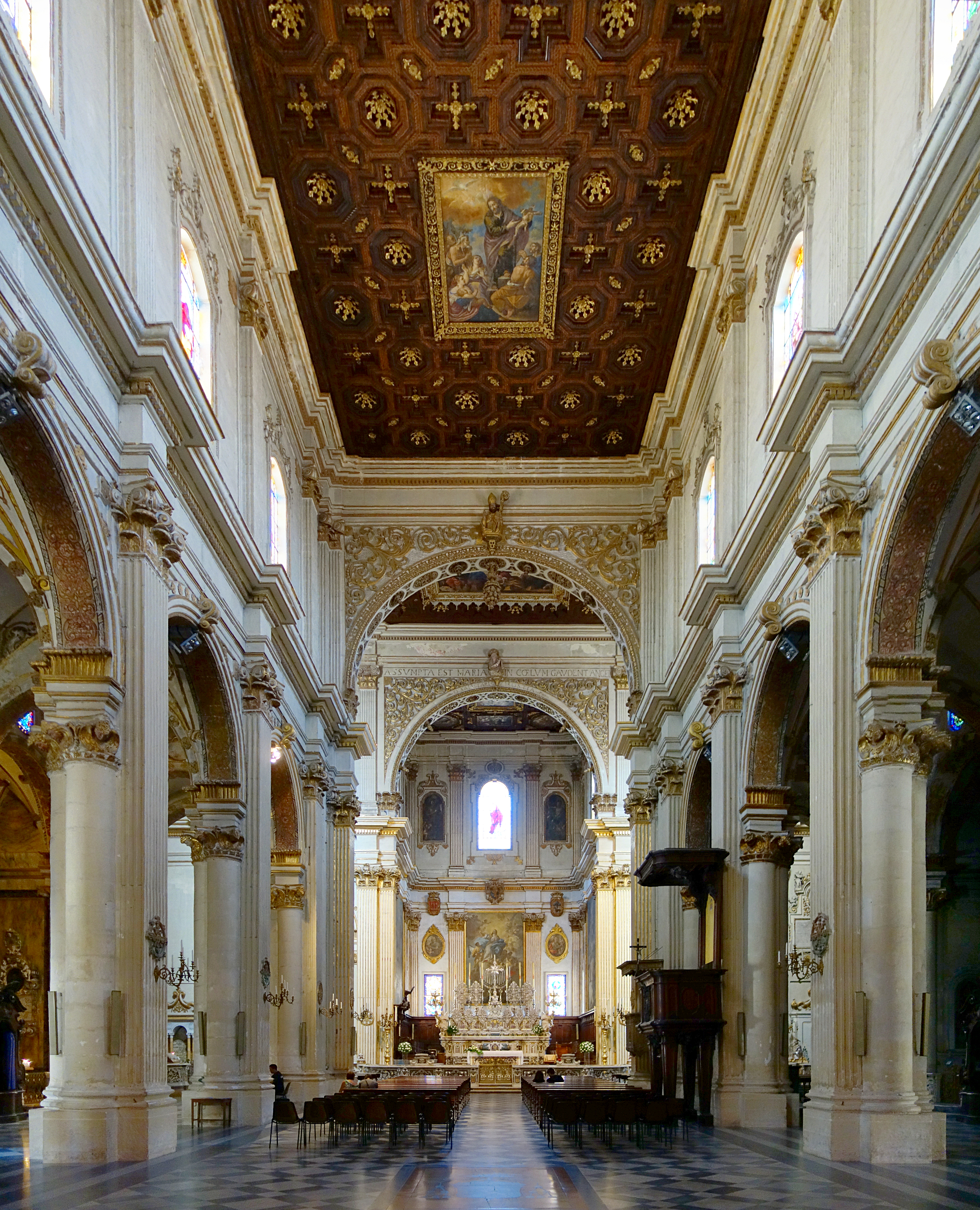
The central nave

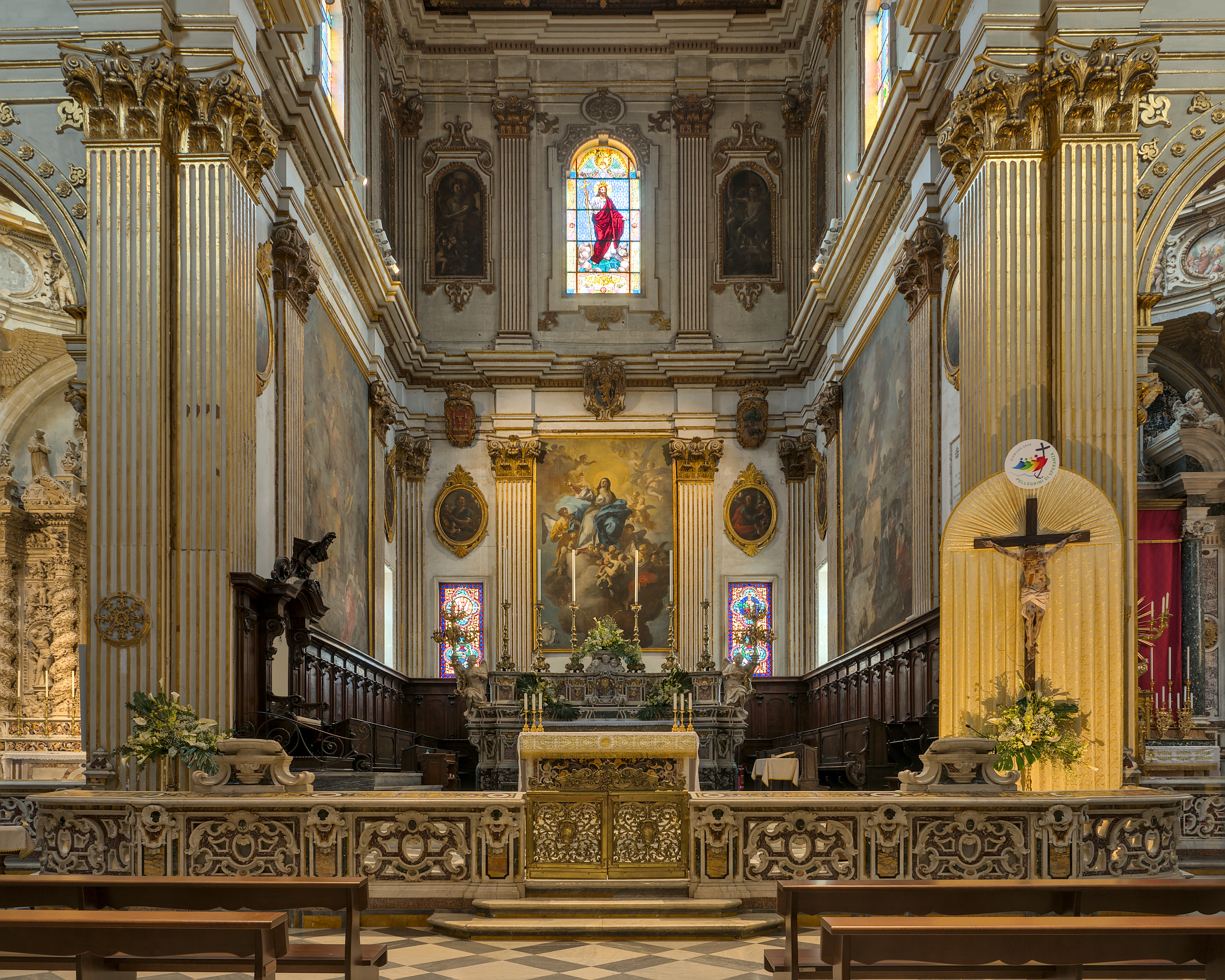
The choir

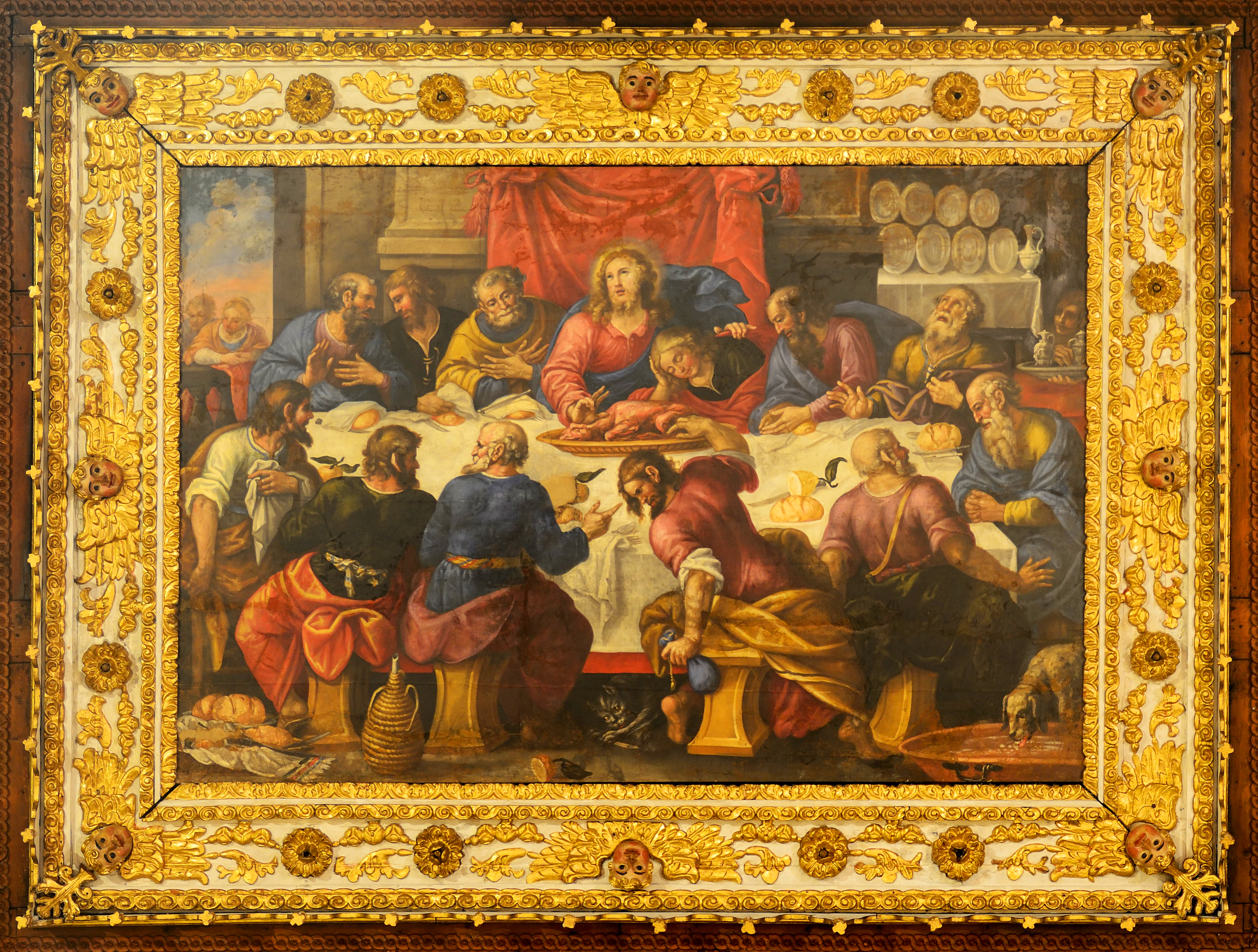
The Last Supper by Giuseppe da Brindisi, on the ceiling

The cathedral has a Latin cross plan with three naves divided by pilasters and columns, and the main altar is placed at the eastern end of the church. The central nave and the transepts are covered by a wooden ceiling with coffers created in 1685 along with paintings by Giuseppe da Brindisi which show: the Preaching of Saint Orontius, the Protection from the Plague, the Martyrdom of Saint Orontius, and the Last Supper.

The cathedral contains twelve side chapels, each with its own altar. The side chapels are dedicated to (starting on the left side of the nave):

- John the Baptist (1682)
- Nativity of Jesus which contains a 16th-century creche
- the martyrdom of Saint Giusto (1674)
- Saint Anthony of Padua (also from 1674)
- the Immaculate Conception (1689)
- Saint Philip Romolo Neri (1690)
- the Crucifixion of Jesus and the Blessed Sacrament (1780)
- Saint Orontius of Lecce (1671)
- Our Lady of Sorrows
- Saint Giusto (1656)
- Saint Charles Borromeo
- Saint Andrew the Apostle (1687)

The chapels house works by artists including Giuseppe da Brindisi, Oronzo Tiso, Gianserio Strafella, G. Domenico Catalano and G. A. Coppola.

The main altar is made of marble and gold-plated bronze, and was constructed by bishop Sersale. It was consecrated in 1757 by bishop Sozi Carafa, who also commissioned the large central painting, the Assumption of Mary by Oronzo Tiso (1757) as well as the two lateral images of the Sacrifice of the Prophet Elias and the Sacrifice of Noah after the Flood (1758). The choir stalls and bishop's chair, made of walnut, were designed by Emanuele Manieri and were commissioned by bishop Fabrizio Pignatelli in 1797.

The 12th century cathedral crypt underwent Baroque modifications in the 16th century. It has a longitudinal space that contains two Baroque chapels with paintings that is crossed by a long corridor consisting of ninety-two columns with capitals decorated with human figures.

=== Bell tower ===
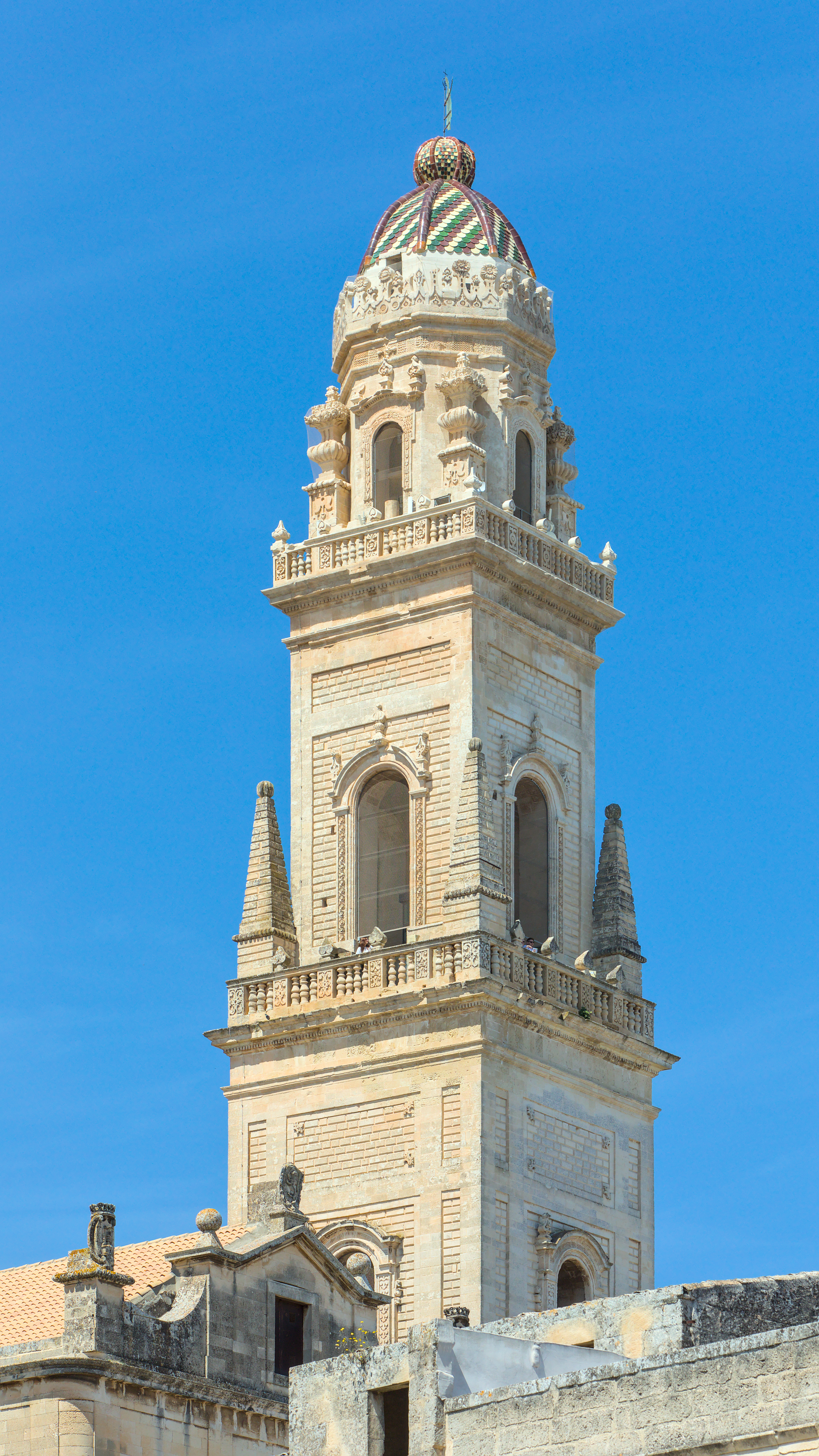
The cathedral's bell tower

The bell tower was constructed in 1661–1662 by Lecce architect Giuseppe Zimbalo at the request of bishop Luigi Pappacoda. It was built to replace the previous Norman bell tower, erected by Goffredo d'Altavilla, which crumbled at the beginning of the 17th century. It has a square shape and appears to be made up of five tapered levels, the last of which is surmounted by an octagonal majolica dome, on which there is an iron statue of Sant'Oronzo. The top four floors (now accessible via a panoramic lift) have a single window on each side, and each has a balustrade going completely around its perimeter. Engraved on plaques located over the mullioned windows are Latin inscriptions taken from the writings of Giovanni Lecce Camillo Palma. At a height of 72 meters, the bell tower offers views of the Adriatic Sea, and on clear days even the mountains of Albania are visible. It leans slightly due to a partly sunken foundation.

== Sources ==
- Lecce elegia del Barocco, Michele Paone, Congedo Editore, Galatina (Lecce) 1999
