= Francesco Antonio Zimbalo =

Italian architect

Francesco Antonio Zimbalo (Lecce, 1567 – Lecce, 1631) was an Italian architect.

He was a prominent architects during the Baroque period in the town of Lecce in southern Italy. He designed the three portals of the façade and the altar of San Francesco di Paola of the Basilica of Santa Croce. He was the grandfather of Giuseppe Zimbalo.
