= Basilica of Santa Croce, Lecce =

Basilica in Lecce, Italy

Coordinates: 40°21′16.83″N 18°10′22.65″E

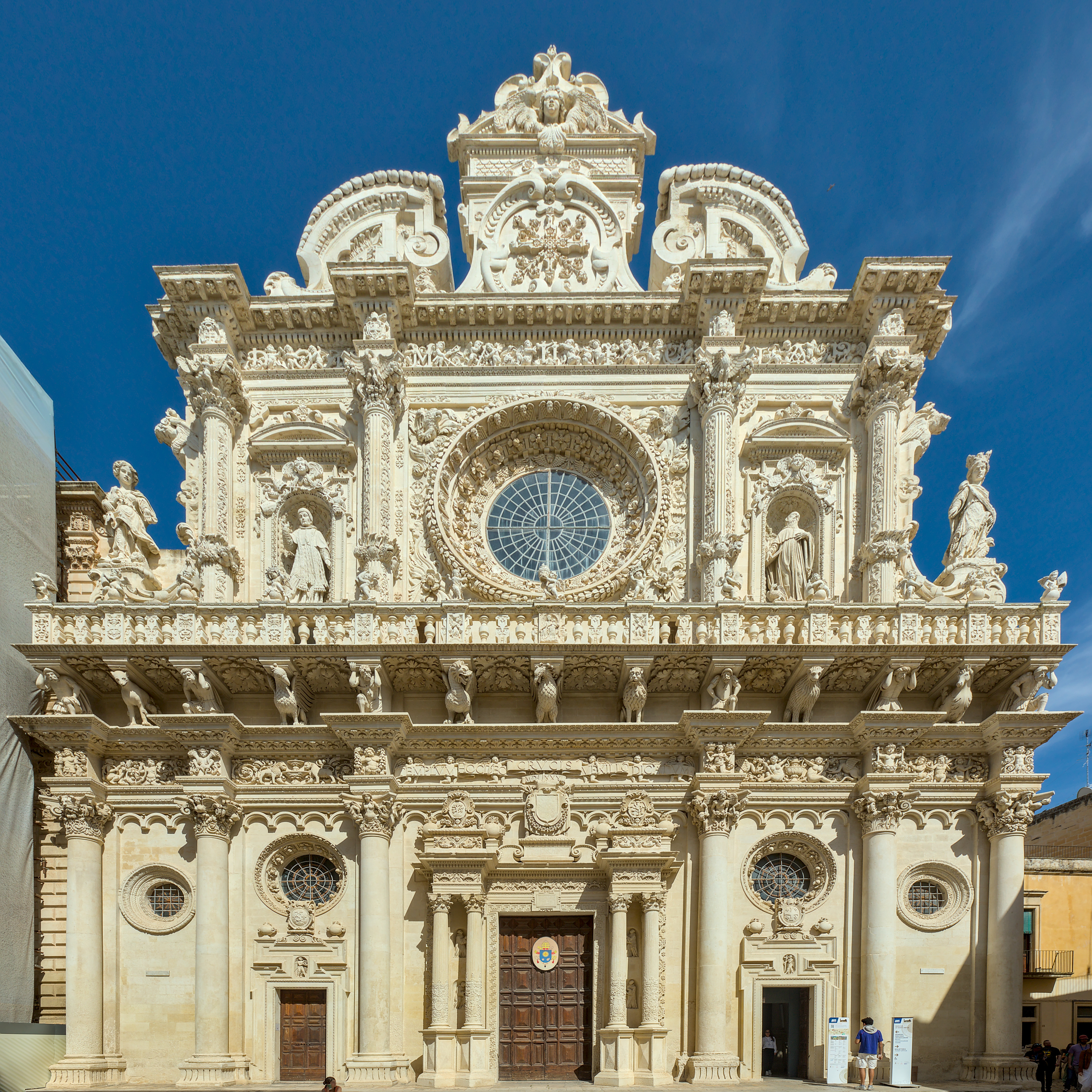
Façade of the Basilica di Santa Croce, Lecce

The Basilica of the Holy Cross (Italian: Basilica di Santa Croce) is a Baroque-style church completed in 1695 in Lecce, Apulia, Italy.

== History ==
Walter VI, Count of Brienne, had founded a monastery in the 14th century in the current church. In 1549, a new church was begun, using, among the others, houses from Jews who had been ousted from Lecce in 1510. The construction dragged on for two centuries; by 1582, the lower façade had been finished, while the dome was completed in 1590. The portals were added starting in 1606, under the direction of Francesco Antonio Zimbalo. The church was completed by his successors Cesare Penna (upper façade and the rose window) and Giuseppe Zimbalo (decoration of the upper façade).

== Exterior ==
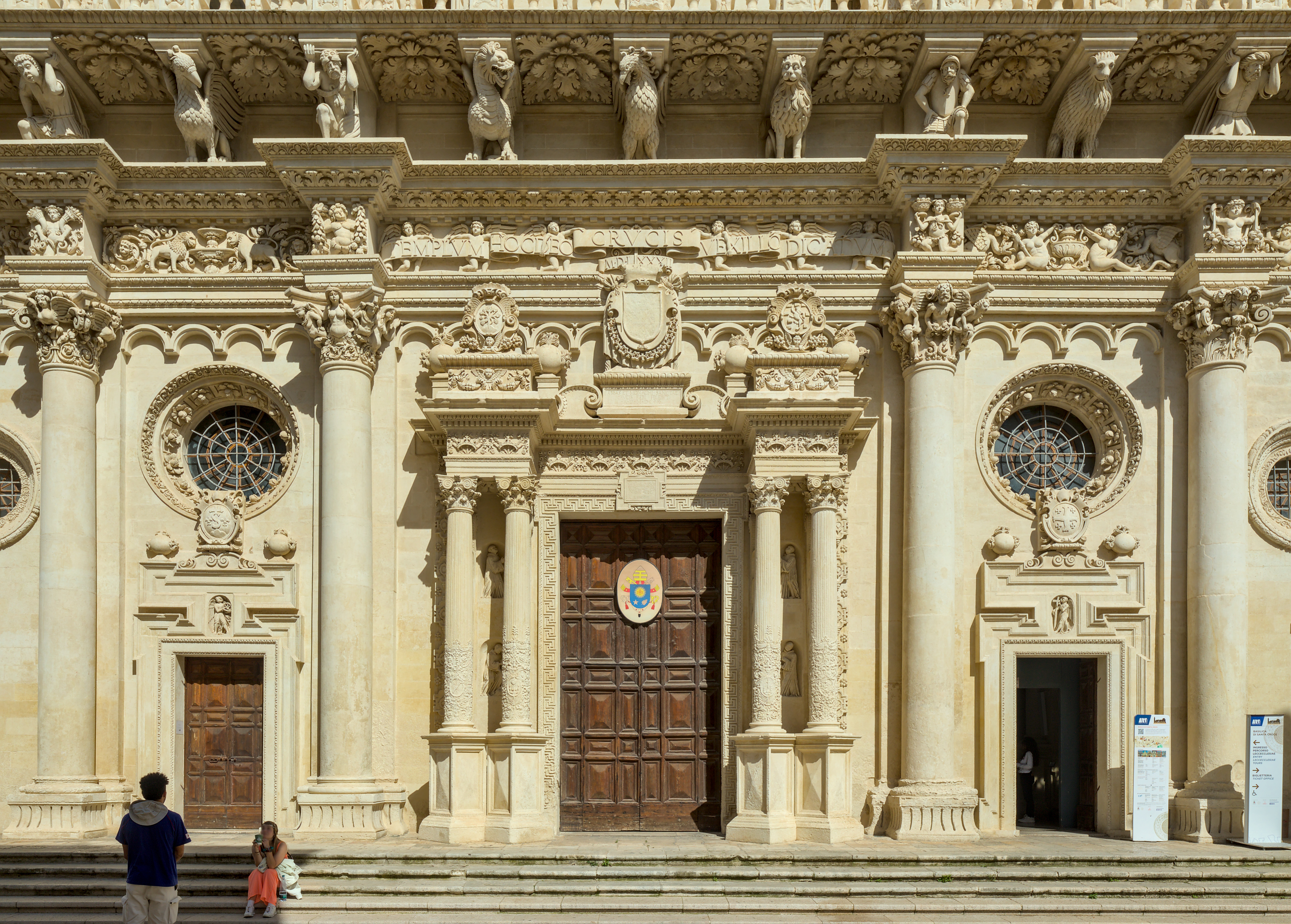
Lower part of the façade

The church has a richly decorated façade, with six smooth columns supporting an entablature, with animals, grotesque figures and vegetables, and has a large rose window. The main portal has a pair of Corinthian columns and the coats of arms of Philip III of Spain, Mary of Enghien and Walter VI of Brienne, while on the side portals are those of the Celestines. Several atlantes would represent the Turk prisoners made by the Christian League at the Battle of Lepanto. The animals under the balustrade would symbolize the Christian powers which participated in the battle: the dragon was the symbol of the Boncompagni, family of Pope Gregory XIII; the griffon the Republic of Genoa, Hercules the Grand Duke of Tuscany

Details of the façade

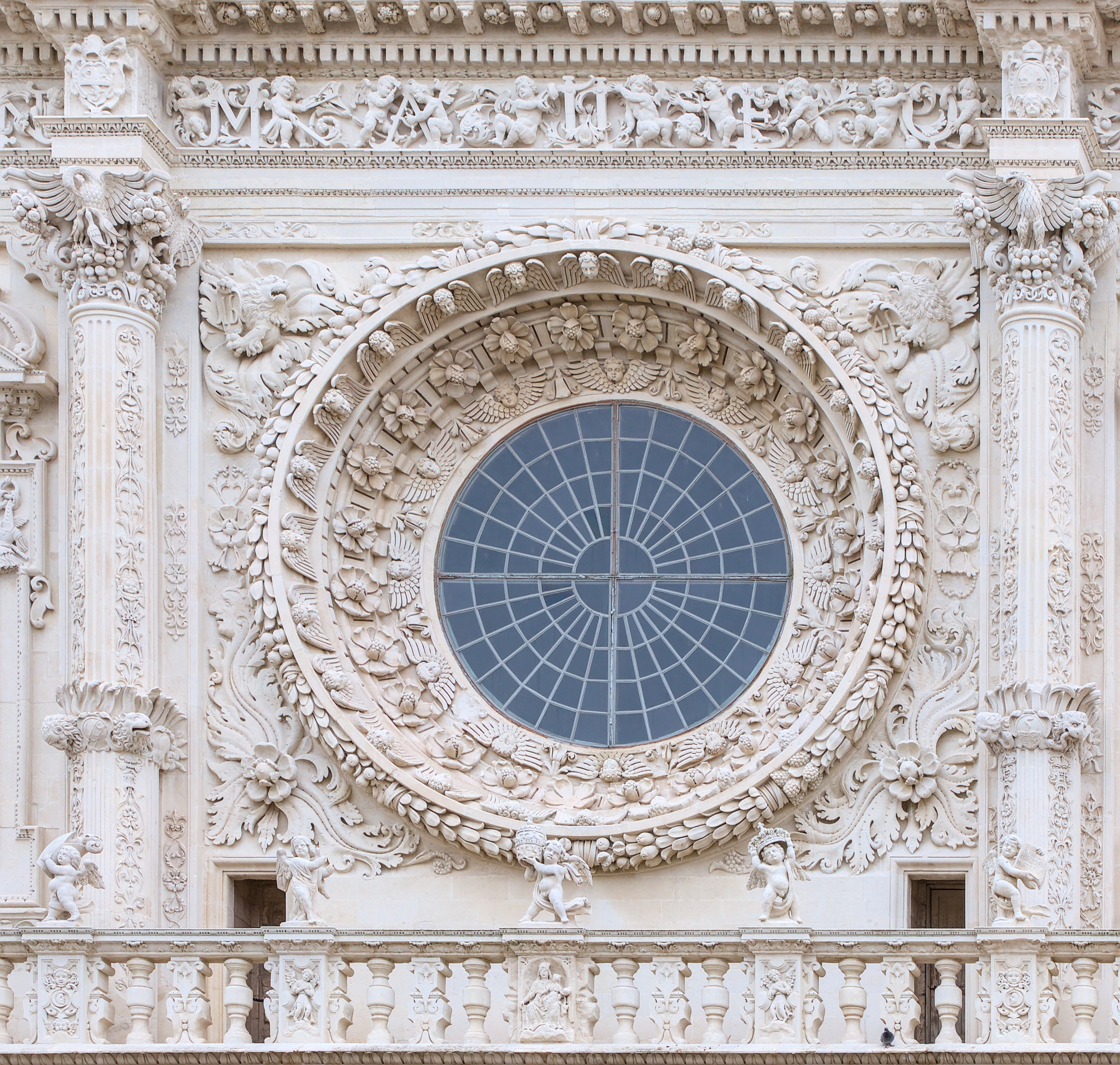

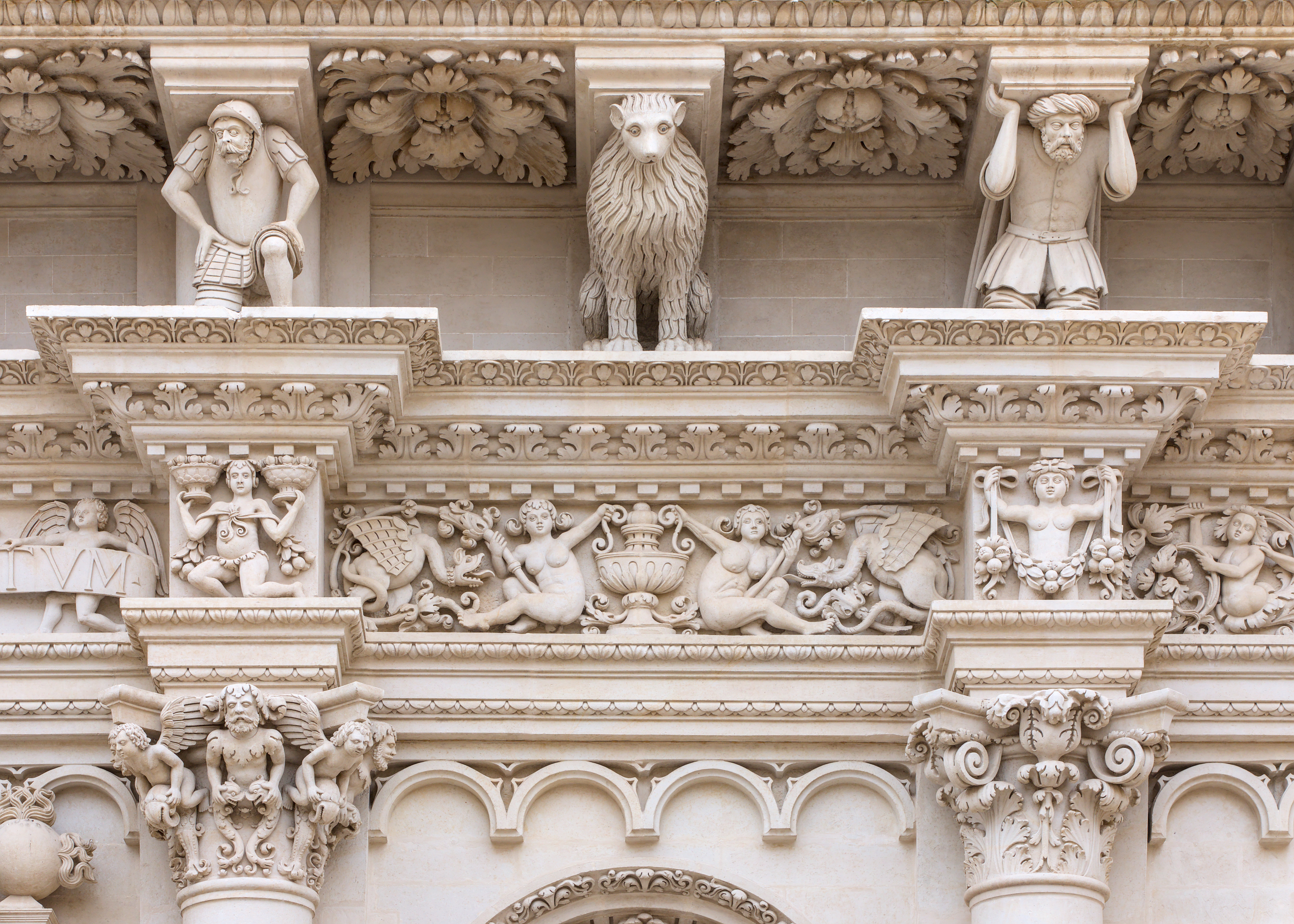

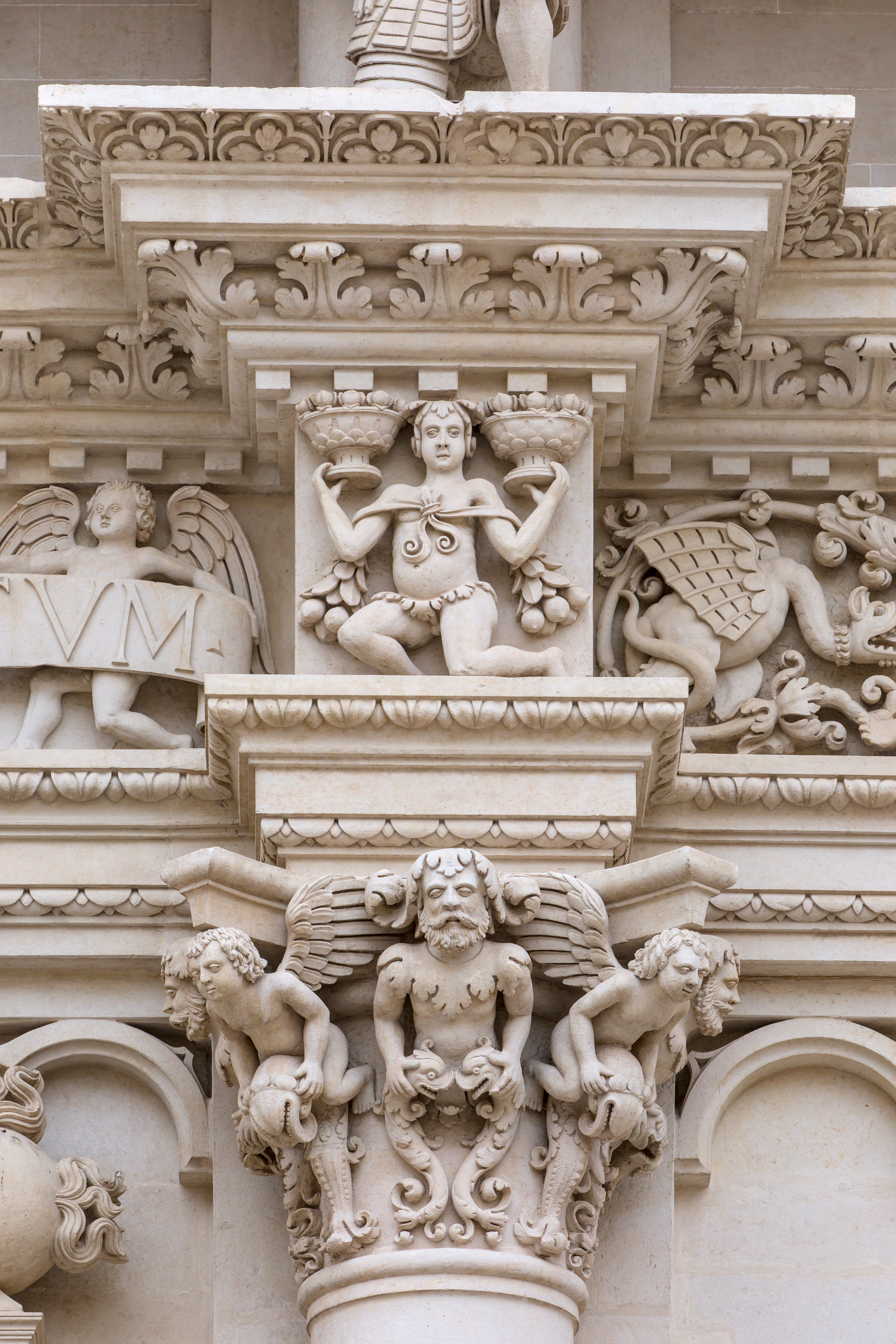

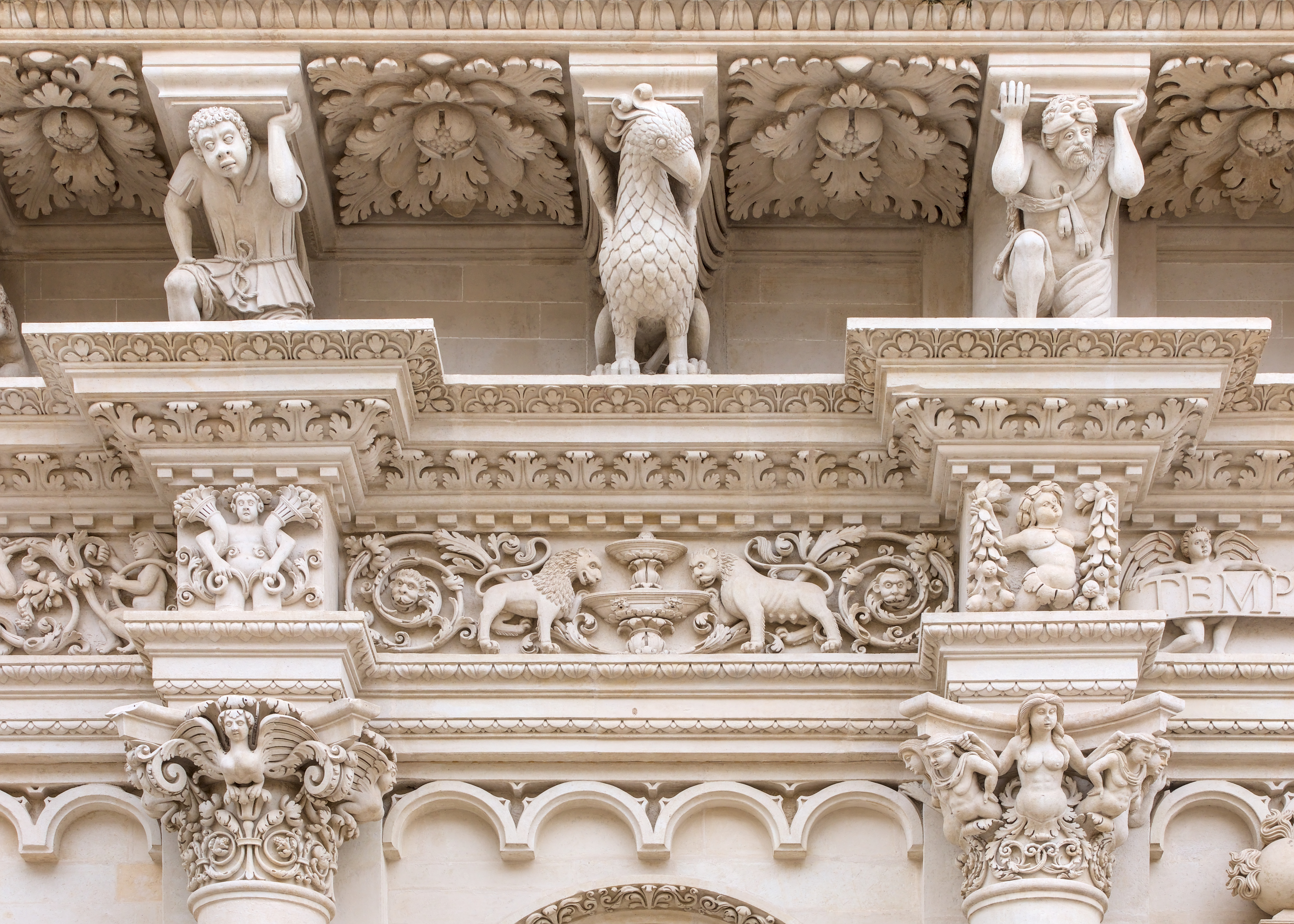
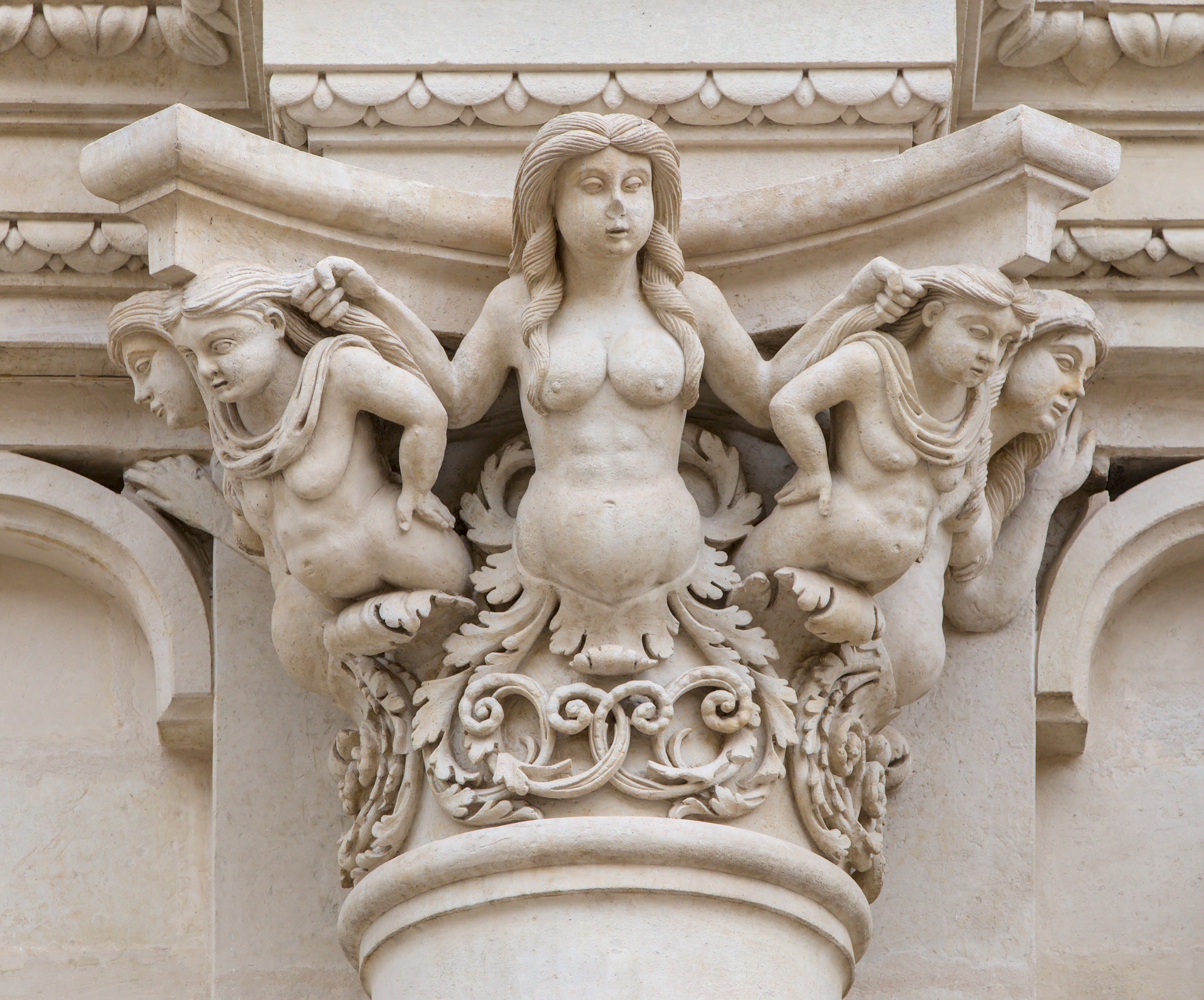

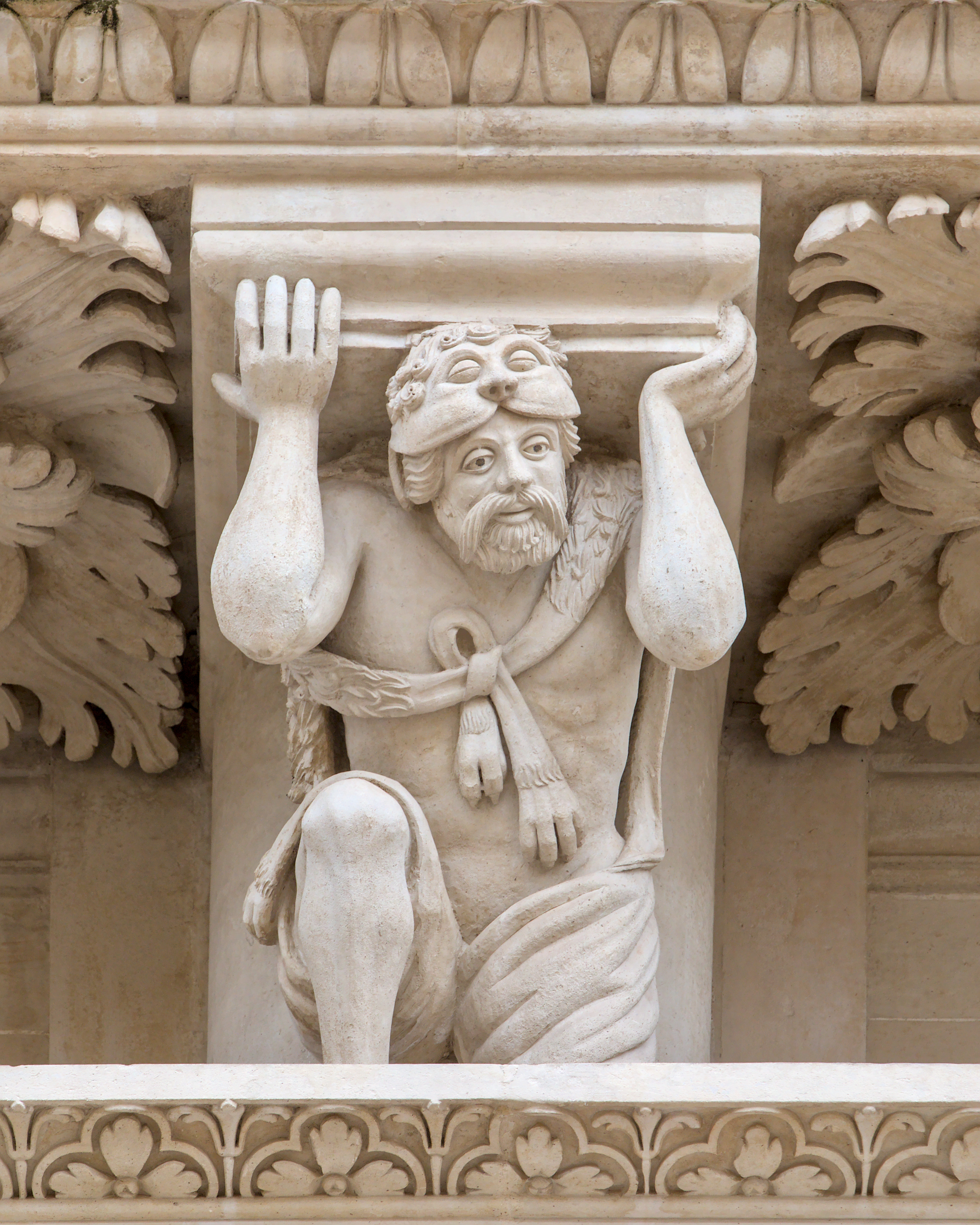

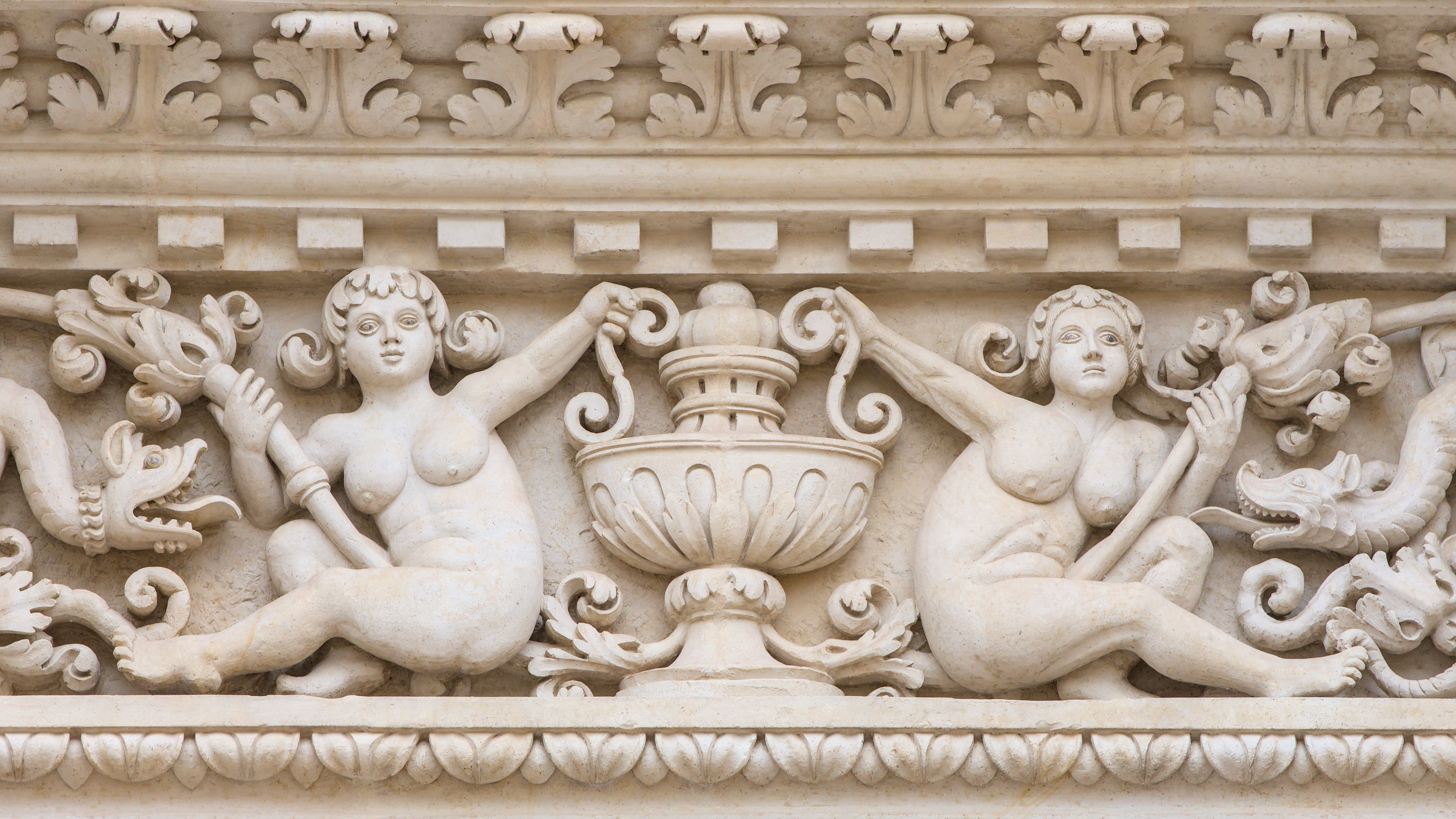

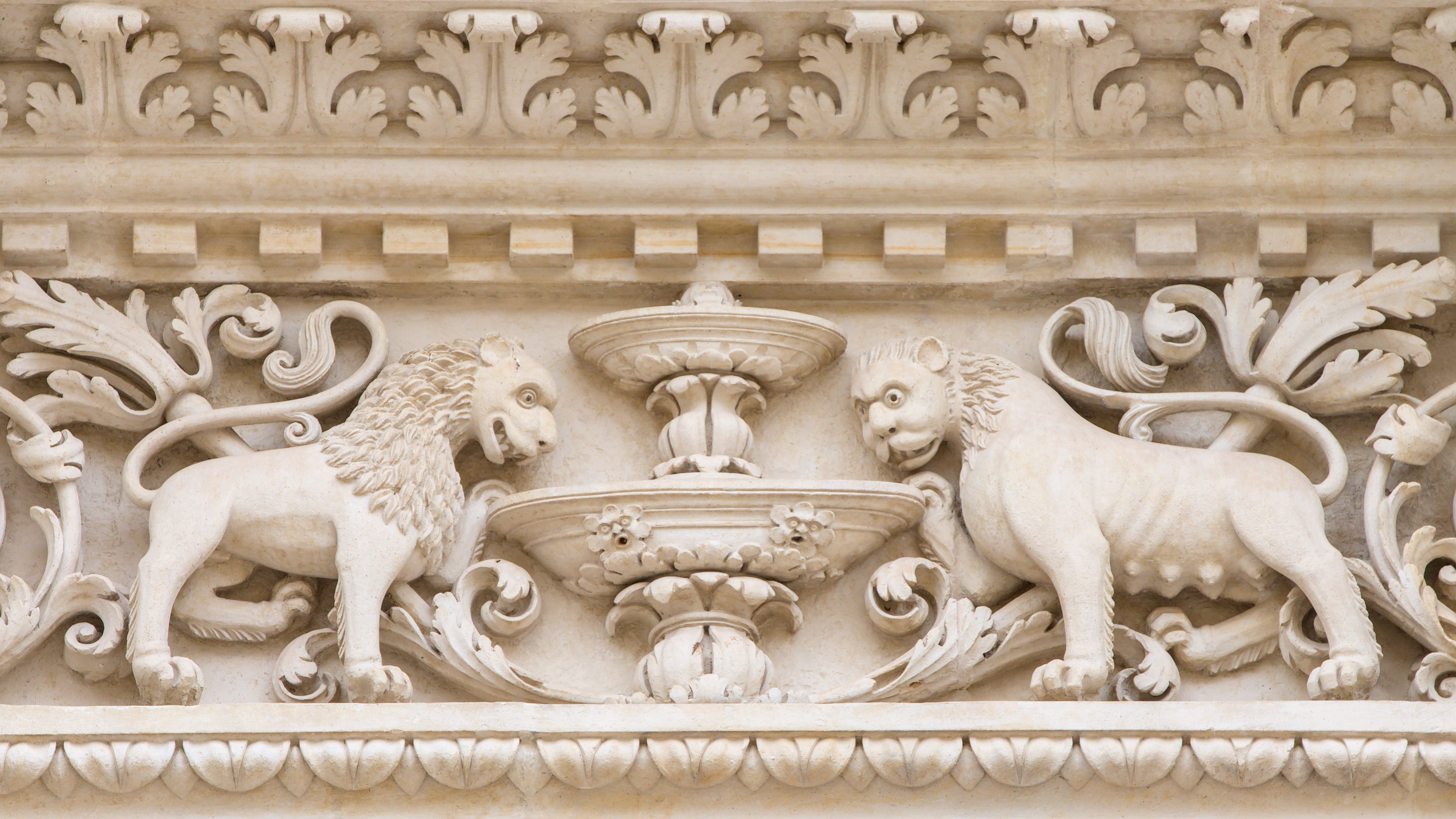

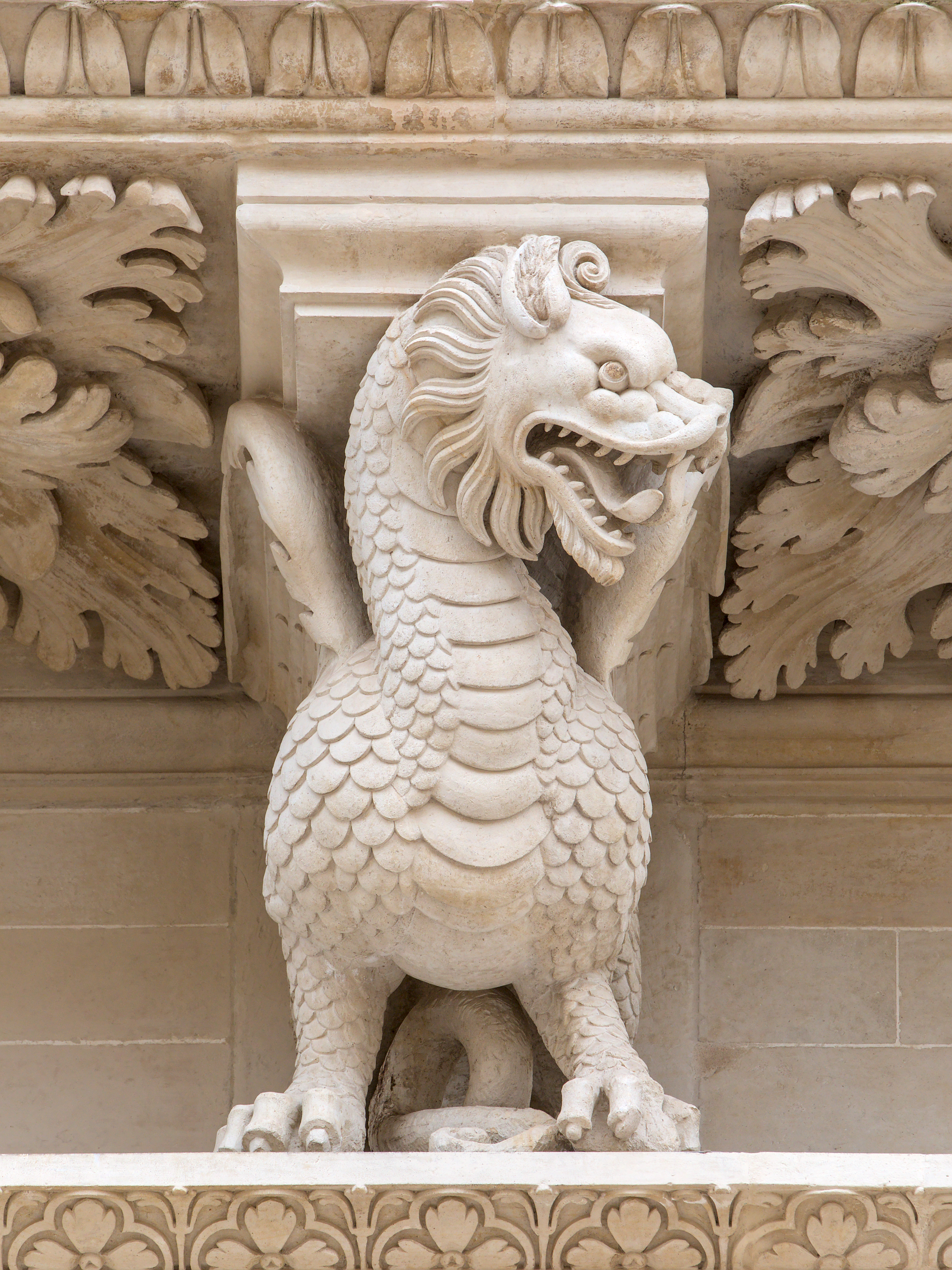

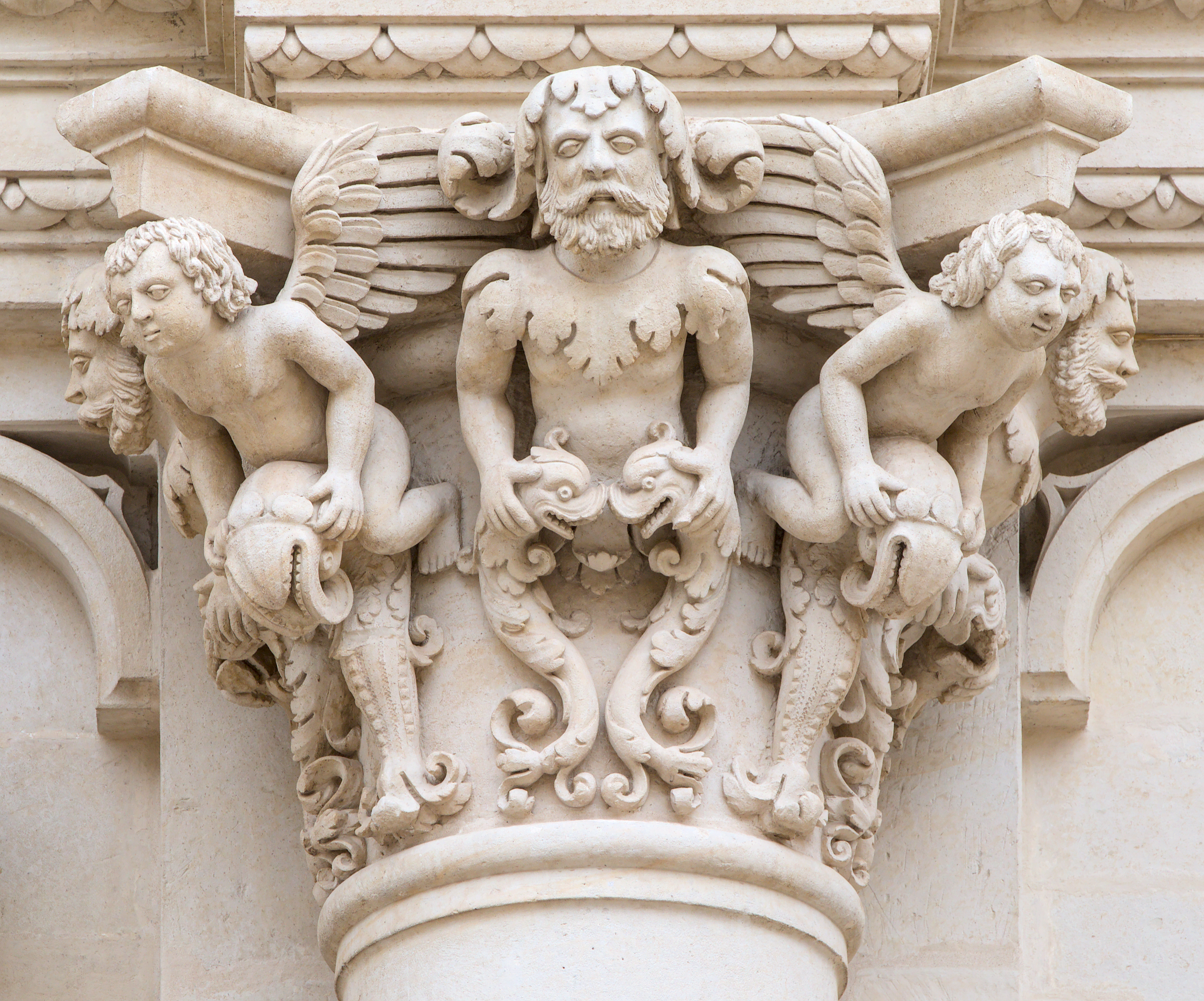

== Interior ==
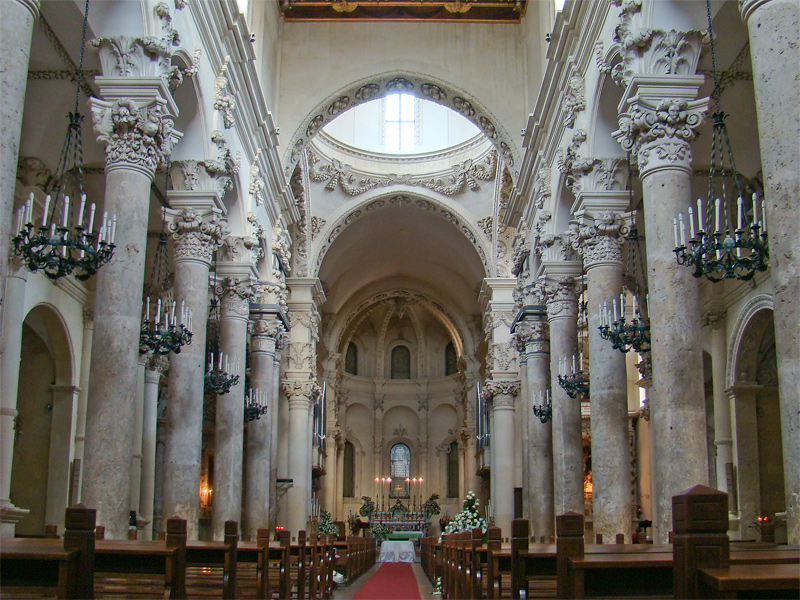
Interior

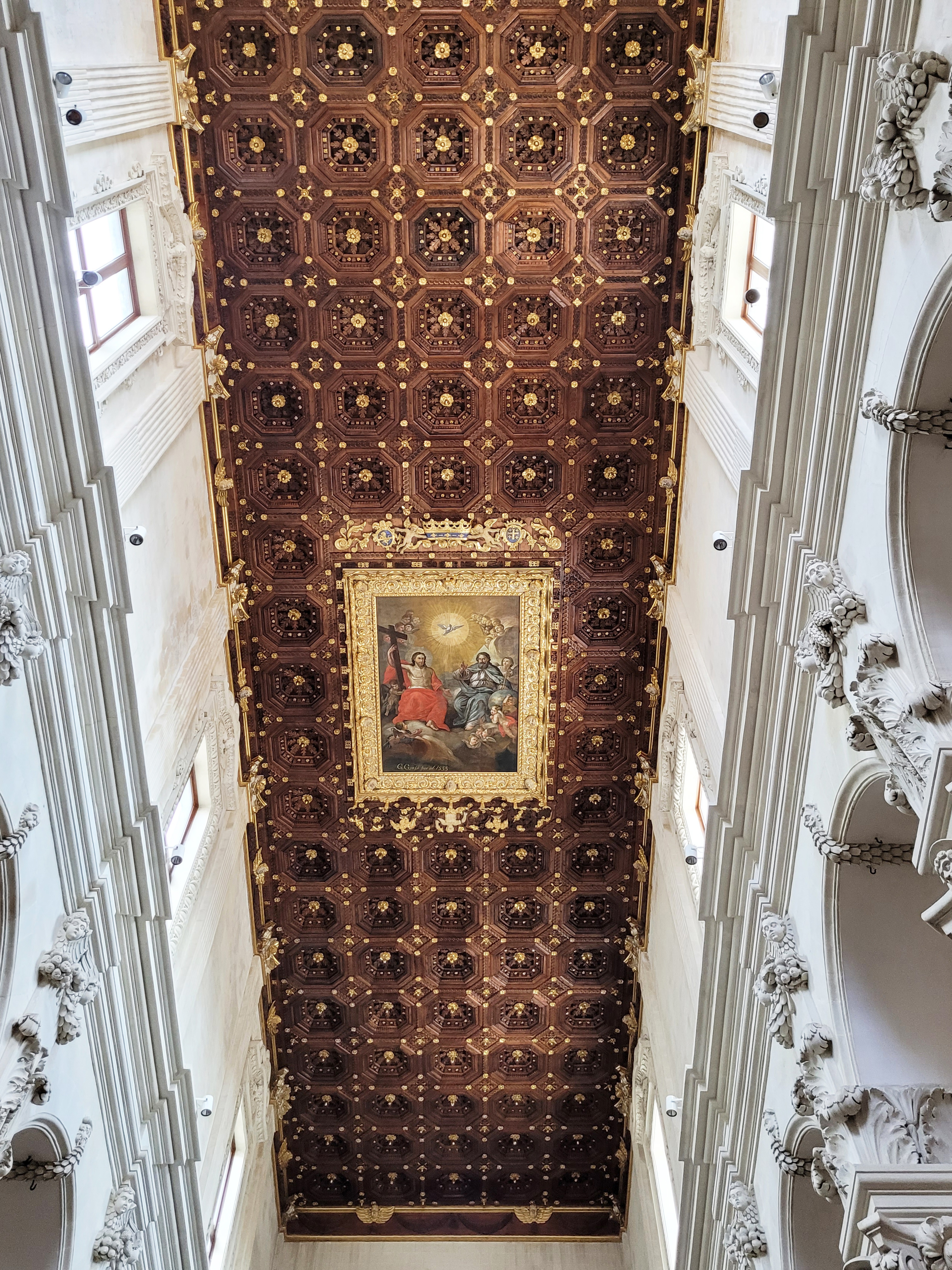
Ceiling

The interior, on the Latin cross plan, originally had a nave and four aisles, two of which were turned into side chapels in the 18th century. The church has seventeen altars: the main one has a decorated portal with the coat of arms of the Adorni family, whose tombs were inside the basilica. Notable is also that of St. Francis of Paola, a Baroque piece of art by Francesco Antonio Zimbalo.

The nave has a rich wooden caisson ceiling.
