= Diocesan Museum of Gallipoli =

Museum in Gallipoli, Italy

Coordinates: 40.054998°N 17.976965°E

Diocesan museum of Gallipoli
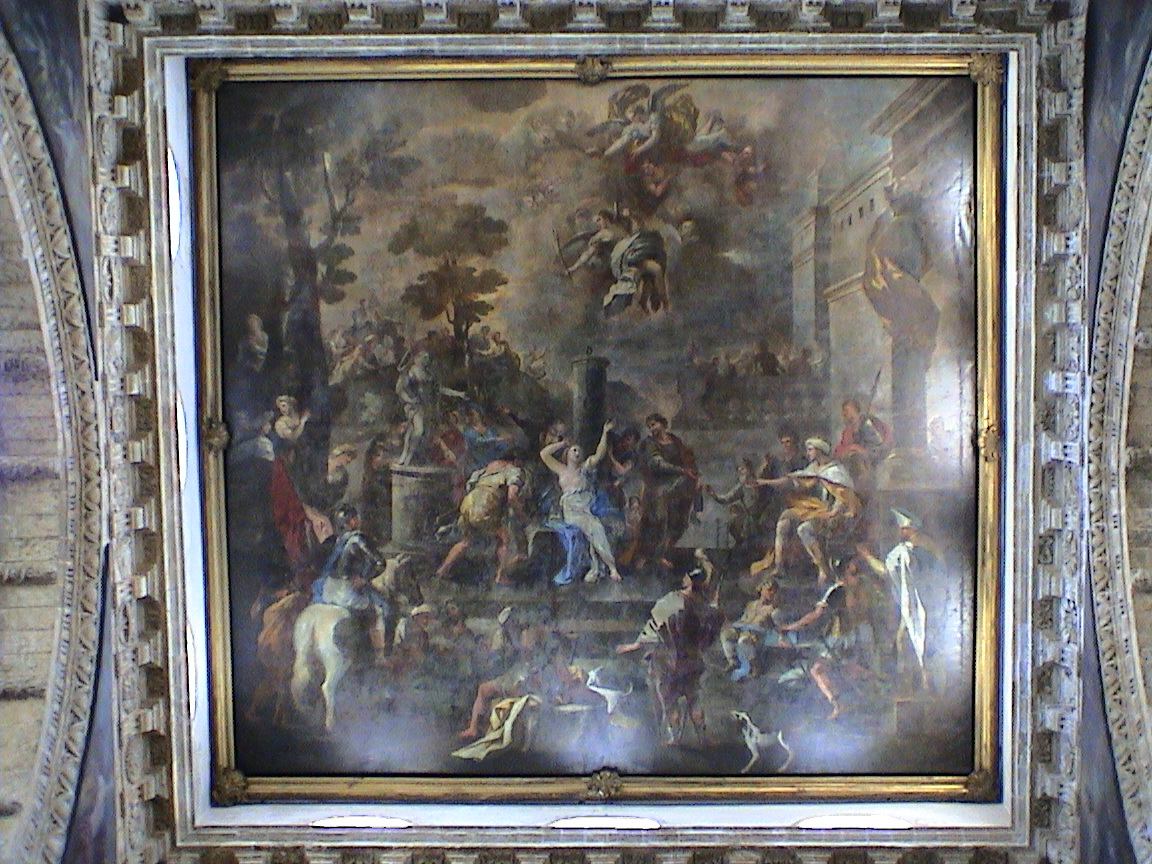
- Painting in the Basilica Cathedral of Gallipoli
- Established: July 12, 2004
- Location: Via Antonietta De Pace, 51, Gallipoli
- Type: Sacred art
- Founders: Aldo Garzia, CEI
- Director: Rev.do Mons. Giuliano Santantonio

The diocesan museum of Gallipoli is located in Gallipoli and is run by the Diocese of Nardò-Gallipoli.

== Overview ==
The diocesan museum of Gallipoli was officially inaugurated on July 12, 2004, through an initiative by the Italian Episcopal Conference (Conferenza Episcopale Italiana, CEI), the Diocese of Nardò-Gallipoli, and the community of the Cathedral Basilica of Saint Agatha of Gallipoli, with assistance from the European Union and the Italian region of Apulia. The idea to open a diocesan museum originated with then-bishop, Aldo Garzia, and was developed by his successors.

The architecture is found at the historic center of Gallipoli at the most important point of the old city. The museum occupies space inside the old palazzo of Gallipoli's seminary which is adjacent to the Cathedral Basilica whose construction began in 1750.

The structure has substantially preserved its original look and, with the numerous Baroque decorations, covers 900 square meters laid out on three floors. The museum contains 553 objects, including liturgical metal works, vestments, miters, pastoral and pectoral crosses, numerous portraits, bronze bells, ceramics decorated with coats of arms of all the bishops of the diocese, and works of Gian Domenico Catalano. All of these objects come from the cathedral, the curia, and the bishop's residence.

The old chapel on the second floor houses two gold and silver statues of Saint Agatha and Saint Sebastian, made in Napoli and originally owned by the comune. The statue of Saint Agatha (patron of the diocese and the city, as well as of the cathedral) "…was brought to Gallipoli on June 10, 1760 aboard xebecs at the expense and for the devotion of Msgr. Serafino Brancon and was given to Vicar General Fr. Carlo Zaccaria".

Also found here are a baldacchino of S.E.R. Msgr. Oronzo Filomarini, precious liturgical vestments, and a 16th-century copy of the Holy Shroud, one of only five in existence (donated by bishop Sebastiano Quintiero Ortiz and made in direct contact with the original in Torino). A silver reliquary, containing a piece of the True Cross, is decorated the coat of arms of bishop Alessio Zelodano.

== Archives ==
Next to the diocesan museum and inside the space of the cathedral are the curial archives of Gallipoli, made up of about 4310 archival units. These contain archives and historical works from the 16th century to the present. Unfortunately, no document before 1500 has survived, since everything prior was destroyed by the Venetians in the historic battle of 1484. The archives include manuscripts related to pastoral visits, diocesan synods, bishops, excommunications, criminal trials, marriages, curial legislation, parishes, confraternities and monasteries, ordinations, patrimonies, charity, and private oratories.
