= Sannicola =

Sannicola Rodògallo (Greek)
- Comune
- Comune di Sannicola
- Location within Italy Location within Apulia
- Coordinates: 40°6′N 18°4′E
- Country: Italy
- Region: Apulia
- Province: Lecce (LE)
- Frazioni: Chiesanuova, Lido Conchiglie, San Simone

Area
  - Total: 27 km^{2} (10 sq mi)
- Elevation: 75 m (246 ft)

Population (30 November 2008)
  - Total: 5,924
  - Density: 220/km^{2} (570/sq mi)
- Demonym: Sannicolesi
- Time zone: UTC+1 (CET)
  - Summer (DST): UTC+2 (CEST)
- Postal code: 73017
- Dialing code: 0833
- ISTAT code: 075070
- Patron saint: Madonna delle Grazie
- Saint day: 8 September
- Website: Official website

Sannicola is a town and comune in the Italian province of Lecce in the Apulia region of south-east Italy.

== History ==
Sannicola the town contains an old Roman defensive tower to protect it against Saracene, Norman and Venetian invaders.
