= Giuseppe Zimbalo =

Italian sculptor

Giuseppe Zimbalo (1620–1710) was an Italian architect and sculptor.

Known as Lo Zingarello ("Tiny Gypsy"), he was one of the most prominent artists in the so-called Baroque of Lecce, his hometown in southern Italy. Here he designed part of the façade of the Basilica of Santa Croce and the Celestine palace, finished the Duomo (1651–1682; he designed in particular the tall bell tower) and sculpted the column of Sant'Oronzo (1666).

Zimbalo was the grandson of Francesco Antonio Zimbalo. One of his sons, Francesco, was also an architect and sculptor.
