= Feast of Saint Agatha =

Liturgical commemoration of an early Catholic woman martyr

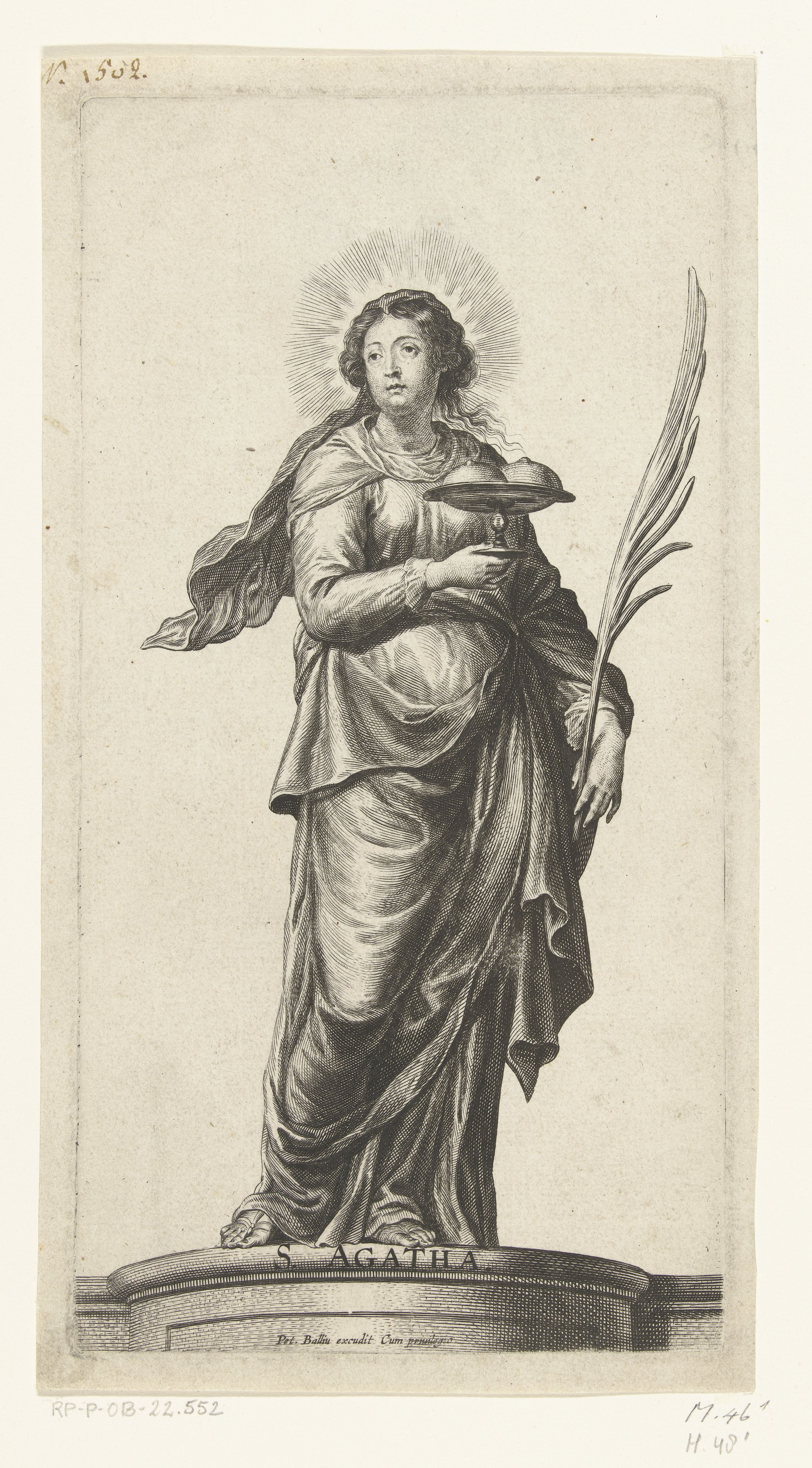
- A depiction of Saint Agatha with the palm of martyrdom
- Observed by: Anglicanism, Catholicism, Eastern Orthodoxy, Lutheranism, Methodism, Reformed
- Liturgical color: Red
- Type: Christian
- Significance: Feast day of Saint Agatha
- Observances: Attending Mass or other service of worship
- Date: February 5 in the Roman Rite; February 18 in the Byzantine Rite
- Frequency: annual

The Feast of Saint Agatha is an annual liturgical commemoration of Saint Agatha of Sicily (c. 231 – c. 251 AD), a Christian virgin martyr, celebrated on February 5 in the Roman Catholic Church and other Christian traditions. Rooted in the Roman Rite, the feast features a Mass and Divine Office enriched with Gregorian chant, honoring Agatha's martyrdom under the Decian persecution and her enduring legacy as a protector against fire, earthquakes, and bodily afflictions. One of the seven women named in the Canon of the Mass, her feast has evolved from early Christian veneration into a major cultural and religious event, particularly in Catania, Sicily, where it ranks among the world's largest religious festivals.

== Historical background ==
Saint Agatha, born in Catania or Palermo, Sicily, suffered martyrdom around 251 AD during Emperor Decius’ persecution of Christians (250–253). According to her Passio (5th–6th century), she rejected the advances of Roman prefect Quintianus, who tortured her by excising her breasts before her execution. Miraculously healed by Saint Peter in a vision, she died in prison, cementing her status as a symbol of purity and resilience. Her cult emerged soon after, with evidence of veneration in the Martyrologium Hieronymianum (c. 450) and the Carthaginian Synaxarion (c. 530). By the 6th century, Pope Symmachus (r. 498–514) dedicated a basilica to her in Rome, reflecting her widespread fame.

Agatha's intercessory power grew through reported miracles, notably halting Mount Etna's eruptions (e.g., in 252 AD, a year after her death, when her veil was said to stop lava). This protective role fueled her popularity across the Mediterranean, from Sicily to Constantinople, where Byzantine Empress Zoe (11th century) sought her relics. Her inclusion in the Roman Canon alongside saints like Lucy and Cecilia underscores her prominence in early Christianity.

The feast's liturgical shape took form as Gregorian chant developed under Pope Gregory I (r. 590–604) and Carolingian reforms (8th–9th centuries), integrating her story into the Roman Rite's sanctoral cycle.

Her cult spread widely by the 6th century, evidenced by her inclusion in the Martyrologium Hieronymianum and the Carthaginian Synaxarion (c. 530). The development of Gregorian chant, traditionally attributed to Pope Gregory I (r. 590–604), standardized the music of the Roman Rite, including Masses for saints like Agatha. Already a small Catholic chapel in her honour existed in Rome; but a larger church was held there by the still numerous Arian Goths, under the same patronage. Now, it was Gregory who annexed to the papal patrimony Saint Agatha of the Goths, made the solemn dedication (around 591–592), and inserted the name of the martyr in the Roman canon. On the other hand, the very particular warmth of the liturgical chants in honour of Saint Agatha struck the musicians, and the introit was supposed, with great probability, to be the Latin adaptation of a Greek troparion, borrowed perhaps from a liturgy of Sicily.

By the late 8th and 9th centuries, under Carolingian influence, her feast day liturgy was formalized with chants preserved in medieval manuscripts like the Graduale Romanum. Sicily's Norman rulers (11th–12th centuries) further amplified her cult, blending Latin and local traditions.

The 1570 Missale Romanum standardized her Mass, preserved until 1969. Vatican II simplified the liturgy, but Catania resisted, retaining elaborate traditions for Saint Agatha.

== Liturgical Office ==
The Feast of Saint Agatha comprises the Mass and Divine Office (Liturgy of the Hours), traditionally celebrated with Gregorian chant in the Roman Rite). It has been suggested that this ordinary may have been an adaptation to the papal ritual of the Arian liturgy of Saint Agatha of the Goths.

=== Mass of Saint Agatha ===
The Mass Proper for February 5 includes:

- Introit: Gaudeamus omnes (Mode I, Dorian) – "Let us all rejoice in the Lord, celebrating a feast day in honor of the blessed Agatha..." Its bright tritone (F–B♮, often flattened to B♭) evokes triumph. Gradually its melody become a popular and its use was extended to other celebrations, and in the 11th century the identical introit with only the saint's name changing was part of the liturgy of at least seven other different memorials of saints and feasts of Mary. (St. Benedict on July 11 ; Assumption of the Virgin Mary on August 15 (optional alternative); Solemnity and feasts of the Blessed Virgin Mary (ad libitum); and All Saints November 1). Gaudeamus influenced an even large group of introits in the first mode with a characteristic incipit: a leap of a fifth from the final D to the dominant A to then settle on B flat and again on A. This figure is found for example in the introits Rorate, Factus est Dominus, Inclina Domine, Statuit ei Dominus, Suscepimus Deus, Justus est; in the offertories Jubilate, Confitebor; in the communio Amen dico vobis; in the antiphon Ave Maria.
- Gradual: Adjuvabit (Mode V, Lydian) – "Grace is poured abroad in thy lips..." (Psalm 44:3), a reflective chant on her sanctity. The gradual response is, with some Roman formulas, quite extraordinary in the range of the melodic movements and the use of absolutely special formulas which evoke the liturgical origin in Constantinople of this ordinary received from the Arian Goths.
- Tract: Qui seminant in lacrimis (Mode VIII, Hypomixolydian) – "Who sows in tears..." is the first feast of the liturgical year in which the tract replaces the Alleluia, as the liturgy goes from Septuagesima to Lent.
- Offertory: Afferentur regi (Mode I, Dorian) – "The daughters of kings..." (Psalm 44:15) honors her witness and is borrowed from the feast of Saint Agnes.
- Communion: Qui me dignatus est (Mode VI, Hypolydian) – "He who deigned to heal me..." recalls her healing miracle.

The Ordinary (e.g., Kyrie, Gloria) varies by custom, often from simpler Kyriale settings like Missa XI (Orbis Factor).

=== Divine Office of Saint Agatha ===
The Office, sung in monasteries and cathedrals, features:

- Antiphons
- Hymns: Jesu corona virginum ("Jesus, crown of virgins"), adapted for Agatha, sung in Mode VIII, celebrates her virginity.
- Responsories: "Ego sum ancilla Christi" ("I am the handmaid of Christ"), in Mode IV (Hypophrygian), echoes her defiance of Quintianus.
- Readings: Excerpts from her legend, paired with Psalm 45 ("God is our refuge"), emphasize divine protection.

These chants, preserved in manuscripts like the Antiphonale Missarum and Graduale Romanum (11th century), reflect Carolingian standardization, using just intonation for a pure, modal sound.

== Celebration ==
=== Sant'Agata de' Goti, Rome ===
The patronal feast is still celebrated annually in the church of Sant'Agata de' Goti in Rome under the presidency of its titular cardinal Raymond L. Burke.

=== Catania, Sicily ===
In Catania, Agatha's hometown, the feast spans February 3–5, attracting over a million participants annually, rivaling Venice's Carnevale in scale. It was described in detail by Bayard Taylor after his trip to Sicily in the 1850s. Key rituals include:

- Procession: A silver reliquary bust of Agatha, containing her relics, is paraded on a 40,000-pound fercolo (float), pulled by devotees in white sacco robes. The route covers Via Etnea and sites tied to her martyrdom (e.g., the Cathedral of Saint Agatha, built 1070–1093).
- Candles: Massive candelore (candle towers), weighing up to 2,000 pounds, are carried by guilds, symbolizing her light against darkness.
- Fireworks and Music: Nightly displays honor her protection from Etna, with folk songs supplementing the Mass's chants.
- Relics: Her veil, arms, and breast relics are venerated, linking the liturgy to tangible history.

The Mass, once fully Gregorian, now blends chant with Sicilian hymns like O Virginedda bedda in the Novus Ordo, though traditionalists maintain the Tridentine form.

=== San Marino ===
The commemoration of Saint Agatha is also a bank holiday in the Repbublic of San Marino where she is honored as co-patroness of the Republic after the country was liberated from foreign rule on her feast day in 1740.

=== Global observance ===
Beyond Sicily, the feast is quieter. Since Vatican II, the feast of Saint Agatha has become an optional memorial, often in vernacular. Agatha appears in some other Christian calendars (e.g., February 18 in Byzantine Rite), with adapted offices but no unified chant tradition. In Malta and Spain, her protection against fire inspires smaller feasts, while her patronage of breast cancer patients resonates globally.

== See also ==
- Saint Agatha of Sicily
- Gregorian chant
- Festival of Saint Agatha (Catania)

== Sources ==
- Hiley, David (1993). Western Plainchant: A Handbook. Oxford University Press.
- Kirsch, Johann Peter (1912). "St. Agatha." Catholic Encyclopedia. New York: Robert Appleton Company.
- Graduale Romanum (1974). Solesmes: Abbaye Saint-Pierre.
- Russo, Gaetano (2001). La Festa di Sant’Agata a Catania. Catania: Edizioni Greco.
