= Festival of Saint Agatha (Catania) =

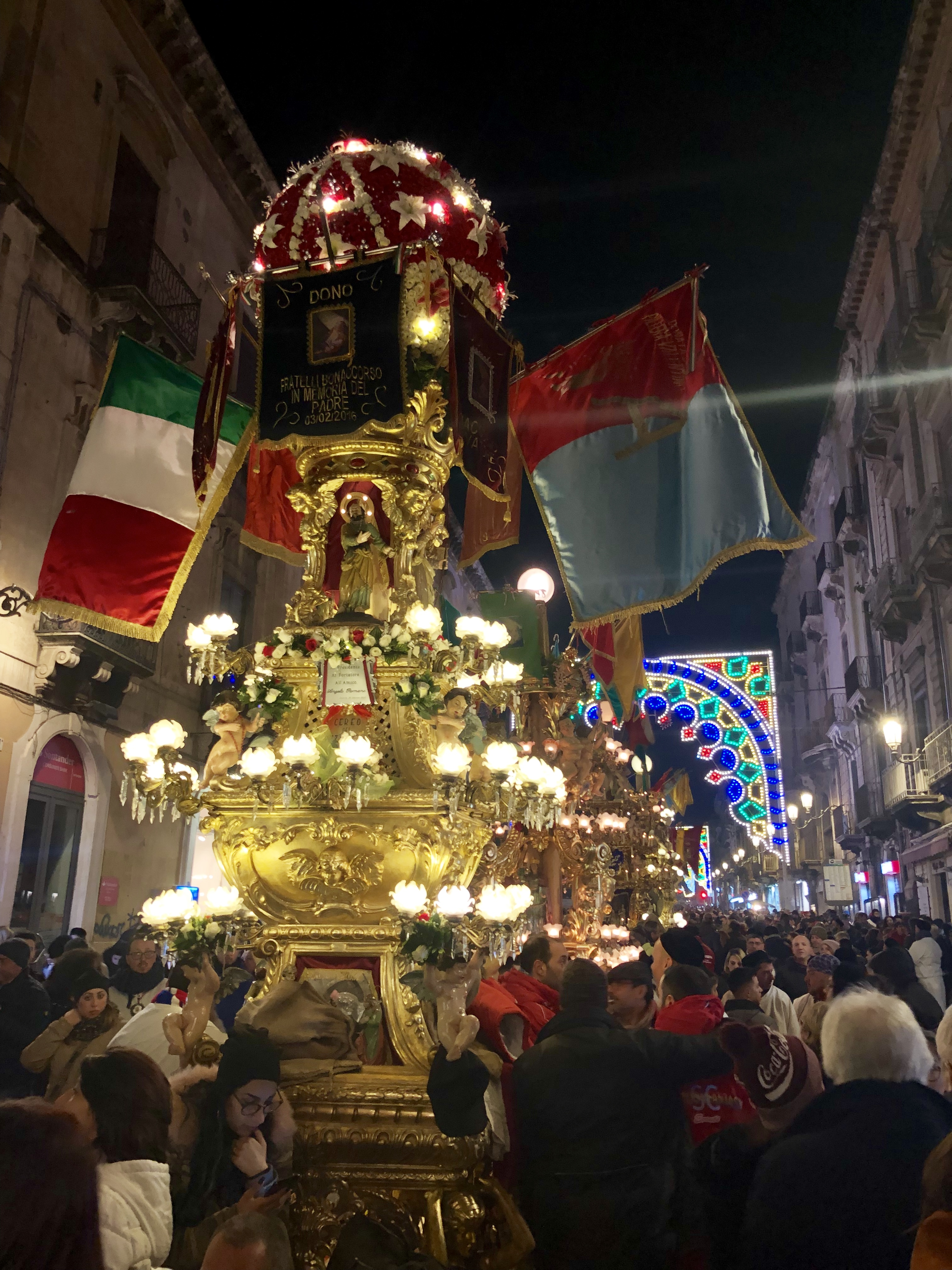
Festa di Sant'Agata, candalora

The Festival of Saint Agatha (Italian: La festa di sant'Agata; Sicilian: A fest' 'i sant'Àjita) is the most important religious festival of Catania, Sicily, commemorating the life of the city's patron saint, Agatha of Sicily. It is among the largest Catholic religious festivals in the world, in terms of participants and spectators. It takes place annually from 3 to 5 February, and on 17 August. The earlier dates commemorate the martyrdom of the Catanian saint, while the latter date celebrates the return of her remains from Constantinople, where they had been taken as spoils of war by the Byzantine general George Maniaces and held for 86 years.

== Background ==
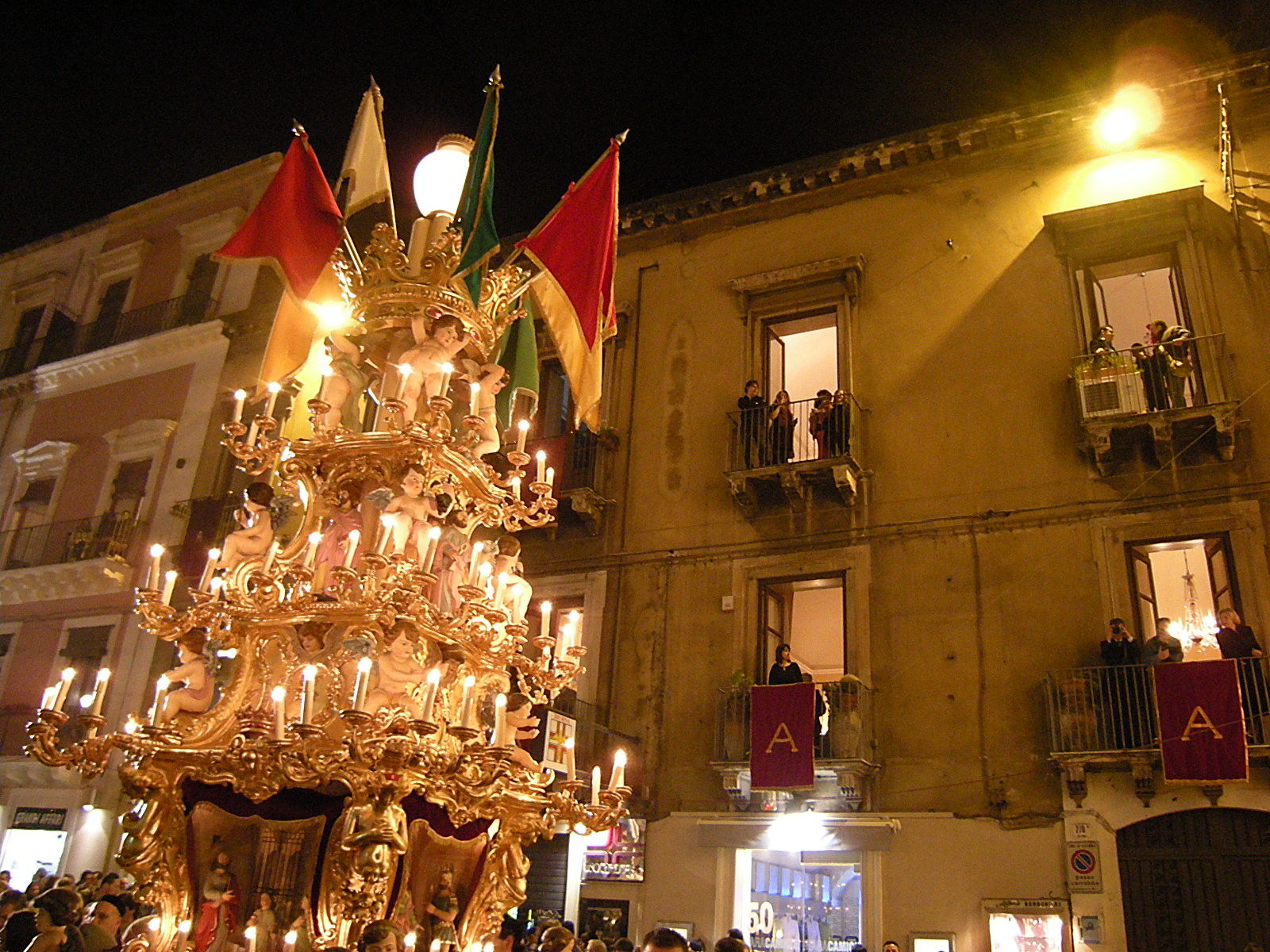
The festival of Saint Agatha takes place in Catania in the first week of February

Sicilians celebrate Saint Agatha for her purported intercession to avert danger during eruptions of Mount Etna, earthquakes, and some epidemics that had affected Catania. There is also an underlying theme of Christian resistance to Pagan oppression.

The three day festival begins at noon on 3 February with a procession known as "della luminaria". Cannalori, sixteen large candles in baroque gilt casings that proceeds from the Church of Sant'Agata alla Fornace to the Cathedral of St. Agatha. Each candelora represents one of the medieval guilds. At 3.00 PM, a cross-country race takes place through the streets of town. This is followed in the evening by a concert in the Piazza del Duomo and fireworks.

The next day, after the Messa dell'Aurora (Italian for 'Mass at Dawn'), a reliquary-bust of St. Agatha atop a silver fercola or carriage leaves the cathedral and is pulled through the neighborhoods, passing places associated with the life of the saint. The devoted followers wear the traditional white tunic that covers the body down to the ankles and is tied at the waist with a rope. The celebrations continue through the night. Gaily decorated kiosks sell traditional street food such as arancini (rice balls) and beccafico sardines (with breadcrumbs, pine nuts and raisins).

On the 5th, there is again a procession after Mass. The heavy silver carriage is pulled up a steep slope. Successful passage is considered to bode well for the rest of the year.

== Mafia ==
The Festival of Saint Agatha has been the subject of investigations by the Catania Prosecutor's Office for "Proven Mafia Infiltration"
