= Sant'Agata in Trastevere =

Saint Agatha in Trastevere
- Sant'Agata in Trastevere
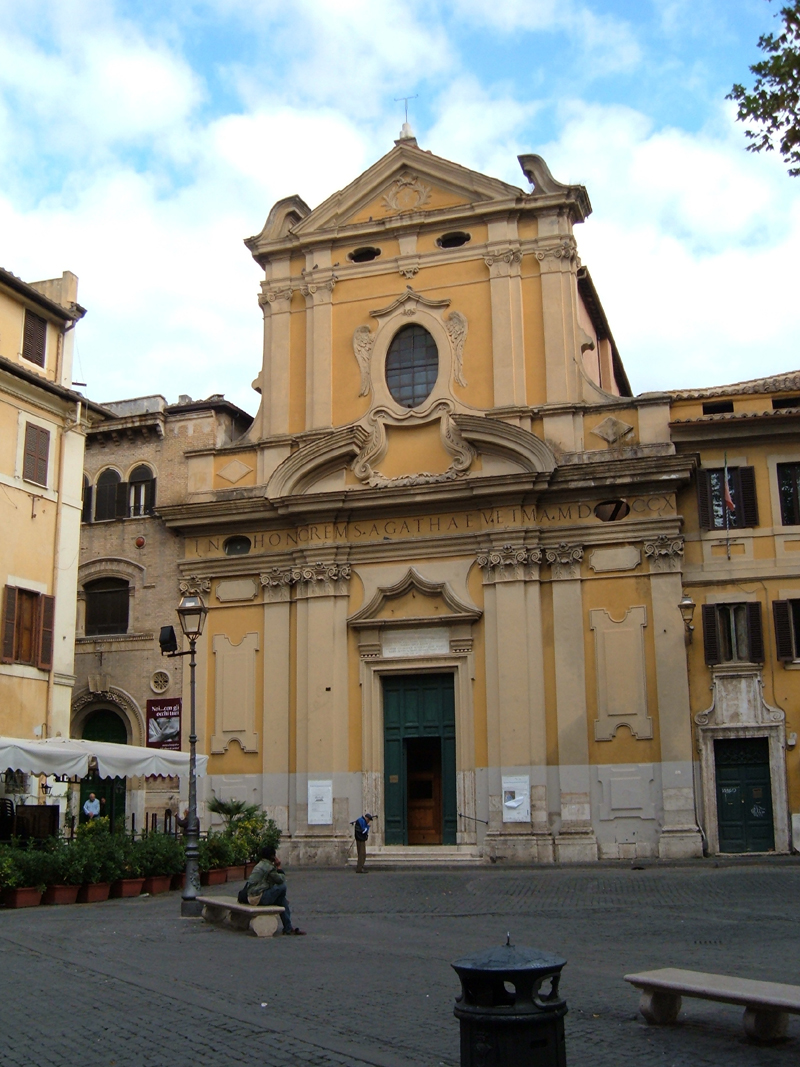
- Facade
- Click on the map for a fullscreen view
- 41°53′22″N 12°28′25″E
- Location: Largo San Giovanni de Matha, 91, Rome
- Country: Italy
- Denomination: Roman Catholic

History
- Dedication: Agatha of Sicily

Architecture
- Architect: Giacomo Recalcati
- Architectural type: Church
- Style: Late Italian Baroque architecture
- Groundbreaking: 8th century
- Completed: 8th century, 1711

Sant'Agata in Trastevere is one of the churches of Rome, located in the Trastevere district, at Largo San Giovanni de Matha, 91.

The church is dedicated to the Sicilian St Agatha, martyred in approximately 251, whose cult soon spread well beyond Sicily. She is one of several virgin martyrs who are commemorated by name in the Canon of the Mass. Agatha is also depicted in the famous mosaics of the church of Sant'Apollinare Nuovo in Ravenna, where she appears, richly dressed, in the procession of women martyrs along the north wall.

== History and art ==
The Liber Pontificalis, reports that the origins of this church was a house owned by the family of Pope Gregory II, Bishop of Rome from 715 to his death in 731, who at the death of the mother transformed it into a religious building, with an adjoining monastery. This would date it to the 8th century. It is mentioned in 1121 in a papal bull of Pope Callixtus II.

In 1575 Pope Gregory XIII granted the church to the archconfraternity of the Dottrina Cristiana, founded in 1560 by Marco de Sadis Cusani: from the title of the church, the members of the association had the name of "Agatists". In 1725 the Agatists merged into the Doctrinaries congregation of the Blessed César de Bus.

Between 1710 and 1711, under the pontificate of Clement XI, the church was completely rebuilt by Giacomo Recalcati. On this occasion it was granted to the Oratory of the Madonna del Carmine, the polychrome wooden statue, depicting the Madonna del Carmine (Our Lady of Mount Carmel), popularly called the "Madonna de Noantri", protectress of the Trastevere district.

The façade of the church is in the late-baroque style. The interior has a single nave, with three chapels on each side and a barrel vault. There are preserved, among others, works by Girolamo Troppa and Biagio Puccini. Adjacent to the church are the remains of buildings from 5th century and the Middle Ages.

The church is at the center every year of the chief Trastevere popular festival, the "Festa de Noantri".

== Gallery ==
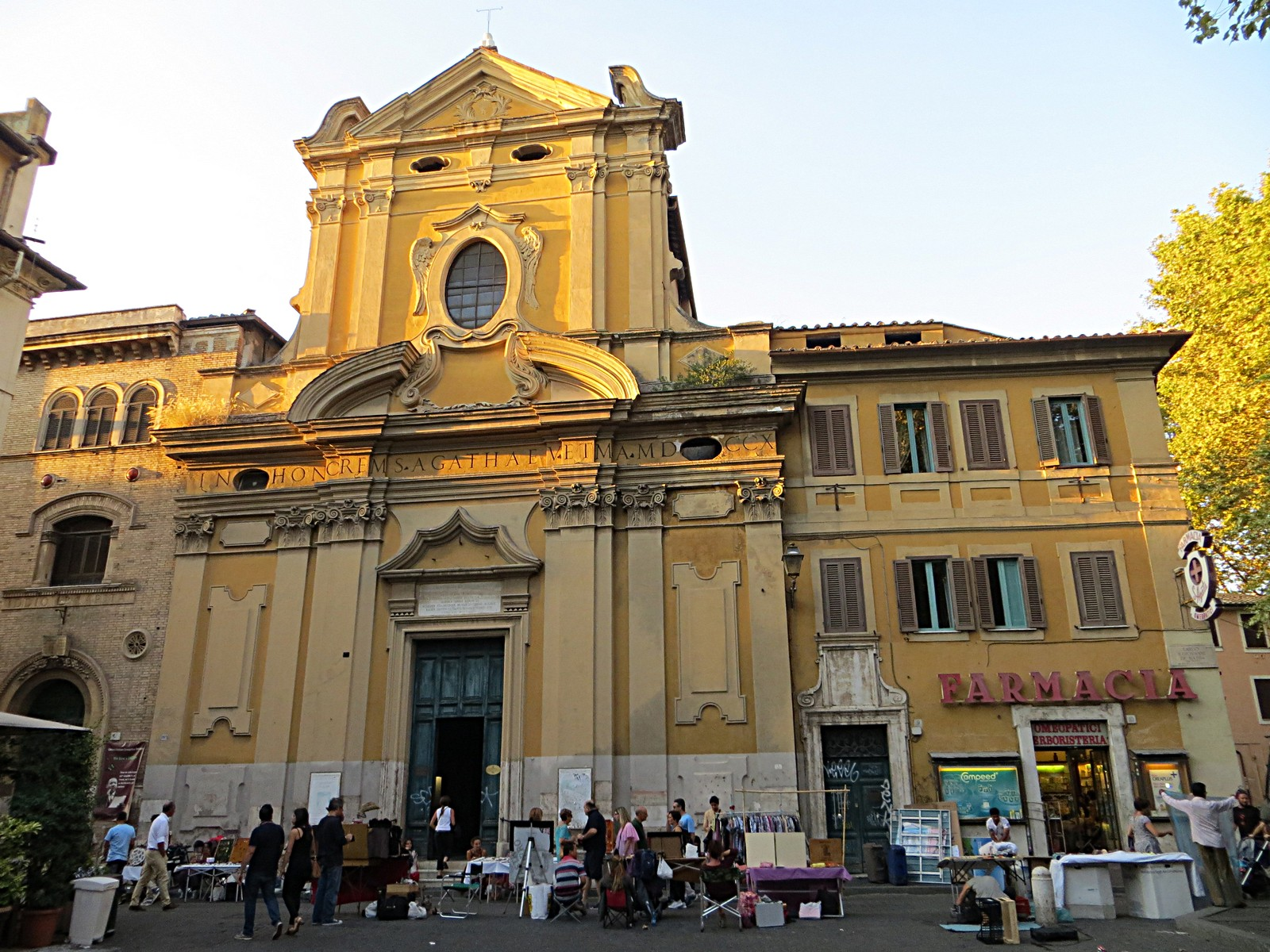
Exterior

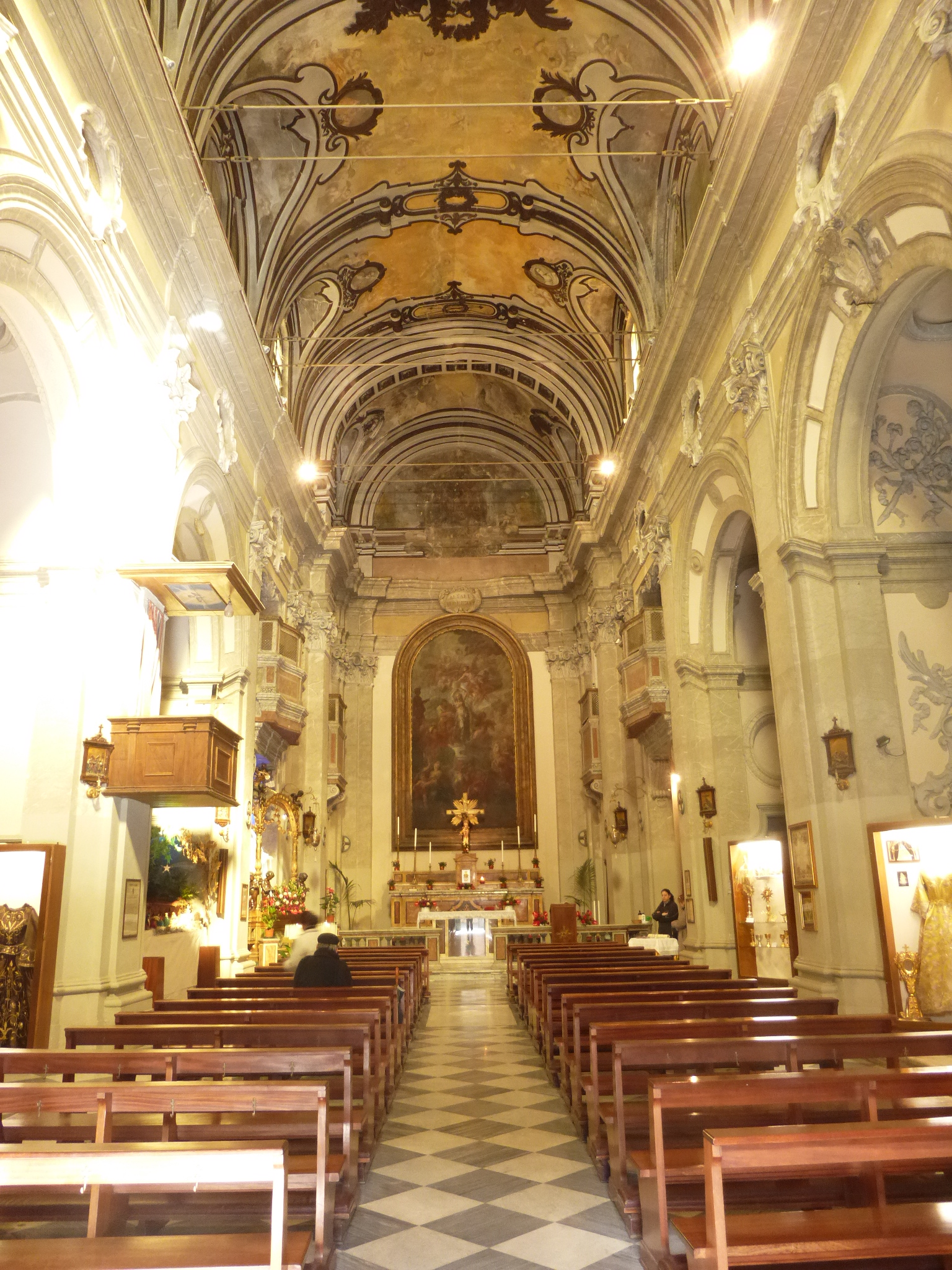
Interior

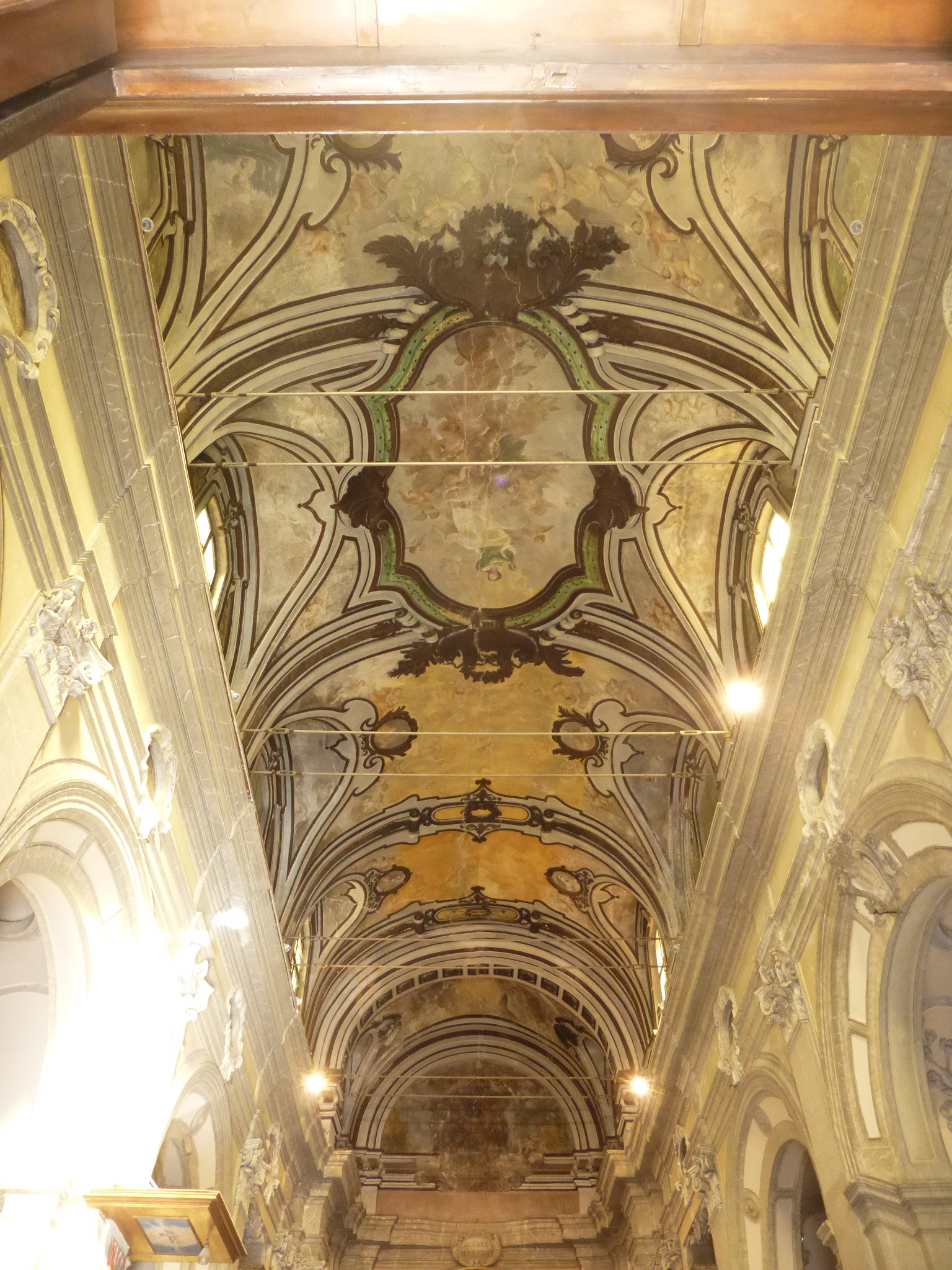
Roof

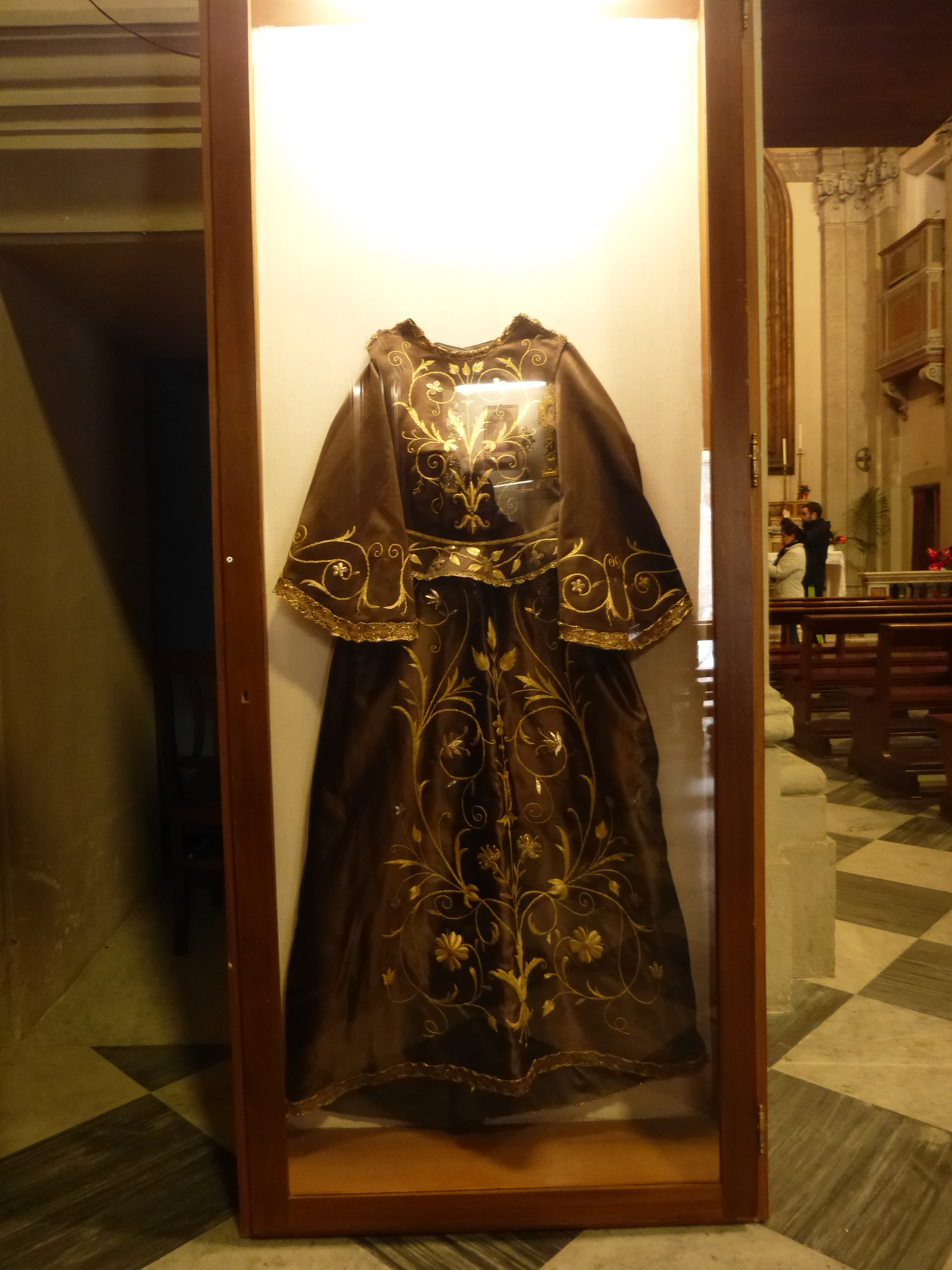
Ex-voto costume dedicated to the Madonna del Carmine, displayed at the headquarters of the Archconfraternity.

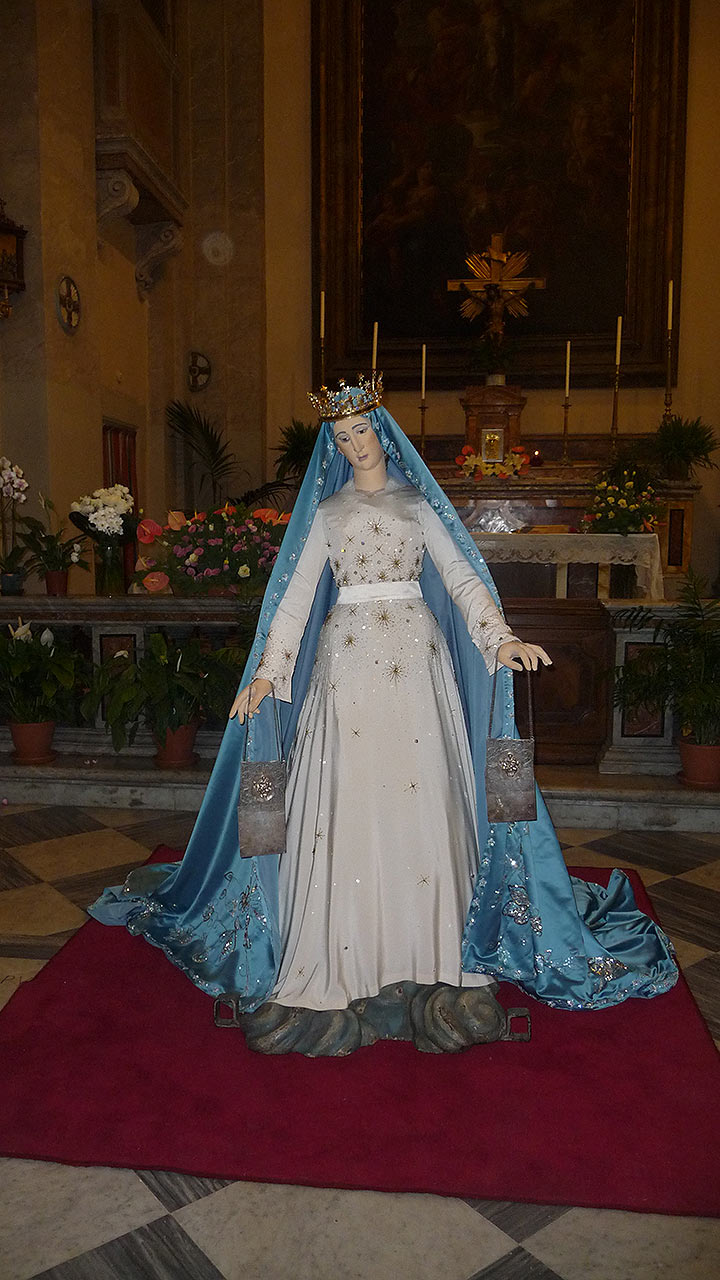
Madonna del Carmine

== Bibliography ==
- Christian Hülsen, Le chiese di Roma nel Medio Evo, Firenze 1927
- Mariano Armellini, Le chiese di Roma dal secolo IV al XIX, Rome 1891
- C. Rendina, Le Chiese di Roma, Newton & Compton Editori, Milan 2000, p. 13
- G. Carpaneto, Rione XIII Trastevere, in AA.VV, I rioni di Roma, Newton & Compton Editori, Milano 2000, Vol. III, pp. 831–923
- G. Pelliccia e G. Rocca (curr.), Dizionario degli Istituti di Perfezione (10 voll.), Edizioni paoline, Milan 1974-2003.
