= Agatha of Sicily =

Saint and virgin martyr

Saint Agatha of Sicily
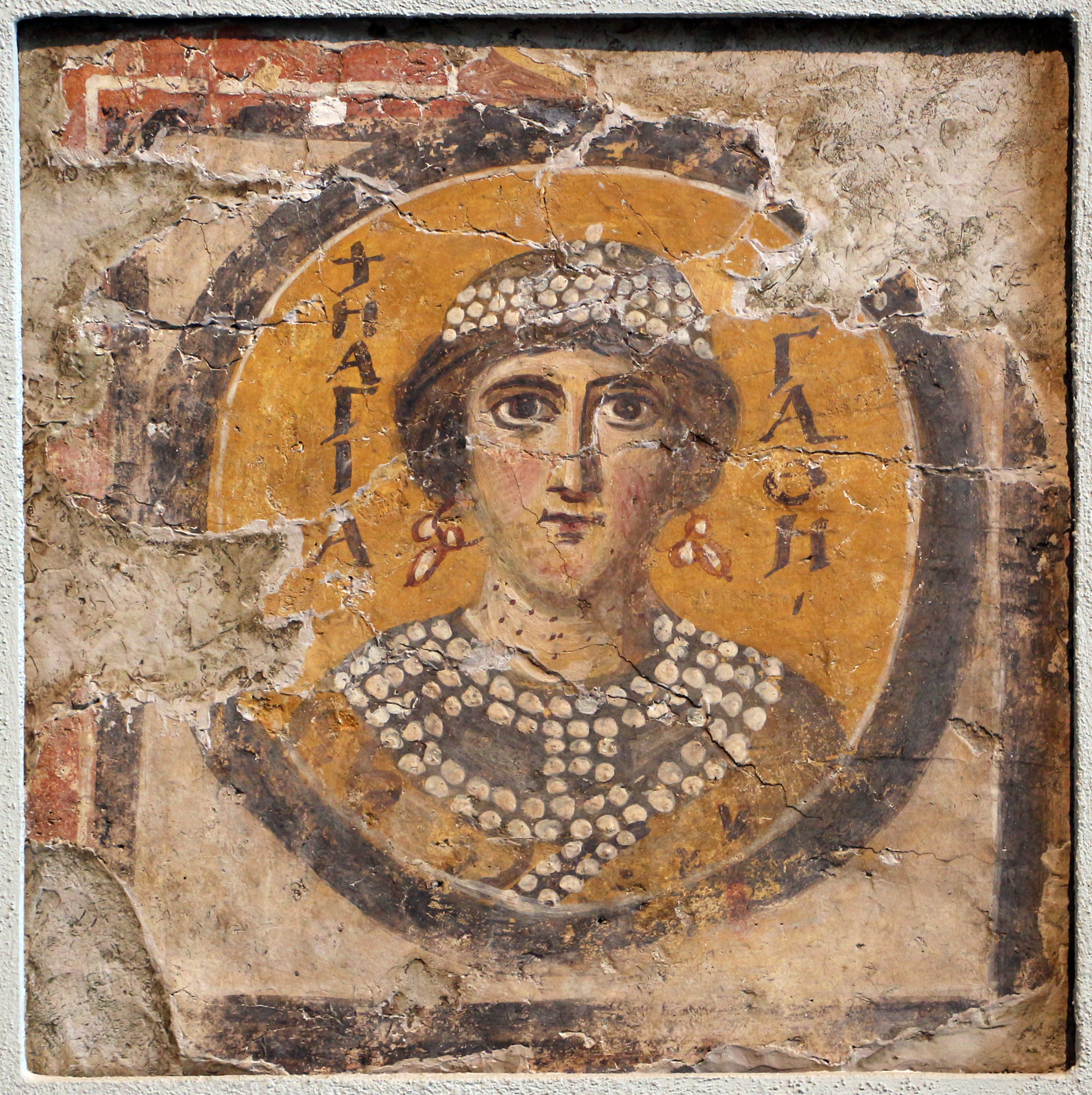

Virgin and martyr
- Born: c. 231; Catania, Sicilia, Roman Empire
- Died: c. 251 (aged 19–20); Catania, Sicilia, Roman Empire
- Cause of death: Torture
- Venerated in: Catholic Church; Eastern Orthodox Church; Oriental Orthodoxy; Anglican Communion
- Canonized: Pre-congregation by tradition confirmed by Pope Gregory I
- Feast: 5 February
- Attributes: pincers, breasts on a plate
- Patronage: Catania (Sicily), Gallipoli (Apulia), Molise, Malta, San Marino, Zamarramala (Segovia, Spain), Escatrón, (Zaragoza, Spain); bellfounders, breast cancer patients, bakers, nurses, jewelers, martyrs, virgins, rape victims, sufferers of sterility, victims of torture, natural disasters, fire, earthquakes, eruptions of Mount Etna, and volcanic eruptions

Agatha of Sicily (Note: 'Agatha' is the Latinized form of the Greek Ἀγαθή (Agathḗ), derived from the Greek ἀγαθός (agathós, meaning 'good'; Jacobus de Voragine, taking etymology in the Classical tradition, as a text for a creative excursus, made of 'Agatha' one symbolic origin in ἅγιος (hágios), 'sacred', and Θεός (Theós), 'God', and another in ἄγεος (ágeos), 'without Earth', meaning virginally untainted by earthly desires.) (c. 231 – c. 251 AD) is an early Christian virgin and martyr. Her feast is on 5 February; traditionally, it is considered the last date by which one can send New Year's greetings.

Agatha was born in Catania, part of the Roman Province of Sicily, and was martyred c. 251. She is one of several virgin martyrs who are commemorated by name in the Canon of the Mass.

Agatha is the patron saint of Catania, Molise, Malta, San Marino, Gallipoli in Apulia, (Note: The relics of St. Agatha, in particular her breasts, were stolen, on orders of the saint herself, and brought to Gallipoli in 1126. She is the patron of the cathedral of Gallipoli, of the diocese, and of the city.) and Zamarramala, a municipality of the Province of Segovia in Spain.

== Early history ==
Agatha is buried at the Badia di Sant'Agata, Catania. (Note: The present rebuilding of the ancient foundation was by Giovanni Battista Vaccarini (1767).) She is listed in the late-6th-century Martyrologium Hieronymianum associated with Jerome, and the Synaxarion, the calendar of the church of Carthage, c. 530. Agatha also appears in one of the carmina of Venantius Fortunatus.

Two early churches were dedicated in her honor in Rome, Sant'Agata in Trastevere and notably the Church of Sant'Agata dei Goti in Via Mazzarino, a titular church with apse mosaics of c. 460 and traces of a fresco cycle, (Note: The date of 460 appears in TCI, Roma e dintorni; a letter from Pope Hadrian I (died 795) to Charlemagne remarks that Gregory (died 604) ordered the church adorned with mosaics and frescoes.) overpainted by Gismondo Cerrini in 1630. In the 6th century AD, the church was adapted to Arianism, hence its name "Saint Agatha of the Goths", and later reconsecrated by Gregory the Great, who confirmed her traditional sainthood.

Agatha is also depicted in the mosaics of Sant'Apollinare Nuovo in Ravenna, where she appears, richly dressed, in the procession of virgin martyrs along the north wall. Her image forms an initial 'I' in the Sacramentary of Gellone, which dates from the end of the 8th century.

== Life ==
One of the most highly venerated virgin martyrs of Christian antiquity, Agatha was put to death during the Decian persecution (250–253) in Catania, Sicily, for her determined profession of faith.

Her written legend comprises "straightforward accounts of interrogation, torture, resistance, and triumph which constitute some of the earliest hagiographic literature", and are reflected in later recensions, the earliest surviving one being an illustrated late-10th-century passio.

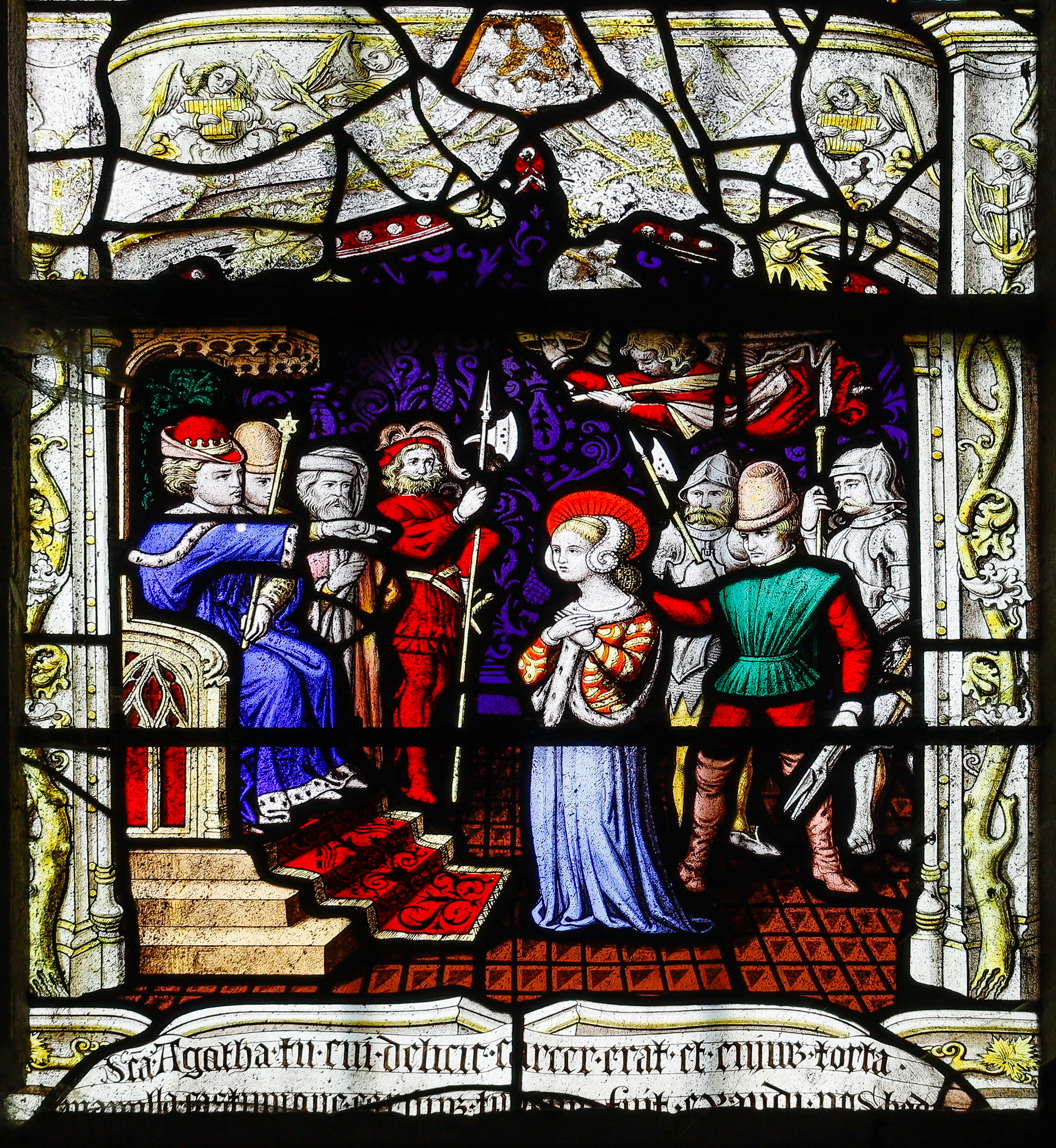
Agatha in front of the judge as depicted in a stained glass window from 1515 in Notre-Dame, Saint-Lô

According to the 13th-century Golden Legend (III.15) by Jacobus de Voragine, 15-year-old Agatha, from a rich and noble family, made a vow of virginity for Christ's sake and rejected the amorous advances of the Roman prefect Quintianus, who thought he could force her to turn away from her vow and marry him. His persistent proposals were consistently spurned by Agatha. This was during the persecutions of Decius, so Quintianus, knowing she was a Christian, reported her to the authorities. Quintianus himself was governor of the district.

Quintianus expected Agatha to give in to his demands when faced with torture and possible death, but Agatha simply reaffirmed her belief in God by praying: "Jesus Christ, Lord of all, you see my heart, you know my desires. Possess all that I am. I am your sheep: make me worthy to overcome the devil." To force her to change her mind, Quintianus sent Agatha to Aphrodisia, the keeper of a brothel, and had her imprisoned there; however, the punishment failed, with Agatha remaining a Christian.

Quintianus sent for Agatha again, arguing with her and threatening her, before finally having her imprisoned and tortured. She was stretched on a rack to be torn with iron hooks, burned with torches, and whipped. Her breasts were removed by tongs.

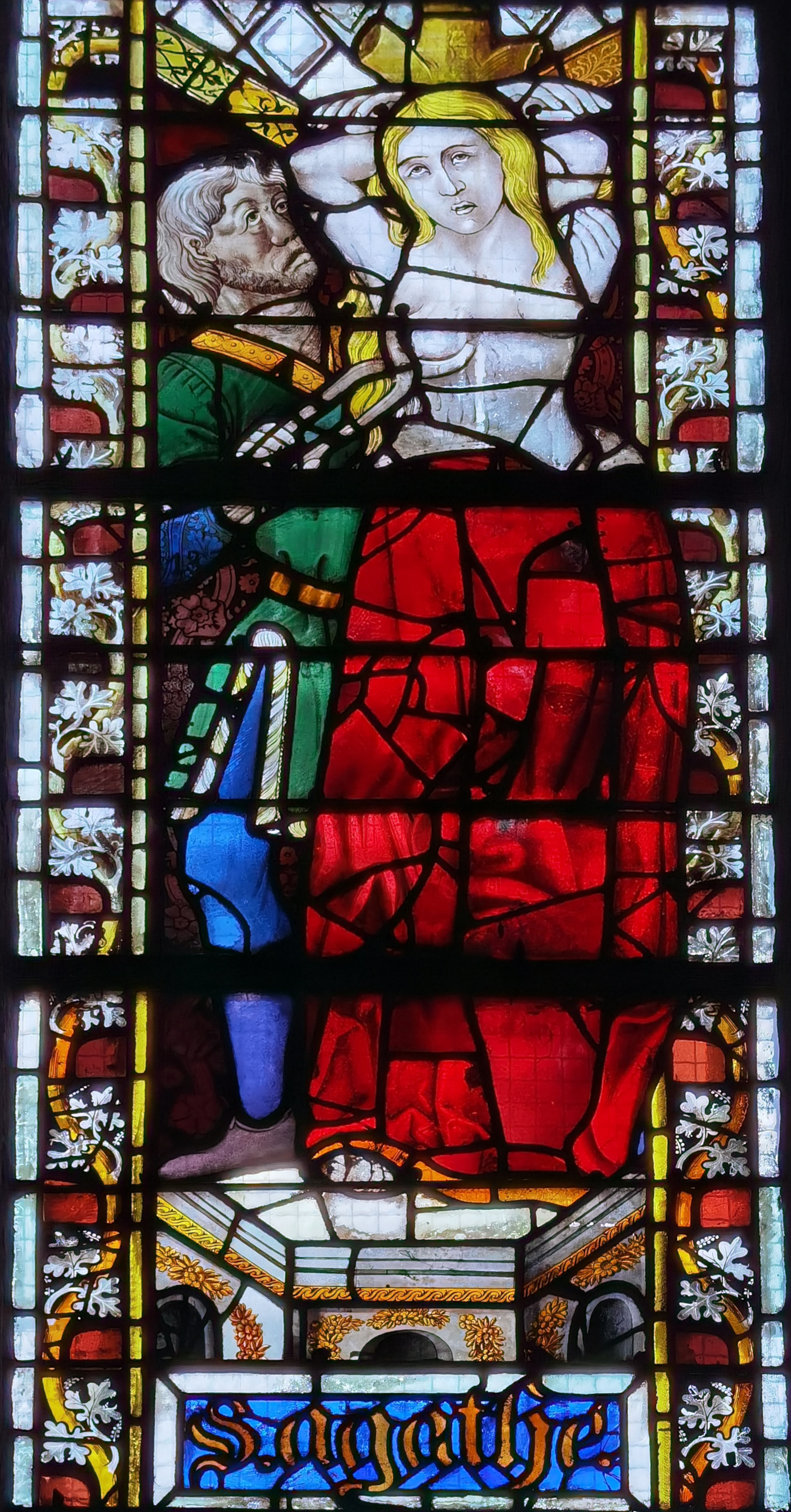
St Agatha as depicted in a stained glass window in Rouen Cathedral

After further dramatic confrontations with Quintianus, represented in a sequence of dialogues in her passio that document her fortitude and steadfast devotion, Agatha was then sentenced to be burnt at the stake; however, an earthquake prevented this from happening, and she was instead sent to prison, where St. Peter the Apostle appeared to her and healed her wounds.

Agatha died in prison, probably in the year 251 according to the Legenda Aurea. Although the martyrdom of Agatha is authenticated, and her veneration as a saint had spread beyond her native place even in antiquity, there is no reliable information concerning the details of her death. Osbern Bokenam, A Legend of Holy Women, written in the 1440s, offers some further detail.

== Veneration ==
According to Maltese tradition, during the persecution of Roman Emperor Decius (AD 249–251), Agatha, together with some of her friends, fled from Sicily and took refuge in Malta. Some historians believe that her stay on the island was rather short, and she spent her days in a rock-hewn crypt at Rabat, praying and teaching Christianity to children. After some time, Agatha returned to Sicily, where she faced martyrdom. Agatha was arrested and brought before Quintianus, praetor of Catania, who condemned her to torture and imprisonment.

The crypt of St. Agatha is an underground basilica, which from early ages was venerated by the Maltese. At the time of St. Agatha's stay, the crypt was a small natural cave, which, later on, during the 4th or 5th century, was enlarged and embellished.

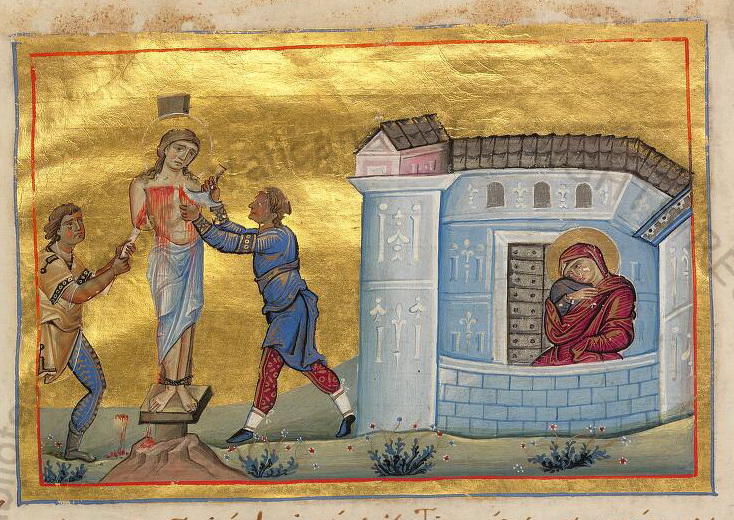
Miniature from the Menologion of Basil II

After the Reformation era, Agatha was retained in the calendar of the Church of England's Book of Common Prayer with her feast on 5 February. Several Church of England parish churches are dedicated in her honor.

A feast day on 5 February was given final authorization in the Episcopal Church in 2022. The translation of her relics is commemorated on 10 March and 17 August.

=== Festival of Saint Agatha in Catania ===
The Festival of Saint Agatha in Catania is a major one in the region, it takes place during the first five days of February. The Cathedral of Saint Agatha is dedicated to her.

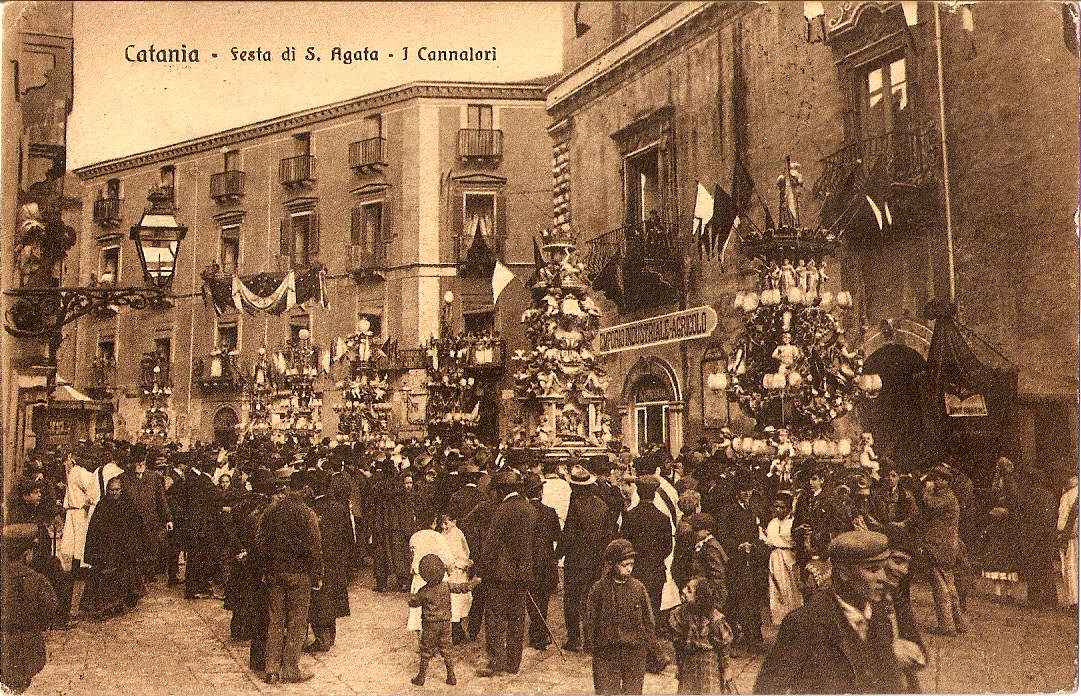
The Festival of Saint Agatha in 1915

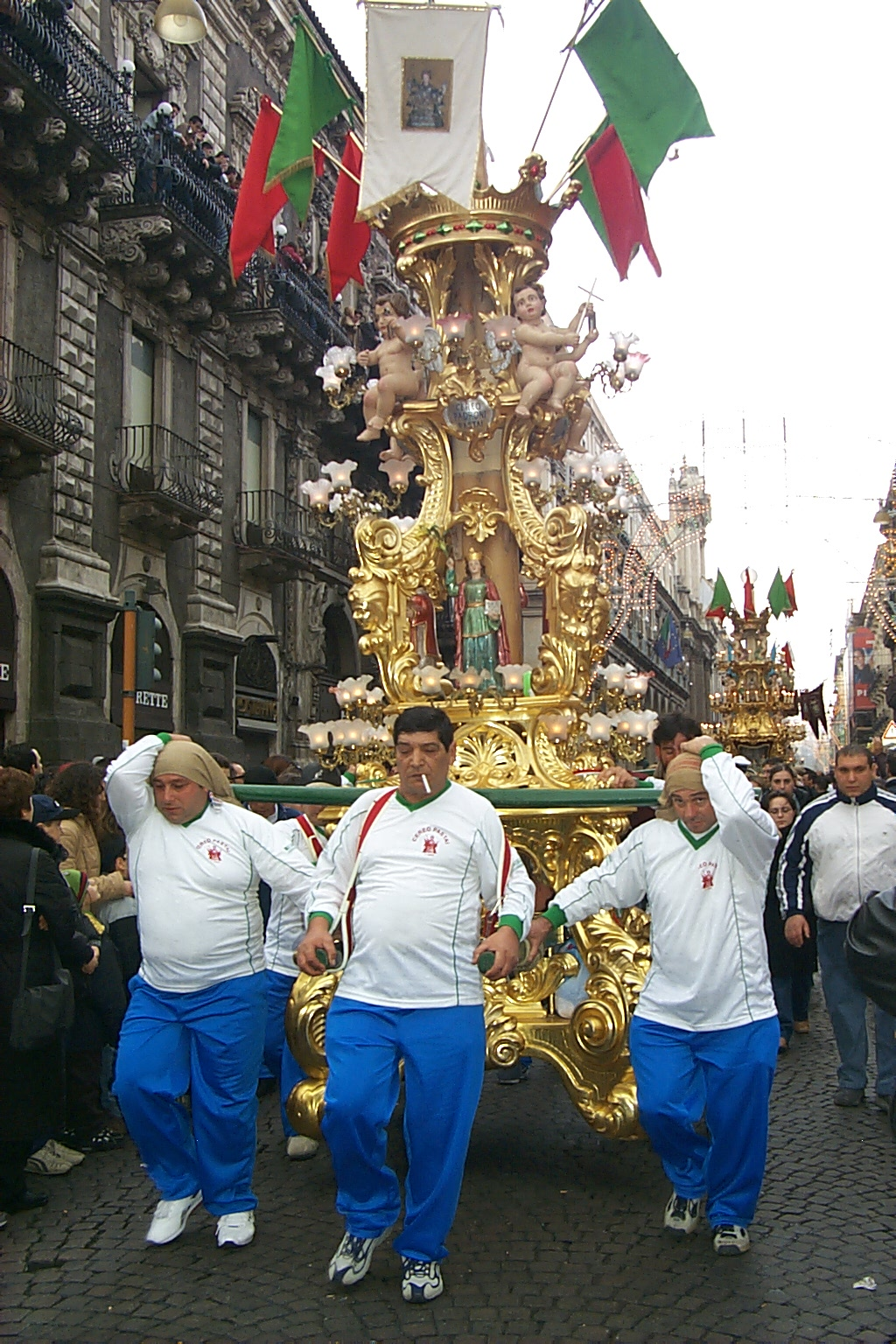
The Festival of Saint Agatha in 2007

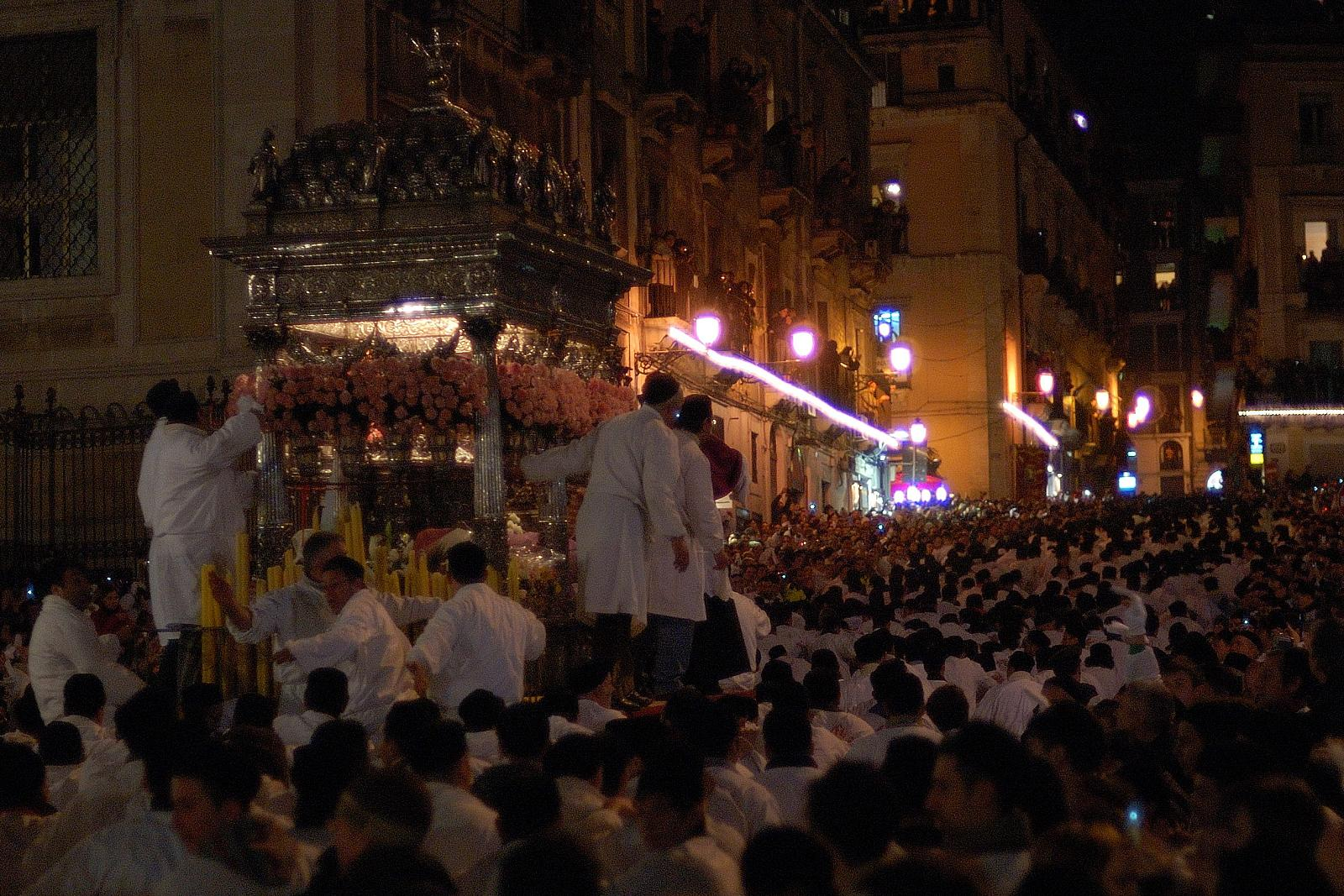
The Festival of Saint Agatha in 2008

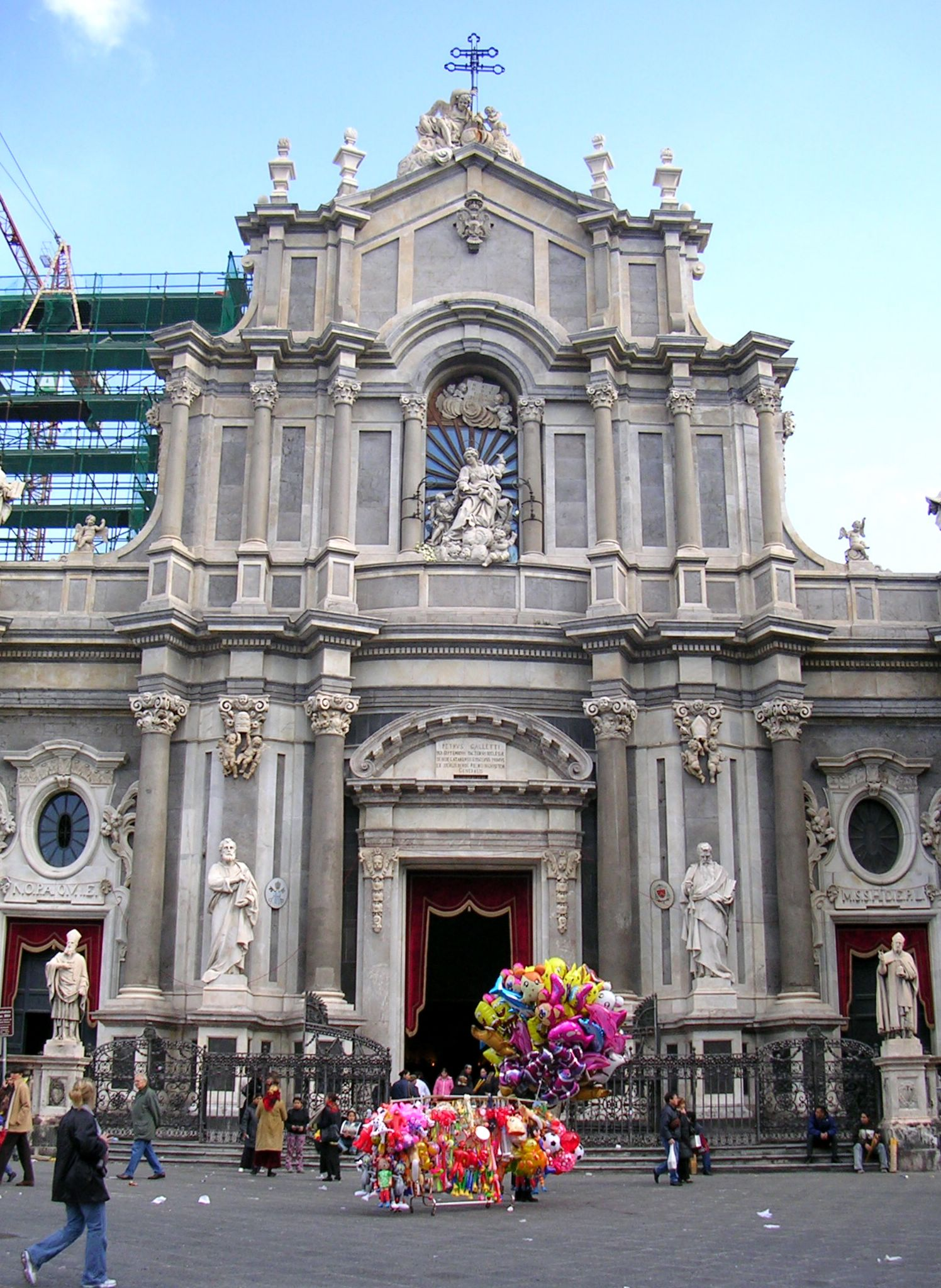
Catania's duomo during the festival

== Patronage ==
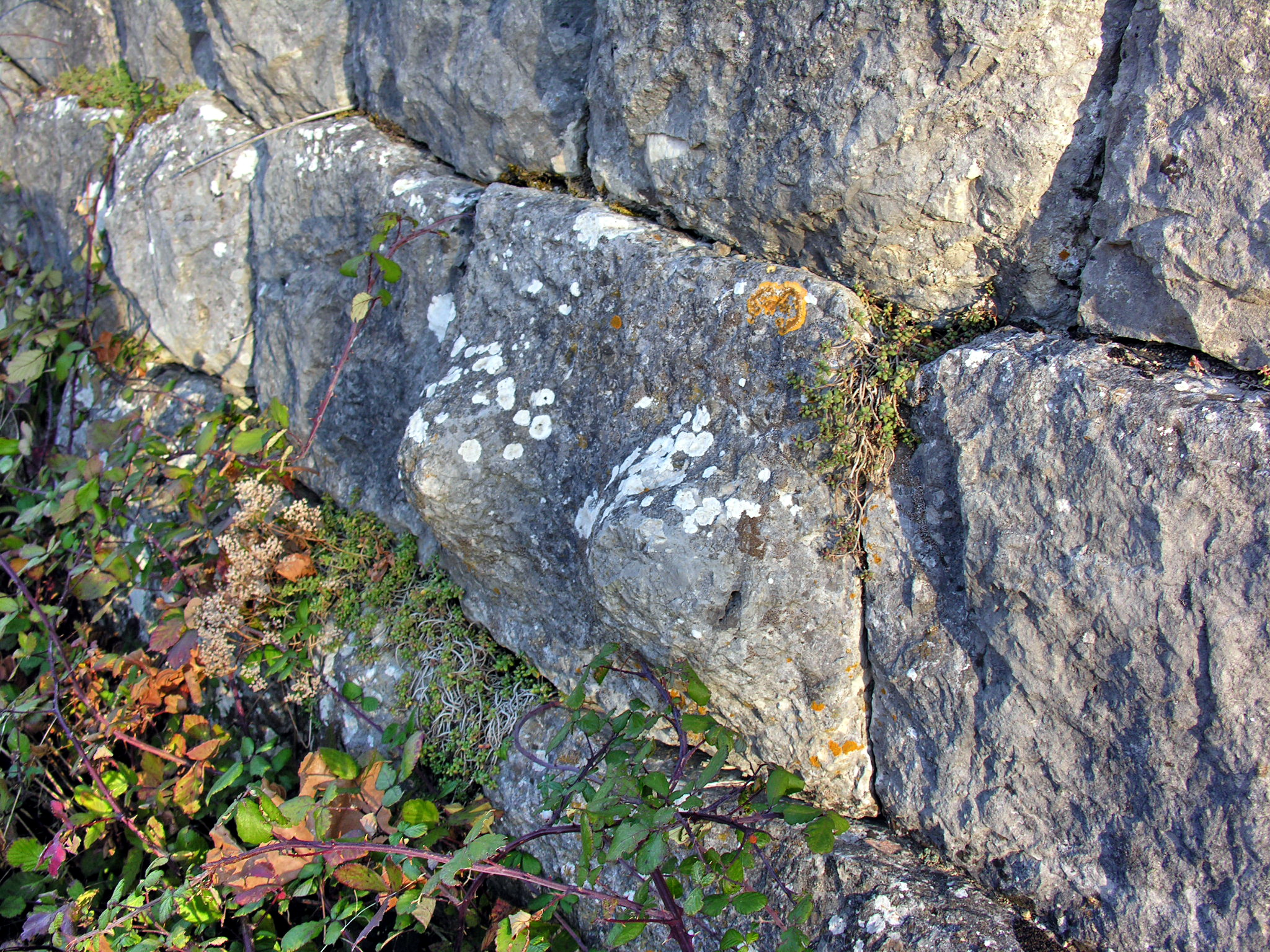
Saint Agatha's breasts sculpted in the fortification walls at Mons, Var in the south of France

Saint Agatha is the patron saint of rape victims, breast cancer patients, wet nurses, and bellfounders (due to the shape of her severed breasts). She is also considered to be a powerful intercessor when people suffer from fires. Her feast day is celebrated on 5 February.

She is also a patron saint of Malta, where in 1551 her intercession through a reported apparition to a Benedictine nun is said to have saved Malta from Turkish invasion.

She became the patron saint of the Republic of San Marino after Pope Clement XII restored the independence of the state on her feast day of 5 February 1740.

She is also the patron saint of Catania, Sorihuela del Guadalimar (Spain), Molise, San Marino and Kalsa, a historical quarter of Palermo.

She is claimed as the patron of Palermo. The year after her death, the stilling of an eruption of Mount Etna was attributed to her intercession. As a result, apparently, people continued to ask her prayers for protection against fire.

In Switzerland, Agatha is considered the patron saint of fire services.

In the United Kingdom, Agatha is the patron saint of bell ringers in service of the Catholic Church.

== Iconography ==
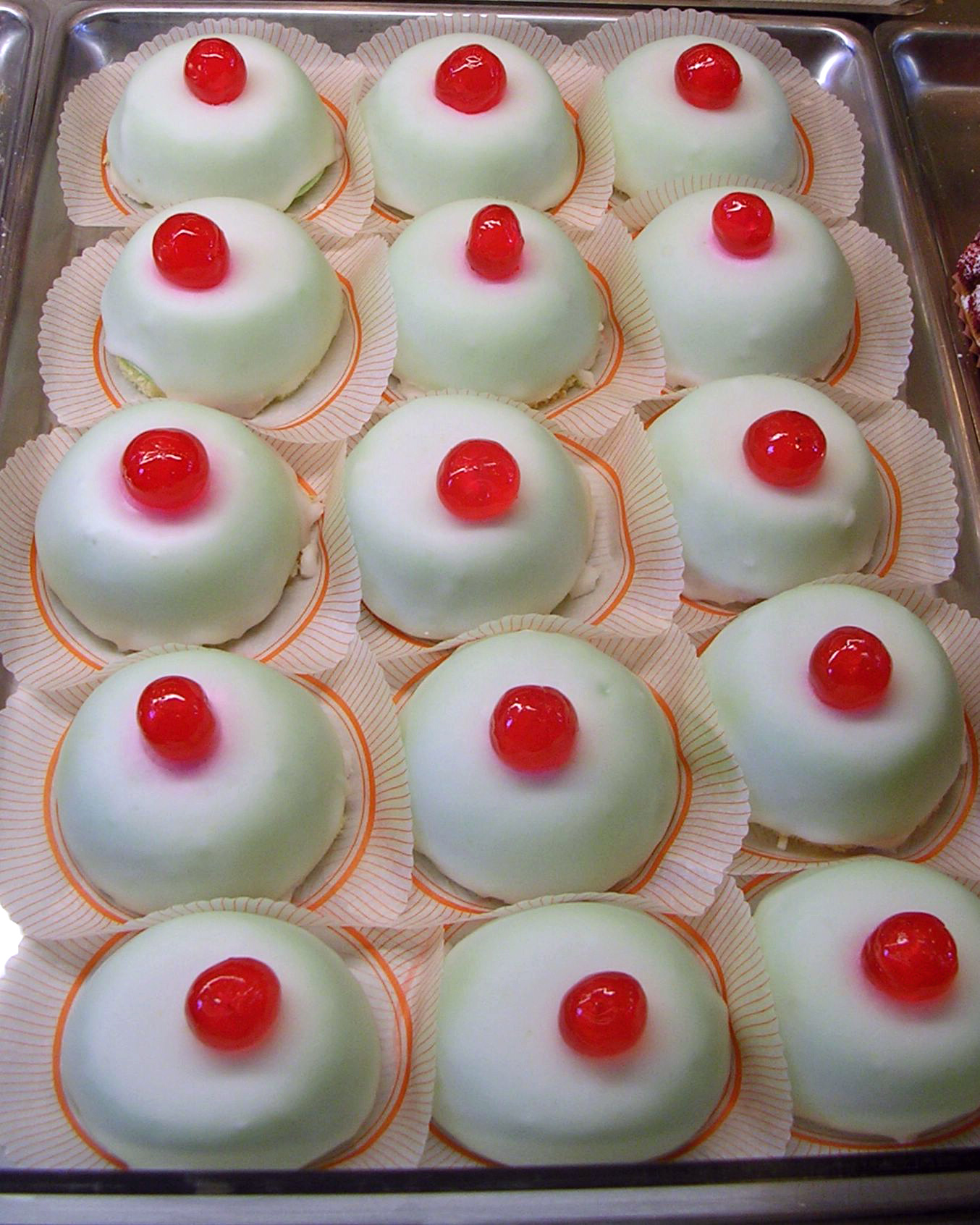
Minne di Sant'Agata, a typical Sicilian sweet shaped as a breast, representing the cut breasts of Saint Agatha

Saint Agatha is often depicted iconographically carrying her excised breasts on a platter, as in Bernardino Luini's Saint Agatha (1510–1515) in the Galleria Borghese, Rome, in which Agatha contemplates the breasts on a standing salver held in her hand.

The tradition of making shaped pastry on the feast of St. Agatha, such as Agatha bread or buns, or so-called Minne di Sant'Agata ("Breasts of St. Agatha") or Minni di Virgini ("Breasts of the virgin"), is found in many countries.

== Legacy ==
The Basque people have a tradition of gathering on Saint Agatha's Eve (Basque: Santa Ageda bezpera) and going door-to-door through their village. Homeowners can then choose to hear a song about Agatha's life, which is accompanied by the beats of the choir's walking sticks on the ground or else a prayer for the household's deceased. After that, the homeowner donates food to the choir. The song's lyrics vary according to each local tradition and the Basque language dialect spoken locally. In 1937, during the Spanish Civil War, a version of the song in Spanish was composed. In the lyrics, this Spanish version praised the Soviet ship Komsomol, which had sunk while carrying Soviet weapons to the Second Spanish Republic.

An annual festival to commemorate the life of Saint Agatha takes place in Catania, Sicily, from 3 to 5 February. The festival culminates in an all-night procession through the city.

St. Agatha's Tower is a former Knight's stronghold located in the north west of Malta. The seventeenth-century tower served as a military base during both World Wars and was used as a radar station by the Maltese army.

St. Agatha is also commemorated in literature. The Italian poet Martha Marchina wrote an epigram in Musa Posthuma that commemorates her martyrdom. In it, Marchina characterizes Agatha as powerful and she reclaims that power because she has become more beautiful through her wounds.

Agatha of Sicily is honored with a Lesser Feast on the liturgical calendar of the Episcopal Church in the United States of America on 5 February.

=== In art ===
Agatha is a featured figure on Judy Chicago's 1979 installation piece The Dinner Party, being represented as one of the 999 names on the Heritage Floor.

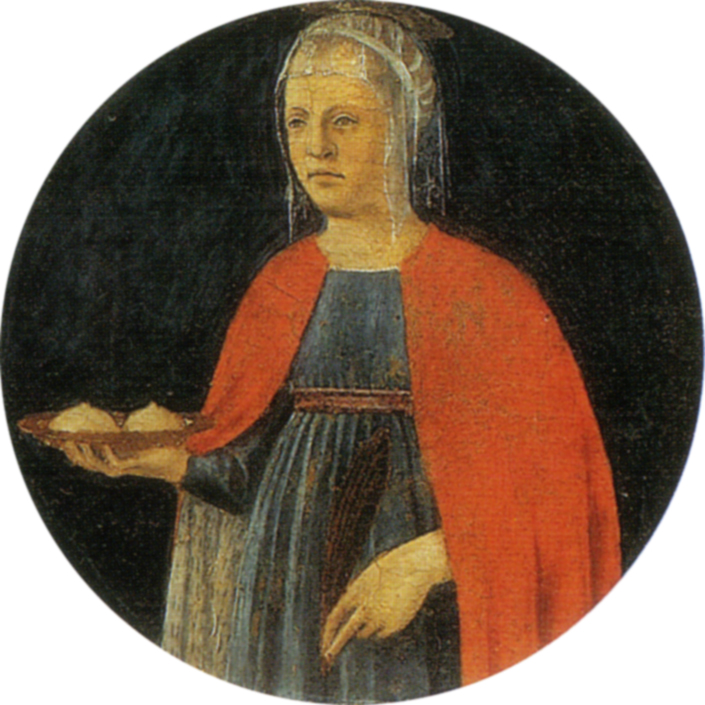
Saint Agatha bearing her severed breasts on a platter, by Piero della Francesca (c. 1460–1470)

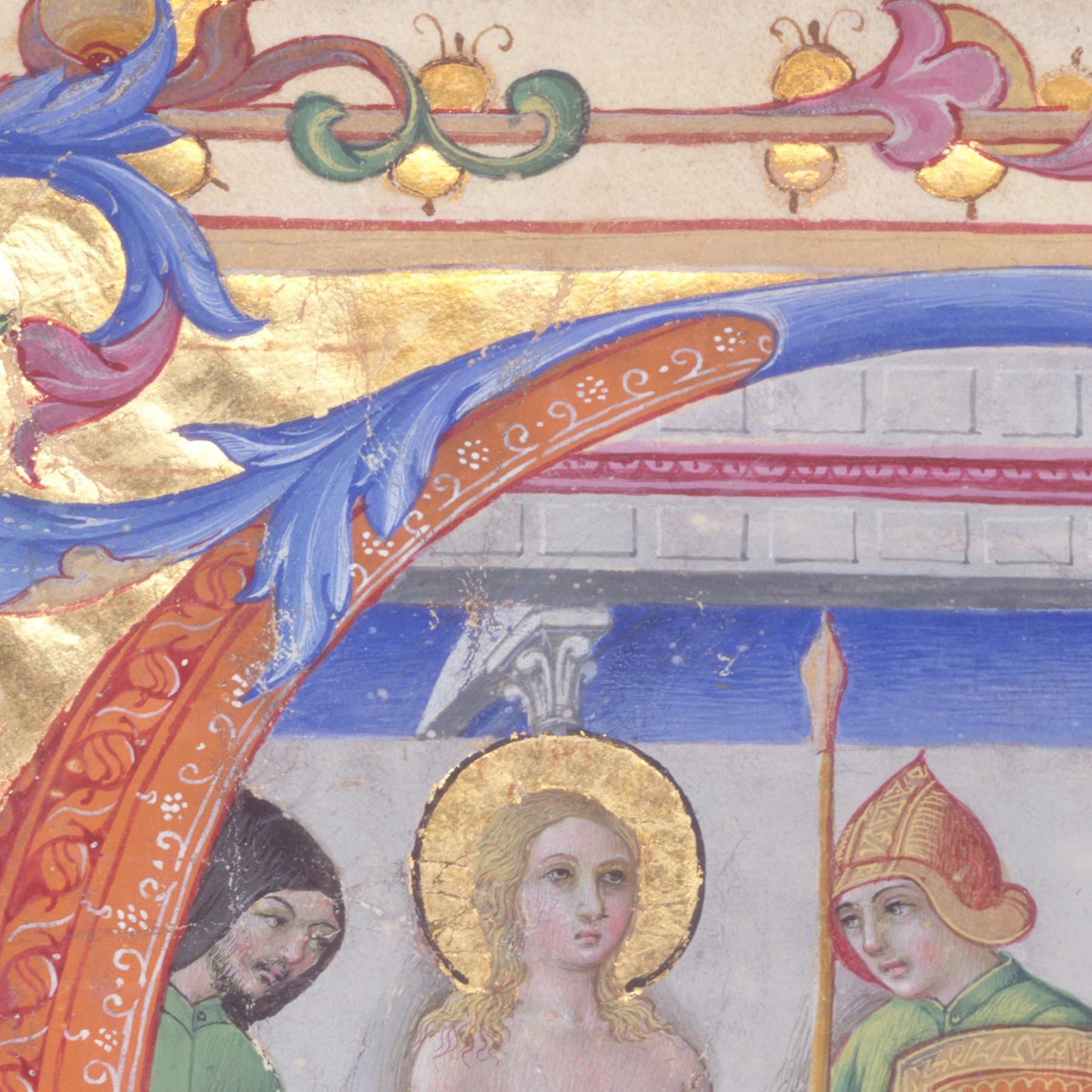
Sano di Pietro, Martyrdom of Saint Agatha in an Initial D (1470–73)

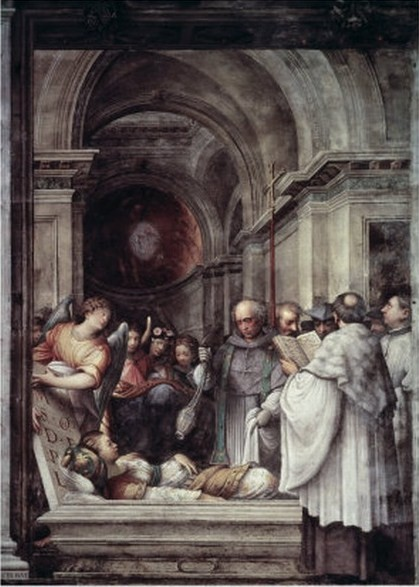
Burial of St Agatha, by Giulio Campi, 1537

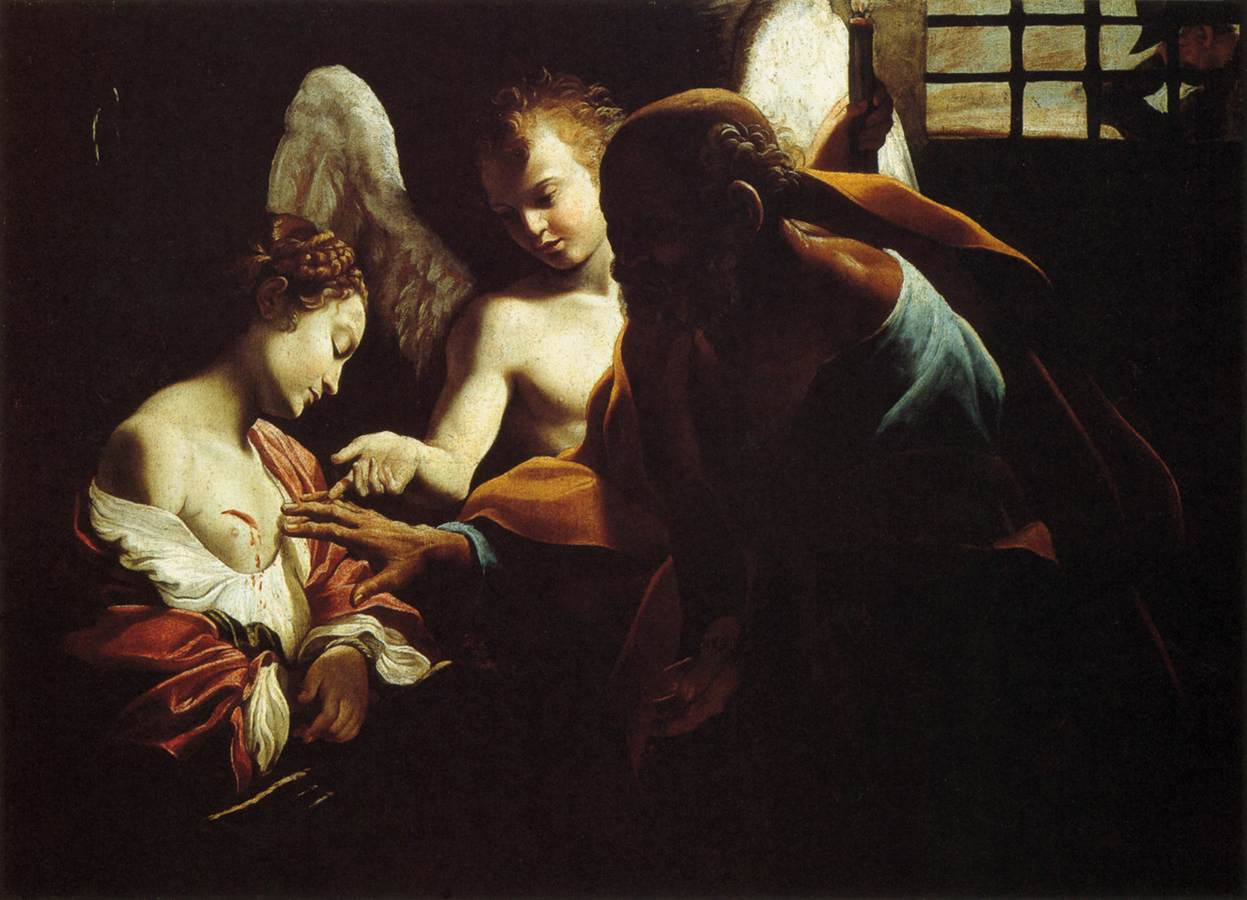
Saint Peter Healing Agatha, by the Caravaggio-follower Giovanni Lanfranco, c. 1614

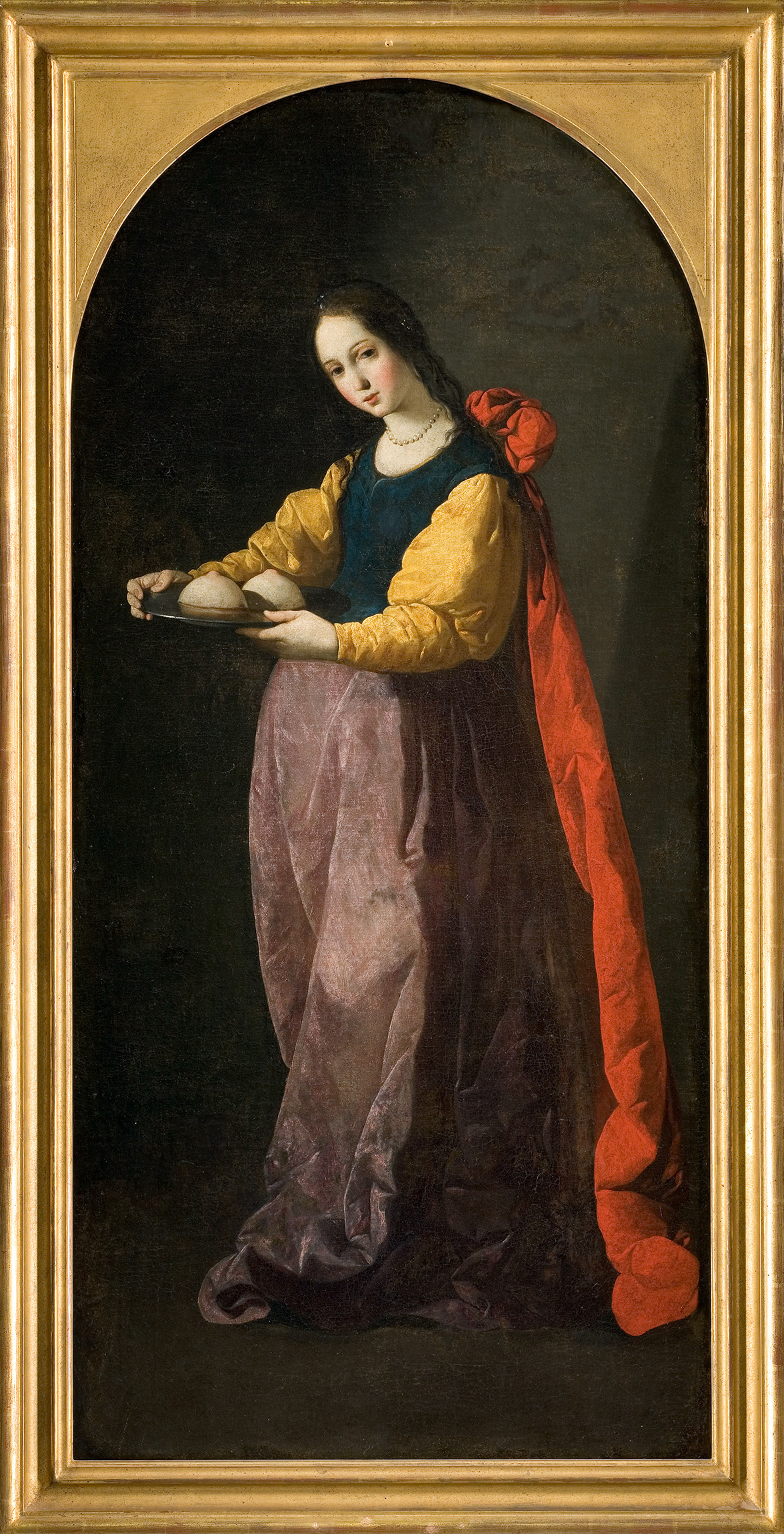
Francisco de Zurbarán, Saint Agatha (1630–1633)

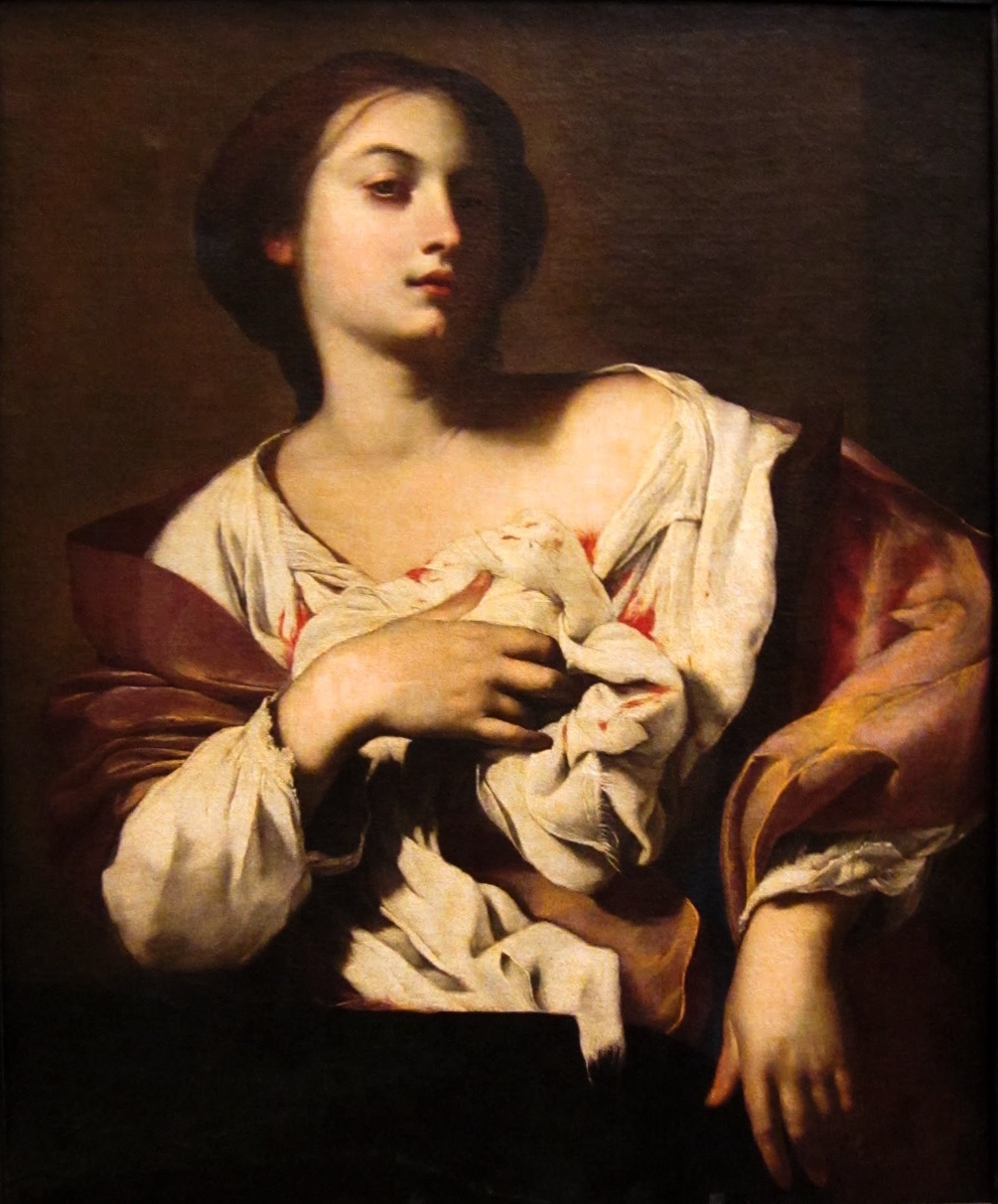
Sant'Agata, Francesco Guarini (1637)

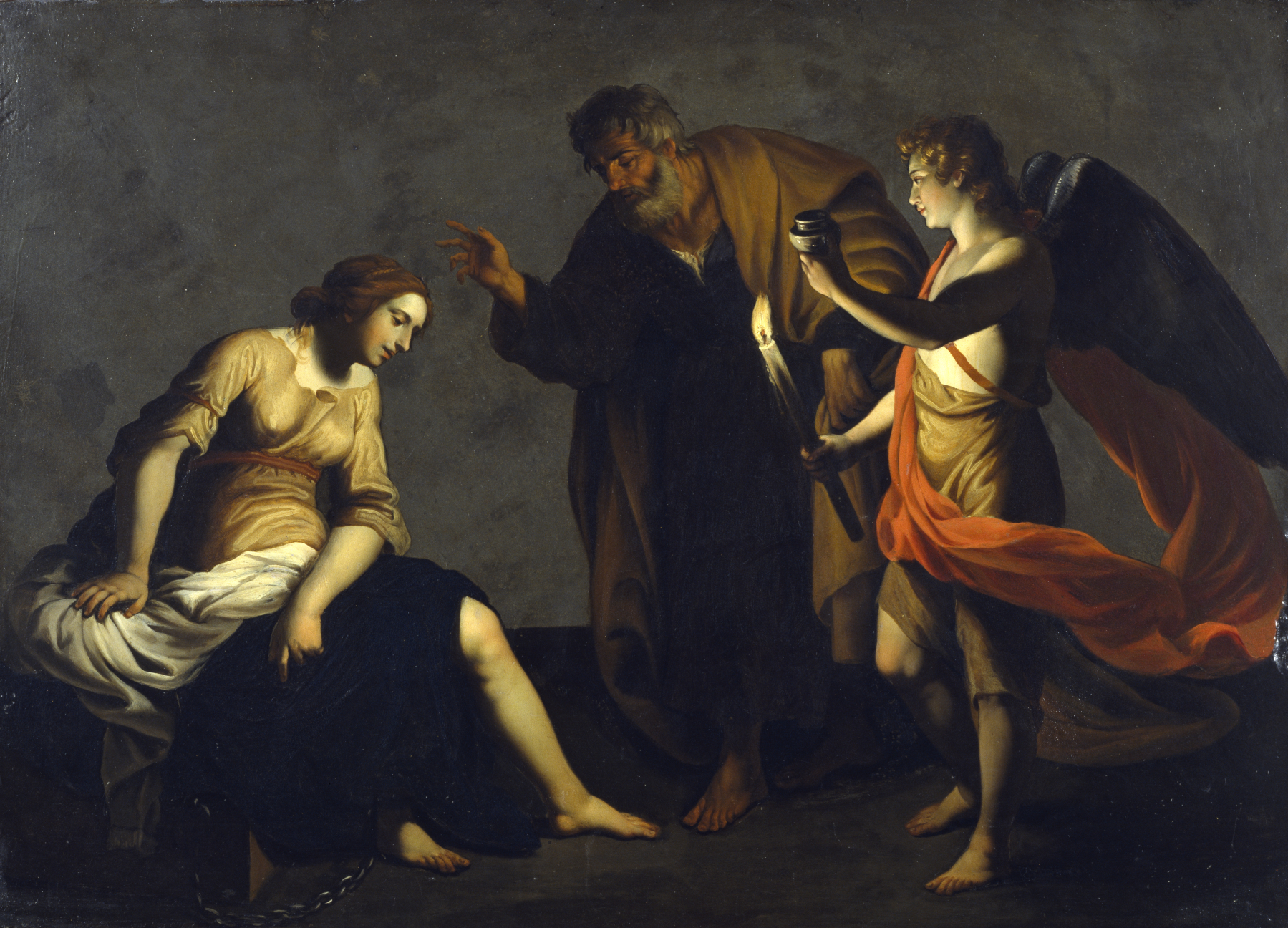
Alessandro Turchi, Saint Agatha Attended by Saint Peter and an Angel in Prison, The Walters Art Museum (1640-1645)

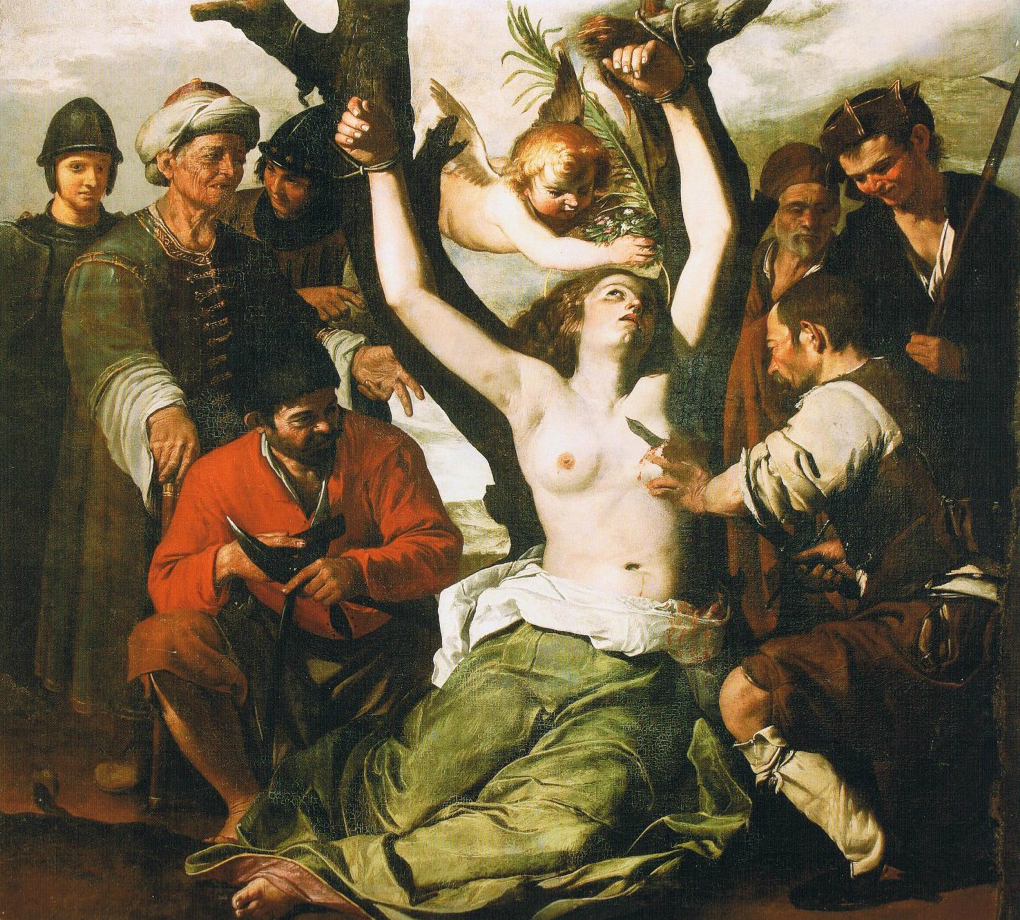
Francesco Guarino, Martirio di sant'Agata (taglio dei seni) - Church of Sant'Agata Irpina (1640)

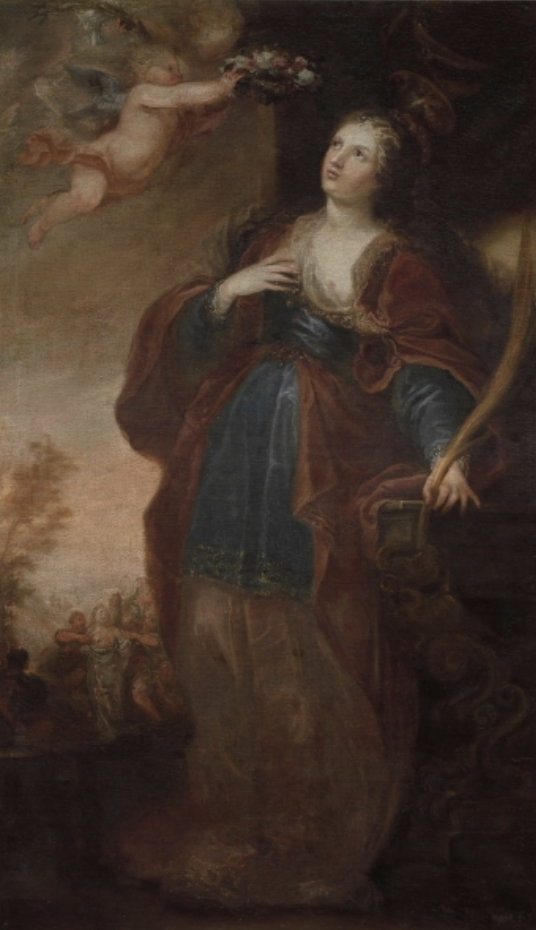
Francisco Rizi, Saint Agatha (1680)

== See also ==
- List of Catholic saints
- Santa Gadea, a church of historical importance devoted to Agatha, located in Burgos
- Breast tax, head tax on women in Travancore
- Nangeli, woman who cut her breast in protest
