= Gebildbrot =

Bread or bakery in the form of a figurative depiction

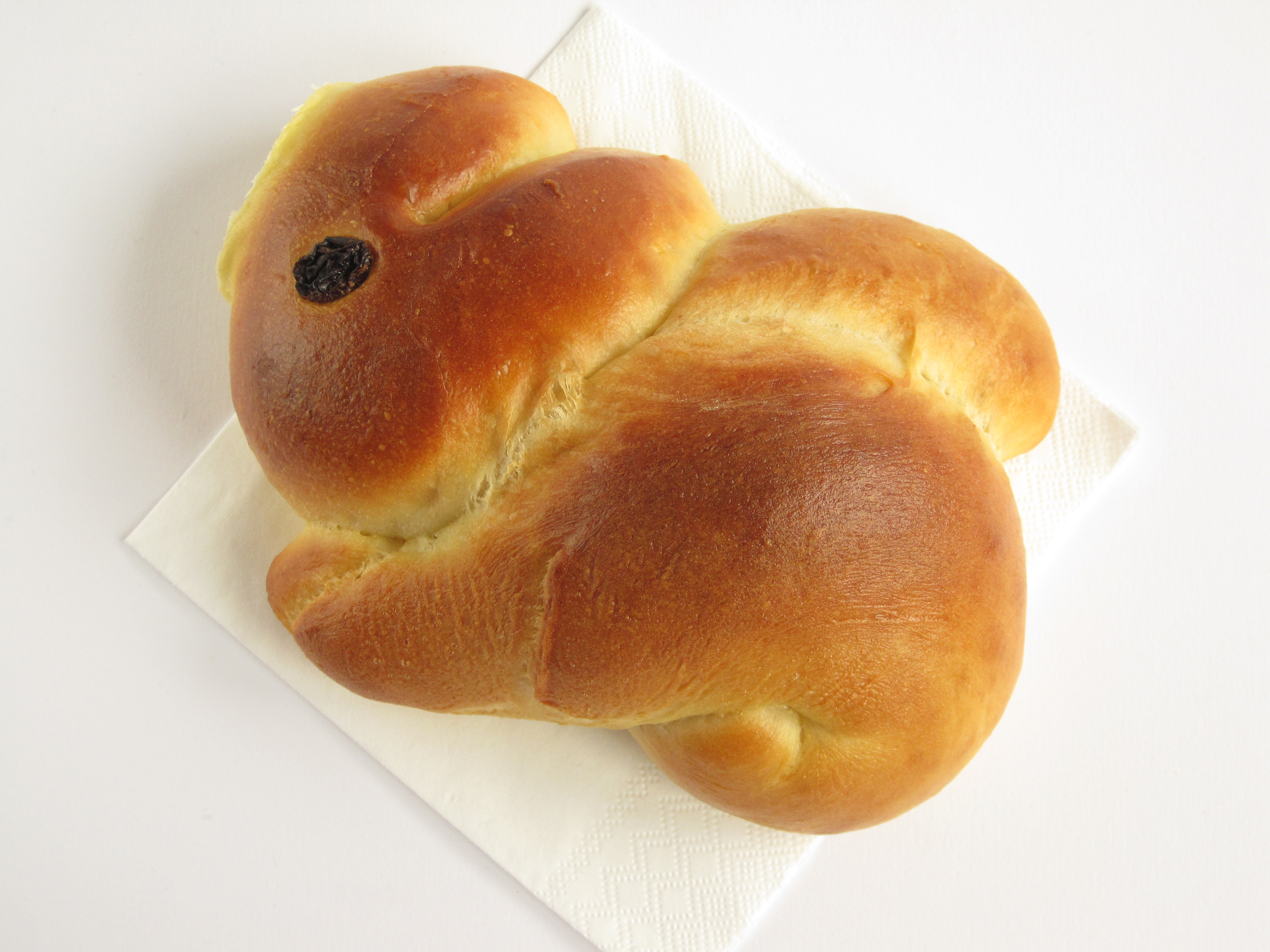
Easter bunny made of yeast dough

Gebildbrot (German: [ɡəˈbɪltbʁoːt]) is a bread or pastry in forms of figurative representations, such as a human, hare, bird or other braidings of dough. Traditionally this pastry is made for and consumed on certain feasts of the liturgical year.

== History ==
In early forms of funeral feasts, spiced breads were eaten at funerals to ward off evil spirits.

The term Gebildbrot (from the German word for "shaped bread") was used first by the German historian and folklorist Ernst Ludwig Rochholz (1809–1892). The German Folklore Dictionary, published in 1974, is already critical of such opinions of the “popular mythologists of the 19th century”, although it gives a detailed account of them. Rather, one should reckon with the "personal drive to sculpt the manufacturer and with baker's whims" or the requirements of the baking process (perforation, splitting).

Most common pastries are made from yeast dough, which has been traceable since the 15th century. Around 1700 there were yeast cultivations, which were primarily aimed at the needs of beer brewers and schnapps distillers and were not very suitable for bakers. It was not until the 19th century that new brewery technologies made sufficient baker's yeast available. From this alone, the pre-Christian cultic theories lead ad absurdum.

== Well-known Gebildbrote ==
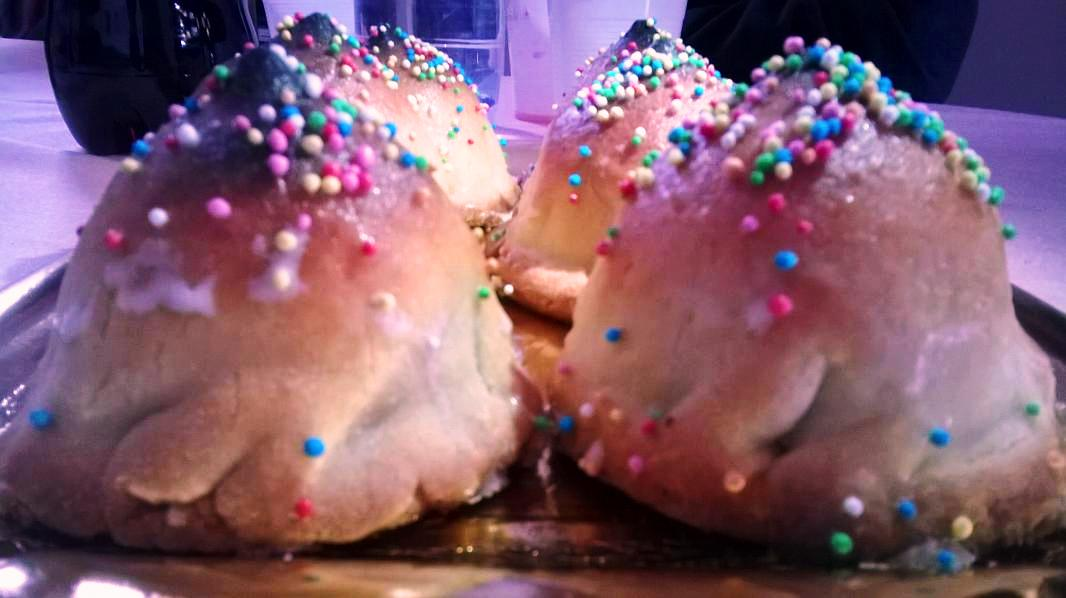
Minne di Sant’Agata

- pretzels (which were originally as a pastry made for lenten seasons)
- yeast braids
- Aachener Printen
- gingerbread in form of hearts, stars, sun, moon, also
- gingerbread men for various feasts, for example St. John's bread, "Klausenmann" for Saint Nicholas Day
- Speculaas is one of the most popular forms of Gebildbrot. These flat biscuits of seasoned shortcrust pastry are traditionally made around Saint Nicholas' day in the Netherlands, Belgium, Luxembourg, and around Christmas in Germany and Austria.
- Saint Agatha's bread for Saint Agatha's day on 5 February. While Saint Agatha's breads (or buns) are usually made in Germany, in Italy, especially in Sicily, special sweets in the form of breasts are common, called Minni de virgine or Minne di Sant’Agata ("Saint Agatha's breasts"). St. Agatha's bread is usually blessed by a priest or a deacon in the bakery, prior to be sold.
- various Easter breads
- Easter lamb with flag
- various pastry in the form of birds for the Feast of the Ascension
- in Sweden saffron buns in various forms, known as Lussekatter, are made for Saint Lucy's Day
- So-called Hedwigssohlen (shoe soles of St. Hedwig) are made in some regions on the occasion of Saint Hedwig of Silesia's feast. The pastry originates from the Saint's habit to walk barefoot and wear the shoes in her hand, since her confessor ordered her to "wear shoes".
