= Excursus =

An excursus (from Latin excurrere, 'to run out of') is a short episode or anecdote in a work of literature. Often excursuses have nothing to do with the matter being discussed by the work, and are used to lighten the atmosphere in a tragic story, a similar function to that of satyr plays in Greek theatre. Sometimes they are used to provide backstory to the matter being discussed at hand, as in Pseudo-Apollodorus' Bibliotheke. In the Middle Ages, the excursus is a favourite rhetorical device to allow the narrator to comment or to suspend the action for reflection. Furthermore, an excursus is often applied to a piece of academic writing to provide digressive information, which does not contribute directly to the line of argument but can still be linked with the overall topic of the text.

== Etymology ==
The term derives from the Latin "excursus". In English, "excursus" refers to an appendix or digression that provides further explanation of a particular point or topic.

== Rhetorical use ==
In rhetoric, an excursus is a form of digression in which a speaker or writer temporarily departs from the principal subject. Classical rhetorical theory recognized digression as a technique that could be inserted between major parts of an argument. In Book IV, Chapter 3 of the Institutio Oratoria, Quintilian discusses the practice of departing from the main argument before proceeding to the proof.

== Excursus in historiography ==
In Greco-Roman historiography, digressions could be used to establish a dialogue between historians and their readers. They could challenge readers' expectations, communicate implicit messages, and encourage connections between seemingly unrelated events, places, or characters. Such passages could therefore contribute to a broader interpretation of history.

In Herodotus's work, a common form of digression is the short narrative excursus, such as an anecdote or brief historical legend inserted into a broader storyline. These digressive narratives can connect with recurring themes in his work and create links between different parts of the main narrative.

== Etymologies as excursuses ==
Sometimes detailed or fanciful etymologies are used as excursuses. This was used as early as the 5th Century BC by the poet Pindar. The most famous case of etymologies being used as excursuses is in the Golden Legend (ca. 1260) of Jacobus de Voragine, in which the life of each saint is proceeded by an etymology about the origin of the saint's name.
