= Fazzi =

Fazzi is an Italian surname. Notable people with the surname include:

- Nicolò Fazzi (born 1995), Italian footballer
- Vito Fazzi (1851–1918), Italian physician
