= Lecce =

Lecce Lècce (Salentino) Luppìu (Griko)
- Comune
- Comune di Lecce
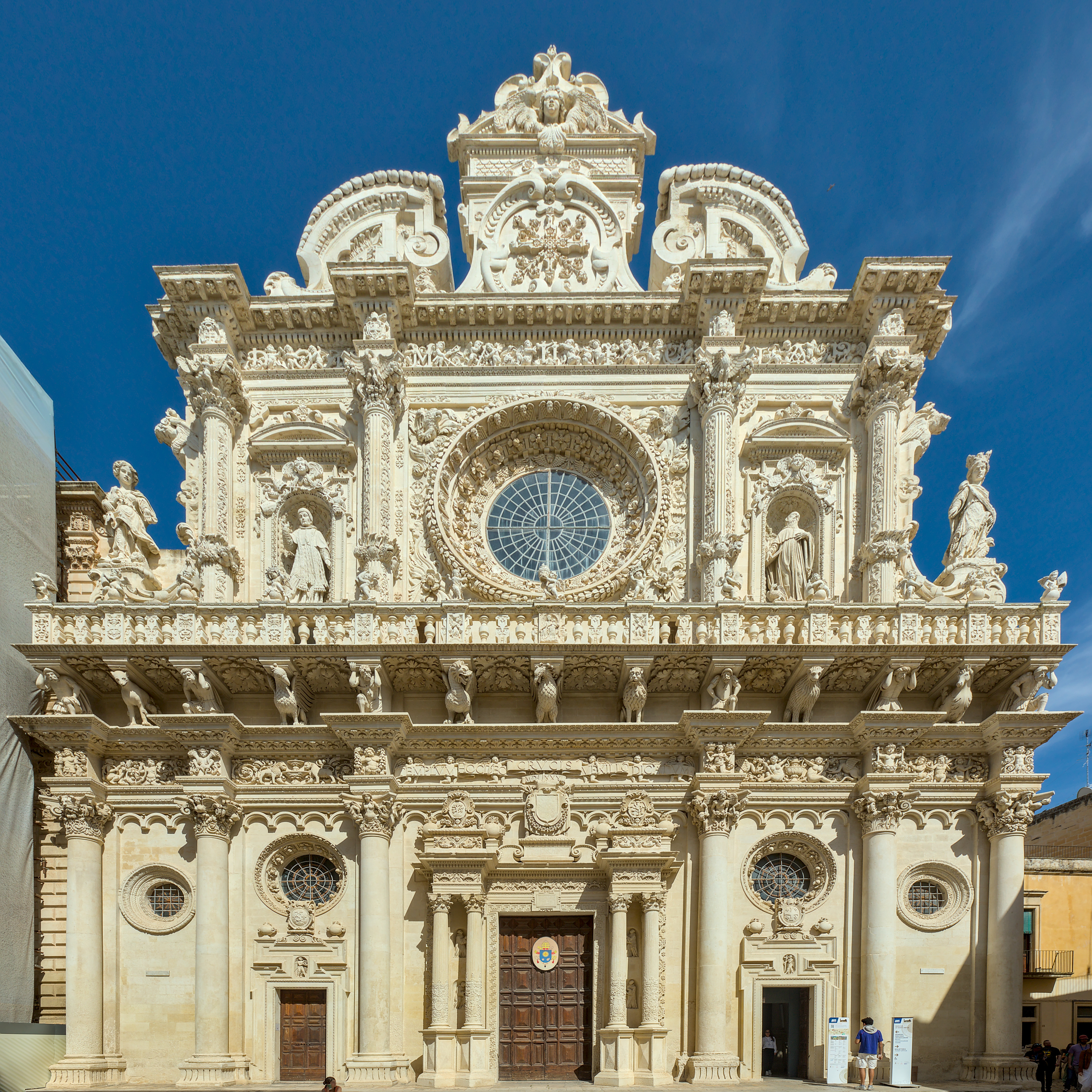
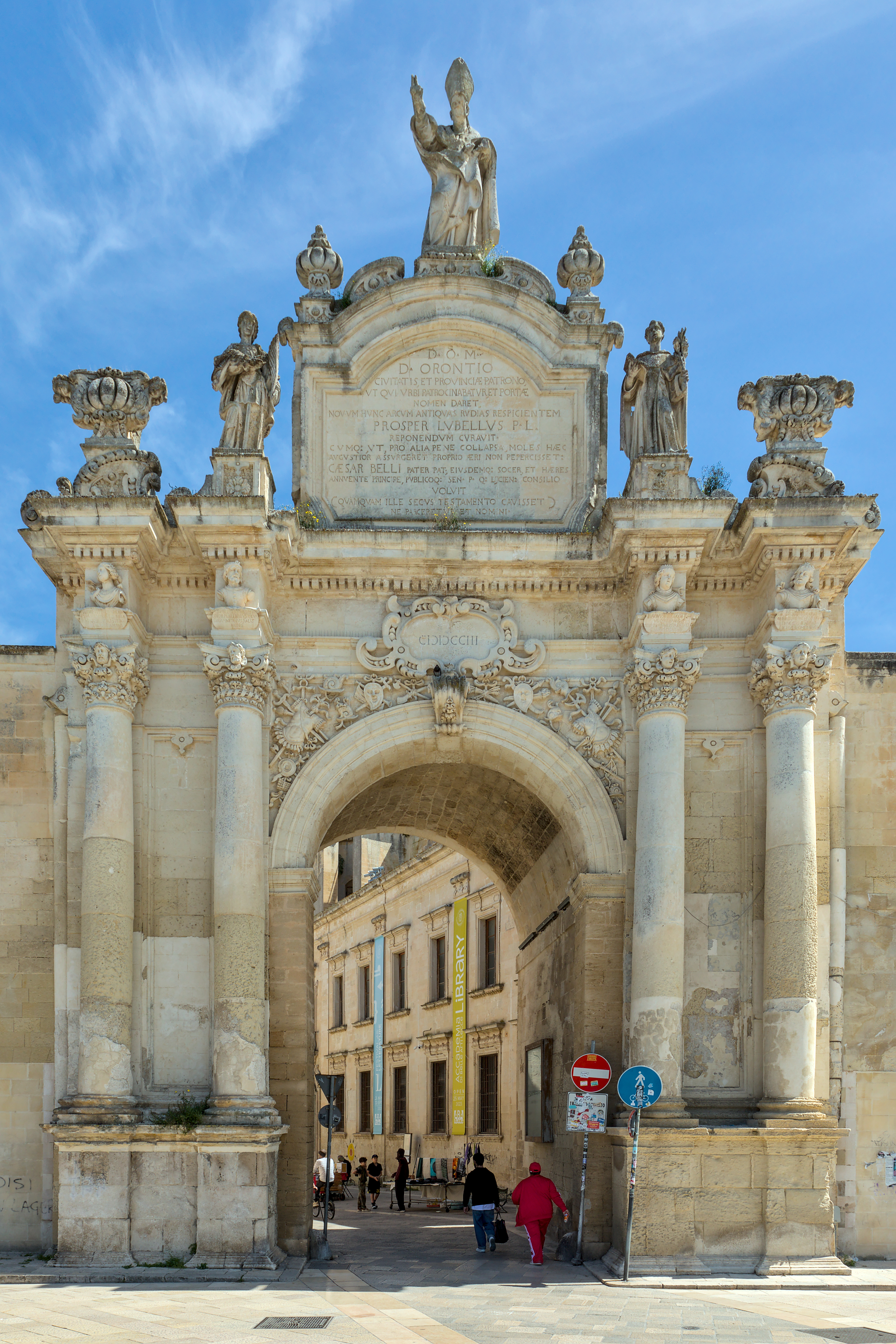
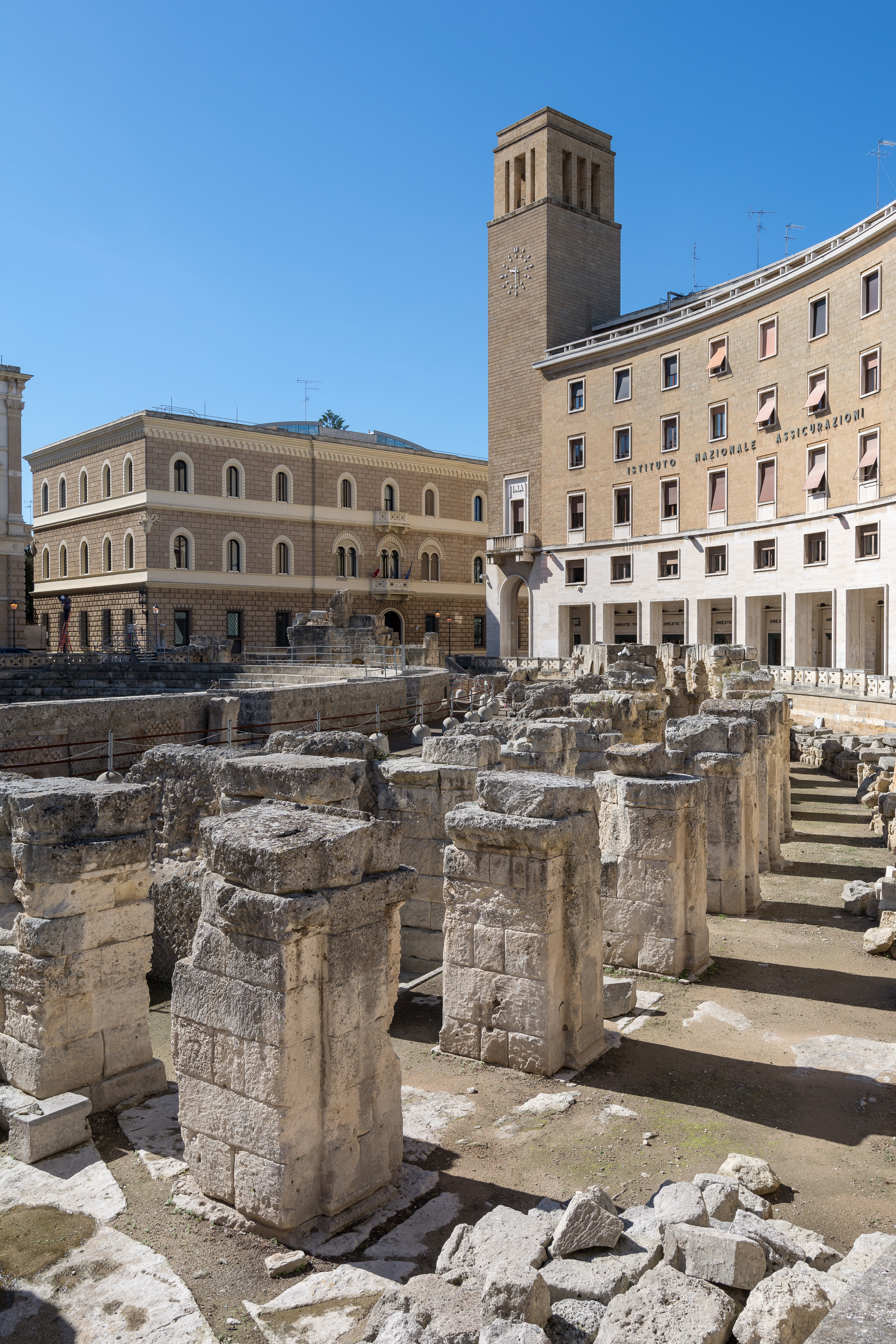
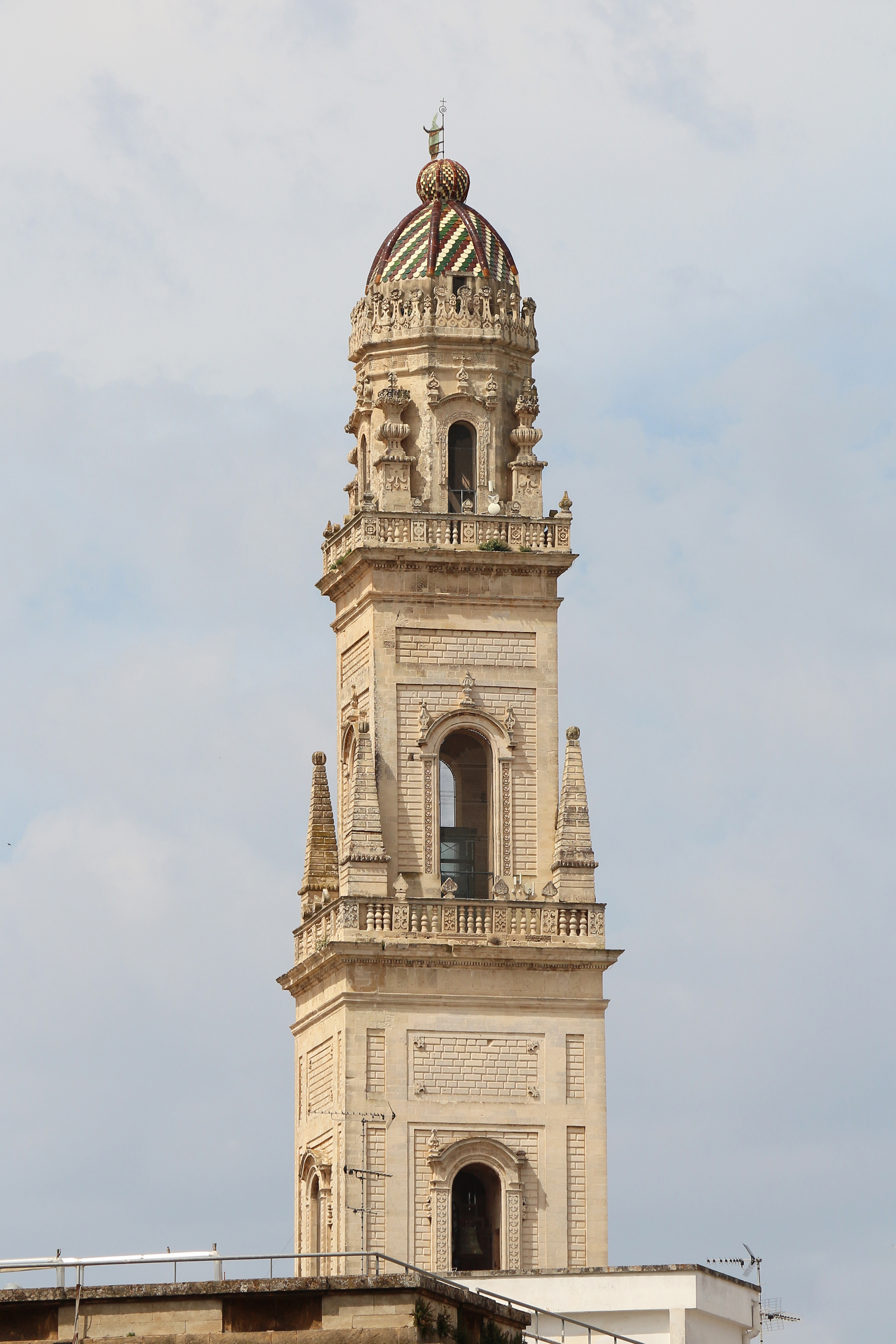
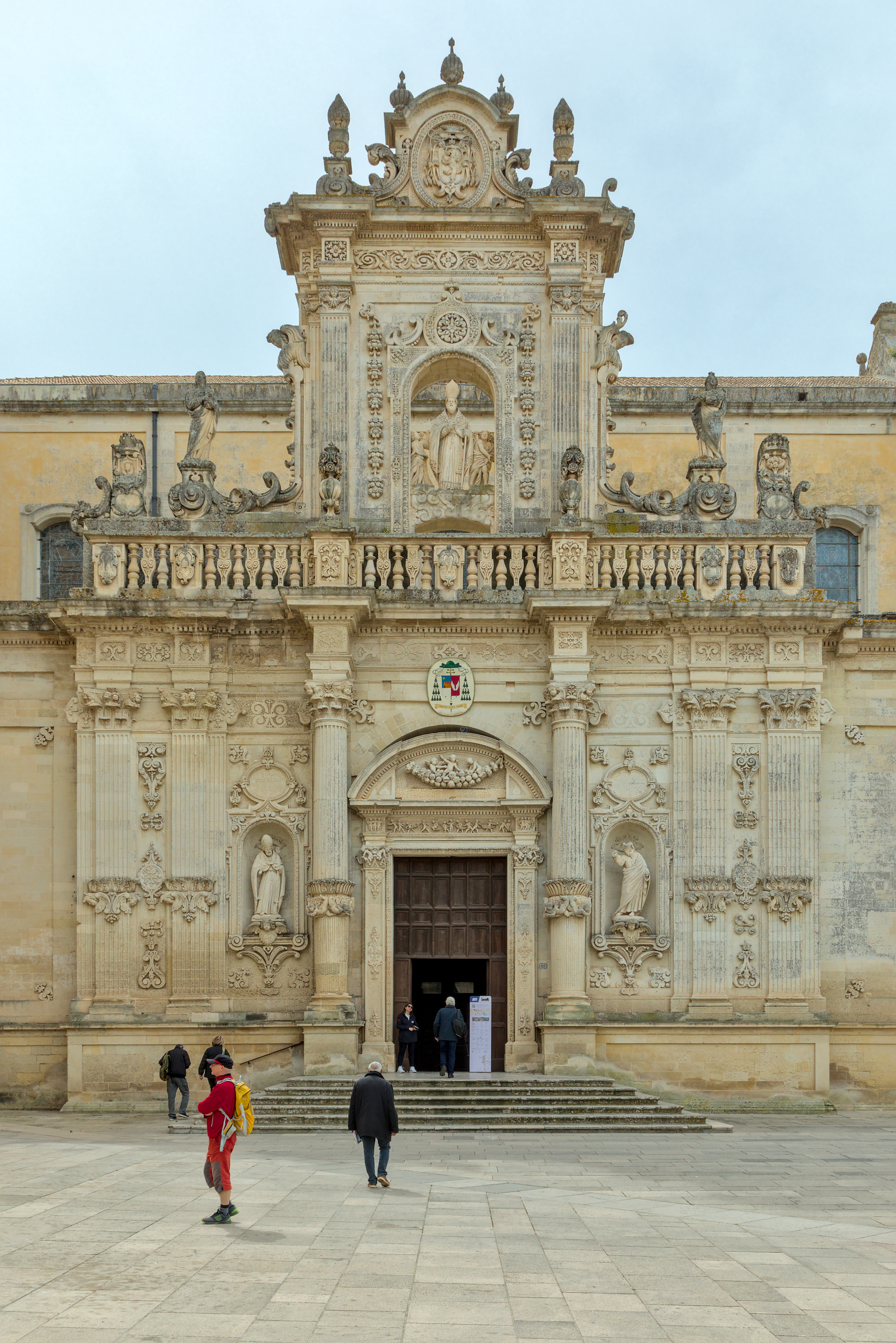
- Clockwise from top: Church of Santa Croce; Roman Amphitheatre; Lecce Cathedral ("Cattedrale di Santa Maria Assunta"); the cathedral's bell tower; and Porta Rudiae

- Flag Coat of arms

- Location within Italy Location within Apulia
- Coordinates: 40°21′N 18°10′E
- Country: Italy
- Region: Apulia
- Province: Lecce
- Founded: 200s BC

Government
  - Mayor: Adriana Poli Bortone

Area
  - Total: 241.00 km^{2} (93.05 sq mi)
- Elevation: 49 m (161 ft)

Population (2026)
  - Total: 94,387
  - Density: 391.65/km^{2} (1,014.4/sq mi)
- Demonym: Leccese
- Time zone: UTC+1 (CET)
  - Summer (DST): UTC+2 (CEST)
- Postal code: 73100
- Dialing code: 0832
- ISTAT code: 075035
- Patron saint: Orontius
- Website: www.comune.lecce.it

Lecce (/ˈlɛtʃeɪ/ LETCH-ay; Italian: [ˈlettʃe]) (Note: Salentino: Lècce; Griko: Luppìu; Latin: Lupiae; Ancient Greek: Λουπίαι, romanized: Loupíai) is a city and comune (municipality) in the region of Apulia in southern Italy, and the capital of the province of Lecce. It is on the Salentine Peninsula, at the heel of the Italian Peninsula. With a population of 94,387, it is also the largest city in the province.

Because of its rich Baroque architecture, Lecce is nicknamed "The Florence of the South". "Lecce stone", a particular kind of limestone, is one of the main exports of the city. It is very soft and workable, thus suitable for sculptures. As well as being an industrial centre specializing in ceramics, Lecce is also an important agricultural centre, chiefly for its olive oil and wine production.

Lecce is home to the University of Salento.

== History ==
According to legends about Lecce, a city called Sybar founded by the Messapians at the time of the Trojan War was conquered by the Romans in the third century BC, receiving the new name of Lupiae. Under the Roman emperor Hadrian (second century AD) Lupiae was renamed as Licea or Litium and moved 3 kilometres (2 miles) to the northeast. The ancient city had a theater and an amphitheater and was connected to the Hadrian Port (the current San Cataldo).

Orontius of Lecce, locally called Sant'Oronzo, is considered to have served as the city's first Christian bishop and he is the patron saint of Lecce.

After the fall of the Western Roman Empire, Lecce was sacked by the Ostrogoth king, Totila, during the Gothic Wars. Roman rule was restored in 549 and it remained part of the Eastern Roman Empire for five centuries, with brief conquests by Ottomans and Lombards.

After the Norman conquest in the eleventh century, Lecce regained commercial and political importance. Count Tancred of Lecce was the last Norman king of Sicily. Lecce flourished in the subsequent Hohenstaufen and Angevine rule. When it was annexed directly to the crown, from 1053 to 1463, Lecce was one of the largest and most important fiefs in the Kingdom of Sicily.

From the fifteenth century, Lecce was one of the most important cities of southern Italy and, starting in 1630, it was enriched with precious Baroque monuments. To avert invasion by the Ottomans, during the first part of the sixteenth century a new line of walls and a castle were built by Charles V (who also was the Holy Roman Emperor).

In 1656, a plague broke out in the city, killing a thousand inhabitants.

In 1943, during World War II fighter aircraft based in Lecce helped support isolated Italian garrisons in the Aegean Sea. Because they were delayed by the Allies, they couldn't prevent a defeat. In 1944 and 1945, B-24 long-range bombers of the 98th Heavy Bomber Group attached to the 15th U.S. Army Air Force were based in Lecce, from where the crews flew missions over Italy, the Balkans, Austria, Germany, and France.

== Climate ==
Lecce experiences a Mediterranean climate (Köppen climate classification Csa).

Climate data for Lecce (1981–2010)
Month	Jan	Feb	Mar	Apr	May	Jun	Jul	Aug	Sep	Oct	Nov	Dec	Year
Record high °C (°F)	21.2 (70.2)	22.4 (72.3)	28.6 (83.5)	30.4 (86.7)	35.6 (96.1)	44.0 (111.2)	44.4 (111.9)	42.6 (108.7)	40.6 (105.1)	34.2 (93.6)	26.8 (80.2)	21.4 (70.5)	44.4 (111.9)
Mean daily maximum °C (°F)	13.1 (55.6)	13.4 (56.1)	15.9 (60.6)	19.3 (66.7)	24.9 (76.8)	29.5 (85.1)	32.3 (90.1)	32.2 (90.0)	27.7 (81.9)	22.8 (73.0)	17.8 (64.0)	14.1 (57.4)	21.9 (71.4)
Daily mean °C (°F)	8.4 (47.1)	8.5 (47.3)	10.6 (51.1)	13.7 (56.7)	18.5 (65.3)	22.7 (72.9)	25.5 (77.9)	25.6 (78.1)	21.8 (71.2)	17.7 (63.9)	13.1 (55.6)	9.7 (49.5)	16.3 (61.4)
Mean daily minimum °C (°F)	3.8 (38.8)	3.6 (38.5)	5.3 (41.5)	8.0 (46.4)	12.0 (53.6)	16.0 (60.8)	18.7 (65.7)	19.0 (66.2)	15.9 (60.6)	12.6 (54.7)	8.3 (46.9)	5.2 (41.4)	10.7 (51.3)
Record low °C (°F)	−12.0 (10.4)	−5.6 (21.9)	−4.6 (23.7)	−1.8 (28.8)	3.2 (37.8)	7.4 (45.3)	10.4 (50.7)	10.8 (51.4)	6.0 (42.8)	1.1 (34.0)	−2.8 (27.0)	−5.4 (22.3)	−12.0 (10.4)
Average precipitation mm (inches)	60.3 (2.37)	61.3 (2.41)	62.4 (2.46)	45.5 (1.79)	27.6 (1.09)	20.4 (0.80)	16.2 (0.64)	36.0 (1.42)	54.3 (2.14)	91.0 (3.58)	95.1 (3.74)	68.9 (2.71)	639 (25.15)
Average precipitation days (≥ 1.0 mm)	7.9	6.9	6.9	6.2	4.4	3.0	1.9	2.2	4.8	6.3	7.8	7.8	66.1
Average relative humidity (%)	78.3	75.6	73.9	72.7	69.2	66.3	65.2	66.7	72.4	77.1	80.0	79.5	73.1
Average dew point °C (°F)	5.8 (42.4)	5.7 (42.3)	7.1 (44.8)	9.7 (49.5)	12.5 (54.5)	15.5 (59.9)	17.4 (63.3)	18.8 (65.8)	17.1 (62.8)	14.6 (58.3)	11.2 (52.2)	7.2 (45.0)	11.9 (53.4)
Source 1: Istituto Superiore per la Protezione e la Ricerca Ambientale
Source 2: NCEI(Precipitation days-Humidity-Dew Point 1991–2020), World Meteorological Organization (precipitation) altervista (extremes)

== Demographics ==
As of 2026, the population is 94,387, of which 47.8% are male, and 52.2% are female. Minors make up 13.6% of the population, and seniors make up 26.3%.

Historical population

Year	Pop.	±%
1861	15,594	—
1871	23,301	+49.4%
1881	25,441	+9.2%
1901	32,029	+25.9%
1911	34,958	+9.1%
1921	39,556	+13.2%
1931	44,368	+12.2%
1936	49,261	+11.0%

Year	Pop.	±%
1951	63,831	+29.6%
1961	75,297	+18.0%
1971	83,050	+10.3%
1981	91,289	+9.9%
1991	100,884	+10.5%
2001	83,303	−17.4%
2011	89,916	+7.9%
2021	94,783	+5.4%

Source: ISTAT

=== Immigration ===
As of 2025, of the known countries of birth of 92,504 residents, the most numerous are: Italy (84,337 – 91.2%), Albania (814 – 0.9%), India (733 – 0.8%), Senegal (723 – 0.8%), Philippines (634 – 0.7%), Romania (510 – 0.6%).

== Main sights ==
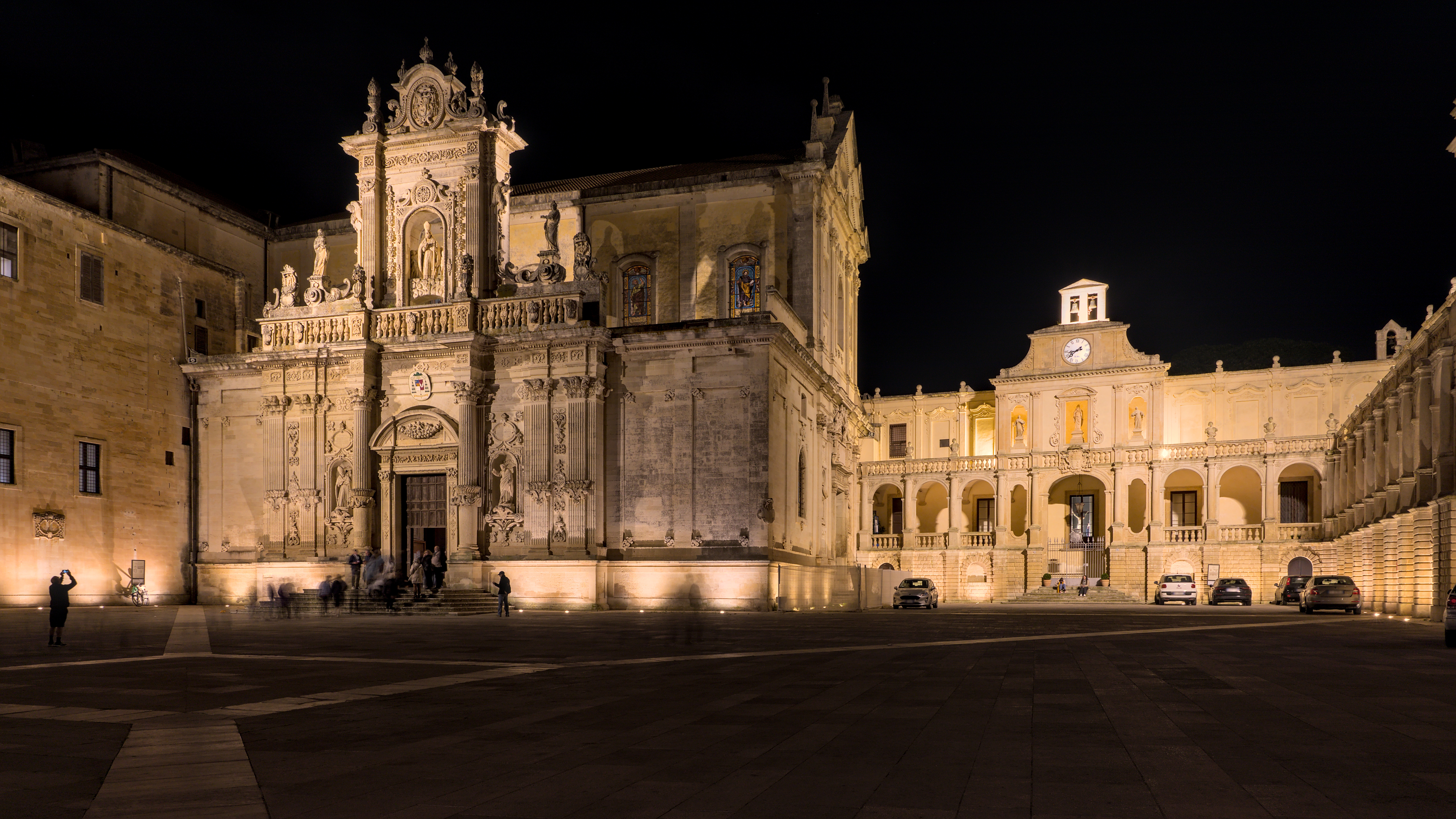
Piazza del Duomo at night

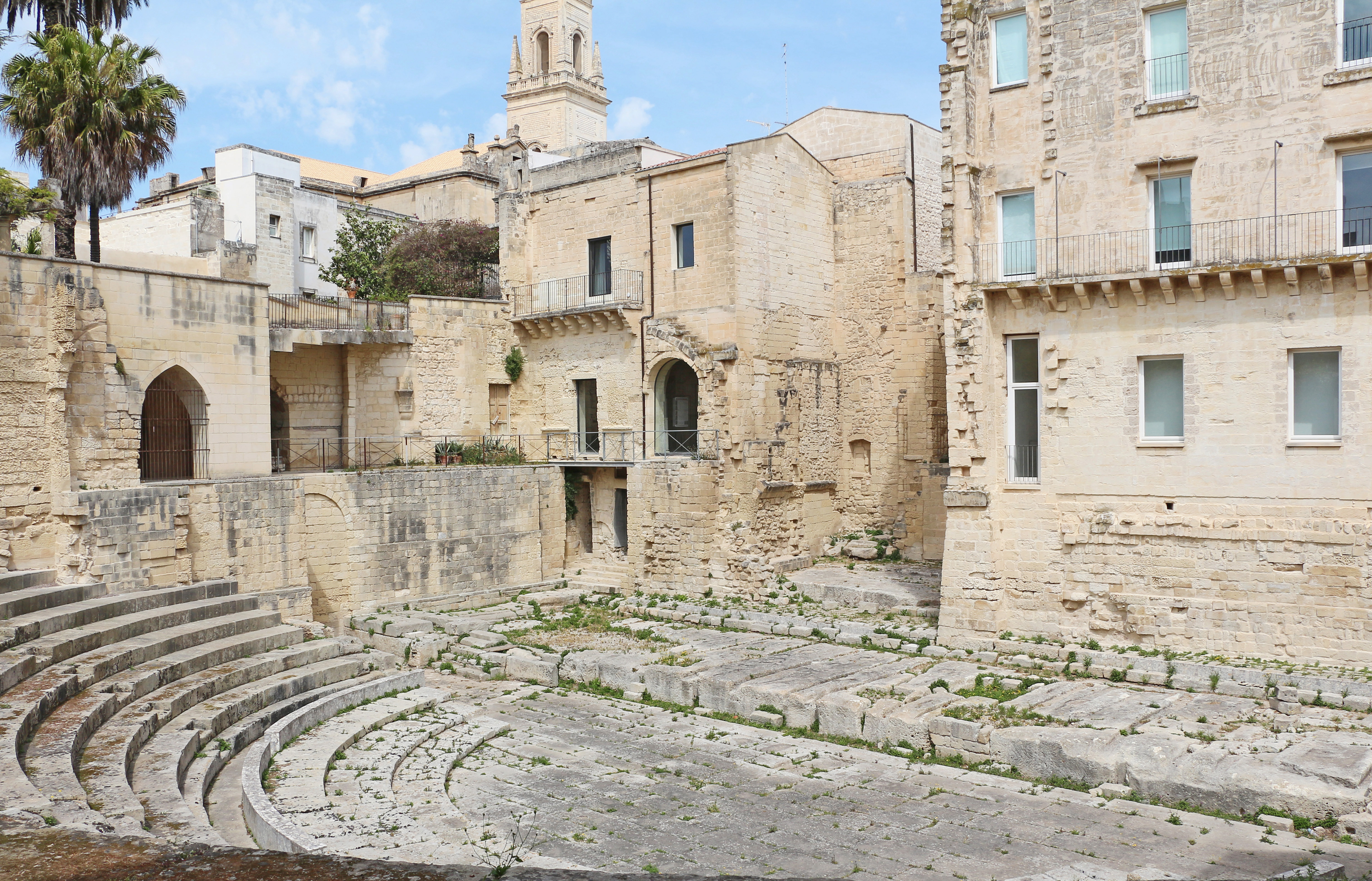
The Roman theater

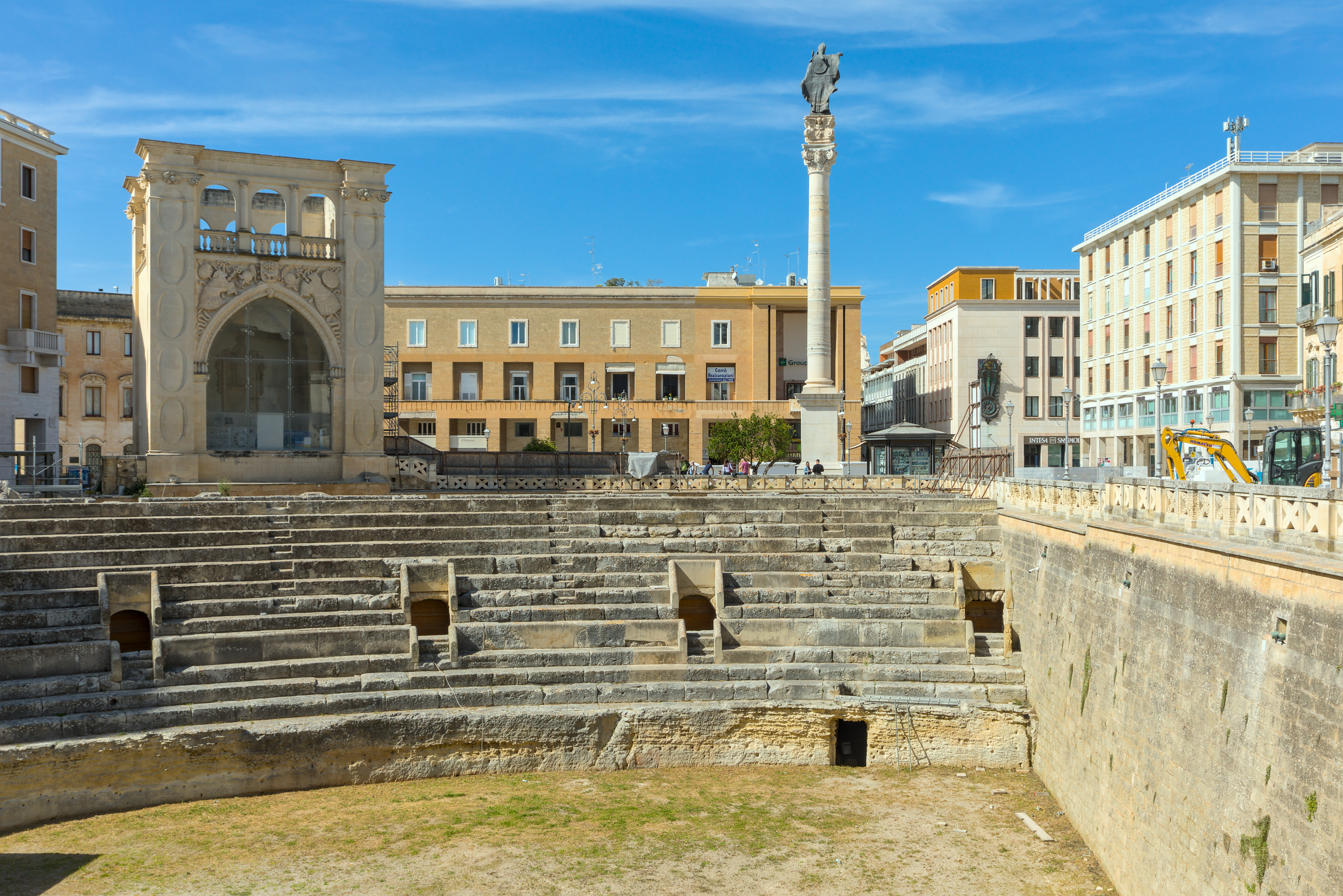
Roman amphitheater, palazzo Sedile and column of St. Oronzo

=== Churches and religious buildings ===
- Church of the Holy Cross: construction of the Chiesa di Santa Croce) was begun in 1353, but work halted until 1549. It was not completed until 1695. The church has a richly decorated façade with animals, grotesque figures and vegetables, and a large rose window. Next to the church is the Government Palace, a former convent.
- Lecce Cathedral: the church was originally built in 1144, rebuilt in 1230, then totally restored in the 1659–70 by Giuseppe Zimbalo, who also built the five-story 70-metre (230 ft) high bell tower, with an octagonal loggia.
- San Niccolò and Cataldo: the church is an example of Italo-Norman architecture. It was founded by Tancred of Sicily in 1180. In 1716, the façade was rebuilt, with the addition of numerous statues, but maintaining the original Romanesque portal. The walls were frescoed during the fifteenth-seventeenth centuries.
- Celestine Convent: built (1549–1695) in Baroque-style by Giuseppe Zimbalo. The courtyard was designed by Gabriele Riccardi.
- Santa Irene: this church was commissioned in 1591 by the Theatines and dedicated to Saint Irene. The architect was Francesco Grimaldi. It has a large façade displaying different styles in the upper and lower parts. Above the portal stands a statue of Ste Irene (1717) by Mauro Manieri. The interior is on the Latin cross plan and is rather sober. The main altarpiece is a copy of the St. Michael the Archangel by Guido Reni. The high altar has a Transport of the Holy Ark by Oronzo Tiso. In the right transept is one of the largest altars in Lecce, dedicated to Saint Cajetan (1651). Nearby is the Rococo altar of Saint Andrew Avellino. Also from the mid-17th century is the Altar of St. Orontius by Francesco Antonio Zimbalo, followed by the altar of Saint Irene with a canvas by Giuseppe Verrio (1639), nine busts of saints housing relics, and a large statue of the saint. The altar of Saint Stephen has the Stoning of St. Stephen by Verrio.
- San Matteo: this church was built in 1667. It has a typical central Italy Baroque style. It has two columns on the façade, only one of which is decorated, although only partially. According to a local legend, the jealous devil killed the sculptor before he could finish the work.
- Santa Maria degli Angeli
- Santa Chiara: this church was built in 1429–1438, rebuilt in 1687.
- San Francesco della Scarpa: known as the "church without façade" as its façade was demolished during nineteenth century restorations. The most ancient section likely dates to the thirteenth-fourteenth centuries; the interior is designed on the Greek Cross plan. Notable are several Baroque altars and a large statue of Saint Joseph.

=== Other buildings ===
- Column of statue of St. Oronzo: (Lecce's patron) was given to Lecce by the city of Brindisi, because Saint Oronzo was reputed to have cured the plague in Brindisi. The column was one of a pair that marked the end of the Appian Way, the main road between Rome and southern Italy.
- Torre del Parco ("Park Tower"): is one of the medieval symbols of Lecce. It was erected in 1419 by the then 18-year-old Giovanni Antonio Orsini del Balzo, prince of Lecce. The tower, standing at more than 23 metres (75 ft), is surrounded by a pit in which bears (the heraldic symbol of the Orsini del Balzo) were reared. The whole complex was the seat of Orsini's tribunal and of a mint, and after Giovanni Antonio's death, it became a residence for the Spanish viceroys.
- Palazzo Sedile: was built in 1592 and was used by the local council until 1852.
- Castle of Charles V: built in 1539–49 by Gian Giacomo dell'Acaja. It has a trapezoidal plan with angular bastions. It is attached to the Politeama Greco Opera House, inaugurated on 15 November 1884.
- Triumphal Arch (Arco di Trionfo, commonly called Porta Napoli, "Neapolitan Gate"), which is one of the three gates to enter Lecce's historical city centre, erected in 1548 in honor of Charles V. It replaced an older gate, Porta S. Giusto, which, according to tradition, lay over the tomb of the namesake saint. Also built over pre-existing medieval gates are the current Porta San Biagio ("St. Blaise Gate") and the Porta Rudiae that are the other two gates to Lecce's Historical city centre. Both are in Baroque style, the latter having the statue of St. Oronzo on the top and mythological figures on the sides.
- Palazzo dei Celestini: now seat of the Province of Lecce. It was built in 1659–95 and designed by Giuseppe Zimbalo.
- The city's obelisk: erected in 1822 in honour of Ferdinand I of the Two Sicilies
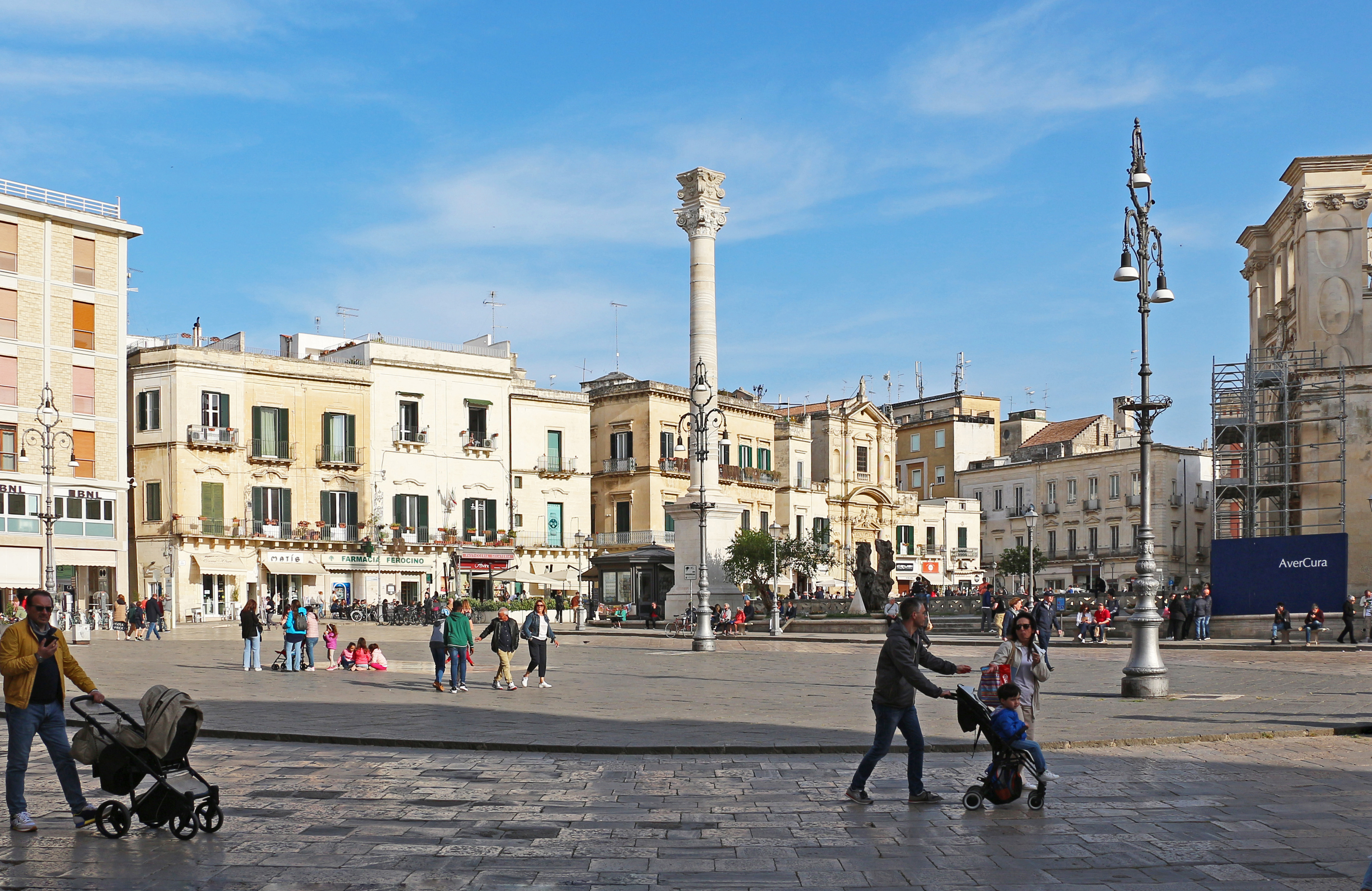
Piazza Sant'Oronzo

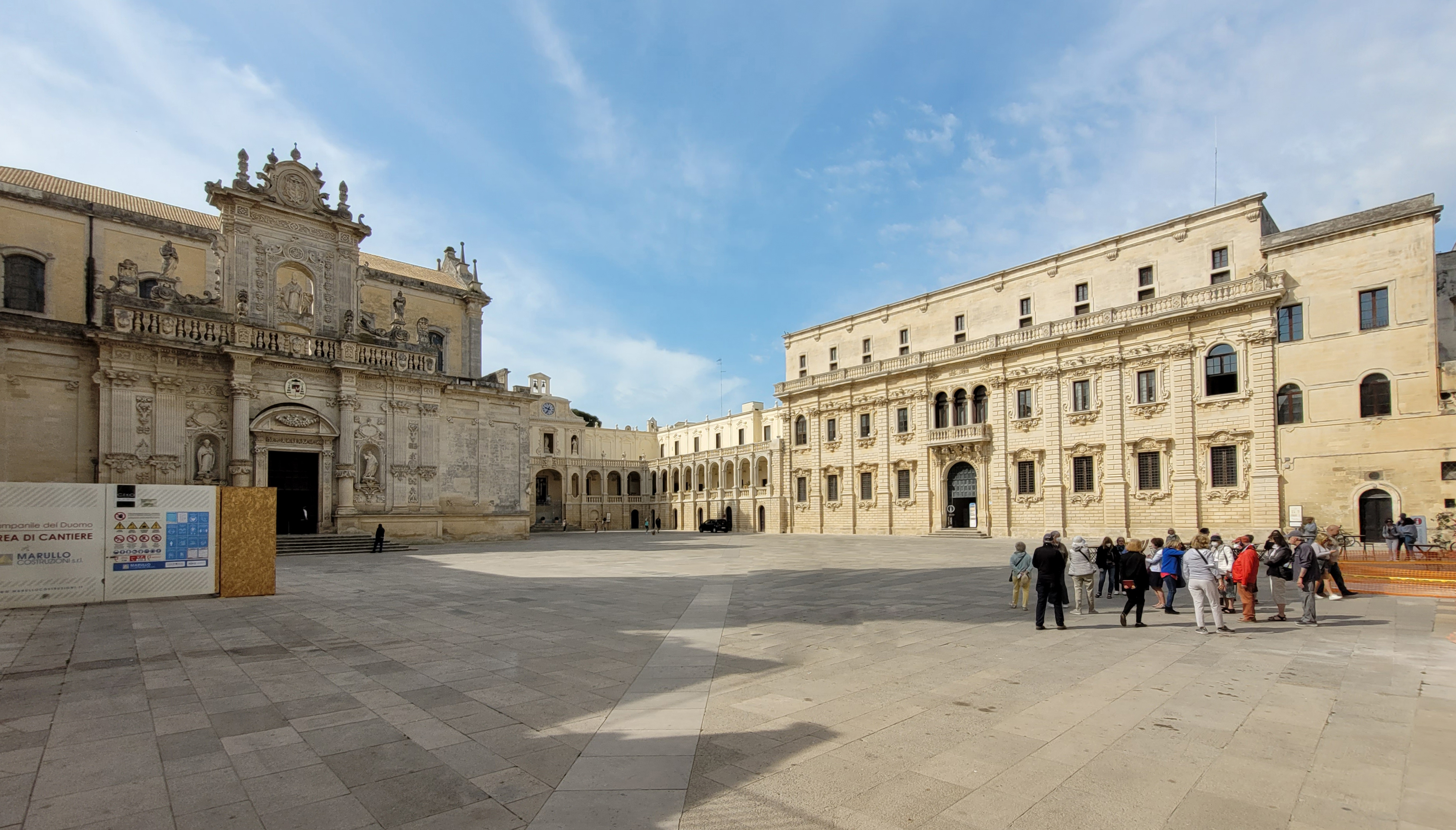
Piazza del Duomo

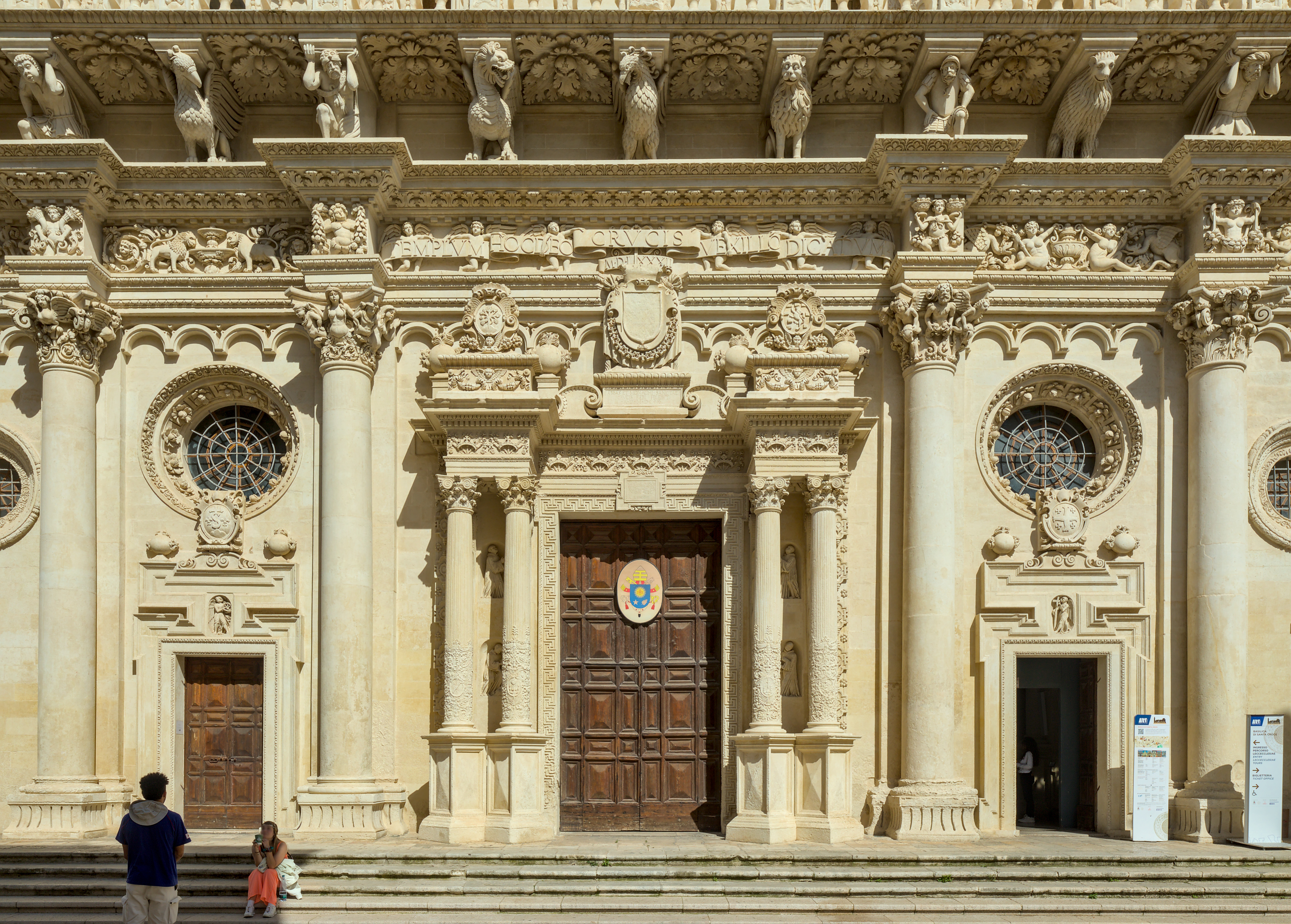
Lower part of the facade of Basilica di Santa Croce

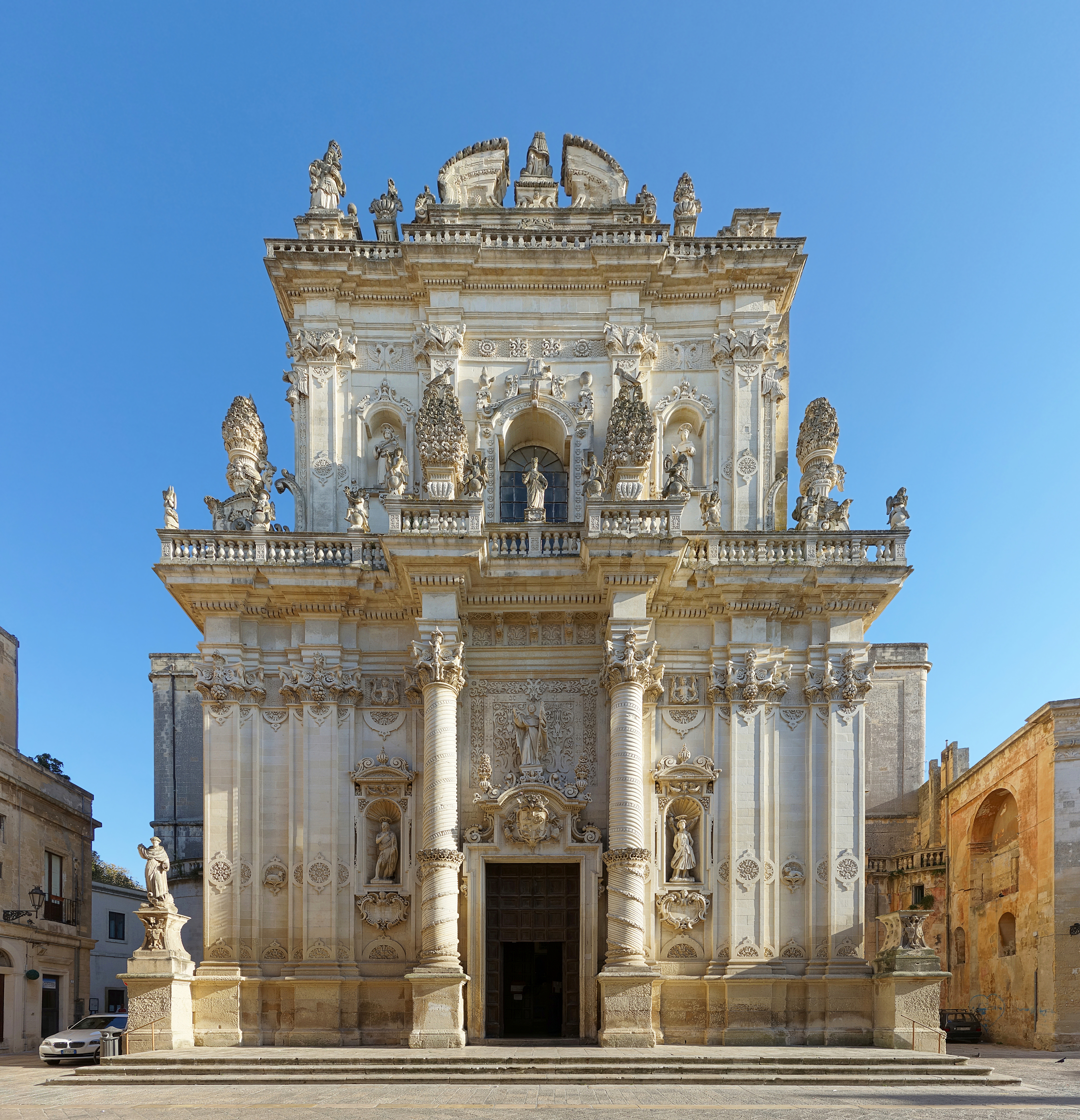
Church of San Giovanni Battista

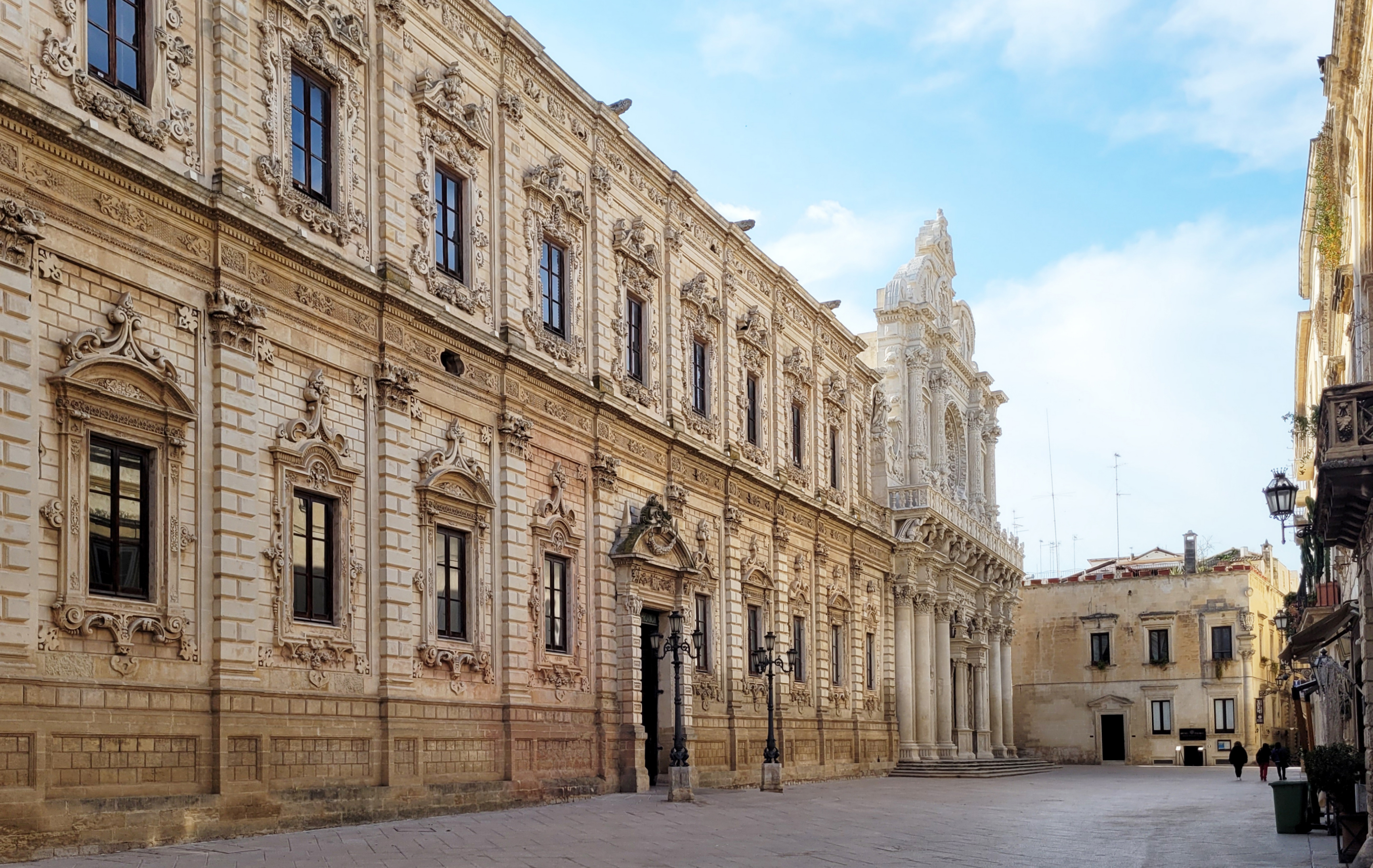
Palazzo dei Celestini

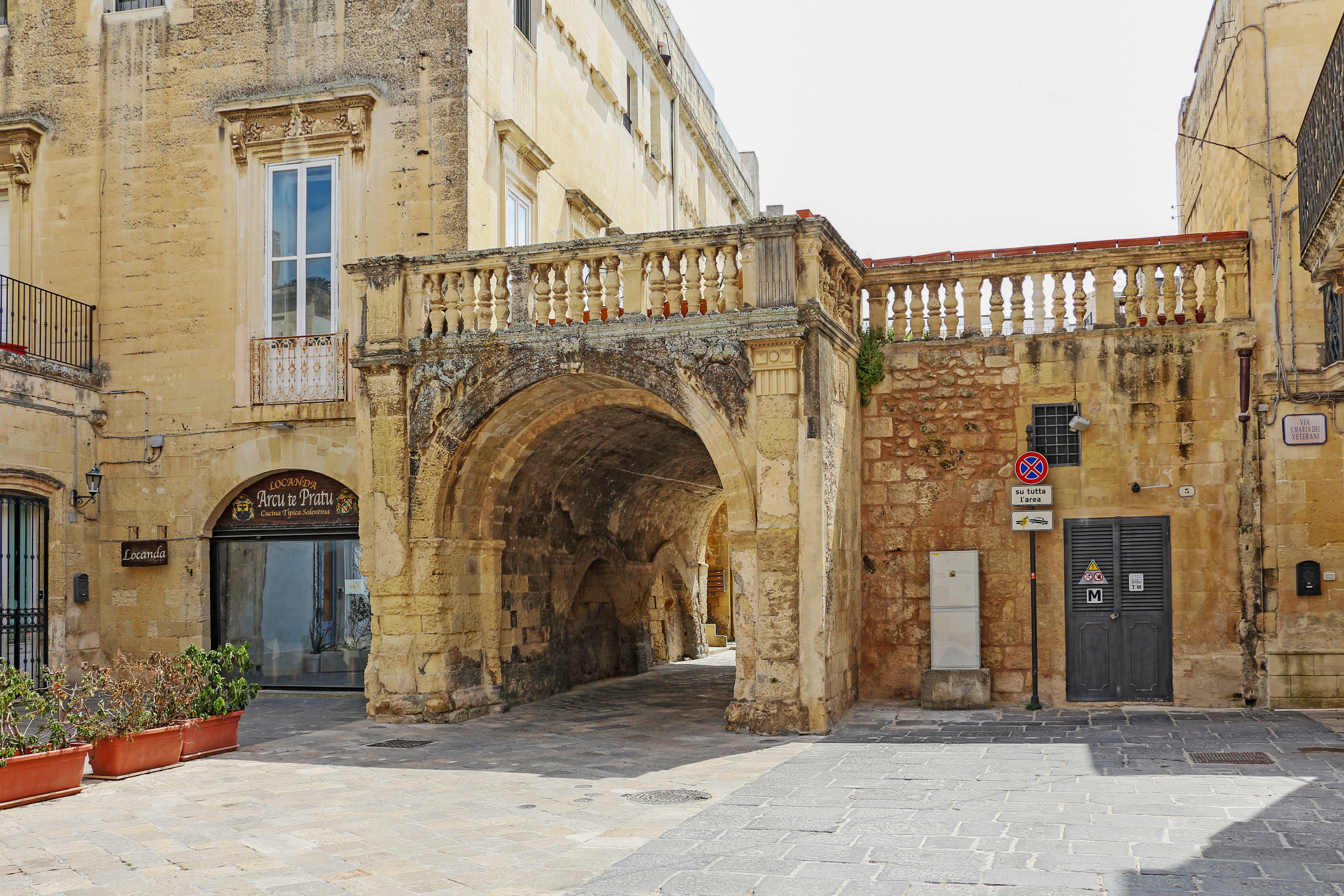
Arco di Prato

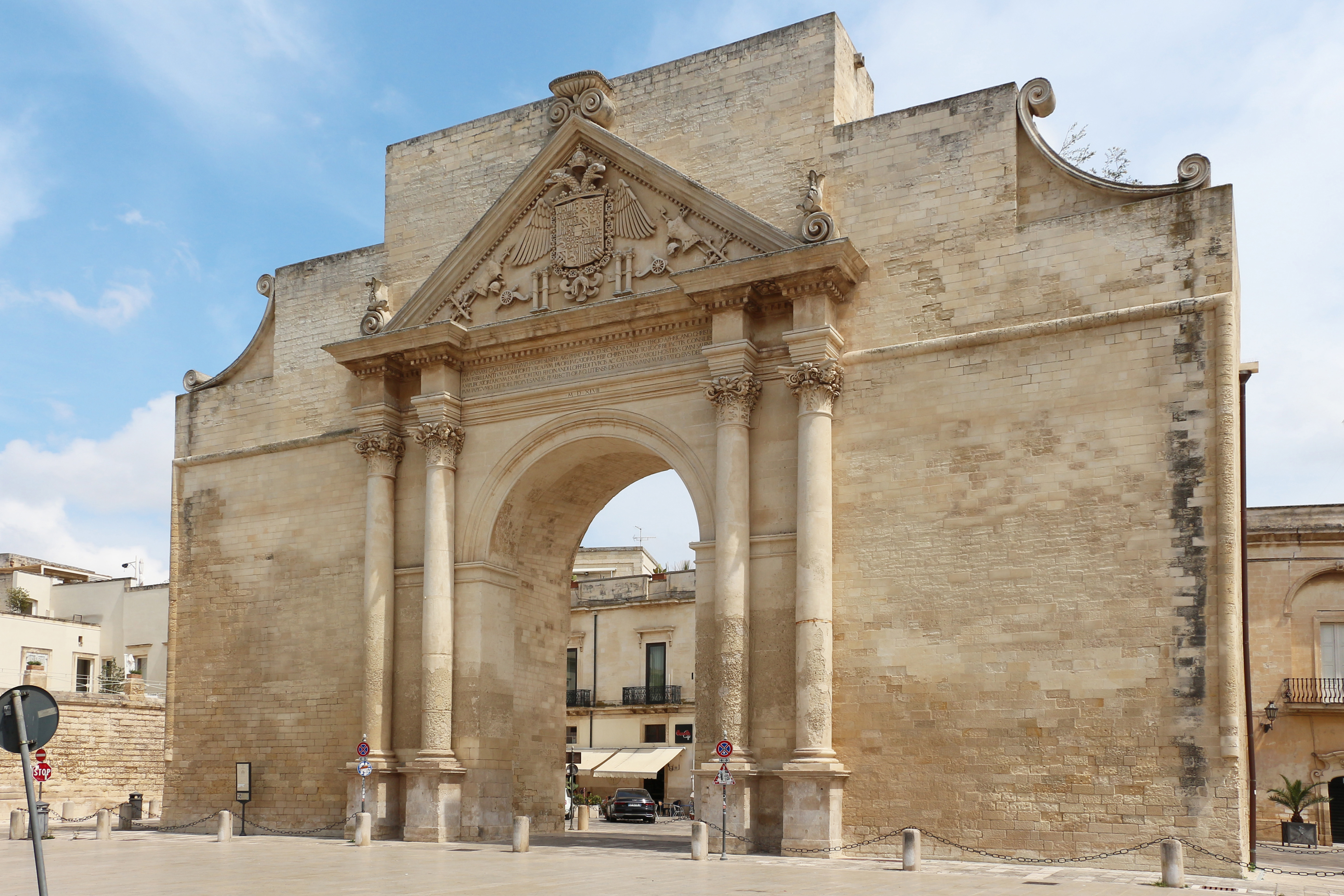
Porta Napoli

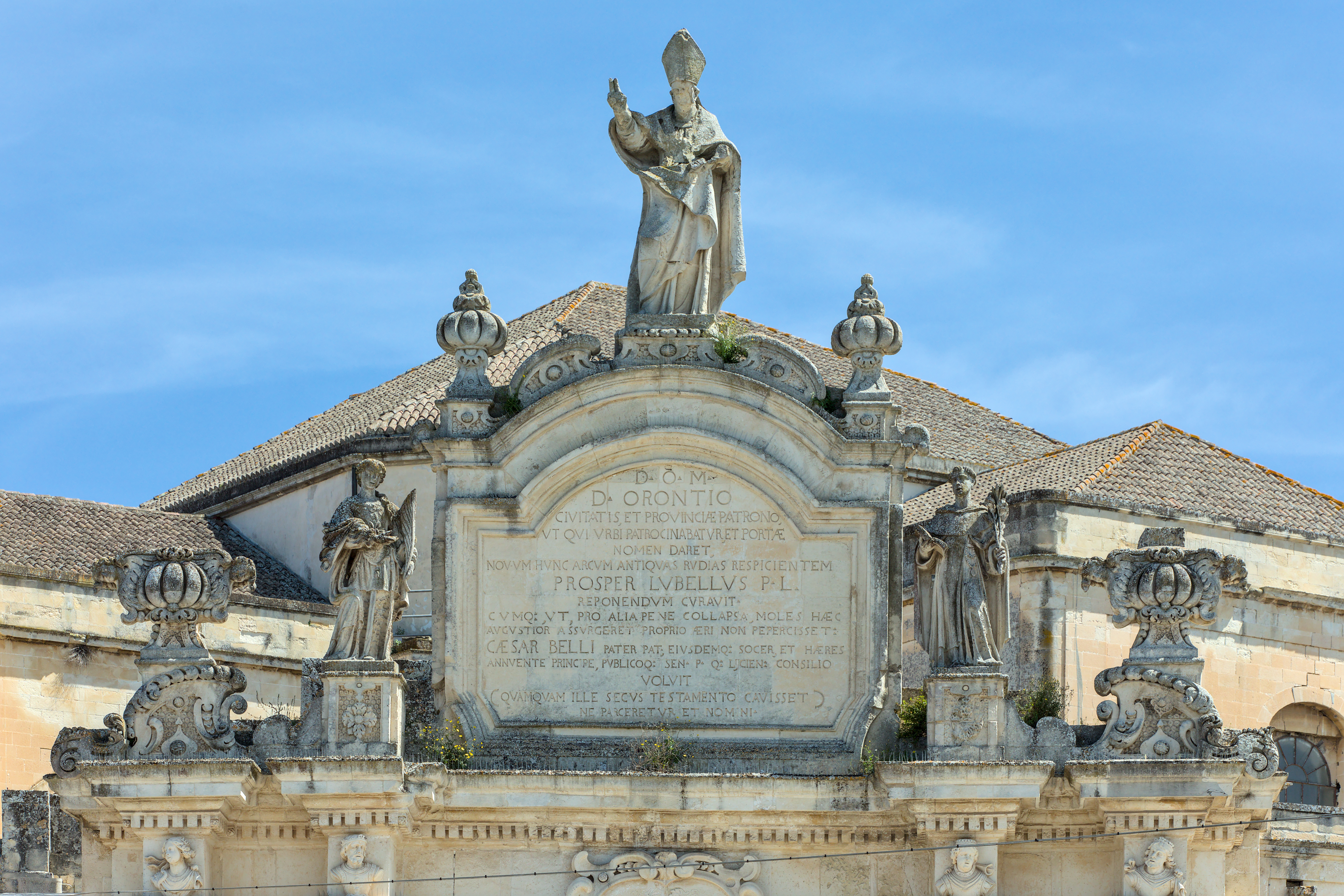
Pediment of Porta Rudiae

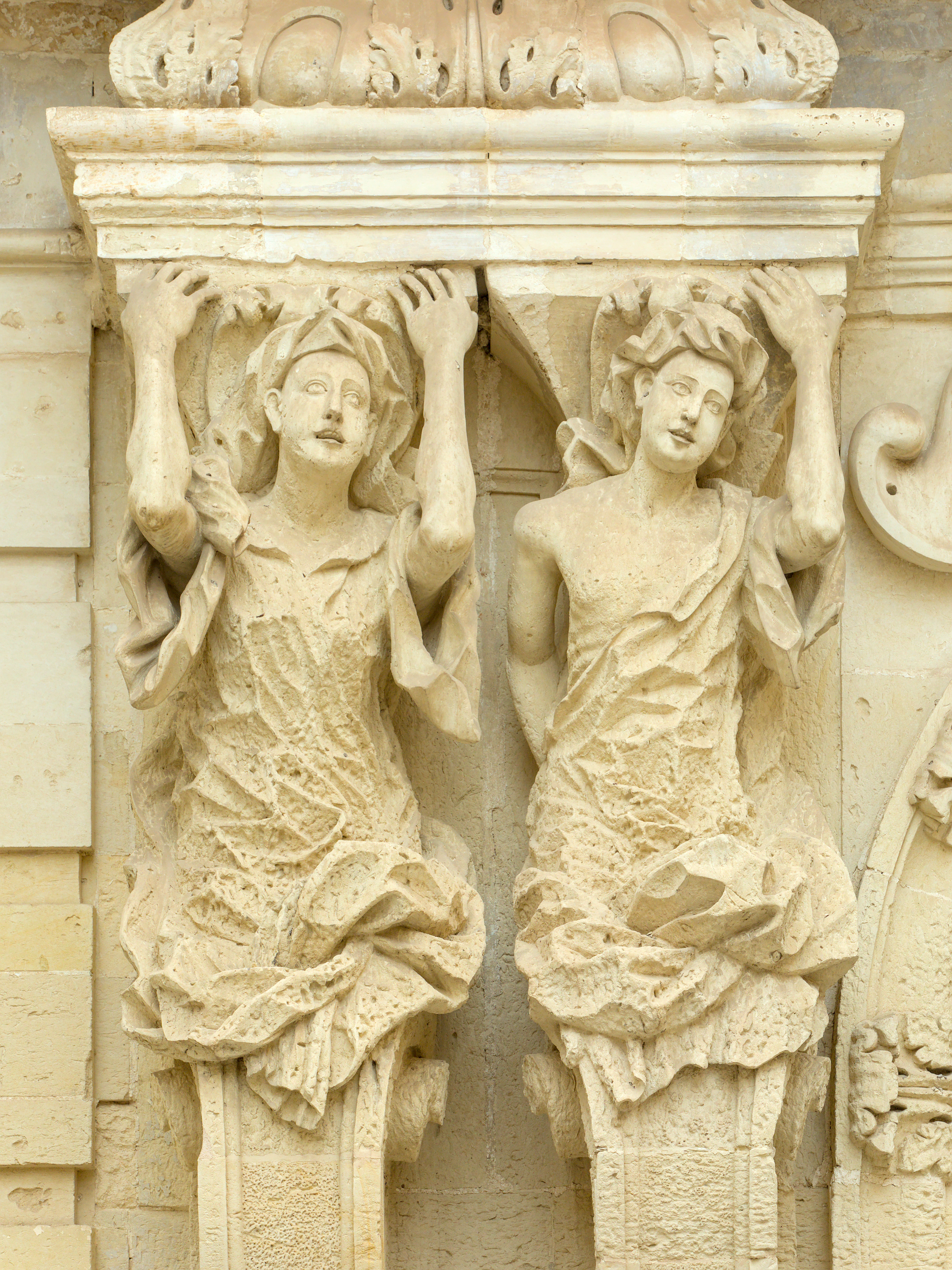
Caryatids on the facade of palazzo Marrese

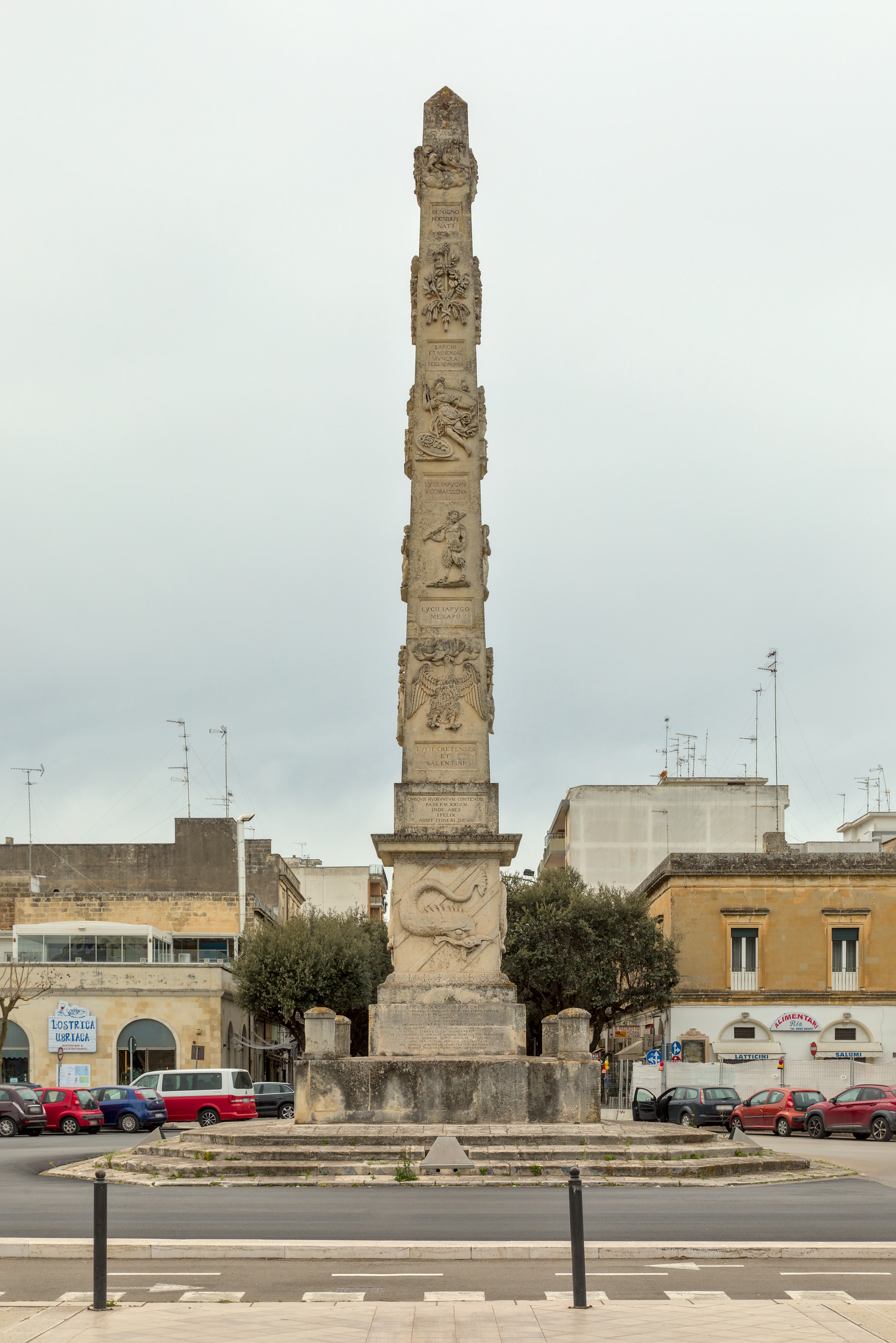
Ferdinando I di Borbone Obelisk

=== Gardens and parks ===
- Orto Botanico di Lecce, a botanical garden.

=== Archaeology ===
- The Roman second century amphitheatre, situated near Sant'Oronzo Square, was able to seat more than 25,000 people. It is now half-buried because over the following centuries other monuments were built above it. The theatre is currently used for various religious and arts events.
- The archaeological museum Sigismondo Castromediano
- The archaeological museum Faggiano
- The archaeological park of Rudiae, three kilometres to the south-west but within its city limits. The place was identified as the former home of the poet Ennius by Antonio de Ferraris, a Renaissance Humanist who was from the region. This was once the more important city until Roman times and has an amphitheatre of its own, a necropolis, and remains of substantial walls. The Porta Rudiae, built on the road leading from this site, is named after it.
  Roman ampitheater

== Sport ==
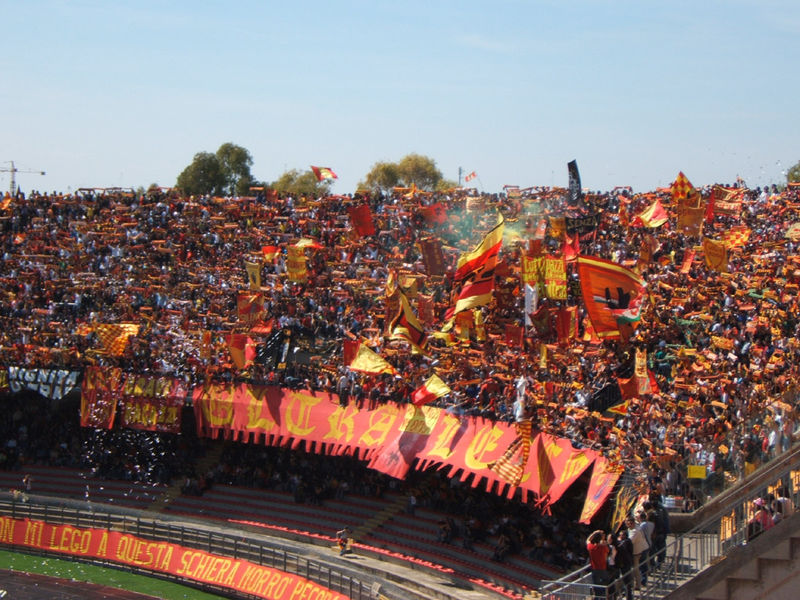
US Lecce crowd at the Stadio Via del Mare

Lecce is home to Serie A football club US Lecce, founded in 1908. Since 1966, they have played at the 33,786-seater Stadio Via del Mare.

== Transport ==
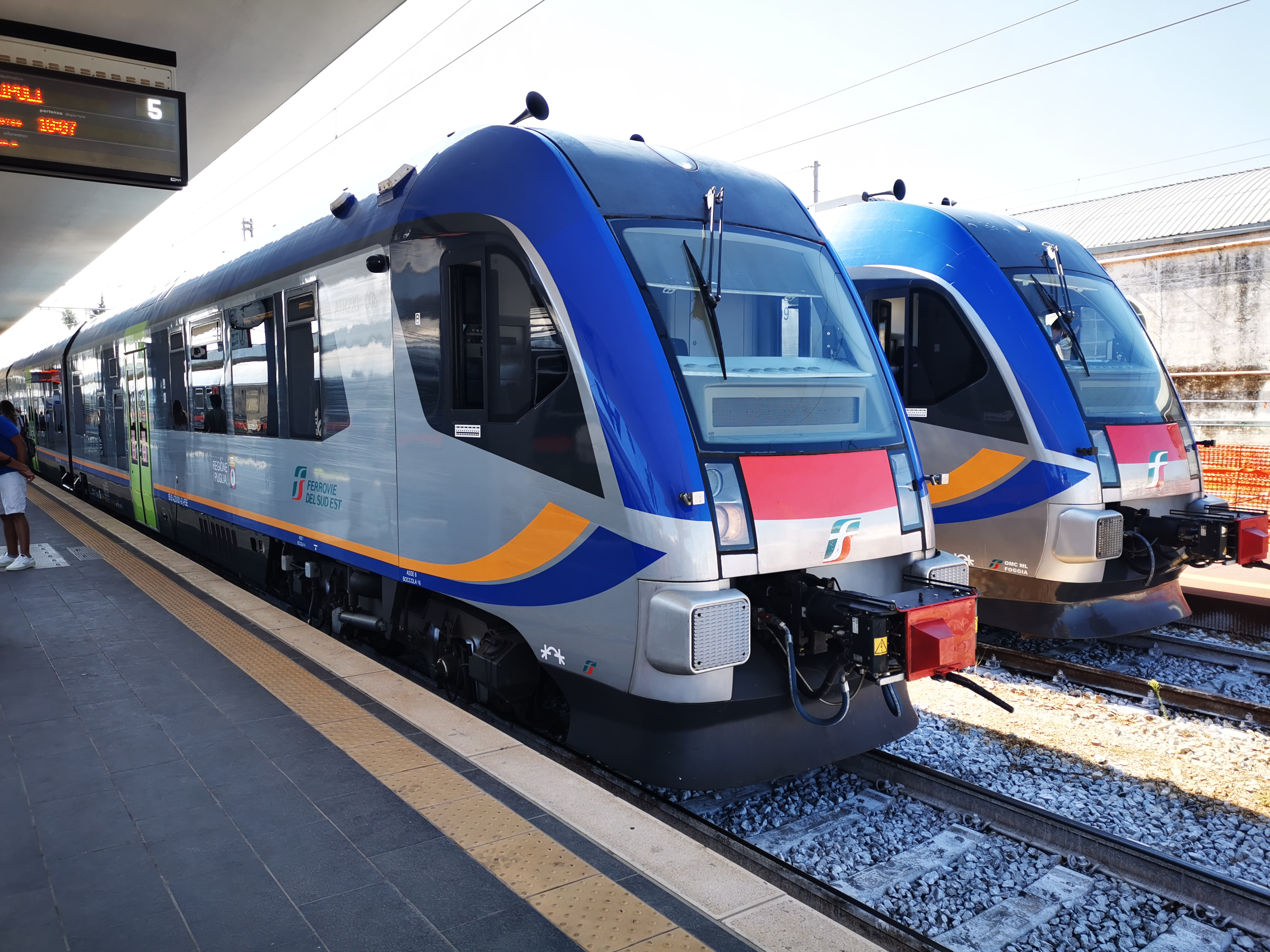
Two Ferrovie del Sud Est trains at Lecce railway station

Lecce is served by Lecce railway station, which is the southern terminus of the Adriatic railway (Ancona–Lecce) and also the terminus of two regional lines, the Martina Franca–Lecce railway and the Lecce–Otranto railway. The local public transport includes trolleybus service, introduced in 2012. Air transportation is provided at Brindisi Airport, the closest airport, which is about 39 km (24 miles) away.

== Notable people ==
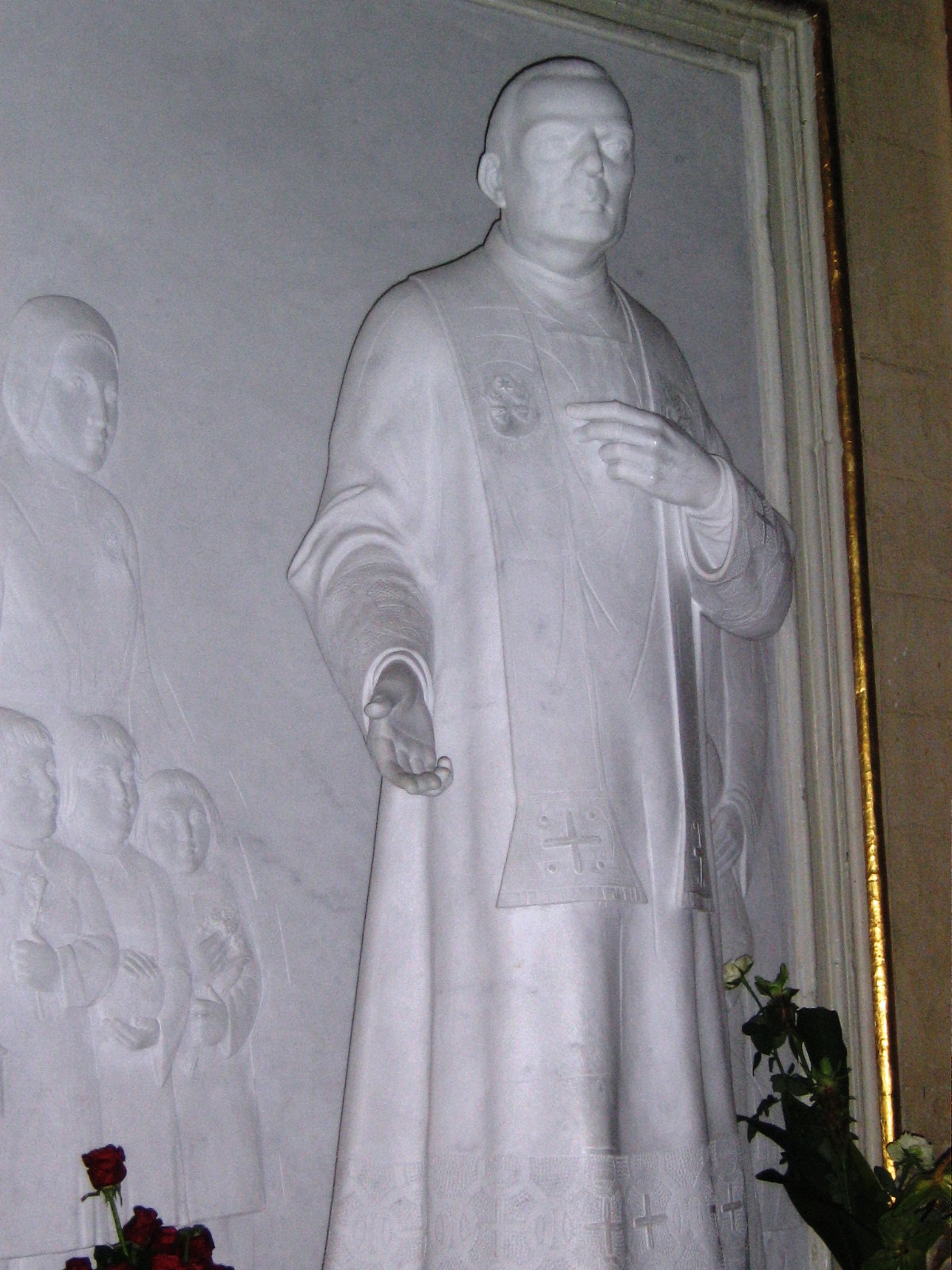
Statue of Lecce-born saint Filippo Smaldone in the city's cathedral

- Antonio Amantea (1894–1983), World War I fighter ace
- Scipione Ammirato (1531–1601), historian and philosopher
- Giuseppe Ayroldi (1895 – 1962), represented Lecce in the Constituent Assembly
- Abraham de Balmes (c. 1450–1523), physician and translator
- Carlo Bollino (born 1961), journalist, writer
- Carmelo Bene (1937–2002), actor, film director, and screenwriter
- Vittorio Bodini (1914–1970), poet and translator
- Massimo Bray (born 1959), intellectual, academic publisher, politician, and former director of the Italian Encyclopaedia of Science, Letters, and Arts (Enciclopedia Treccani), who served in the government of Italy as Minister of Culture
- Carlo Capasa (born 1958), president of Camera Nazionale della Moda Italiana
- Ennio Capasa (born 1960), fashion designer, creator of the Italian fashion house CoSTUME NATIONAL
- Franco Causio (born 1949), retired footballer, 1982 FIFA World Cup winner
- Antonio Conte (born 1969), retired footballer, current manager of Napoli, and former manager of Bari, Siena, Atalanta, Juventus, Chelsea, Tottenham Hotspur and the Italian football team
- Francesco Danieli (born 1981), historian and iconologist
- Cosimo De Giorgi (1842–1922), scientist
- Ennio De Giorgi (1928–1996), mathematician
- Cloe Elmo (1910–1962), opera singer
- Quintus Ennius (c. 239–169 BC), Roman writer and poet
- Vito Fazzi (1851–1918), physician and hospital founder
- Barbara Lezzi (born 1972), politician, who served in the government of Italy as Minister for the South
- Marco Materazzi (born 1973), retired footballer, 2006 FIFA World Cup winner
- Gabriele Poso (born 1978), independent artist, musician, and composer
- Michelangelo Schipa (1854–1939), writer, historian, and scholar
- Tito Schipa (1888–1965), tenor
- Filippo Smaldone (1848–1923), Catholic priest and saint
- Antonio Verrio (c. 1636–1707), painter in England

== International relations ==
=== Twin towns – sister cities ===
Lecce is twinned with:

- Murcia, Spain, since 2004
- Skopje, North Macedonia, since 2005
- Ostrów Wielkopolski, Poland, since 2006
- Valladolid, Spain, since 2009
- Amasya, Turkey

== See also ==
- Roman Catholic Archdiocese of Lecce
- Punta San Cataldo di Lecce Lighthouse
- Brindisi Airport
- Port of Brindisi
