= Filippo Smaldone =

Italian Roman Catholic saint (1848–1923)

Saint Filippo Smaldone
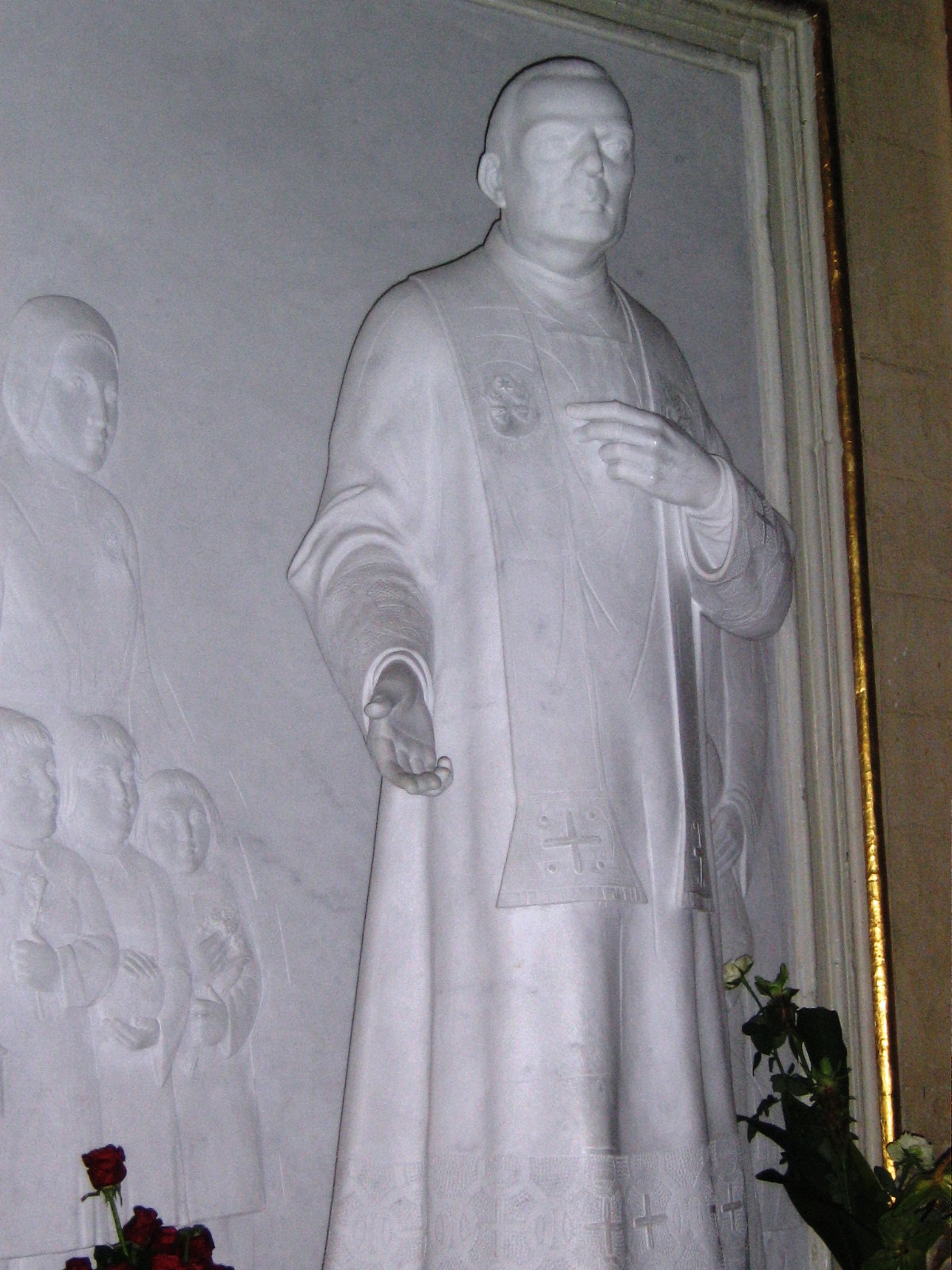
- San Filippo Smaldone

Priest
- Born: 27 July 1848; Naples, Kingdom of the Two Sicilies
- Died: 4 June 1923 (aged 74); Lecce, Kingdom of Italy
- Venerated in: Catholic Church
- Beatified: 12 May 1996, Saint Peter's Square, Vatican City by John Paul II
- Canonized: 15 October 2006, Saint Peter's Square, Vatican City by Pope Benedict XVI
- Feast: 4 June
- Attributes: Cassock
- Patronage: Salesian Sisters of the Sacred Hearts; Deaf people; Mute people

Filippo Smaldone (27 July 1848 – 4 June 1923) was an Italian Roman Catholic priest and the founder of the Salesian Sisters of the Sacred Hearts. Smaldone is best known for his extensive work with the deaf during his lifetime. Smaldone was a gifted preacher known for his commitment to proper catechesis and to the care of orphans and the mute, which earned him civic recognition.

Smaldone's sainthood cause commenced in 1964 and in 1995 he became titled as Venerable under Pope John Paul II who soon after beatified him in mid-1996. Pope Benedict XVI canonized him as a saint of the Catholic Church on 15 October 2006 in Saint Peter's Square.

== Life ==
Filippo Smaldone was born in Naples in 1848 as the first of seven children to Antonio Smaldone and Maria Concetta De Luca. He made his First Communion in 1858 and received his Confirmation in 1862.

He almost failed the examination for minor orders because he did not want to abandon his apostolate for his studies. He returned to Naples in 1876 – with the permission of the Cardinal Archbishop of Naples Sisto Riario Sforza – after a period of education in the Archdiocese of Rossano-Cariati. He was made a subdeacon on 31 July 1870 and ordained a deacon on 27 March 1871.

Smaldone was ordained to the priesthood on 23 September 1871. During his studies he began efforts to help the deaf of Naples and also did work with the sick. But at one stage he grew depressed, being frustrated over his mute students. He asked to give up teaching in favor of going to the foreign missions. But his spiritual director convinced him to remain and to continue his work. Smaldone almost died of cholera when it struck the area in 1884, and he credited his survival to the Madonna. In 1885 he founded an institution for the deaf and for the mute at Lecce on 25 March 1855 with the assistance of Lorenzo Apicella and several nuns that he had under his care. He opened several other branches of his order in 1897 in both Rome and Bari. On 18 December 1912, his order was aggregated to the Order of Friars Minor. The order went on to receive the decree of praise from Pope Benedict XV on 30 November 1915 and full papal approval from Pope Pius XI after Smaldone's death on 21 June 1925.

Smaldone founded both the Eucharistic League of Priest Adorers and the Eucharistic League of Women Adorers to promote the Eucharist and he also served for a brief period of time as the superior of the Missionaries of Saint Francis de Sales. The civic authorities commended and recognized him for his work as did religious authorities who made him a canon of the Lecce Cathedral. In 1880 he was sent to Milan as an expert at a conference of teachers for the deaf.

He died on 4 June 1923 at 9:00 pm from diabetes-related complications combined with heart difficulties. His remains were later relocated in 1942 to the order's motherhouse. In 2005 there was a total of 40 houses with 398 religious in nations such as Rwanda and Moldova.

== Sainthood ==
The canonization cause commenced in an informative process that opened in 1964 under Pope Paul VI and concluded its business sometime after this. The introduction to this process titled him as a Servant of God. The Congregation for the Causes of Saints validated this process in Rome on 23 May 1989 and received the Positio in 1989 which allowed for theologians to approve it on 3 February 1995 and the C.C.S. to likewise approve the cause on 16 May 1995. Pope John Paul II declared Smaldone to be Venerable on 11 July 1995 after the pope confirmed that the priest had indeed lived a model Christian life of heroic virtue.

The miracle needed for beatification was investigated and then validated on 7 May 1993 while a medical board later approved it on 1 June 1995. Theologians also assented to this miracle on 27 October 1995 as did the C.C.S. on 12 December 1995. John Paul II issued formal assent needed and deemed that the healing was a miracle attributed to Smaldone's intercession on 12 January 1996, and presided over Smaldone's beatification on 12 May 1996. The process for a second miracle spanned from 2000 to 2002 at which point it received validation on 4 April 2003 before receiving the assent of the medical board on 3 February 2005; theologians assented to it on 17 May 2005 as did the C.C.S. on 17 January 2006. Pope Benedict XVI approved this on 28 April 2006 and canonized Smaldone in Saint Peter's Square on 15 October 2006.
