= Punta San Cataldo di Lecce Lighthouse =

Lighthouse in Italy

Punta San Cataldo di Lecce
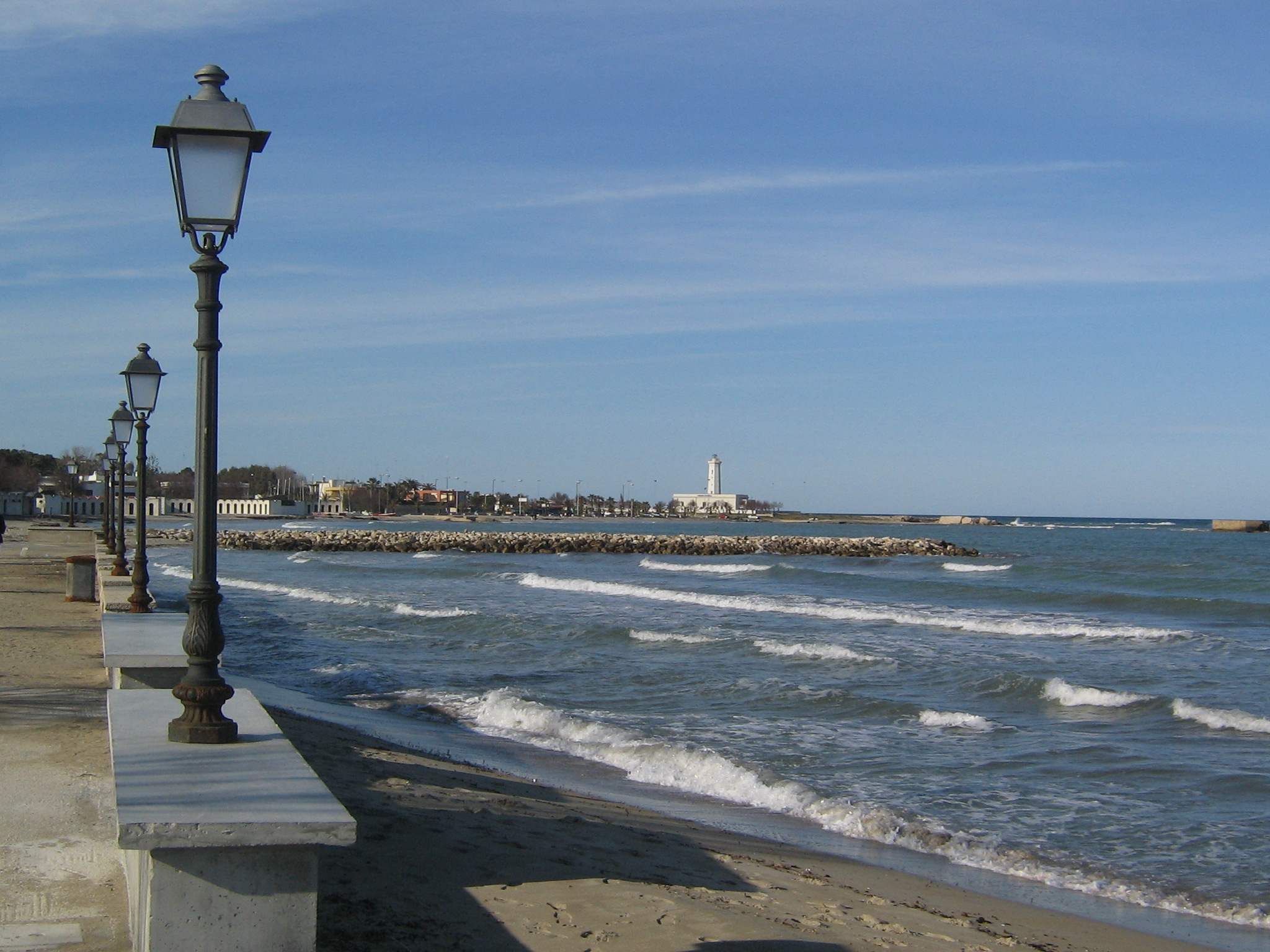
- Punta San Cataldo di Lecce Lighthouse
- Location: Lecce; Apulia; Italy
- Coordinates: 40°23′27″N 18°18′24″E

Tower
- Constructed: 1866 (first)
- Construction: stone tower
- Automated: yes
- Height: 23 metres (75 ft)
- Shape: tapered octagonal prism tower with balcony and lantern
- Markings: white tower, grey metallic lantern dome
- Power source: mains electricity
- Operator: Marina Militare

Light
- First lit: 1897 (current)
- Deactivated: 2000-2008
- Focal height: 25 metres (82 ft)
- Lens: Type OF 500
- Intensity: AL 1000 W
- Range: main: 16 nautical miles (30 km; 18 mi) reserve: 12 nautical miles (22 km; 14 mi)
- Characteristic: L Fl W 5s.
- Italy no.: 3612 E.F.

Punta San Cataldo di Lecce Lighthouse (Italian: Faro di Punta San Cataldo di Lecce) is an active lighthouse located on the eastern point of San Cataldo di Lecce in the Salentine Peninsula 12 kilometres (7.5 mi) from Lecce on the Adriatic Sea.

== History ==
The first plan to build a lighthouse was signed on February 25, 1865, in the meantime a temporary light was installed on a building of property of the municipality. In February 1893 the final design was approved and on December 31, 1895, the construction of the keeper's house and the lighthouse were completed and activated definitely in 1897.

== Description ==
The lighthouse consists of a white tapered octagonal prism stone tower, 23 feet (7.0 m) high, with balcony and lantern, rising from a 1-storey white keeper's house. The lantern, painted in grey metallic, is positioned at 25 metres (82 ft) above sea level and emits one long white flash in a 5 seconds period, visible up to a distance of 16 nautical miles (30 km; 18 mi). The lighthouse is completely automated and is managed by the Marina Militare with the identification code number 3612 E.F.

== See also ==
- List of lighthouses in Italy
- Lecce
