= Castle of Charles V =

Castle in Lecce, Apulia, Italy

Coordinates: 40°21′8″N 18°10′30″E

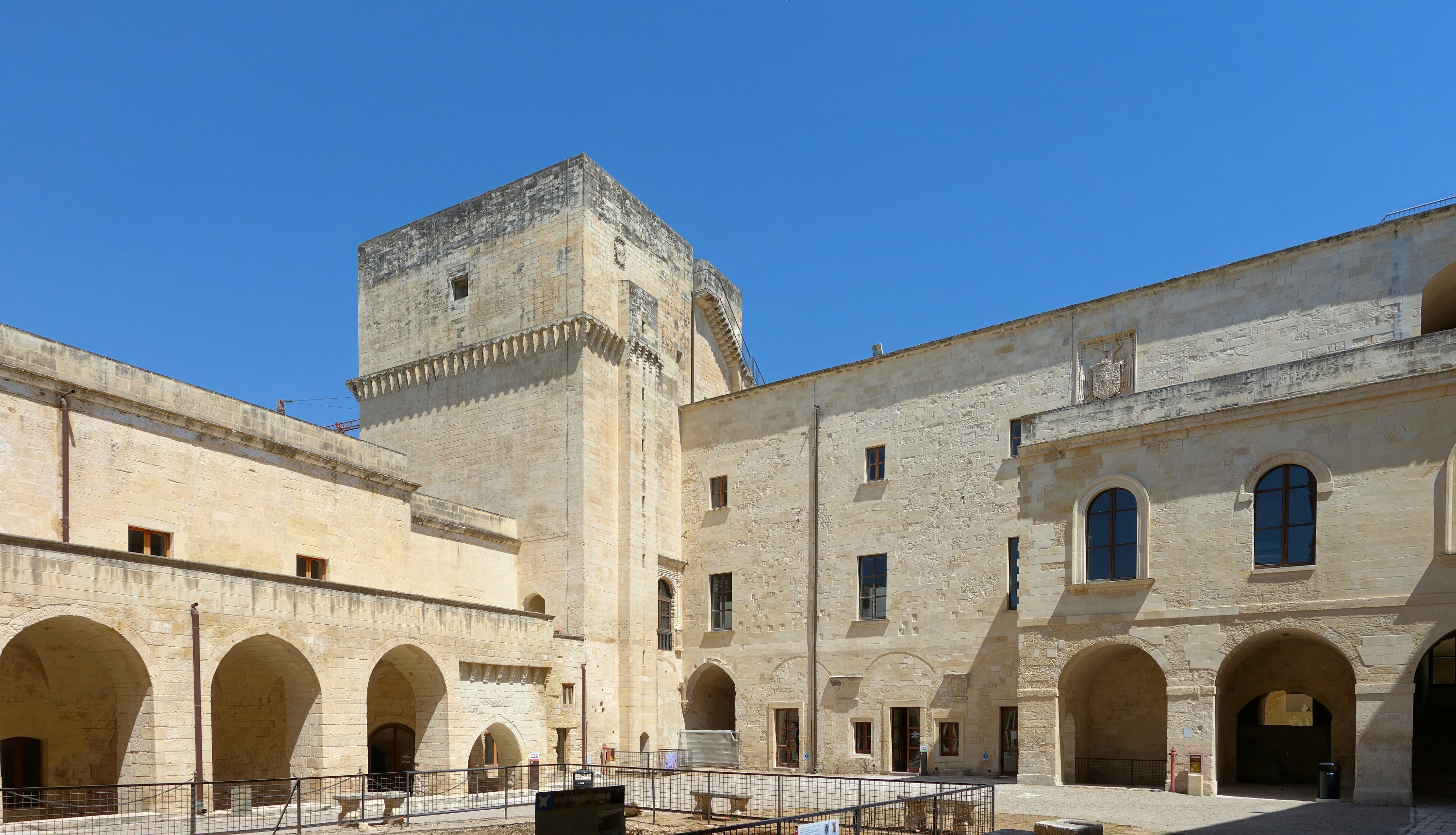
Castle of Charles V

The Castle of Charles V (Italian: Castello Carlo Quinto), also known as the Castello di Lecce, is a historic fortress located in Lecce, Italy. Originally constructed during the Middle Ages, the castle was extensively reinforced in 1539 under the orders of Charles V. The redesign was carried out by the military architect Gian Giacomo dell'Acaya.

To make way for the fortress, two existing buildings were demolished: the Chapel of the Trinity and the Monastery of the Benedictine Order of the Holy Cross. While its primary purpose was defensive, the castle also served cultural and civic functions. In the 18th century, one of its halls was used as a theatre. From 1870 to 1979, it functioned as a military district.

Today, the castle hosts the Department of Cultural Affairs of the Municipality of Lecce and serves as a venue for numerous cultural events.

The interior is notable for its elegant decoration, including carved capitals, a grand hall with large stained-glass windows, and massive stone columns supporting the upper floors. According to legend, the Orsini del Balzo family, who owned the castle in the 14th century, kept a white bear in the moat. The animal served both as a symbol of status and as a deterrent to intruders.
