= Vito Fazzi =

Italian politician

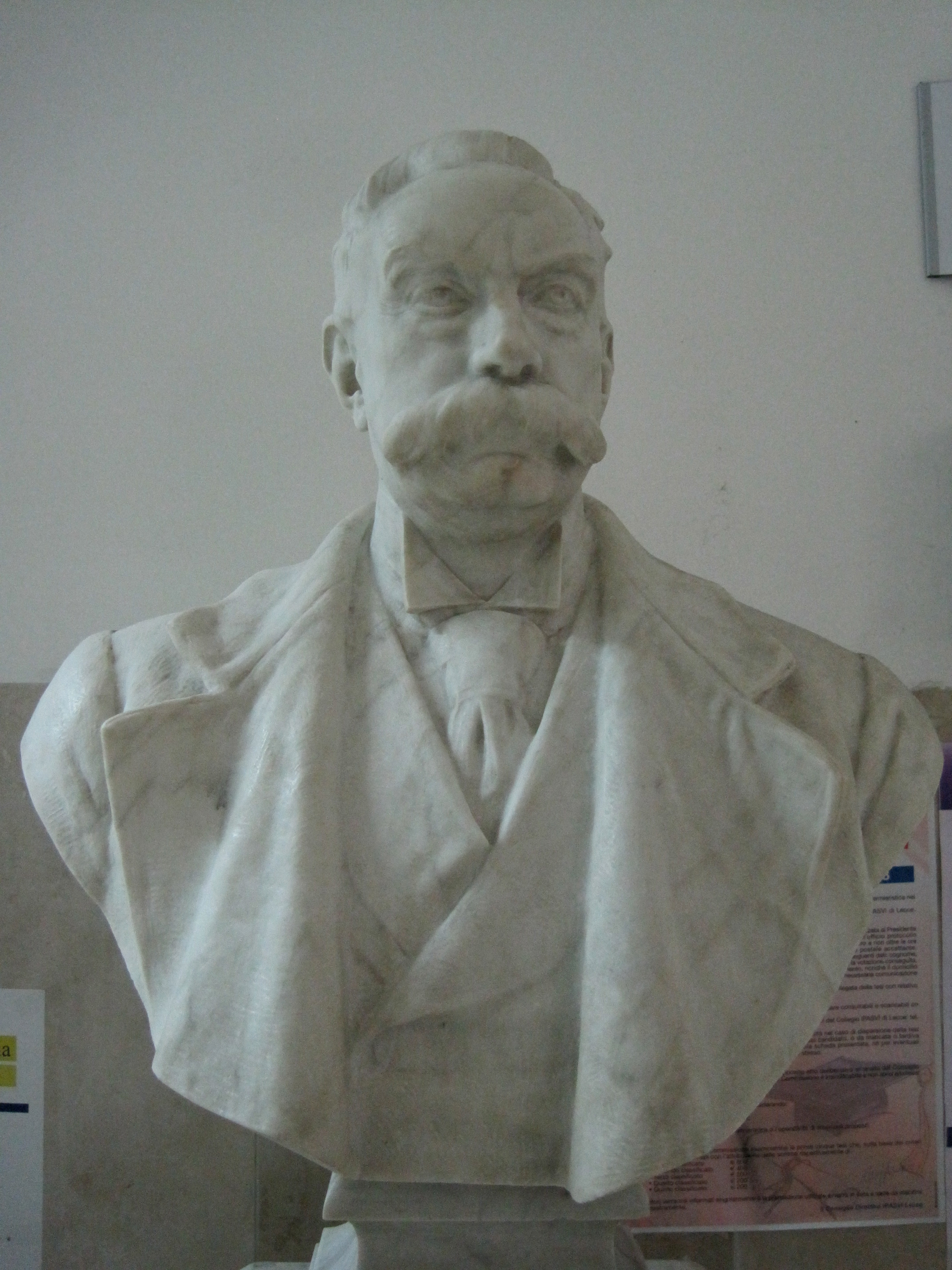
- Born: 23 December 1851; Melpignano, Italy
- Died: 12 January 1918 (aged 66); Lecce
- Scientific career
- Fields: medicine, politics
- Workplaces: Civil Hospital in Lecce

Vito Fazzi (1851–1918) was an Italian doctor and politician who lived in Lecce in the second half of the 19th century. His work was fundamental for the construction of the first big modern civil hospital in Lecce.

== Biography ==
=== Life and personality ===
Vito Fazzi was born in Melpignano (Lecce) on 23 December 1851. He was the firstborn son of Gaetano Fazzi (1823-1890around), a renowned doctor in Lecce, and Concetta Gerardi (1832-1916), daughter of an important noble landowner. His wife, Adele Profilo, died at the age of 23 during the birth of her second daughter. According to a philological analysis, his name means “Faber Vitae”, that is “life maker”; this quality emerges in the speeches and epitaphs pronounced during his funeral. He was a very reflective and modest man; it is meaningful that in his study he had a portrait of a patient who unfortunately died during a surgical operation made by himself. In such a way he underlined the importance of reminding the mistakes made in the past in order to learn by them.

=== Political and medical career ===
Vito Fazzi was not only a very important doctor, but also a great politician. He became city councillor with responsibility for public hygiene and he intensified the fight against malaria reclaiming wetlands. He was also elected President of Lecce province. In 1887 he began the construction of a psychiatric hospital, which was opened in 1901. He entered the Parliament in 1903 and promoted politics of growth and development for his land during the XXI, XXII, XIV legislatures. He died at the age of 66, on 12 January 1918. His biggest achievement was the construction of the new city civil hospital, which was completed in 1913. After his death, in 1922, Lecce medical council decided to call the new hospital “ Vito Fazzi” in memory of this great doctor who changed the sanitary story of his city. A memorial of Vito Fazzi, a sculpture made by a famous artist, Guacci, was located and it is still today in the main hall of the hospital.

== See also ==
- Lecce
- Lecce Province
- Parliament

== Bibliography ==
- Luigi Alfonso, Gli ospedali di Lecce. Dallo Spirito Santo all'Oncologico, Edizioni Grifo, 2009
