= Macquarie Field House =

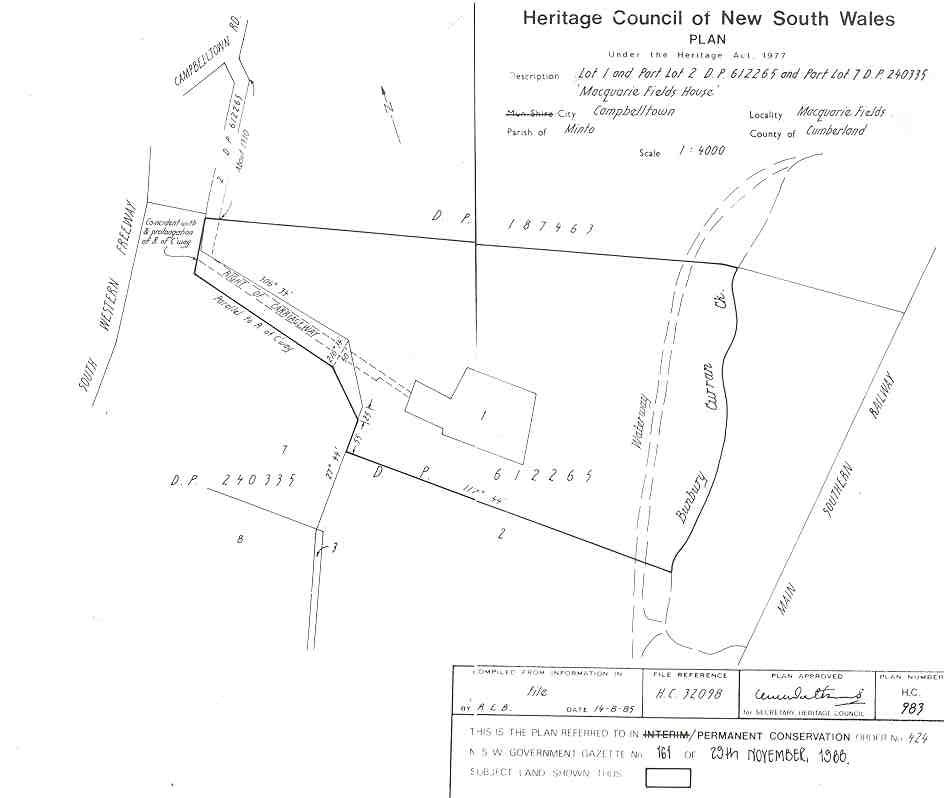
- Heritage boundaries

- Location within Sydney Location within Australia
- 33°58′40″S 150°52′38″E
- Location: Quarter Sessions Road, Macquarie Fields, City of Campbelltown, New South Wales, Australia

History
- Built: 1810–1843

Site notes
- Architects: James Meehan (first house; barn); James Hume (attrib: second; current house)

New South Wales Heritage Register
- Official name: Macquarie Field House; And the Meehan remains; "Macquariefield"; Macquarie Fields; Macquarie Field
- Type: State heritage (landscape)
- Designated: 2 April 1999
- Reference no.: 424
- Type: Farm
- Category: Farming and Grazing
- Builders: James Meehan (first house); Mr Burns (woodwork in second, current house)

Macquarie Field House is a heritage-listed former farm, private school and homestead and now residence at Quarter Sessions Road, Macquarie Fields, City of Campbelltown, New South Wales, Australia. It was designed by James Meehan (first house, barn), James Hume (attrib: second and current house) and built from 1810 to 1843 by James Meehan (first house); Mr Burns (woodwork in second, current house). It is also known as Macquarie Field House and the Meehan remains; Macquariefield, Macquarie Fields and Macquarie Field. The property is privately owned. It was added to the New South Wales State Heritage Register on 2 April 1999.

== History ==
An initial 1809 grant of 45 hectares (110 acres) to James Meehan had expanded to 1,113 hectares (2,750 acres) (202 hectares (500 acres) of which were cleared) by 1820, 971 hectares (2,400 acres) in 1826, 672 hectares (1,660 acres) in 1877, approximately 167 hectares (412 acres) were in NSW Government ownership by 1944, the remaining area of open space today is not stated nor analysed. The current SHR curtilage area, plus land proposed in the application to be community open space, totals approximately 28.25 hectares (69.8 acres).

Meehan (1774–1826) was a middle-class Catholic Irishman whose flirtation with the Society of United Irishmen in 1796–98 led to his conviction as a member of a proscribed organisation, although he did not take part in the actual uprising (the 'Irish Rebellion') of 1798. As a result, the 25-year-old school teacher and surveyor arrived in Sydney in February 1800 on the convict ship "Friendship" to serve a life sentence. Because of his valuable experience as a surveyor in Ireland, Meehan was soon assigned to the Surveyor-General of the colony, at first Augustus Alt, but after 1801, Charles Grimes. Meehan was the only one of four assistant surveyors with qualifications, so from the start his competence and diligence earned him uncommon freedoms and by 1803 he had done survey work not only on Sydney's Cumberland Plain but as far afield as the Hunter, Port Phillip and Van Diemen's Land. In 1805 he received a conditional pardon and was acting as chief surveyor of NSW in Grimes' absence. Meehan had, while still a convict, received a land grant of 100 acres in the Field of Mars in 1803.

By 1802 he had been on two major expeditions and, by 1806, had been conditionally pardoned. He continued to work on departmental duties, and, from difficult beginnings, had a remarkable rise to be an important colonial surveyor, explorer and settler, surveying and mapping large areas of the country. The early towns of Sydney, Parramatta, Bathurst, Port Macquarie and Hobart were all explored, laid out and measured by Meehan. A statue of him was commissioned by the Land & Property Management Authority to commemorate Meehan's close collaboration with NSW Public Works Heritage Services and the Government Architect's Office. This new statue of Meehan was placed on the south-east corner of the former Lands Department Building in November 2010 to commemorate Meehan's achievements.

In 1806 Meehan began living with English convict, Ruth Goodaire, in a leased town house. Their son Thomas was born in 1808 and daughter Mary in 1810. While senior surveyor, Meehan received 53 hectares (130 acres) in Bankstown in 1808 and in June and August 1809 two grants in Minto totalling 182 hectares (450 acres) straddling Bunbury Curran Creek. He gave up his Field of Mars grant, but when Governor Macquarie arrived in 1810 and regularised most of the grants made in the difficult preceding years, Meehan's Minto holdings were increased by the addition of several adjacent farms, surrendered by their previous grantees, making an integrated estate of 461 hectares (1,140 acres) in 1810. It was a provision of Macquarie's grant and regrant of 1810 that Meehan must cultivate 30 hectares (75 acres) at Minto by 1815 and, although there are few details, there is no doubt that Meehan developed the estate while continuing as a busy government surveyor until 1822. He acquired more adjacent land and in October 1816 Macquarie issued a further consolidating grant for a "Macquariefield" which now embraced 817 hectares (2,020 acres).

It is not known how soon (after 1809) Meehan began to erect substantial buildings. Huts would, however, have been required for stockmen from the beginning and certainly by 1814 when he was supplying the government with 1,814 kilograms (4,000 lb) of meat, the same as his neighbours Charles Throsby and William Redfern. In the first years much of the acreage remained uncleared and uncultivated. There was certainly some kind of accommodation on the estate by 1811, when the Governor directed people with promises of land in Airds to 'attend at Mr Meehan's Farm on the Bunbury Curran Creek' to meet the surveyor. The brick barn is plausibly dated to between 1814 and 1816. The question is open whether the main house was built before or after the barn and whether the house was built in stages. At all events, it was complete when Rev. Thomas Reddell converted it into a school in 1821.

There was more consistent direct oversight in 1818 and 1819 when Meehan was spending more time there than at his Sydney house. But Macquarie then insisted that his senior surveyor be resident in Sydney. Meehan complied and at the end of 1820 agreed to lease the house and garden to the governor for use by the Rev. Thomas Reddall as a private school for 18 months. During this time Governor Macquarie's son Lachlan attended this school. When Meehan returned to Macquariefield in 1822 land cleared for crops amounted to only 77 hectares (190 acres), most of which was used for wheat, the remaining 16 hectares (40 acres) for maize. Grazing land supported 16 horses, 450 cattle, 1200 sheep and 25 pigs. He immediately sought the help of convict clearing gangs and between June 1822 and June 1823 28 hectares (70 acres) were cleared. Meehan used Macquariefield primarily for stock and only secondarily for cropping.

The first house built on this site, 'Meehan's Castle', built c. 1810 but possibly not completed until 1818, was a two-storey structure of even greater prominence on the then bare hill than the later (and remaining) house which was built in the 1840s. Meehan chose its site because it was the only strategic outcrop in the region, effectively being a naturally fortified rampart with panoramic views. This was important for both security and observation, in Sydney's first expansion to the southwest in a time of Aboriginal attacks and general unrest. The siting shows Meehan's skill in planning the settlement of New South Wales.

Meehan built a second complex, including an 11-room farmhouse, dairy and an eight-stall stable, at some distance to the north of his own house, more accessible to Bunbury Curran Creek. This ancillary farmhouse is probably the two-storey building shown by artist Frederick Terry (1850s-60s watercolour panorama) on the extreme right of his painting. Although the barn on the main site has been claimed as a convict barracks, the labourers on Meehan's estate are much more likely to have been accommodated in the 11-room farmhouse. The buildings of this second group do not seem to have survived and their archaeological potential is unknown.

In 1822 Meehan retired from his position as Deputy Surveyor-General and for the first time became a full-time farmer. He was in some financial stress, partly because the government had paid only the first installment of rent for Reddall's use of Macquariefield as a school and there were arrears in salary payments for his last months in office. Accordingly, in 1823 he mortgaged the property to Samuel Terry for over £1300. Terry was the classic instance of a successful convict. By hard work, shrewdness and ruthless determination he had become a merchant and land dealer of heroic proportions. He is known as "the Botany Bay Rothschild".

Meehan died in April 1826. On his death, all his real estate passed to his only son, Thomas. In 1829, two years after probate had been granted, Terry complained that no payment had yet been made to him and that Thomas was "dispensing and otherwise making away with the personal property of his late Father... to the great injury of the Creditors". Terry was successful in obtaining letters of administration and appointed William Charles Wentworth as proctor to protect his interests. Terry then sued Thomas Meehan for £5,000 and on 25 January 1831 Thomas transferred the 817 hectares (2,020 acres) of Macquariefield to the mortgagee. The normal spelling (of its name) then changed to "Macquarie Field". Terry himself never lived at Macquarie Field: it was only one of a string of major pastoral properties he acquired. His preferred residence was Box Hill House on the Windsor Road. When Samuel died in 1838, his huge estate was divided among his children and step-children.

The five or six buildings on the estate advertised for sale in April 1829 were substantial. Only one (the barn) now survives above ground, but the precise location of the principal residence can be fixed because of historic images and material remains, while the general location of others is known from an abortive subdivision in July 1829.

Under Samuel Terry's will, his youngest child, Martha Foxlowe Hosking, born in 1811, received Macquarie Field, town houses in Pitt Street and 10,000 pounds. She also inherited a share in the residual estate; and when her brother Edward died childless in 1838, she inherited much of his wealth also. Her father was very careful to ensure that Martha held Macquarie Field in her own right and that the profit from the estate remained for "her sole and separate use". She had married John Hosking in 1829, son of a prominent school teacher. After six years in Britain, Hosking returned to Sydney in 1825 as an ambitious businessman. In partnership with John Terry Hughes, Martha's cousin, he had a flamboyant career as a merchant, land dealer and pastoralist. He was elected Sydney's first Lord Mayor in 1842 and considered standing for the Legislative Council.

The firm of Hughes and Hosking however, over-reached itself and went insolvent in 1843–45. The 1845 Insolvency Court proceedings reveal much about the building of the second Macquarie Field house. 'A cottage was commenced about 2 years before my sequestration (1841) - and I think it was not finally completed until after my sequestration (1843). In consideration of my receiving 10,000 pounds in cash from Mr Terry's will - a legacy to Mrs Hosking, and other moneys which came to my hands in consequence of the death of her brother, I agreed with Mrs Hosking that I should build the cottage, which has cost, with other improvements, about 2000 ponds - it may be more'. Hosking goes out of his way (in giving evidence) to declare that 'No portion of the sum due to Mr Hume (is) for building or for any work at "Macquarie Field".' This is a reference to documents elsewhere in the legal exhibits. James Hume had designed and built three houses in Cumberland Street in The Rocks for Hosking in 1843 and two years later was still owed 250 pounds for those services. Hosking's disclaimer in 1845 shows that Hume had also designed Macquarie Field House (the second homestead) in 1841 and had supervised its construction over the next two years. Hume had come to Sydney from Scotland in 1835 at the invitation of Alexander Macleay to assist John Verge in constructing the Elizabeth Bay House, while simultaneously supervising works at St. Andrew's Cathedral. He first appears as an independent architect in 1839 designing the Gothic Presbyterian church in Wollongong. More significant commissions in the early 1840s included Sir Thomas Mitchell's Carthona (Darling Point) and Parkhall (St. Mary's Towers, at Douglas Park), the new Jewish Synagogue and Presbyterian Church in Pitt Street, while Hume was also supervising construction of Burdekin House in Macquarie Street.

James Hume has not previously appeared as a possible architect for the Hoskings' new house. The only candidate who has hitherto been proposed is Francis Clarke, supported, with caution, by Rachel Roxburgh. Clarke had come to the colony with good English credentials in 1832 and is best known for his Anglican churches at Richmond and at St. Marys, both built between 1837 and 1841. The only surviving private home tentatively attributed to him, on slender evidence, is Lindesay at Darling Point. Clarke was a friend of the Hoskings, chosen by them in 1842 to be one of two trustees to protect Martha's interests in the Macquarie Field estate. He had by 1836 built a suite of houses in Pitt Street for Samuel Terry that was inherited by Martha in 1838. But evidence in support of Clarke (as architect of Macquarie Field House) is entirely inferential, whereas the words of John Hosking himself, retrieved from a stack of court papers after 170 years, now make it almost certain that the architect of this house was Hume.

The present Macquarie Field House was built some 150 metres (490 ft) to the south-east (of Meehan's Castle) in the early 1840s, but the houses co-existed for over a century. Meehan's farmhouse was not demolished until 1958.

Although Hosking kept horses and carriages at Macquarie Field and furnished the cottage, for which he received £3,000 from his wife, the couple did not live there in the 1840s. The brand new house was occupied by an overseer, who was a ticket-of-leave man called William Potter, and there were 12 salaried workmen, probably housed in one or both of Meehan's farmhouses. There was a characteristic range of trades covering the needs of a colonial mixed farm: ploughman, groom, bullock-driver, carter, wheelwright, cook, dairyman and gardener. There was a casual burner of stumps on newly cleared land as well as a casual trencher. The Hoskings were using Macquarie Field as part of their own estates from at least 1834. Young Nimrod, a stallion bred by Samuel Terry, was serving mares at Macquarie Field in 1839 and 1840 under Hosking's superintendent there, James Marshall. After 1843 there was a turnover of superintendents living in the new house: William Potter (1844), G. Peacock (1845). The farm was used as a staging post for supplies to more distant stations which engaged the interest of John and Martha Hosking, at Molonglo near Canberra and on the Macintyre River up on the Queensland border. The dairy produced butter for the Sydney market. Horse-breeding with stallions such as Young Nimrod and Vagabond continued, producing walers for the Indian market in the 1850s. In 1854 Hosking was able to sell off 100 surplus horses as well as a thoroughbred Durham bull. At this time in 1854 the Hoskings were living in Vaucluse House, while the Wentworths were away. But in 1855 the Hoskings moved for the first and only time to Macquarie Field and made it their principal residence until 1858. Three significant changes were made to the house in those three years: the addition of the front portico, construction of a garden alcove and installation of a grand driveway close to the Liverpool Road.

From 1858 until early 1869, the barn and Meehan's former residence were renovated and adapted to accommodate a boys' boarding school, run by Rev. George Macarthur. The residence became dormitories, with accommodation for the matron as well as some store rooms. Macarthur took over administration of and teaching of boys for (from) The Kings School in this location when it fell into troubled times at its base in Parramatta.

After Macarthur's school moved to The Kings School in Parramatta in 1869, Meehan's house gradually deteriorated, and became more store than residence, as a 1924 E.G.Shaw photograph.

Macquarie Field House estate was closely associated with the alignment chosen for the Great Southern Railway Line. The then owner of Macquarie Fields House, John Hoskings Jr, (first Mayor of Sydney) was a member of the Liverpool Committee making recommendations on the route for the new southern railway line in the 1850s. The line to Campbelltown was opened in 1858 and Macquarie Fields formed a significant part of the attractive scenery along the route, described as including elegant cottages and substantial homesteads. In 1862 the line was extended to Menangle, and in 1869 a railway platform (later Ingleburn station) was opened on the Macquarie Fields estate. As a stimulant to regional development, carrier of pupils to the school on site from 1858 to 1869, and commuters since 1858, the views from the railway line are of key importance to the understanding and presentation of this property, and its importance in association with the property, and in determining an appropriate curtilage and defining key views, can not be overlooked.

Macquarie Field House and its associated farmlands have attracted public interest over a long period of time, as is reflected by their inclusion in the original County of Cumberland Planning Scheme of 1951. The National Trust of Australia (NSW) nominated the house in 1964 and classified it on their register in 1974. The Australian Heritage Commission received a nomination in 1977 and listed the house on the Register of the National Estate in 1978. The Commission separately received a nomination in 1981 for the garden, noting its deliberate siting and visual prominence, which led to a further listing in 1991.

In response to concerns in the late 1970s at the prospect of Government disposal, possible subdivision of the land and the house's demise, the then Minister for Planning & Environment placed a permanent conservation order over the house in 1981. This was made over Lot 1, comprising the house and a small area of land comprising the top of the hilltop on which it sits, most of its plantings and a small area of slope to the east.

This lot and PCO boundary were created for sale to Mr David Jamieson, who had leased the house since 1962 and restored it. This also alienated the house protecting it from the activities of the Veterinary Research Station, but maintained all other structures, archaeological sites and land (including the remains of Meehan's Castle demolished by the Army for the Department of Agriculture in 1943) in government ownership. These were left outside Lot 1 and the 1981 PCO, because the land outside Lot 1 was managed by the Department of Agriculture for agricultural purposes (an appropriate setting), and was not considered to be under threat.

When the Department of Agriculture in 1982 notified its intention to move its operations to Camden, and proposals forwarded to redevelop the site (from rural to residential), it was found necessary to extend the PCO boundary to include Meehan's Castle and other relics, in the second, expanded PCO of 1985. This boundary included the land east of the house down to Bunbury Curran Creek, and more of the Hilltop slopes to the northeast and north of the house, including part of the original entrance drive along Quarter Sessions Road, thought to provide a more appropriate rural curtilage.

In response to the Department of Agriculture's decision in 1982 to relocate their operations to Camden and possibly redevelop the site (for residential rather than rural use) the then Department of Environment & Planning adopted a recommendation to retain the land as a non-urban backdrop to the northern urban areas of Campbelltown and to cater for special use services which may require a site in future. In 1985 the area of the permanent conservation order was extended to include outbuildings, key tree plantings, archaeological remains of the earlier house, "Meehan's Castle", the hilltop on which the homestead group is sited and the "visual curtilage" of this rural site.

Campbelltown City Council approved a Local Environmental Plan and a Development Control Plan over the adjoining rural land in 1991, to ensure appropriate rural type uses in any future development, which would respect the heritage significance of the property and its regional role as providing both a landmark and a rural backdrop to adjoining suburbs Glenfield, Macquarie Fields and Ingleburn to the east.

The current SHR curtilage boundary thus reflects concerns in the early 1980s that the Department of Agriculture would relocate, and the land would be subdivided and redeveloped, which in turn could cause damage to plantings, structures, outbuildings, important known archaeological relics, such as the remains of Meehan's Castle and to the rural setting of Macquarie Fields House. The north and south boundaries followed existing fencing lines.

Campbelltown City Council's DCP 63 of 1991 and the Masterplan adopted in line with DCP 63 have further defined areas of visual sensitivity on this land, including two corridors of visual significance through the adjoining valleys and significant landscape features in views from the southwestern freeway, being the highest ridgeline, off which Macquarie Fields House's hilltop branches as a spur.

The Monarch development, Macquarie Links, in construction to the south of Macquarie Fields House's hilltop has compromised the open, rural setting of the place and is considered intrusive. This development has introduced two storey dwellings located both high on the ridge (a DCP 63 identified significant landscape feature) requiring visual screening from the southwestern freeway by earth mounding (further reducing the views available from the ridgeline to the east), close to the Macquarie Fields House hilltop and outbuildings, and on the upper valley slopes, also items of high visual significance as viewed from the railway line, Glenfield, Macquarie Fields and Ingleburn to the east. Despite Macquarie Fields House's dense screen planting close to the homestead reducing the views to this development from the house, this development will continue to erode the visual significance of the setting of Macquarie Fields House as a remnant farm estate, and its associated plantings could also in time further obscure the open views to and from the property.

A Visual Character Study by Cloustons was commissioned by the Department of Urban Affairs & Planning in late 1998 in response to public concern about the adverse impacts of the Macquarie Links development immediately south of Macquarie Fields House, which is highly visible from the southwestern freeway and from the railway line and suburbs to the east. The study noted that part of the proposed housing (in the southeast corner) was within the DCP 63 significant view corridor. While this study was valuable in documenting views and visual impacts from the freeway and in ranking landscape character elements, the Heritage Office had strong concerns about its inadequacy in giving equal weight to addressing the visual impacts of the development from the railway line to the east, in line with the intent of LEP 112 and DCP 63 to retain rural landscape character. The Heritage Office voiced concern that new housing on open valley slopes, a landscape character element ranked in this study as having high visual significance, would have adverse visual impacts on the retention of open rural landscape. The Heritage Office also commented that this open landscape character is of high cultural value as part of the heritage curtilage or setting of Macquarie Fields House.

The Heritage Council decided at its meeting of 19 August 1999 not to grant approval for a community title subdivision comprising 171 residential lots, one heritage protection lot and one community association lot including 9 private accessways, on land known as Macquarie Fields, considering that the development would materially effect the heritage significance of Macquarie Fields House, in part because it required the subdivision of the existing SHR curtilage.

The Heritage Council informed Campbelltown City Council that it considered there should be no further subdivision of the SHR curtilage, that it noted the absence of a conservation management plan for the property, and, at that time, the absence of a heritage impact statement addressing the integrity of Macquarie Fields House as a remnant rural estate including open farmland.

The Heritage Council invited the applicant to prepare a conservation management plan for the whole estate including the house and open lands outside the SHR curtilage, and to submit a heritage impact statement for any future proposal, based on the recommendations of this conservation management plan.

The Heritage Council also commented in relation to impacts of the application outside the SHR curtilage that it considered the land use, scale, density and form of the development proposed did not respect the cultural heritage significance of Macquarie Fields House and its setting.

The Heritage Council recommended that Campbelltown City Council and the applicant undertake further work to review DCP 63 and the adopted masterplan for the land to take into account recent approvals and development (since 1991), the recommendations of a Heritage Council study Colonial Landscapes of the Cumberland Plain and Camden concerning Macquarie Fields House estate, recommendations of the applicant's 1998 Curtilage Study and appropriate design detail on treatments, colours and materials of any buildings or structures, minimum lot sizes, setbacks required from key elements and greater detail on how the open, rural character of the land can be conserved and enhanced.

At its meeting on 20 January 2000 the Heritage Council resolved to defer final resolution on the amended application by Winten Property Group DA G3000 12/98 for a community title subdivision of 168 community title dwellings and community facilities on Lot 4 DP 854870, Lots 1, 3 & 7 DP 828871 and Lot 1 DP 612265 Campbelltown Road and Quarter Sessions Road, Glenfield.

== Description ==
=== Setting ===
Macquarie Field House is the core of a remnant colonial farm and an important and rare surviving example of a substantial mid-19th century colonial farm estate on the Cumberland Plain in open, cleared land. It comprises a homestead group, garden and outbuildings set on top of an eastern facing ridge, flanked by two small valleys to north and south. The Southern valley contains a recent golf course residential estate, Macquarie Links Estate. The northern valley contains home paddocks once part of the farm, with some scattered African olive trees along fence lines. Additional paddocks form part of different land ownerships, including to the north and north-east, the former Glenfield Agricultural Research Station and Hurlstone Agricultural High School.

The ridge is elevated giving the homestead (once) expansive views to the north, east and south-east and (once) also to the west. The Hume Highway passes close by to the west, now screened by sound walls. Macquarie Fields House's hilltop site has panoramic views available for an arc of about 270 degrees, from the northwest to southwest.

The house's hilltop twin hoop pine tree plantings are (and formerly the house also was) a prominent landmark in the district, due to their siting on a prominent spur close to the highest ridgeline, as viewed from the Great Southern Railway line, and higher parts of Glenfield, Macquarie Fields and Ingleburn.

=== Garden and Outbuildings ===
The homestead sits on the eastern tip of the elevated ridge - almost a peninsula in landform. To its west are a number of farm outbuildings, some 19th century and some 20th century. A large ruin of a colonial brick structure, possibly an agricultural store building or barn, lies to the house's south-west.

The garden is neglected for much of the late 20th century but is in essence a mid 19th century hill-top garden. Its detail has been almost totally destroyed however, its planting of 2 very large hoop pines (Araucaria cunninghamii), African olives (Olea europaea var. Africana) and two species of pepper trees, Brazilian (Schinus molle var. areira) and Chilean (S. terebinthifolia) survives forming a prominent landmark of dense closely textured plantation on a dominant hill-top site.

Two impressive sets of entrance gates and piers (one set a re-construction) open onto the drive, now brick paved, which leads to the house sited on a level hill-top plateau overlooking the village of Macquarie Fields to the east. The drive, originally encircling the house, now terminates in a paved car park, the rest being grassed over.

The plateau and original drive are ringed with African olives and pepper trees. More olives, the remnants of hedges and also self-sown, clothe the sides of the hill.

Built into the hillside, directly below the front of the house (i.e. east) is an elliptical, apsidal, restored brick alcove or belvedere for a garden seat, now in ruins. A roof has been recently built to protect this structure.

=== House ===
The house is essentially two storied, being raised above extensive cellars, accessed by a staircase internally on its west. The front door faces east, the rear door west, with a central corridor and rooms arrayed to north and south.

A bay window on the house's northern side allows clear views into the northern valley with its home paddocks.

=== Modifications and dates ===
- 1809: initial grant of 110 acres (44ha) to Meehan
- 1814–16: barn constructed
- 1820: expanded to 2750 acres (500 acres of which were cleared)
- 1821: adaptation for use as private school - house became a dormitory and matron's quarters
- 1826: estate expanded to 2400 acres (960ha) (Jack (2015)says 2020 acres)
- 1841–43: construction of second (current) homestead by James Hume
- 1855–58: addition of portico to front verandah; addition of garden alcove into slope east of house's front, installation of grand driveway close to Liverpool Road by 1860: grand double gates to the estate entrance from the Liverpool Road
- 1877: estate shrank to 1660 acres (664ha)
- 1939: house (first house) described as "in ruins", scheduled for demolition after estate came into government hands in 1940s
- 1944: approximately 412 acres were in Government ownership
- 1958: First house demolished with assistance of army and bulldozers, original bricks pushed into the cellar, at least one nearby well and probably down the slope adjacent
- 1962: conservation works; removal of portico off front verandah
- The current SHR curtilage area, plus land proposed in the application to be community open space, totals approximately 28.25ha.
- 1991: archaeological investigation (Noel Bell Ridley Smith - investigating design of a training and conference centre).

=== Further information ===
Urgent stabilisation ("emergency" intervention) is required in relation to:

- the summer house;
- the barn/granary/convict barracks;
- the main entry gates and associated fencing;

Short term intervention is required in relation to:

- the sandstone plinths at front and rear of the house;
- the curved stone plinth adjacent to the summer house;
- removal of fill from the rectangular water storage tank;
- identification of all footings from the period of James Meehan's occupation of the site;

"Emergency" intervention is considered necessary to ensure the survival of the decaying pepper tree mentioned above

== Heritage listing ==
As at 16 May 2016, Macquarie Field House is of state and national heritage significance as one of the finest examples of early Australian residential architecture and a landmark, carefully sited in an intact 19th Century rural cultural landscape.

The house is a fine sandstone Regency dwelling built c.1838–40 by Samuel Terry and represents the final flowering of the Australian colonial country house style, symmetrical in plan, bold in mass and outline, possessing qualities of simplicity, unity and repose, tempered with a refinement of detail and a careful control in the disposition of the various elements in the design.

The property has considerable historical, architectural and archaeological significance as the site of the estate of three well known colonial figures* and for its associations with an early period of colonial history. (*James Meehan, ex-convict who became Deputy Surveyor General and surveyed much of the land south of Sydney between 1810 and 1820, and then of Samuel Terry, ex-convict, "Botany Bay millionaire" for his daughter and her husband John Hosking, the first elected Mayor of Sydney).

The complex has regional aesthetic significance as its siting closely relates to the surrounding landscape, being a landmark on a prominent hilltop amidst along undulating ridge of high land, surrounded by mature trees, and commanding expensive views to the south and west. This siting demonstrates the Australian nineteenth century fashion for picturesque country estate development which followed the eighteenth century English landscape tradition, and its corresponding attention to lands ape siting and moulding and the cultivation of a "prospect". It also demonstrates the distinctive lifestyle of the early nineteenth century County of Cumberland settler, including their deliberate moulding of the landscape's appearance.

While the detail of the early Arcadian style garden has been eroded, the remainder of Meehan's original 1810 land grant, plantings of mature Araucarias, pepper trees, African olives and oleanders and the open rural cultural landscape surrounding the estate are relatively intact today, adding to the significance of the property.

Specific remains identified on site to date include Meehan's Farm House or 'Castle' (1806–10), the Barn which was reputedly built or supervised by Government Architect Francis Greenway, of significance for its interesting architectural form and possible early use as a fortified barn and associated relics such as a wall along the southern side of the house, an early rubbish dump, two early wells, a possible early school house, possible remains of the flour mill and water race erected on the Bunbury Curran Creek. (Draft Statement of Significance, Jan 1999, Heritage Office)

The garden has largely been re-formed and has lost its detail but its importance is its wider landscape quality, the overall effect of its impressive dense, rich planting on its dominant hill-top site. It is an important link in the chain of "Cowpasture" gardens – the gardens of the large mid 19th century homesteads of the county of Cumberland distinctively planted with olives, oleanders, araucarias etc. which still punctuate the landscape of the outer south-western Sydney region. The garden alcove, although in ruins, is a rare example in the colony of substantial garden architecture

Macquarie Fields House is of exceptional value as a substantial mid-19th century homestead, prominently sited, with important remnant plantings, layout and archaeological features including a rare example of an exedra garden alcove (below the house on the eastern slope capitalising on the wide views, built c. 1870s and on the site of an even earlier structure).

The Group has considerable value in the local area as a major visual and historical reference point. A contributing factor to this prominence is the juxtaposition of the homestead and landmark vegetation to the open rural landscape surrounding them.

The Group has value for its archaeological research potential and strong associations with various individuals prominent in the 19th century.

Macquarie Field House was listed on the New South Wales State Heritage Register on 2 April 1999.
