= James Meehan (surveyor) =

Irish-Australian explorer (1774–1826)

James Meahan
- Born: 1774; Kingdom of Ireland, British Empire
- Died: 21 April 1826 (aged 51–52); Macquarie Fields, Colony of New South Wales, British Empire
- Occupation: Surveying
- Years active: 1800 - 1822
- Known for: surveying

James Meehan (1774 – 21 April 1826) was an Irish Australian explorer and surveyor.

Meehan was born in Ireland, in Shinrone, County Offaly, in 1774. He was declared a rebel and given a life sentence in a trial after the Rebellion of 1798 and arrived in Australia on the Friendship in February 1800. He came under the assumed name James Mahon. He became an assistant to surveyor-general Charles Grimes and accompanied him on a number of expeditions. Meehan acted as assistant-surveyor while Grimes was absent for about three years. On Grimes' return in 1806 and in appreciation for his work, he was given a pardon for his political crimes. He developed a plan of Sydney in 1807 (which was later used as the basis for the Old Sydney Town theme park).

In 1812, he was sent to Tasmania to survey the land. His 1811 map of Hobart contains detailed information on the early settlement. Meehan was appointed deputy surveyor-general in 1818. It was around this time that he named the settlement of Goulburn after Henry Goulburn, the Under-Secretary for War and the Colonies.

He was a leader of the Catholic Church in Sydney, chairing the meeting in 1820 which began the raising of funds for a church. He was largely responsible for choosing the site, on which St Mary's Cathedral now stands.

== Legacy ==
- James Meehan Reserve in Dee Why, New South Wales is named after Meehan for his role in surveying the Northern Beaches area and giving Dee Why its name.
- James Meehan High School is named to commemorate Meehan's role in mapping and opening up the Macquarie Fields, New South Wales area.
- A statue of Meehan was placed in a niche on the Loftus Street facade of the Department of Lands building in November 2010.
- James Meehan Street, a road in Windsor
- James Meehan Way, a road in Macquarie Links
- Meehan Range, a prominent geographical feature of steep hills running parallel to the River Derwent on Hobart's eastern shore
- Meehan Street, a road in Matraville, New South Wales

== See also ==
- List of convicts transported to Australia
