= Edmondson Park =

- Suburb
- Interactive map of Edmondson Park
- Country: Australia
- State: New South Wales
- City: Sydney
- LGA: City of Liverpool
- Location: 39 km (24 mi) south-west of Sydney CBD

Government
  - State electorate: Macquarie Fields
  - Federal division: Werriwa
- Elevation: 67 m (220 ft)

Population
  - Total: 12,080 (2021 census)
- Postcode: 2174
Suburbs around Edmondson Park
Horningsea Park	Prestons	Casula
Leppington	Edmondson Park	Casula (Crossroads)
Denham Court	Bardia	Glenfield

Edmondson Park is a suburb in the South West of Sydney, in the state of New South Wales, Australia. Edmondson Park is located 39 kilometres from the Sydney central business district, in the local government area of the City of Liverpool.

Edmondson Park is part of the South West Growth Centre and is expected to see significant growth and development over the next 10 years.

== History ==
=== 1800s–1997: Early settlement and military use ===
Edmondson Park lies on the Cumberland Plain, originally home to the Darug, Dharawal, and Gundungurra Aboriginal language groups.

In the early years of settlement, parts of the Cumberland Plain were turned into pastoral holdings. Large estates were broken up during the 1860s due to stem rust, which disrupted the grain industry, leading to the popularity of dairying, timber, fruit, and wine production by locals instead. By the 1890s, the area was noted for its thick, timbered scrub and open woodlands.

A large section of Edmondson Park includes the former Ingleburn Army Camp north of Campbelltown Road, which was established during World War II in 1939. The site remained active during the Korean and Vietnam Wars and was used primarily for Reservist military functions following the abolition of conscription in 1972. The site was decommissioned in 1997, and part of it has been retained in the Ingleburn Military Heritage Precinct.

=== 1970–1976: Suburb name ===
Edmondson Park is named in honour of John Hurst Edmondson, who was awarded the first Australian Victoria Cross medal posthumously for outstanding leadership and bravery in World War II. A former local resident, he completed his training at Ingleburn Army Camp. The name "Edmondson" was first suggested by Gowan Flora MacDonald for the Denham Court estate, which includes the present-day suburbs of Edmondson Park and Denham Court. In November 1970, the NSW Geographical Names Board approved the name of "Edmondson Park".

=== 2005–present: Rezoning and urban development ===
The South West Priority Growth Area was established by the NSW Government in 2005 to plan for urban expansion on Sydney’s fringes. Edmondson Park was the first precinct planned and constructed in this area, with the suburb rezoned for development in May 2008.

A large part of the suburb, formerly part of the Ingleburn Army Camp, was purchased from the Department of Defence by Landcom, the NSW Government's land and property development organisation. The site spanned the two adjoining suburbs of Edmondson Park in the north and Bardia in the south, covering an area of 827 hectares. Landcom was responsible for the masterplan, development, and land release of the area, with the first residential lots sold in 2012. The mixed-use Edmondson Park Town Centre was delivered in partnership with Frasers Property Australia.

== Demographics ==
In the 2021 Census, there were 12,080 people in Edmondson Park, a significant increase from 2,271 in 2016. The most commonly reported ancestries were Indian 14.8%, Australian 10.9%, Chinese 8.2%, English 7.9%, and Nepalese 6.4%. 44.1% of people were born in Australia. The most common countries of birth were India 8.2%, Nepal, 4.7%, and Fiji 4.1%. 32.1% of people spoke only English at home. Other languages spoken at home included Hindi 10.7% and Arabic 4.7%. The most common responses for religion were Catholic 19.6%, Islam 19%, Hinduism 16.5%, and No Religion 12.6%.

== Commercial area ==
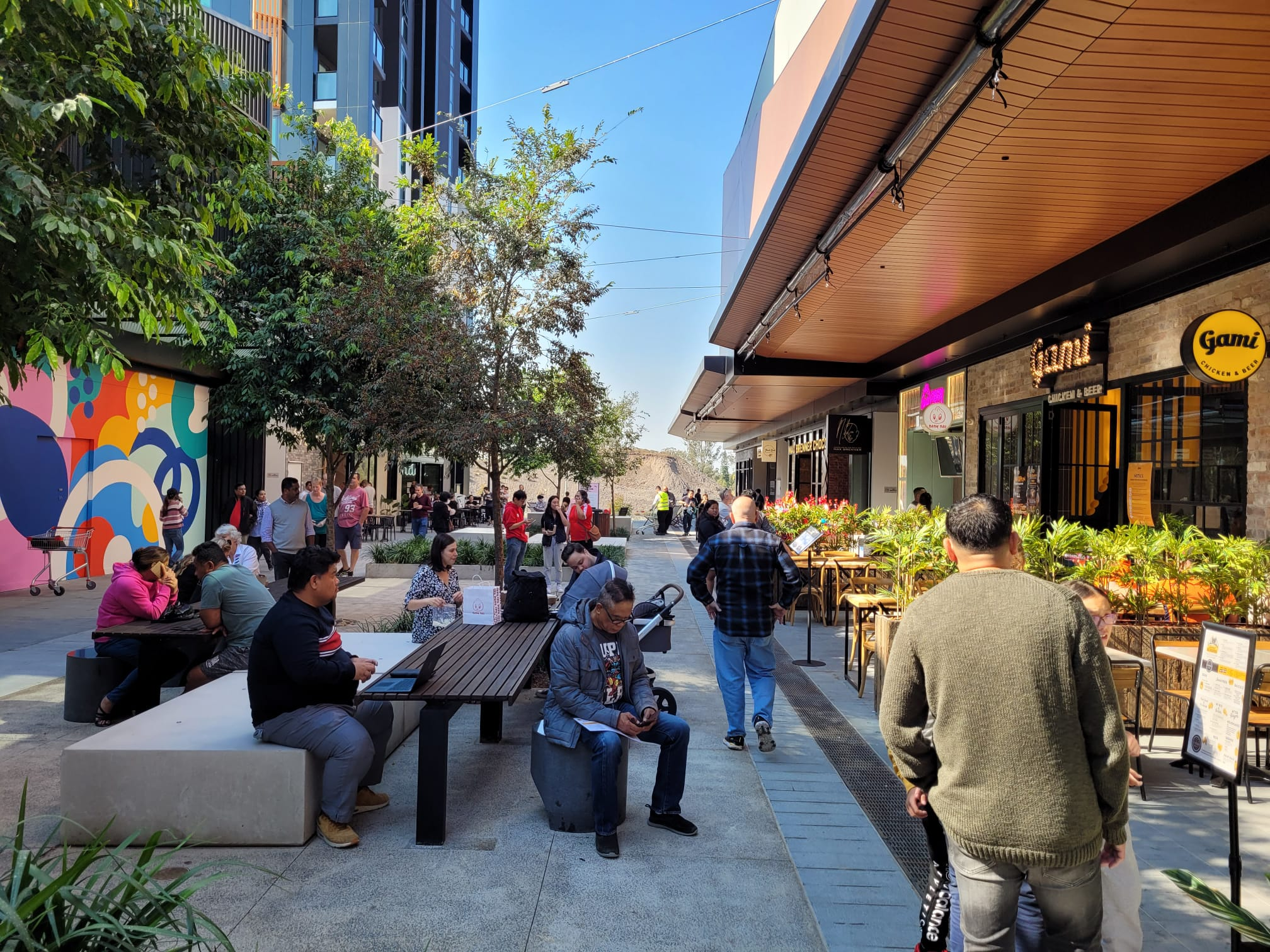
Eat Street in Ed Square Town Shopping Centre

The Ed. Square Town Shopping Centre is the main shopping area located adjacent to the Edmondson Park railway station. The shopping centre is located in the mixed-use town centre and includes Coles, Event Cinemas, and iPlay, as well as other shopping, entertainment, dining, and service stores. Several smaller distributed commercial sites are located on Camden Valley Way in the northern part of the suburb, including the Village Square Shopping Centre.

== Transport ==
The Edmondson Park railway station opened on 8 February 2015 and is on the South West Rail Link.

Transit Systems operates scheduled buses that connect the suburb with other areas in the south west, including Narellan, Carnes Hill, Casula, Ingleburn, and Liverpool. Interline also operates an On-Demand bus service within the suburb to the train station.

== Education ==
- St Francis Catholic College, K–12 Co-Educational Catholic College
- Edmondson Park Public School
- New high school in Edmondson Park (planned)
- Edmondson Park College (opening 2027)
