= Stone Cottage, Minto =

Historical homestead complex in New South Wales, Australia

Stone Cottage
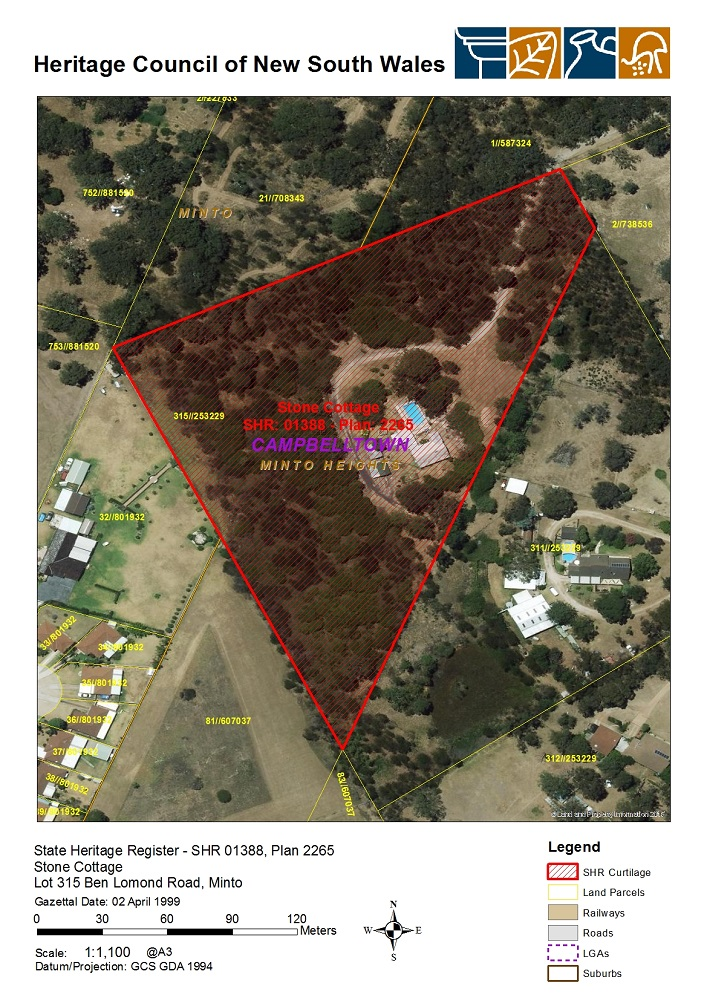
- Heritage boundaries

- Location within Sydney Location within Australia
- 34°02′27″S 150°51′30″E
- Location: Lot 315 Ben Lomond Road, Minto, City of Campbelltown, New South Wales, Australia

History
- Built: 1830

Site notes
- Architectural style: Georgian architecture
- Owner: Department of Planning and Infrastructure

New South Wales Heritage Register
- Type: State heritage (built)
- Designated: 2 April 1999
- Reference no.: 1388
- Type: Homestead Complex
- Category: Farming, grazing

Stone Cottage is a heritage-listed homestead complex located at 315 Ben Lomond Road in the Sydney suburb of Minto, New South Wales, Australia. Designed and built in 1830, it originally laid within Campbellfield estate, the six thousand acres of land owned by William Redfern, much of which makes up present-day Minto. Dr Redfern used this land for farming and cattle grazing, along with establishing vineyards, bringing Portuguese vinedressers to Sydney after his travels to Madeira. The property is owned by the New South Wales Department of Planning and Infrastructure. It was added to the New South Wales State Heritage Register on 2 April 1999.

== History ==
The cottage is believed to have been used for farm hands working at Campbellfield for Dr William Redfern. Dr Redfern lived at Campbellfield from about 1818–1828. During its history, one vendor of the property is recorded as W. L. M. Redfern, Dr Redfern's son.

The house was purchased by Mr & Mrs Briggs in 1949 with 9 hectares (22.5 acres). Prior to that it had not been occupied for about ten years.

The present occupant was told that the building was originally occupied by a convict overseer and a number of convicts, which may explain why one room was not internally connected to the other two rooms.

== Description ==
A stone cottage of three rooms, each 5 metres (15 ft) by 4 metres (12.5 ft). It is built of sandstone with two three-hundred-and-five-millimetre (one-foot) foot thick cavity walls, painted outside. According to locals, a narrow doorway into the bedroom was associated with an illicit still. The western room is only accessible from outside. There is a verandah to the front of the building and a 1950s timber addition to the rear. The external walls were painted in 1997.

=== Condition ===
As at 26 March 1999, the house has been generally well maintained, however there is a large crack in the sandstone of the eastern wall above the fuse box. There are also several cracks in the western wall and the front facade.

The Stone Cottage appears to be relatively intact, although it has undergone some recent minor alterations.

=== Modifications and dates ===
The previous owners restored the house, keeping all the original door and window openings and the double fireplaces. Rooms have been added to the rear of the property, and the garden re-done. All the inside walls have been whitewashed, and the external walls were painted by the department in 1997.

== Heritage listing ==
The cottage was added to the New South Wales State Heritage Register on 2 April 1999, having satisfied the criteria. The State Heritage Register deemed the ancillary building of 'high significance' due to its association with the use of convict labour, along with the agricultural development of the Macarthur region. In addition, the State Heritage Register noted it had technical and research significance due to being an example of colonial building techniques.

== See also ==
- Australian residential architectural styles
