= Bardia, New South Wales =

Bardia
- Suburb
- Interactive map of Bardia
- Coordinates: 33°58′37.2″S 150°51′43.2″E
- Country: Australia
- State: New South Wales
- City: Sydney
- LGAs: Campbelltown; Liverpool
- Location: 44 km (27 mi) south-west of Sydney CBD
- Established: 18 December 2009

Government
  - State electorate: Macquarie Fields
  - Federal divisions: Hughes; Macarthur
- Elevation: 70 m (230 ft)

Population
  - Total: 5,747 (2021 census)
- Postcode: 2565
Suburbs around Bardia
Denham Court	Edmondson Park	Glenfield
Denham Court	Bardia	Macquarie Links
Denham Court	Ingleburn	Macquarie Links

Bardia is a suburb of Sydney, in the state of New South Wales, Australia, located 44 kilometres south-west of the Sydney central business district, between Campbelltown and Liverpool. It is part of the Macarthur region.

== History ==
The suburb got its name from the "Bardia Barracks" at Ingleburn which were named in honour of the successful engagement of the local 16th division in the Battle of Bardia, the first Australian action in World War II. Bardia was gazetted as a suburb on 18 December 2009. Some street names serve in honour of soldiers or the brave men who fought in war. E.g. Ray Simpson Avenue.

== Education ==
There is one public school in the area. Bardia Public School, which was renamed from Ingleburn North Public School on 5 May 2015, is located on MacDonald Road. It also has a local daycare.
