= Long Point, New South Wales =

Long Point
- Suburb
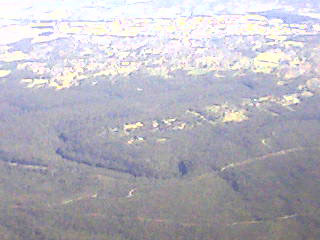
- Aerial view (looking west) of Long Point and Ingleburn.

- Interactive map of Long Point
- Coordinates: 34°0′43″S 150°53′49″E
- Country: Australia
- State: New South Wales
- City: Sydney
- LGA: City of Campbelltown
- Location: 46 km (29 mi) south-west of Sydney
- Established: 1975

Government
  - State electorate: Macquarie Fields
  - Federal division: Hughes

Population
  - Total: 173 (2021 census)
- Postcode: 2564
Suburbs around Long Point
Macquarie Fields	Macquarie Fields	Holsworthy
Ingleburn	Long Point	Holsworthy
Ingleburn	Holsworthy	Holsworthy

Note: There are several other locations in New South Wales also called Long Point.

Long Point is a suburb of Sydney, in the state of New South Wales, Australia. Long Point is located 46 kilometres south-west of the Sydney central business district, in the local government area of the City of Campbelltown.

== History ==
Situated on a bend in the Georges River, this area was long known as Long Point, Long Nose Point or just The Point until formally being dubbed Long Point in 1975. The land was first granted to settler Thomas Mills in the early 19th century before being consumed by William Redfern's Campbellfields Estate a few years later. Later it was considered part of Macquarie Fields. In the 1930s high-profile gangsters from East Sydney would use small houses set up in Long Point bushland as hiding places from the law.

Sand was mined in the area for a number of years and once mining work was completed, access trails were preserved for the fire brigade. It was preserved as a Scenic Protection Area in the 1970s by Campbelltown Council.

== Recreation ==
Long Point is a scenic protection neighbourhood. The area now has a camping site that accommodates up to 120 people. The area also contains a Coptic Orthodox Church.

== Wildlife ==
Numerous koala sightings have been made in Long Point. These are regularly reported in the local newspaper the Macarthur Advertiser in the Mac Koala column. The area has been referred to as "death adder valley" due to the large population of death adder snakes in the area. There have been many incidents with snakes biting people in this area and it has been advised by the local government to avoid this particular camping spot.
