= Bardia (disambiguation) =

Bardia is a town in Libya.

Bardia may also refer to:

- Bardia (Nepal), a region of Nepal
- Bardia, New South Wales, a suburb of Sydney

== See also ==
- Battle of Bardia, fought in this town 3 to 5 January 1941
- Bardiya (disambiguation)
