= Minto, New South Wales =

Minto
- Suburb
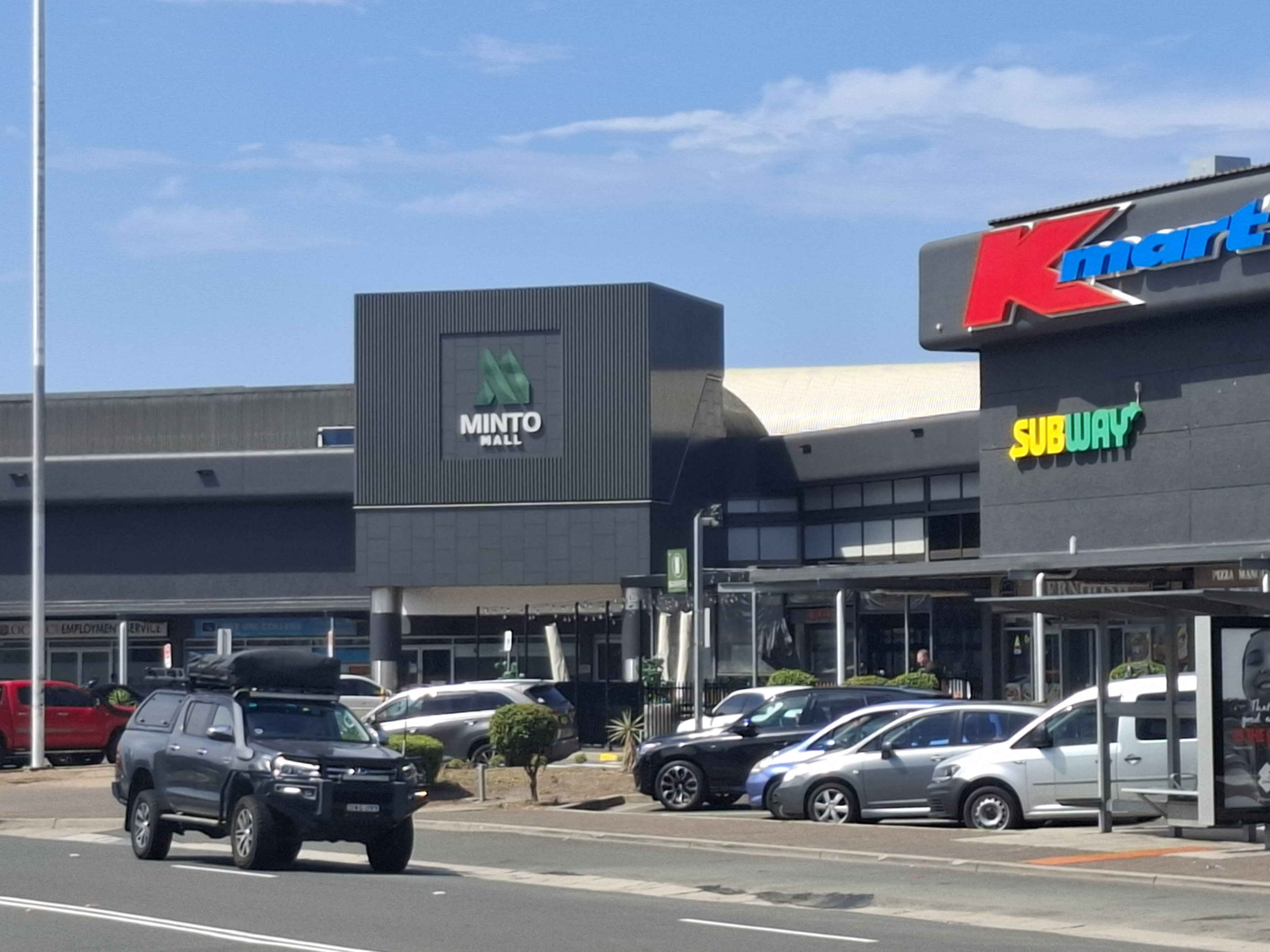
- The Minto Mall, the central shopping centre of the suburb after renovations, pictured in 2025

- Interactive map of Minto
- Country: Australia
- State: New South Wales
- City: Sydney
- LGA: City of Campbelltown
- Location: 50 km (31 mi) SW of Sydney
- Established: 1882

Government
  - State electorate: Macquarie Fields
  - Federal division: Werriwa
- Elevation: 70 m (230 ft)

Population
  - Total: 13,940 (2021 census)
- Postcode: 2566
Suburbs around Minto
Ingleburn	Ingleburn	Ingleburn
Bow Bowing	Minto	Minto Heights
Woodbine	Leumeah	Kentlyn

Minto is a suburb of Sydney, in the state of New South Wales, Australia. Minto is located 50 kilometres south-west of the Sydney central business district, in the local government area of the City of Campbelltown and is part of the Macarthur region.

The suburb is often nicknamed "Mino" by locals, based on the Australian English dialect spoken in the area.

== History ==
Minto was named in honour of the Earl of Minto, Gilbert Elliot-Murray-Kynynmound, who was Viceroy of India from 1807 to 1814. The name was originally given to the entire district stretching from just north of Appin up to what is now Denham Court.

The area that constitutes the current suburb of Minto was originally home to the indigenous Tharawal people until the arrival of European settlers from the First Fleet. In 1811, Governor Lachlan Macquarie granted 800 acres (3.2 km^{2}) in the area to William Redfern, the colony's first surgeon. He in turn named it Campbellfield after Macquarie's wife Elizabeth whose maiden name was Campbell. Redfern used the property as a vineyard and sheep station.

In 1810, Dr Robert Towson built his sandstock home, Varroville, in St Andrews Road, on land granted by Governor Macquarie. The house was subsequently owned by Charles Sturt and James Raymond, the first Postmaster General. In the 1820s, Colonel Parker built a Georgian bungalow called Epping Forest in Raby Road. A farm called Robin Hood Farm was built in Campbelltown Road circa 1830. These three properties are now listed on the Register of the National Estate.

In 1874, a railway station was built in the area and named Campbellfield after the property but this led to confusion with nearby Campbelltown so in 1882, it was renamed Minto. Development of the area followed shortly after and by the 1950s it was a village of around 500 people.

A large slice of land on the east side of Minto was sold to Housing Commission in 1969 to provide cheap housing. Shortly after a large industrial estate was also established in the area and Minto's transition from village to Sydney suburb was complete.

== Heritage listings ==
Minto has a number of heritage-listed sites, including:

- Lot 315 Ben Lomond Road: Stone Cottage, Minto

== Transport ==
Minto railway station is on the Main Southern railway line. Minto also has a small inland port connected by rail to Port Botany. The inland port consists of a single rail siding with an adjacent hard stand surface for the containers, and the siding is operated by top and tail trains with engines at both ends.

== Retail ==
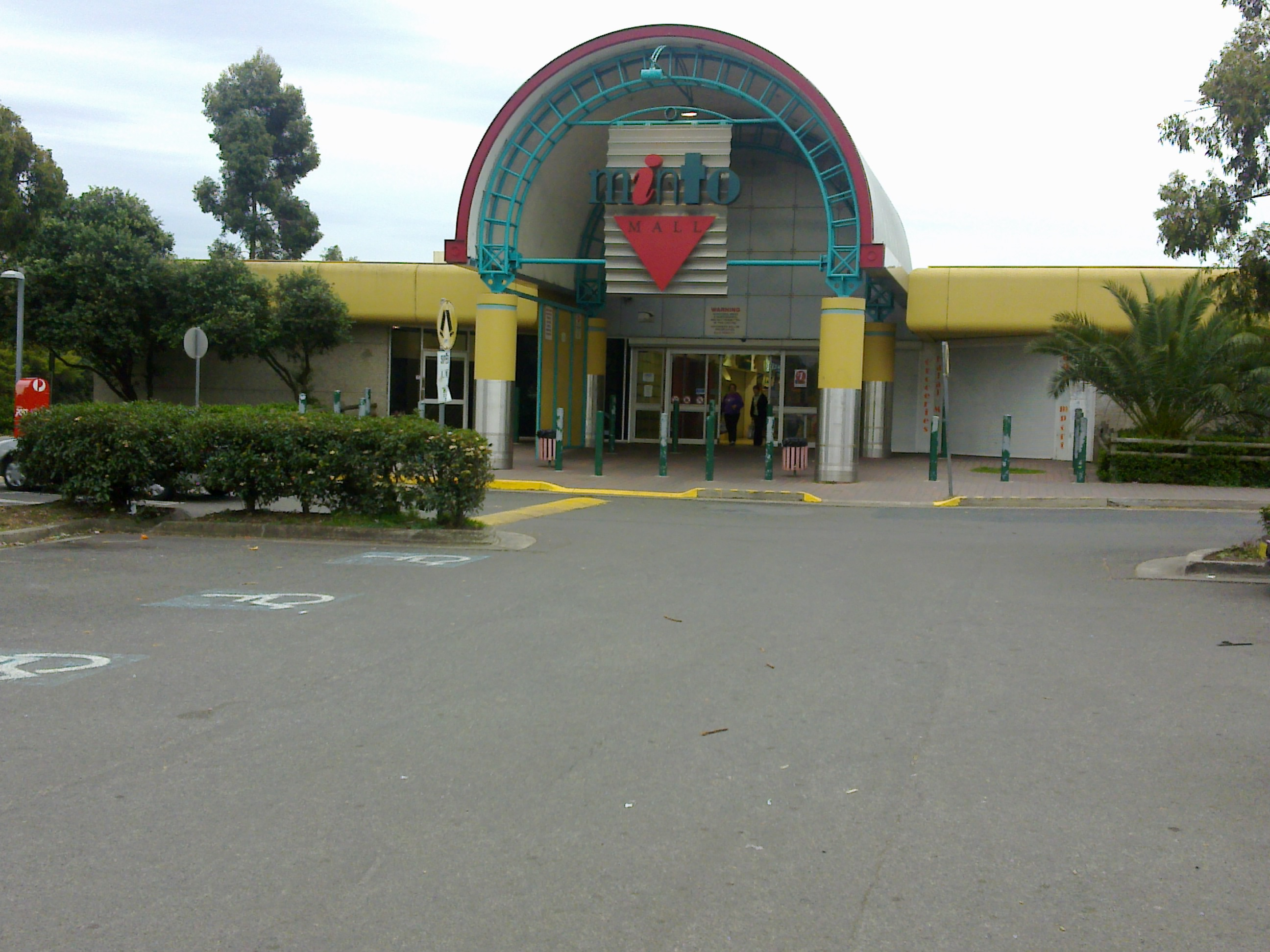
The entrance to Minto Mall prior to renovations

Minto has received negative publicity on two occasions because of its local shopping centre, the Minto Mall, which has been investigated twice on the news program A Current Affair. After being placed under pressure by A Current Affair and members of the community due to the rundown state of the mall, Minto Mall sold in late 2012.

Since 2014, the former Minto Mall has fully reopened and refurbished as Minto Marketplace. It is now populated by major retailers such as Woolworths and Kmart. The centre was renamed back to the Minto Mall following another modernisation effort.

== Schools ==
Minto is home to two high schools, Sarah Redfern High and Alfaisal College; five primary schools, Campbellfield Public, Minto Public, Sarah Redfern Public, The Grange Public and Alfaisal College; and a special school, Passfield Park, which services disabled students from pre-school through to high school.

Rugby League player Lelea Paea attended Sarah Redfern High School.

== Housing ==
Public housing belonging to Housing NSW has recently been demolished in the suburb new housing estate called One Minto. This decision had been made in an attempt to break the generational cycle of a socially disadvantaged suburb that the Minto estate had infamously been known for over the past few decades. Because of this concentration of disadvantage, the One Minto Estate experienced a range of social issues including high unemployment and poor health, low income, high percentage of single parent families, a lack of access to educational opportunities and other services and high crime rates. The majority of the houses will be private with around 850 privately owned houses compared to only 360 public housing homes. The public housing has been evenly spread among the suburb, in efforts to prevent concentrated areas of welfare dependency.

Although the One Minto estate sits at approximately 30 percent public housing, the suburb as a whole has 15 percent in total.

== Demographics ==
At the 2021 census, the population of Minto was 13,940.

- Aboriginal and Torres Strait Islander people made up 3.1% of the population.
- 49.0% of people were born in Australia. The most common countries of birth were Bangladesh 8.8%, India 5.4%, Nepal 4.7%, Philippines 3.4% and New Zealand 3.1%. There is also a small Iraqi origin population.
- 41.7% of people only spoke English at home. Other languages spoken at home included Bengali 12.6%, Nepali 5.7%, Hindi 3.7%, Arabic 3.4% and Urdu 3.0%.
- The most common responses for religion were Islam 22.3%, Catholic 16.1%, No Religion 15.7%, Hinduism 12.6% and Not stated 7.2%.
- The median weekly household income was $1,646, lower than the national median of $1,746.

At the 2016 census, there were 12,551 people in Minto.

== Notable residents ==
- Raymond Martin (canoeist), Australian Olympic sprint canoeist and foundational principal of St Vincent's College Ashfield
- Rugby league players Israel Folau, Jarryd Hayne and Krisnan Inu all grew up within a few blocks of each other in Minto and played park football together
- Member of the Parliament of New South Wales and former Housing Minister Cherie Burton grew up in Minto

== Sport and recreation ==
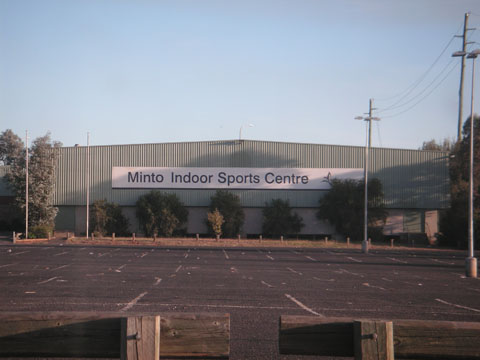
Minto Sports Centre

The Minto Indoor Sports Centre is home to local basketball and netball teams. The Macarthur Heat plays in the New South Wales State Basketball League and uses the centre as its home court. The Campbelltown District Netball Association, which is also based at the centre, plays in the third division of the Netball NSW State League.

Minto has a rugby league team, the Minto Cobras playing in the Western Suburbs District Junior Rugby League. The Cobras home ground is Townson Oval. They have produced a number of NRL players including Israel Folau, Michael Lett, Gray Vaine, Justin Brooker, John Skandalis, Ken McGuinness, Kevin McGuinness, Jarryd Hayne, and Krisnan Inu.
