= James Meehan High School =

Location
- Macquarie Fields, South Western Sydney, New South Wales; Australia; 33°59′17″S 150°53′32″E

Information
- Type: Government-funded co-educational secondary day school
- Established: 1975; 51 years ago
- Educational authority: New South Wales Department of Education
- Principal: Tim Bordado
- Years: 7-12
- Accreditation: New South Wales Education Standards Authority
- Website: jamesmeeha-h.schools.nsw.gov.au

James Meehan High School is a government-funded co-educational secondary day school, located at 58 Harold Street, Macquarie Fields, a south-western suburb of Sydney, New South Wales, Australia.

Established in 1975, the school caters to students in Year 7 to Year 12; and is operated by the New South Wales Department of Education.

== Overview ==
The school serves the Macquarie Fields community. The student population ranges from 11 to 19 years old. The school provides a broad curriculum based on the requirements of the New South Wales Education Standards Authority that lead to the award of the NSW Higher School Certificate.

The school is named in honour of James Meehan, a former convict and colonial government surveyor who was instrumental in opening and mapping the area in the 19th century.

== See also ==
- List of government schools in New South Wales
- Education in Australia
