= Ingleburn Military Heritage Precinct and Mont St Quentin Oval =

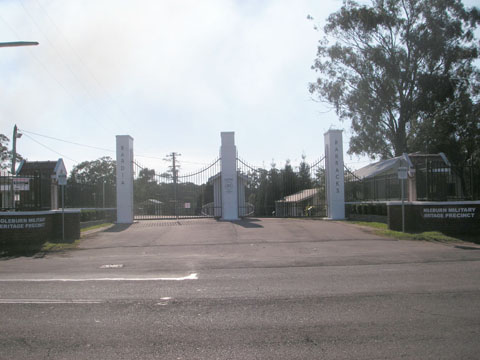

- Location within Sydney Location within Australia
- 33.9768°S 150.8532°E
- Location: Campbelltown Road, Ingleburn, Sydney, New South Wales, Australia

History
- Built: 1939–1998

Site notes
- Owner: Landcom

New South Wales Heritage Register
- Official name: Ingleburn Military Heritage Precinct and Mont St Quentin Oval; Ingleburn Army Camp
- Type: state heritage (complex / group)
- Designated: 15 March 2013
- Reference no.: 1891
- Type: Defence Base Army
- Category: Defence

Ingleburn Military Heritage Precinct and Mont St Quentin Oval is a heritage-listed conservation area at the site of the former Ingleburn Army Camp at Campbelltown Road, Ingleburn, Sydney, New South Wales, Australia. The heritage buildings on site were built from 1939. It was added to the New South Wales State Heritage Register on 15 March 2013.

== History ==
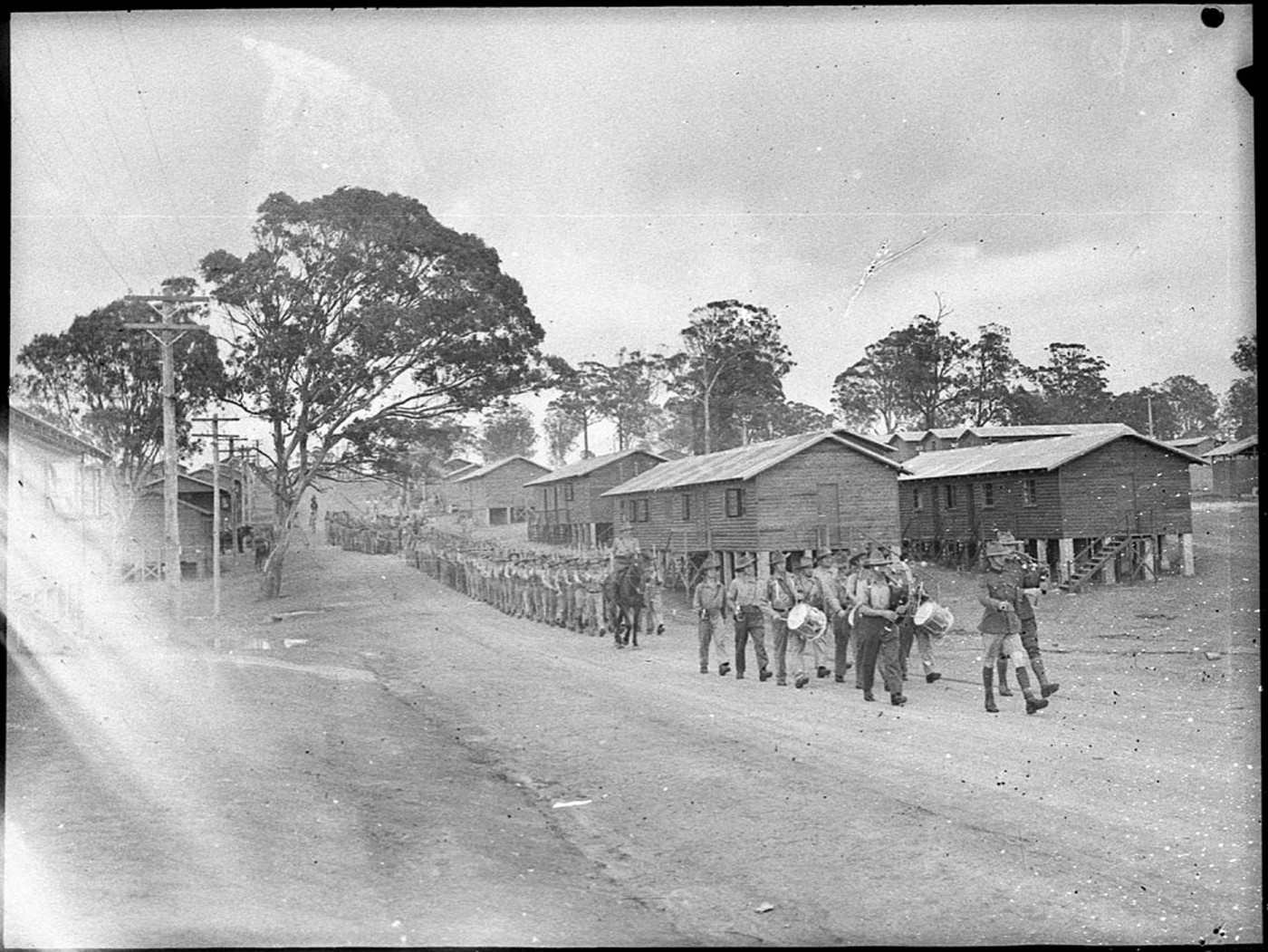
Military camp, Ingleburn, 1939

The Military Heritage Precinct and Mont St Quentin Oval is part of the former Defence Site which was originally established in 1939 on 276.8 ha of land. The Defence site expanded to cover an area 311 ha during its use as a Defence site.

=== The Ingleburn Defence Site ===
The majority of the land on which the Ingleburn Defence site was located was first granted to the first colonial surveyor, James Meeham by Governor Macquarie in the 1816. The estate, then named "Macquarie Fields", was purchased by Samuel Terry in 1831. Terry added to the estate which remained in the Terry family until 1877. At this time the land was subdivided with the largest land parcel, which later contained part of the Defence site, being purchased by James Ashcroft. Subsequently, the intact estate was purchased by member of the New South Wales Legislative Assembly Alexander Ross in 1904 and was subdivided into two land parcels in 1917. The parcel which later contained the Defence site remained in the Ross family and was purchased by Frederick Moore in 1927. Moore added land to the estate and then subdivided it into a mix of small town allotments, small farm allotments and larger parcels of about 100 acres. By 1939 only a few of the allotments had been sold off.

The onset of hostilities in Europe in 1939 and Australia's entry into World War II in September 1939 instigated the rapid expansion of both the Permanent Military Forces and the Citizens Military Forces, (CMF). From September 1939 volunteers from the CMF began their one-month training for service in Australia and its Territories and another 20,000 volunteers formed the Second Australian Infantry Force. This expansion and the introduction of universal conscription requiring all single men of 21 years of age to undergo military training in preparation for active service created the need to establish a significant network of military training facilities. The Liverpool site, where army training occurred during World War II, was inadequate for the additional training required by the increasingly technological nature of warfare in preparation for WWII. It was the recognition of these factors that led to the identification and establishment of the Ingleburn Defence Site as suitable and plans were drawn up for the site in 1939.

The 276.8 hectare parcel of land at Ingleburn was selected as the site for the first purpose built army training defence site in Australia. The land was acquired by compulsory resumption, formally gazetted in May 1940, yet the camp received its first recruits on 1 November 1939, long before the 333 buildings comprising the WWII training facility were completed. The facilities constructed included barrack accommodation, officers' quarters, mess halls, Sergeant's offices and mess, Officers mess, ablution blocks, latrines, administration offices, transport facilities. The sleeping barracks, mess halls and offices were usually P1 type wooden huts.

Recruits arriving at Ingleburn received basic training and further specialised training. At Ingleburn they were trained to work as a battalion which was followed by training at Liverpool, to work as a company. Ingleburn Defence Site also played a major role in the formation of military units, prior to their dispatch to active service during WWII. It was here at Ingleburn that the first troops to see active service in WWII, the 16th Brigade of the 6th division of the Second AIF, was formed. On 3 January 1941, the Australian forces broke the defences of the Italian forces at the Battle of Bardia. The town of Bardia fell to the Australians 2 days later. Thousands of prisoners of War were taken as well as valuable supplies. Another Battalion of noted service during WWII to have formed at Ingleburn was the 2/13th Battalion known as "The devils own" because of their involvement in the eight month Siege of Tobruk. These are only 2 of the units to have seen distinguished active service which formed at Ingleburn during WWII.

The Mont St Quentin Oval was initially used as the main parade ground for the Ingleburn Army Camp prior to the establishment of more parade grounds around the Defence site. It was also initially the place troops were officially farewelled on their dispatch overseas and also the place they were welcomed back on their return from active service. It was from Ingleburn that many troops were demobilised.

In 1941 with the establishment of the Australian Women's Army Service, Ingleburn expanded its training role to train female recruits. Women between the ages of 18 and 45 years trained in auxiliary roles such as drivers (military vehicles including 3-ton trucks), orderlies and in clerical positions. In addition to this Ingleburn was the site of the First Field Hospital an adjunct of which, the central military hospital provided training and an assembly point for field medical units.

At the end of WWII, the frenetic war time activity at the Ingleburn Defence Site abated and some land was leased out to local farmers. Nevertheless, the site still retained a military function becoming the home of the 1st Battalion Royal Australian Regiment. It was later home to the 4th and the 3rd Battalion Royal Australian Regiment.

The role of Ingleburn Army Camp as a training facility and in forming military units for overseas service was boosted with Australia's involvement in the Korean War from 1951 to 1953. Battalions bound for Korea were stationed at Ingleburn. One of the most marked changes to the site at this time was the introduction of housing for married personnel in areas set out as villages or suburbs. Bardia and Block H (later Valley View) villages were established on the Ingleburn Defence Site at this time. On the initiative of a number of servicemen's wives, a creche was set up and allocated one of the P1 type huts for their activities. Originally, residents from the barracks had to travel to Campbelltown or Liverpool to shop necessitating a trip of over an hour. This was the motivation for establishing the Bambi creche. It initially offered 4 morning and 5 afternoon sessions per week. Since its establishment it has grown with the addition of two more huts and has become a fully accredited childcare service offering services to the defence community and later the broader community.

Also in 1951, Ingleburn became a major centre for training for recruits of the reintroduced compulsory National Service scheme. This coupled with the Korean War activities, led to the expansion and development of the site and by the 1960s facilities included sporting fields, vehicle parks, a substantial recreation and training facility for the National Service men comprising 3 Romney Huts modified and assembled around a courtyard and much attention to landscaping of the camp with the planting of local and introduced species.

Training of National Service men remained a dominant role through the 1950s, when national servicemen were not required to serve overseas but provided a home defence and through the 1960s, when this policy changed and conscripts were expected to serve in the Vietnam War. It was during this latter period that Ingleburn became associated with the anti war movement as many conscientious objectors were locked up in the Bardia guard house and cell block before being transported to the Military Prison at Holsworthy. In 1972 National Service was abolished thus ending Ingleburn's role in training for national servicemen. From 1973 to 1998 the Ingleburn Defence Site was a place of training for the largest troop of the Australian Army Reserve. In addition, during the 1970s it housed the Military Police.

From 1990 when 93 ha to the north of the site was sold to Landcom, the military uses of the site were wound down and vacant buildings sold or demolished. The site was vacated by the end of 2000.

=== Military Heritage Precinct ===
The Military Heritage Precinct was established in 2002 by Defence as a national memorial providing a focus for memorial and commemoration days, catering for private visits and community use. It conserves a selection of representative examples of buildings and memorials of significance.

The establishment of the Military Heritage Precinct was a means of consolidating some of the remaining heritage assets on the site into one area. It contains memorials, the guard house and cell blocks, the former Chaplain's and Post Offices and three P1 huts, the gate house and three P1 type huts.

The huts which were constructed in the 1950s for the Chaplain's Office and former military Post Office facilities are associated with the Korean War. The three earlier (1939-1945) P1 huts are examples of the style that provided the barracks accommodation and also administrative buildings. Of the three earlier barrack huts remaining in the Military Heritage Precinct, one is now used as a museum. The museum hut is a replacement for a similar hut which was in particularly poor condition.

Several of the early buildings from the establishment period still stand at Ingleburn remain in the Military Heritage Precinct. The formal entrance gates with two brick sentry posts, small check point hut immediately behind the gates and a main guard house were constructed early in the war, certainly by 1942. The cell block located behind the guard house and containing ten cells was a later addition in 1949.

=== Memorials ===
The Military Heritage Precinct has several relocated memorials to those who served at the military base. A "Memorial Grove" of commemorative pine plantings was dedicated in 1987. Originally located outside the precinct, they were relocated there in 2002. It included a commemorative garden surrounding a rectangular sandstone column with a brass plaque commemorating members of Bardia Barracks who died while on posting at that location.

A memorial grove of pine planting was dedicated in 1987. A memorial to National Servicemen was inaugurated in 1997 and is the focus of ongoing annual commemorative celebrations. A memorial wall built in 2002 commemorates all infantry and training groups posted to Bardia Barracks. A paved area in the form of the "Rising Sun" badge along with plinth and flag poles serves as a memorial to the 16th Brigade which first assembled at Ingleburn in November 1939 and which went on to serve with distinction in the Middle East, Greece and Papua New Guinea, Crete, Syria, and Libya.

The most recent addition to the Military Heritage Precinct is a concrete statue in the form of a soldier, shown resting on arms reversed, which was moved from the closed Lakemba Returned Soldiers' Club to Ingleburn in 2008. It was originally unveiled in 1923.

The former Chaplain's Office at the Military Heritage Precinct is used for educational purposes, especially for visiting schools, and for meeting purposes. The former military Post Office is likewise used for visitors and the National Servicemen's Association members involved with maintaining and developing the memorial nature of the precinct.

=== Mont St Quentin Oval ===
The Mont St Quentin Oval is now considered to be closely associated with the Military Heritage Precinct. The Oval was a sports field prior to the establishment of the Ingleburn Defence Site and was initially used as the first parade ground on the Defence Site. Its use as a parade ground ceased as formal parade grounds were established on the site and it became a recreation oval for the Defence Site. The hospital entry posts from the former First Field Hospital at the Ingleburn Defence Site were relocated to stand at the oval after the demolition of the hospital in 1997.

== Description ==
The Military Heritage Precinct was established in 2002 to conserve and represent the major heritage values of the larger former Ingleburn Defence Site. The precinct is enclosed by a green metal palisade fence and service road and the boundary incorporates the original white masonry gateposts and guard posts of the Bardia Barracks (the former name of this part of the Ingleburn Defence Site).

The formal entrance gates form a large part of the southern perimeter of the precinct and include two sentry boxes of red brick, painted white internally, with white bargeboards and terracotta tiled gable roofs. An original guard station located behind the central masonry column of the entrance gates is a timber framed, weatherboard structure with a corrugated iron gable roof of corrugated iron. The gates are constructed of three white painted masonry pillars (approximately 4m tall) with embossed lettering "BARDIA" running vertically down the west column and "BARRACKS" down the east column. The entrance driveway is lined with a redbrick dwarf wall to either side. Small stone walls form part of the driveway and are located on either side of the entrance between the sentry boxes and entry gates. Manicured ornamental plantings sit in planter boxes behind the stone walls

=== Elements within the precinct ===
==== Memorials ====
Five memorials have been relocated in the Military Heritage Precinct of which the most imposing is the memorial wall, located west of the guard house. This memorial was constructed concurrently with the establishment of the precinct and is in memory of all infantry and training groups that were posted to the Defence site. This memorial is a sloping, semicircular rendered concrete wall with a central flagpole and granite base. The interior of the wall is lined by marble plaques citing the names of all units identified as having served at the Defence site.

North west of the entrance stands the 16th Australian Infantry Brigade memorial. It consists of six flagpoles and, in plan view, the concrete base of the memorial is shaped like the rising sun reflecting the Australian Army badge. This is an elaborate monument comprising a rectangular concrete slab set on a concrete plinth, with an inscription stone attached to its south face. The stone is inscribed in black lettering and records the Battle Honours of the unit from 1940 to 1945.

The official National Servicemen's Memorial is located east of two of the P1 type huts. This memorial is the focus of commemorative celebrations such as Bardia Day, an annual event at the site usually held in the first week in August. It is surrounded by five flagpoles set in a semicircle around the monument at a radius of about 3m and has a central white brick plinth on which a large stone, inlaid with a plaque, is placed. Small box planter beds are located on either side of this central stone.

The Memorial Grove, dedicated in 1987, is located in the north east section of the site. It includes commemorative pine plantings which surround a rectangular sandstone column. The monument includes a brass plaque bearing the names of soldiers who were killed in training at the Bardia Barracks

The most recent addition to the precinct is the concrete soldier, which was relocated to the precinct in 2008. There are also three decommissioned Army guns located within the precinct, a Gofors antiaircraft gun and two artillery guns, a 25-pounder and a howitzer.

Interpretive signage has been installed in the precinct to explain the history of the precinct and its elements.

==== Guard House ====
The guard house and its cell block are located adjacent to the entrance gates. The guardhouse was constructed in 1939 and is currently used as a kitchenette and breakout area for the 24 hour security presence on the site. It is a timber framed, weatherboard clad building with a corrugated iron hipped roof. A verandah supported by timber posts is located at the front of the building which is painted cream and has a green corrugated hipped roof with a verandah extension. The building has been updated incrementally, with minor additions such as aluminium windows and upgrades to internal services.

==== Cell Block ====
The cell block is a later addition to the guard house and contains a concrete exercise yard. Constructed in 1949, the building features heavy timber doors to each of the 10 cells which retain their original configuration.

==== Former Chaplains Office ====
The former Chaplains Office is a weatherboard clad structure, slightly elevated from the ground, with a fairly new corrugated metal roof. The single roomed building retains it original windows and doors. Air conditioning units have recently been added to allow the building to be used for educational purposes and as a meeting room.

==== Former Military Post Office ====
The former military Post Office is a converted P1 type hut dating from the period between 1950 and 1959. It has a skillion verandah extension to the gabled, corrugated iron roof. It comprises a single room and is externally clad with weatherboard. There are several timber bench seats attached to the facade and concrete and metal disabled access ramps have recently been added and a small barbecue shelter has been constructed between this building and the car parking area.

==== P1 Type Huts ====
There are three almost identical P1 type huts located in the north west corner of the precinct. They are located in an arrangement and painted in identical colour schemes of cream and mission brown with new grey corrugated metal roofs. These huts were retained in the precinct as representative examples and to conserve their heritage values as a building type. For the purpose of their heritage listing the huts are referred to as Huts 1, 2 and 3.

P1 type Huts 2 and 3 date from the period 1939 - 1946 and feature entry doors at each end of the building and three casement paned windows. These huts have a triangular lattice vent below the gable at each end of the building. Internally the huts are of a simple rectangular floor plan. Hut 3 is currently used as a museum for educational tours and open days . Displays include a mock soldiers bed and kit as well as military uniforms, photographs and other paraphernalia. There have been no major alterations to this building.

Hut 1 is a P1 type hut dating form the period 1950 - 1956. This more recent style hut contains double hung windows, overlapping weatherboards and a small rectangular louvered gable vent. The entrance doors are located on the side of the building. Hut 1 and 2 are currently used for storage.

==== Mont St Quentin Oval ====
The Mont St Quentin Oval is located on the opposite side of Campbelltown Road to the Military Heritage Precinct and is currently managed as part of the Military Heritage Precinct. The entrance to the oval is marked by the original oval gate posts. The road entrance is now marked by the former hospital gates, relocated to the precinct from the First Field Hospital which was demolished in 1997. The Oval retains the viewing dais and parade ground steps associated with its use as a parade ground during WWII.

=== Condition ===
The guard house, cell block, former Chaplain's Office, former Post Office and Huts 1, 2 and 3 were reported to be generally well presented and in good condition as at 9 April 2011.

The guard house and cell block building has been updated incrementally, yet the layout remains largely intact and the building is of high integrity. The cell block, a possible later addition to the building, has the cells in their original configuration and the interior of the cells is intact, with a timber bed, small window and a hatch on the door.

The former Chaplain's Office is generally of high integrity and contains all of its original windows and doors.

The former military post office is well presented and in good condition with the original windows and doors intact also.

Hut 3, currently being used as the precinct museum, has had no major alterations to the fabric of the building. Huts 1 and 2 are currently being used for storage but are intact.

== Heritage listing ==
The Ingleburn Military Heritage Precinct and Mont St Quentin Oval is of heritage significance as the entry point and command precinct of the first purpose built military training camp for WWII. The camp later became known as Ingleburn Defence site. The Ingleburn Defence site was also the place from where the first Australian troops to see active service in WWII at the town of Bardia, (the 16th Brigade of the 6th Division of the Second AIF) formed up. The Mont St Quentin Oval was most likely to be initially utilised as a parade ground for WWII troops at the site and was where the troops were formally farewelled before being shipped overseas, prior to the construction of official parade grounds . It is also of significance as one of the States key defence sites which coordinated the formation, training and dispatch of troops for most theatres of warfare during the 20th century.

The site's heritage significance is enhanced through its association with many military units which gave distinguished service in WWII such as the 16th Brigade of the 6th Division of the Second AIF, the first Australian unit to see armed conflict and the 2/13th Battalion variously known as the "devils own" or the "rats of Tobruk" for their determined fighting during the Siege of Tobruk. It also has historic associations with units fighting in the Korean War and the Vietnam War as well as with other social trends during the Vietnam War such as the anti-war lobby.

It is of State heritage significance for its association with generations of ex-servicemen who have passed through the site either en route to active service in overseas theatres of war or for National Service training. Items within the precinct and the Mont St Quentin are imbued with symbolic meaning for those associated with the place. The Bardia Barracks Entrance Gates symbolise the entrance to army life and the brick sentry boxes are symbolic of the long term military presence on site.

The Military Heritage Precinct established in 2002, is also significant as a good representative example of a command precinct for a large Army training site in NSW and Australia. The P1 type huts, guard house and cells as well as the former parade ground with its entry gates and viewing dais are characteristic of military infrastructure and are able to demonstrate the principal characteristics of military training sites. The Military Heritage Precinct and Mont St Quentin Oval is also representative of the historic military uses of the larger former Military Camp.

Ingleburn Military Heritage Precinct and Mont St Quentin Oval was listed on the New South Wales State Heritage Register on 15 March 2013 having satisfied the following criteria.

The place is important in demonstrating the course, or pattern, of cultural or natural history in New South Wales.

The Ingleburn Military Heritage Precinct is part of the Ingleburn Defence Site, also formerly known as the Ingleburn Army Camp. The former itself is of considerable historic significance as the first Australian purpose built infantry training camp for the Second World War and as one of Australia's major Army camps for the period 1939-1970s.

The Ingleburn Army Camp played a central role in the mobilisation of Australia's citizens, and in their military training, throughout the Second World War and was the assembly point for the first military contingent assembled for overseas service in the war. It is also significant for its role in the training of personnel for the Korean and Vietnam Wars.

The site remained a major training base in New South Wales for general recruits and national servicemen for many years afterwards until the abolition of compulsory military training in 1973.

The Army camp was a major centre in Australia for training under the National Service Scheme (1951-1972) and the guard house cells have historic associations with the anti conscription movement during the Vietnam War. The Army camp also played a major role in the training of Army Reserves from 1973 through to the 1990s.

The guard house and cell block at Bardia Barracks date from the period of the Second World War and are historically associated with that conflict and also with the Vietnam War through associations with the introduction of conscription and, in particular, their use to house conscientious objectors.

The memorials at the Ingleburn Military Heritage Precinct have important historic associations through the commemoration of the military presence at the site and the endeavours of military personnel who trained at the site.

The historic heritage values of the former Ingleburn Army Camp are embodied in the creation of the Military Heritage Precinct, including the following elements:

- remaining P1 type hut barracks dating from 1939-1946;
- entry gates and sentry boxes (symbolic of military presence and control at the site);
- Mont St Quentin Oval;
- the former Chaplains Office and Post Office
- the guard house and cell block dating from the period of the Second World War; and
- memorials

The place has a strong or special association with a person, or group of persons, of importance of cultural or natural history of New South Wales's history.

The Military Heritage Precinct now being the manifestation of the former Ingleburn Defence Site has an association with the lives and military experiences of generations of former service personnel. It has an important historic association with many military units which have given distinguished service in WWII such as the 16th Brigade of the 6th Division of the Second AIF, the first Australian unit to see armed conflict and the 2/13th Battalion variously known as the "devils own" or the "rats of Tobruk" for their determined fighting during the siege of Tobruk. It also has historic associations with units fighting in the Korean War and the Vietnam War as well as with other social trends during the Vietnam War such as the anti war lobby.

The place has strong or special association with a particular community or cultural group in New South Wales for social, cultural or spiritual reasons.

The Ingleburn Defence Site has come to symbolise the service given by, and is of social significance to, generations of service personnel who passed through either en route to active service or for National Service training.

It has social value to those who lived, and worked there, has a long association with a Statewide "Army community", and is a place where this sense of community is expressed, celebrated and passed on. It also serves to symbolise to the community the role of the Army within the area.

The Bardia Barracks entrance precinct symbolises the entry to Army life, an event which was formative in the lives of many thousands of people who served at Ingleburn. The entry gates are associated with the establishment of military barracks on the site from 1939 and with Bardia Barracks in particular. The brick sentry boxes are symbolic of the military presence at the site.

The site is significant as a place where respect for and remembrance of that service has become a continuing and highly valued tradition as evidenced by the creation of the Ingleburn Military Heritage Precinct. In particular, the memorials at the Military Heritage Precinct embody this aspect of the place's significance. The memorials were identified as highly significant focal points for reflection and remembrance by past and present Army personnel who had served at Ingleburn, their families and the local community.

The place is important in demonstrating the principal characteristics of a class of cultural or natural places/environments in New South Wales.

The Ingleburn Military Heritage Precinct and Mont St Quentin Oval is representative of a typical command precinct for a large Army training defence site in NSW and Australia. The P1-type huts, guard house and cells are characteristic of military infrastructure and typical of Army training defence sites in Australia. Therefore, they are able to demonstrate the principal characteristics of their specific types. The Precinct and Oval are also representative of the historic uses of the former defence site.
