= Bardiya (disambiguation) =

Bardiya was a son of Cyrus the Great.

Bardiya may also refer to:

- Bardiya District, Nepal
- Bardiya National Park, Nepal

== See also ==
- Bardia (disambiguation)
