= Meg Lees =

Australian former politician (born 1948)

Meg Lees AO

Leader of the Australian Progressive Alliance
- In office 3 April 2003 – 30 June 2005
- Deputy: Reese Malcolm
- Preceded by: Party established
- Succeeded by: Party abolished

6th Leader of the Australian Democrats
- In office 15 October 1997 – 6 April 2001
- Deputy: Natasha Stott Despoja
- Preceded by: Cheryl Kernot
- Succeeded by: Natasha Stott Despoja

5th Deputy Leader of the Australian Democrats
- In office 2 October 1991 – 15 October 1997
- Leader: John Coulter; Cheryl Kernot
- Preceded by: John Coulter
- Succeeded by: Natasha Stott Despoja

Senator for South Australia
- In office 4 April 1990 – 30 June 2005
- Preceded by: Janine Haines
- Succeeded by: Annette Hurley

Personal details
- Born: Meg Heather Francis; 19 October 1948 (age 78) Mount Riverview, New South Wales, Australia
- Party: Progressive Alliance (after 2003)
- Other political affiliations: Democrat (until 2002); Independent (2002–2003)
- Spouse: Keith Lees (m. 1971; div. 1996) Mathew Mitchell (m. 2000)
- Children: 4
- Education: Strathfield Girls High School
- Alma mater: Sydney Teachers' College; University of Sydney; University of Adelaide
- Occupation: School teacher (Ingleburn High School) (Mount Gambier High School) (Department of Education)
- Profession: Academic; Politician
- Website: megsdesk.com (archived)

Meg Heather Lees AO (née Francis, born 19 October 1948) is an Australian former politician who served as a Senator for South Australia from 1990 until 2005. She represented the Australian Democrats from 1990 to 2002, and was her party's leader from 1997 to 2001. As party leader she controversially facilitated passage of the Howard government's Goods and Services Tax (GST). This decision ultimately split the party and began a series of damaging leadership spills and resignations, destroying their public support and causing the party to be effectively defunct after the 2007 Australian federal election that saw their final four Senators lose their seats.

After being deposed by Natasha Stott Despoja, she quit the party to sit as an independent senator in 2002, adopting the party designation Australian Progressive Alliance from 2003 until her term expired in 2005, following her defeat at the 2004 election.

== Early life ==
Lees was born to Heather Francis, a music teacher, and Edwin Francis, a builder, in Mount Riverview, New South Wales. Lees is the eldest of four children, and has three brothers.

Lees mother, Heather Francis, described her as "headstrong" and "always had a mind of her own." Lees was interested in sports from a young age, playing hockey, tennis, and softball.

Lees was raised in the Catholic Apostolic Church, a strict fundamentalist religion, and was not allowed to mix freely with other children. At the age of 13, she refused to attend the Church's services. "I had friends at South Strathfield High School who were going to the Anglican Church so I started going with them." Her father was "Not terribly impressed," that she was attending Anglican Church services, but felt it was "Better that she was going to church than not going to church at all."

=== Pre-parliamentary career ===
In 1965, at the age of 16, Lees left school and became a lab assistant at Australian National Industries, then located in Lidcombe. She was soon doing work equivalent to that of the chief chemist, resulting in the ANI paying for her matriculation. She later left ANI after her boss told her that because she was female she would never gain a promotion.

Lees graduated with a diploma in physical education in 1969 from the Sydney Teachers' College. She was posted to Ingleburn High School. There she met Keith Lees, and they were married in 1971. The two began competing in racing competitions at the national level, racing their own Mini Cooper S at Amaroo Park and Oran Park Raceway.

In 1974, the couple moved to Mount Gambier in South Australia. Lees began teaching at Mount Gambier High School. Her two daughters were born in 1975 and 1977. After coming back from maternity leave, Lees was told by the school principal to either return full-time, or resign, as Lees had initially wanted to resume teaching part-time.

In 1979, Lees resumed teaching at Our Lady of the Pines Primary School in Nangwarry.

During the Ash Wednesday bushfires in 1983, Lees found herself in the middle of the fires while driving near Nangwarry. Lees later stated in an interview with The Sydney Morning Herald, "I made a commitment to myself that if I got out of that day - and a lot of people didn't - then I would really do something with my life."

=== Beginnings in the Australian Democrats ===
Six months after former Liberal Minister Don Chipp gave birth to the Democrats, both Meg and Keith signed up citing their strong environmental views. After working her way into the inner power groupings of the party, Lees had become party president of the Democrats in the early 1980s, and by this time had unsuccessfully contested State and Federal seats.

Before Janine Haines resignation from the Senate, Lees was drafted onto her staff in preparation of an appointment to the Senate.

== Political career ==
=== Appointment to the Senate ===
When Janine Haines resigned from the Senate to contest the Lower House seat of Kingston, Lees was chosen by the Parliament of South Australia, following the resignation of Janine Haines, to fill the vacancy. Lees assumed the role of Senator on 4 April 1990.

Upon her appointment, Lees became the Democrats spokesperson for Health, Women, Treasury and Prime Minister and Cabinet. In 1996, Lees amended legislation to establish the Medical Training Review Panel.

=== Leader of the Australian Democrats ===
Cheryl Kernot defected to the Australian Labor Party in October 1997, and Lees was called upon to stand in as acting leader. She was officially chosen as Kernot's replacement in December, with Natasha Stott Despoja becoming her deputy.

During her time as leader, the Democrats strengthened the Environment Protection and Biodiversity Act, improved the Pharmaceutical Benefits Scheme, negotiated the GST tax reform and maintained the general oversight role of the Democrats in the Senate through a number of Senate inquiries.

In 1999, Prime Minister John Howard proposed the idea of a Goods and Services Tax. It was opposed by the Labor Party, the Australian Greens and independent Senator Brian Harradine, which meant that it required Democrat support to pass. In an election fought on tax, the Democrats publicly stated that they liked neither the Liberal (GST) tax package nor the Labor package, but pledged to work with whichever party was elected to make their tax package better. They campaigned with the slogan "No GST on food". A majority of the senators in the party room agreed to pass the bill if some amendments were made, mostly to exclude fresh food and essential items such as basic medicines. Stott Despoja stated that she was unhappy with the outcome, particularly the GST on books. Both Stott Despoja and Queensland Senator Andrew Bartlett ultimately crossed the floor to vote against the GST package. Lees defended her position by saying, "Yes, we did not get everything... but we got an awful lot... It is one of the few chances a third party has to loosen the purse strings."

=== Removal as leader ===
A significant number of Democrat members remained unhappy with the GST deal, and began to agitate for a change in leadership. Under the Democrat constitution, a petition of 100 members can trigger a leadership ballot of all the members. On the initial ballot, Meg Lees was returned unchallenged. Subsequently, the Democrats faced a decline in the polls which, by April 2001, were indicating that several senators would lose their seats at the elections due for later that year. The members agitated again for a leadership ballot and, this time, Stott Despoja announced her intention to challenge Lees for the leadership, and was successful, replacing her on 6 April 2001.

In July 2002, Senator Lees faced disciplinary action from the Democrats after she supported the sale of Telstra. Lees also described Senator Stott Despoja's leadership style as "autocratic", and claimed that Stott Despoka had moved the party too far to the left. This culminated in Lees leaving the party to sit as an independent in July 2002.

Lees was active in the establishment of the Child Nutrition Programme in 1999, the Alcohol Education and Rehabilitation Foundation in 2001, and funding for Nyangatjatjara College, an indigenous college at Yulara in the Northern Territory in 2002. Lees also campaigned successfully for an alternative style of prescriptions, allowing for lifestyle changes to be included in doctors’ recommendations. Lees was also a member of the Parliamentary Delegation to Canada and China in late 2002.

=== Australian Progressive Alliance ===
In April 2003, Lees announced the founding of the Australian Progressive Alliance, which she claimed would have a more centrist view than the Democrats. However, she was defeated at the 2004 federal election and her term expired on 30 June 2005.

In 2003, Lees played a key role in convincing the Howard Government to trial Datacasting, technology capable of allowing for more accessible information and education services, to be conducted by the Australian Broadcasting Authority. Australian broadcast infrastructure company Broadcast Australia undertook a three-year trial in Sydney of a datacasting service using the DVB-T system for use in Australia. The trial consisted of a number of services collectively known as Digital Forty Four, providing ABC news, sport, and weather, as well as Federal parliamentary audio broadcasts, the Australian Christian Channel, and Expo Home Shopping.

== Post-political career ==
Lees has been a board member of Operation Flinders Foundation since 2005. Operation Flinders seeks to transform the lives of young people through remote outback adventure programs.

From 2006 to 2009, Lees was the chief executive officer of the Multiple Sclerosis Society of South Australia and Northern Territory.

In 2018, at the annual Australia Day Awards, Lees was made an Officer of the Order of Australia for her service to the Parliament and contributions to environmental and taxation reform.

=== Climate 200 ===
In 2021, Meg Lees joined Climate 200, an Australian climate advocacy group as a member of its advisory council, along with former independent MPs, Rob Oakeshott, Tony Windsor, and Kerryn Phelps, along with Liberal-turned-Independent Julia Banks. Lees joined the council, stating that "“if ever there was a need to keep the bastards honest now is the time,” and that she was "horrified" at the current state of politics.

== Personal life ==
Lees undertook a study tour of the United Kingdom in July 2000, and Thailand in June 2001.

Party political offices
Preceded by Cheryl Kernot	Leader of the Australian Democrats; 1997–2001	Succeeded by Natasha Stott Despoja
Preceded by —	Leader of the Australian Progressive Alliance; 2003–2005	Succeeded by —
