= Ingleburn High School =

Location
- Ingleburn, South Western Sydney, New South Wales; Australia; 34°00′19″S 150°52′16″E

Information
- Type: Government-funded co-educational secondary day school
- Motto: Tolerance, Integrity and Excellence
- Established: 1960; 66 years ago
- Educational authority: NSW Department of Education
- Years: 7–12
- Enrolment: 880 (2008)
- Website: ingleburn-h.schools.nsw.gov.au

Ingleburn High School is a government-funded comprehensive co-educational secondary day school, located in Ingleburn, a south-western suburb of Sydney, New South Wales, Australia.

== Overview ==
The school follows the New South Wales Education Standards Authority curriculum, which is provided to all schools in NSW. The School's motto is "Your School, Your Future". In 2008, the school consisted of 63.6 teaching staff and approximately 880 students.

Of the year 7 cohort, 2007, 50% met national numeracy benchmarks.

The 2009 year 9 cohort ranked below or substantially below both similar schools and all Australian schools in all performance areas (reading, writing, grammar & punctuation and numeracy) except for spelling in which the cohort performed close to similar and all Australian schools.

For 2009, Ingleburn High School was ranked 455 out of 555 NSW secondary schools by The Sydney Morning Herald, placing it in the bottom 20% of schools for which data was available.

In 2004, the student attendance rate for years 7 to 10 was below the district and state averages. In the years 2005, 2006, 2007 and 2008, the student attendance rate for years 7 to 10 and for years 11 to 12 were below the state averages. In 2008, the staff attendance rate was 93.9%.

There are programmes to support students of specific non-European origins. One programme in particular involves a "federally funded" "Aboriginal Education Worker" whose role will be to work with only Aboriginal students. The reason for this staff member is that the State has made it compulsory that only students of Aboriginal origin must have an "Individual Education Plan". Other programmes available to all students include the school newsletter voucher programme in which students who "collect 3 vouchers from different newsletters" may redeem their vouchers for a bronze award from a deputy principal.

The school's latest programme is PBIS or "Positive Behavior In School"; a programme developed by the "U.S. Office of Special Education Programs". The programme occupies students' time every fortnight requiring students to "focus on the positive behavioural expectations...of all students". Workshops includes topics such as "discussing with students our expectations regarding...moving around and through corridors and walkways". This programme also occupies staff time in "development sessions".

== Alumni ==
- Michele Bruniges – Secretary of Department of Education, Skills and Employment
- Meg Lees – former head of the Australian Democrats
- Glenn Williams – former baseball player and current CEO of Baseball Australia

== See also ==
- List of government schools in Sydney
- Education in Australia
