= Macquarie Links =

- Suburb
- Interactive map of Macquarie Links
- Coordinates: 33°58′55″S 150°52′26″E
- Country: Australia
- State: New South Wales
- City: Sydney
- LGA: City of Campbelltown
- Location: 42 km (26 mi) south-west of Sydney CBD

Government
  - State electorate: Macquarie Fields
  - Federal division: Hughes
- Elevation: 32 m (105 ft)

Population
  - Total: 1,455 (SAL 2021)
- Postcode: 2565
Suburbs around Macquarie Links
Denham Court	Edmondson Park	Glenfield
Denham Court	Macquarie Links	Macquarie Fields
Ingleburn	Ingleburn	Macquarie Fields

Macquarie Links is not Macquarie Fields or Macquarie Park.

Macquarie Links is a suburb of Sydney, in the state of New South Wales, Australia. Macquarie Links is located 42 kilometres (26 mi) south-west of the Sydney central business district, in the local government area of the City of Campbelltown and is part of the Macarthur region.

Macquarie Links has been a suburb restricted to local residents since late 2003. A gated community, residents there chose to close the gates at the estate's only entrance in 2003, as this had dramatically reduced the number of break-ins and vehicle thefts.. Security guards log the number plates of all vehicles entering the suburb, and locals carry ID cards as part of efforts to deter criminal activity.

== Sports ==
The suburb is home to the Macquarie Links International Golf Club. The 6,300-metre, par-72 course was designed by Robin Nelson to complement the area's natural environment.

== Development ==
Development was completed in 2018, comprising 14 stages of houses, 3 stages of villas, and 2 apartment blocks. The community features a large pool, two tennis courts, two BBQ areas, and a Community Centre available for residents' use.
