= Ingleburn Army Camp =

Coordinates: 33°58′27″S 150°51′14″E

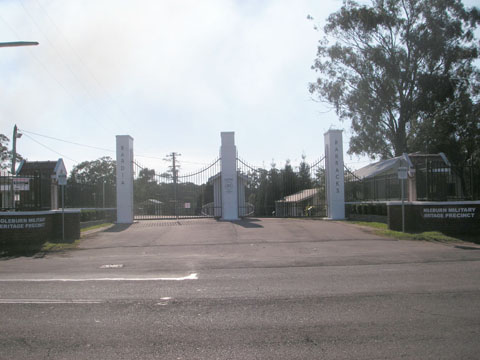
Bardia Barracks, part of the old Ingleburn Army Camp

Ingleburn Army Camp was a purpose-built camp constructed in 1940 for the Australian Army at Ingleburn, New South Wales, Australia.

== History ==
During World War II, the camp became the major army training facility in New South Wales. Many important army units who trained at the camp served in some of the major engagements of World War II. All corps were trained at the camp including engineers, transport, signals and anti-aircraft units. Originally known as "Ingleburn Military Camp", the Commonwealth acquired 684 acres (2.77 km^{2}) in 1940, which the army had already occupied after setting up tents on 8 October 1939. Accommodation was constructed shortly after by the 2/16th Australian Infantry Battalion to provide for the formation of the Second Australian Imperial Force (2AIF).

Following the outbreak of the Korean War during the 1950s, battalions destined for Korea were stationed at the camp. National Service recommenced and the camp was a major National Service centre. Many Australians experienced military training at the camp prior to be posted to an Army Reserve unit in their home locations.

On 13 June 1952, American folk singer, Burl Ives performed for soldiers at the Ingleburn Army Camp.

The Commonwealth Government extended compulsory military training in 1964 and conscripts were sent on military operations outside Australia. The training of National Service recruits was the main function of the camp from 1951 until 1972, when the Commonwealth Government abolished National Service. Since the end of World War II the camp's main function was training camp for the National Service Scheme (1951–72) and as the Headquarters of Second Training Group of the Army Reserves (post 1973).

The Camp on the southern side of Campbeltown road was occupied by the First Signal Regiment from my earliest recollection in the late 1960s until about 1980 when 1 Sig Regt was redeployed to Enoggera Barracks in Brisbane, Queensland. 101 Field workshop was located on Macdonald Rd, opposite the Ingleburn Area Officer's mess. The Area Sergeants Mess was located adjacent to the 2nd Military Hospital and the Military Police school and the Military Correction Establishment. 1 Field Hygiene company was located next to I Field Hospital, commonly known as Manunda Lines. Following its tour of duty in Phuoc Tuy Province South Vietnam, HQ 1 Coy RAASC and its organic 21 Sup Pl and transport Platoons were deployed to Ingleburn in 1966 and were located to the rear of 1 Field Hospital.

The Camp began was wound down in the mid-1990s with units gradually being transferred to other locations. Many buildings were demolished or destroyed by fire in the late 1990s. The site has been vacant since late 2000. Over the past ten years the barracks has been occupied by the Ingleburn Military Precinct Association. The association caters for tours from RSL sub branches, historical units, Probis clubs and schools.

== Units based at Ingleburn Army Camp ==
- 2/16th Australian Infantry Battalion
- 2/20th Australian Infantry Battalion
- 1 Signal Regiment: early 1960s (granted freedom to enter City of Campbelltown 1964) - December 1980
- 2nd Military Hospital: established in the 1940s, became known as 1st Field Hospital in the 90s. 1st Field Hospital was located further down the road from 2nd Military Hospital and was deployed to Vietnam in the 1960s. In the 1960s and early 1970s, 2nd Military Hospital (known as '2Mil Hospital') received casualties of wounded soldiers evacuated from Vietnam, as well as serving the nearby Holsworthy Army base. 1st Field Hospital returned from Vung Tau in 1972 and became inactive so far as receiving patients was concerned. The two units were combined in the 90s and became known as 1st Field Hospital; they kept the 2nd Military Hospital location. The hospital moved to Holsworthy Barracks in the late 1990s. It was later renamed 1st Close Health Battalion.
- 2nd Training Group 1974 until the late 1990s when all reserve soldiers did their basic training at Blamey Barracks, near Wagga Wagga NSW.
- 2nd Military Corrections Centre (2MCE), moved to Holsorthy in 1994
- 1st Preventative Medicine Company was at Ingleburn Barracks before and after 1979. They had extensive tours in Papua/New Guinea prior to 1979. They also had their own Transport yard opposite their own Q store.
- 101st Field Workshop
- In 1952 the Royal Australian Regiment Depot was raised at Ingleburn, and provided advanced infantry training for regular infantry prior to deployment overseas, this eventually became the 4th Battalion, the Royal Australian Regiment. The School of Infantry was raised at Ingleburn from 1960 until 1972, when it moved to Singleton NSW. It had moved from Seymour Victoria in 1959.
- The 13th National Service Training Battalion was also based at Ingleburn between 1951 and 1959.

== Memorials ==
The memorials located at Ingleburn Army Camp include:

- 2/16th Australian Infantry Battalion Memorial (relocated)
- National Servicemen Memorial (relocated)
- 2 Officer Cadet Training Unit
- Memorial Wall dedicated (lists names of all units which have served at Ingleburn)
- Memorial grove of cypress surrounding a sandstone column monument
