= Macquarie Fields =

- Suburb
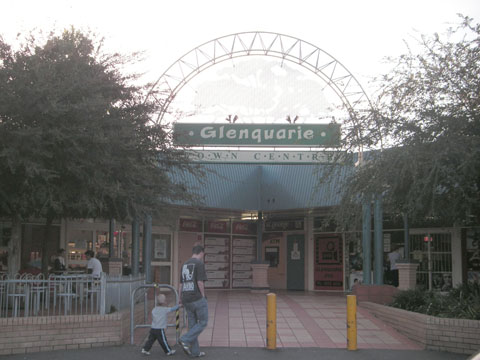
- Glenquarie Shopping Centre, Macquarie Fields

- Interactive map of Macquarie Fields
- Coordinates: 33°59′40″S 150°53′15″E
- Country: Australia
- State: New South Wales
- City: Sydney
- LGA: Campbelltown
- Location: 38 km (24 mi) south-west of Sydney
- Established: 1883

Government
  - State electorate: Macquarie Fields
  - Federal division: Hughes
- Elevation: 40 m (130 ft)

Population
  - Total: 14,023 (SAL 2021)
- Postcode: 2564
Suburbs around Macquarie Fields
Macquarie Links	Glenfield	Holsworthy
Macquarie Links	Macquarie Fields	Holsworthy
Ingleburn	Ingleburn	Long Point

Macquarie Fields is a suburb of Sydney, in the state of New South Wales, Australia. Macquarie Fields is located 38 kilometres south-west of the Sydney central business district, in the local government area of the City of Campbelltown and is part of the Macarthur region.

Macquarie Fields is surrounded by bushland. Nearby Macquarie Links, is a high-security housing estate beside an international standard golf course. The suburb has multiple high schools including Macquarie Fields High School and James Meehan High School.

== History ==
The original inhabitants of the Macquarie Fields area were the Darug people of western Sydney. The rich soil of the area was home to an abundance of plants which in turn attracted animals such as kangaroos and emus, both of which along with this part with yams and other native vegetables and fruit were part of the diet of the Darug. They lived in small huts called gunyahs, made spears, tomahawks and boomerangs for hunting and had an elaborate system of tribal law and rituals with its origins in the Dreamtime. However, following the arrival of the First Fleet in 1788, they were pushed off their land by the British settlers.

Macquarie Fields was named by early landholder James Meehan in honour of the Governor of New South Wales, Lachlan Macquarie. The area was surveyed by Meehan in the early 19th century. Although transported to Australia as a convict for his role in the Irish Rebellion of 1798, Meehan had trained as a surveyor in Ireland and in 1803 was appointed an assistant to NSW Surveyor-General Charles Grimes. In 1806 he was granted a full pardon and in 1810 became Surveyor-General. For his work, he was granted a number of parcels of land including 2,020 acres (8.2 km^{2}) in what is now Macquarie Fields and neighbouring suburbs. He used the rich soil to grow cereal crops, fruit trees and to graze livestock.

The property changed hands a couple of times after Meehan's death and in the 1840s, Samuel Terry built a Regency mansion, Macquarie Fields House, which still stands to this day. It is now listed on the Register of the National Estate. In 1883, then owner William Phillips subdivided the land to create a new town he called Glenwood Estate with grand boulevards and fine buildings. A railway station was added to the line in 1888 but the depression of the 1890s meant the grand town failed to materialize with only a few small houses built on the lots. In the next Great Depression of the 1930s, the area became popular with the homeless who made makeshift huts, not unlike those of the earlier Darug people.

After World War II, the village grew steadily. A public school was opened in 1958 and by 1971, the population reached 3700. In the mid-1970s, a large Housing Commission development was built on the east side of town and given the suburb names of Bunbury (later Guise) and Curran after the local creek. Residents of the privately owned areas of Macquarie Fields were strongly opposed to the new developments being included in their suburb and this continued well into the 1980s. Since that time, local authorities have tried to blend the area into a single suburb. Private housing developments sprung up further around and the weight of population contributed to a larger town centre.

=== 21st century ===
In 2005, riots were sparked by a high-speed police pursuit on 25 February through the Glenquarie housing estate in Macquarie Fields. The chase resulted in the driver, 20-year-old Jesse Kelly, crashing the stolen vehicle into a tree and killing his two passengers, 17-year-old Dylan Raywood and 19-year-old Matthew Robertson.

== Heritage listings ==
Macquarie Fields has a number of heritage-listed sites, including:

- Quarter Sessions Road: Macquarie Field House

== Demographics ==
According to the 2021 census, there were about 14,023 people in Macquarie Fields.

- Aboriginal and Torres Strait Islander people made up 4.9% of the population.
- 52.5% of people were born in Australia; the next most common countries of birth were Bangladesh 7.0%, India 5.3%, New Zealand 2.6%, the Philippines 2.6%, and Fiji 2.5%.
- 48.3% of people only spoke English at home; other languages spoken at home included Bengali 9.3%, Arabic 4.0%, Nepali 2.7%, Samoan 2.7% and Hindi 2.6%.
- The most common responses for religion included No Religion 20.1%, Catholic 16.6%, Islam 16.4%, Hinduism 10.4%, and Anglican 8.7%.

== Transport ==
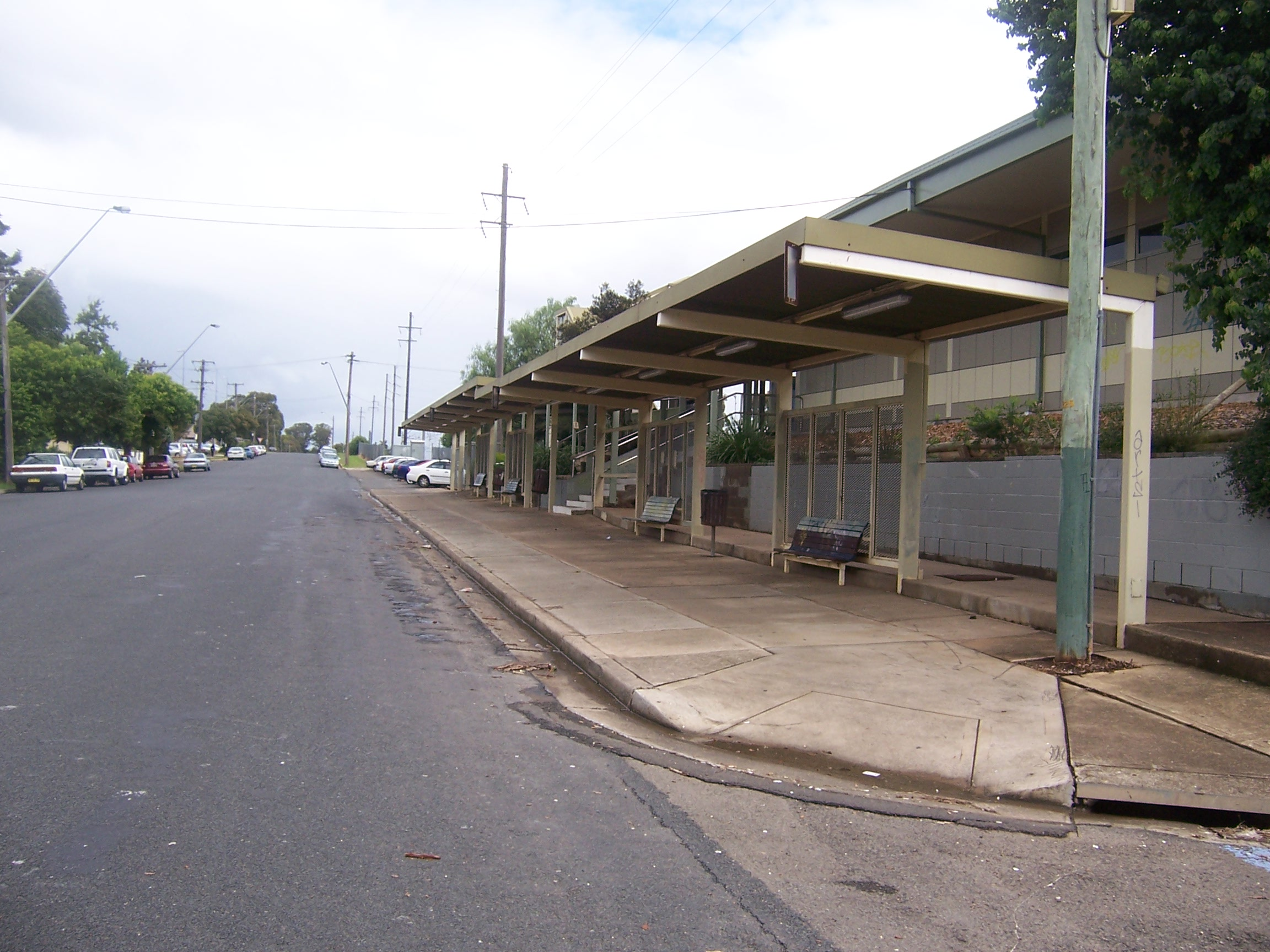
Macquarie Fields Station

Macquarie Fields railway station is on the Main Southern railway line. Transit Systems NSW currently operate a bus depot in Macquarie Fields.

Macquarie Fields was serviced by four Interline Bus Services bus routes. In September 2023 these were taken over by Transit Systems who was awarded the Sydney Metropolitan Bus Service Contracts Region 2 until 2031.

870 Campbelltown Hospital to Liverpool Station
871 Campbelltown Hospital to Liverpool Station
872 Campbelltown Hospital to Liverpool Station
876 Eucalyptus Drive to Macquarie Fields Station

== Sport and recreation ==
The town is home to Macquarie Fields Leisure Centre, which contains an indoor aquatic centre and an outdoor Olympic sized swimming pool. It also encompasses a gymnasium and indoor sports facilities. There is also a number of sporting fields in the town. Sporting fields include Bensley Road, Hazlet Oval, Monarch Oval and Third Avenue.

== Services ==
Macquarie Fields contains the WorkVentures Connect Centre at Macquarie Fields.

== Notable residents ==
- Simon Dwyer – rugby league player
- Brett Emerton – Australian footballer with 95 appearances and 20 goals for Australia whilst representing Feyenoord in the Eredivisie, Blackburn Rovers in the English Premier League and Sydney FC in the A-League. Emerton grew up in Macquarie Fields, playing for local club Gunners FC
- George McGowan – rugby league player
- Sean Turnell – economist
