= Denham Court =

- Suburb
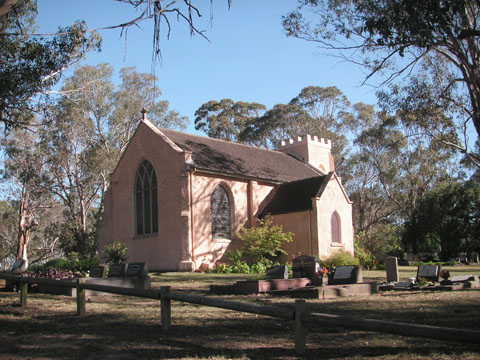
- Denham Court Anglican Church

- Interactive map of Denham Court
- Coordinates: 33°58′51″S 150°49′55″E
- Country: Australia
- State: New South Wales
- City: Sydney
- LGAs: Campbelltown; Liverpool; Camden
- Location: 44 km (27 mi) SW of Sydney CBD

Government
  - State electorates: Leppington; Macquarie Fields
  - Federal division: Macarthur
- Elevation: 95 m (312 ft)

Population
  - Total: 9,129 (2021 census)
- Postcode: 2565
Suburbs around Denham Court
Leppington	Edmondson Park	Ingleburn
Leppington	Denham Court	Bardia
Leppington	Varroville	St Andrews

Denham Court is a suburb of Sydney, in the state of New South Wales, Australia located 44 kilometres (27 mi) south-west of the Sydney central business district, in the local government areas of the City of Campbelltown, City of Liverpool and City of Camden. It is part of the Macarthur region.

The suburb is one of the most affluent in south-west Sydney, with the median property price standing at $1.60 million in January 2015, over three times higher than the median of properties in surrounding suburbs. The median income also stands noticeably above the average of surrounding suburbs at over $1,900 per week, while the median of surrounding areas stands at $900 per week. Willowdale Estate which was developed by Stockland is one of the most noticeable settlement in Denham Court. The area is most well known for its luxurious properties, including a colonial era compound from which the suburb takes its name

== History ==
The suburb of Denham Court was named after the 202-hectare (500-acre) land grant of 1810 to Richard Atkins. Gowan Place honours Gowan Flora Macdonald, while McCormack Place notes an early family in the district. Streets of Denham Court which are actually located in Liverpool Council area, such as Springmead Drive, Culverston Avenue and Pembury Close recall the names of early farms, while Cubitt Drive and Cassidy Street note pioneer land-holders such as William Cassidy and Daniel Cubitt.

The Anglican Church was built in 1838, originally as a private chapel. Sunday services continue to be held in the chapel and hall, at 8am and 10am.

Denham Court Post Office opened on 1 May 1862 and closed in 1882.

== Heritage listings ==
Denham Court has a number of heritage-listed sites, including:

- 238 Campbelltown Road: Denham Court (homestead)

== Housing ==
Denham Court is one of the more affluent suburbs in south western Sydney. It is sometimes referred to as 'the south-western millionaires' row', in reference to the row of mansions along Denham Court Road, where a prominent ridge allows views all the way to Sydney. In 2012, sales in suburb have ranged from A$1 million to offerings of up to A$6 million for a luxurious compound.

== Population ==
According to the 2021 census, Denham Court had a population of 9,129 people. The median age was 33. The median household income was $2,448 per week compared to a national figure of $1,770. The most common ancestries in Denham Court were Australian 15.0%, English 12.3%, Indian 10.8%, Italian 7.9%, Filipino 4.9%, Irish 4.7% and Scottish 4.3%. 54.7% of people were born in Australia. 44.9% of people spoke only English at home. Other languages spoken at home included Arabic at 6.9%. The most common responses for religion in Denham Court (State Suburbs) were Catholic 28.7%, Islam 16.2%, Hinduism 10.1%, Not stated 10.1% and Jehovah's Witnesses 5.0%. In Denham Court (State Suburbs), Christianity was the largest religious group reported overall (72.8%) (this figure excludes not stated responses).

=== Notable residents ===
- John Marsden (1942–2006) - solicitor
