= William Redfern =

Convict surgeon in Australia (1774–1833)

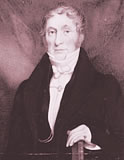
- Dr William Redfern
- Born: c. 1775; Canada
- Died: 17 July 1833 (aged 57–58); Edinburgh, United Kingdom
- Occupations: Surgeon, bank director, farmer, magistrate
- Known for: Surgeon on Norfolk Island and in Sydney hospitals Australia's first medical graduate Pioneer in public health medicine
- Spouse: Sarah Wills (1796–1875)
- Children: William Lachlan Macquarie Redfern (1819-1904); Robert Joseph Foveaux Redfern (1823-1830)

William Redfern (1775 – 17 July 1833) was the surgeon's first mate aboard HMS Standard during the May 1797 Nore mutiny, and at a court martial in August 1797 he was sentenced to death for his involvement. His sentence was later commuted and in 1801 he was transported to the Colony of New South Wales and assigned as an assistant to the Norfolk Island hospital. In this post he demonstrated the medical skills that enabled him to become one of the colony's most revered physicians and a pioneer in public health. Redfern advocated major reforms to sanitary conditions aboard convict ships and this significantly reduced the morbidity rates of convicts arriving in New South Wales. Later in life he became a highly successful farmer, bank director and an emancipist rights activist.

== Early life ==
William Redfern was born in Canada, the third son of Robert and Margaret Redfern from Northern Ireland. The family returned to England and settled in Trowbridge in Wiltshire. In 1790, William Redfern became a surgeon's apprentice to his older brother Thomas. On 19 January 1797, after seven years training as a surgeon and physician, the 22-year-old passed an examination set by the Company of Surgeons in London that enabled him to join the Royal Navy as a physician aboard all warships, or a surgeon on warships of third rate and above. On 23 January 1797 Redfern was assigned to the third-rate 64-gun HMS Standard as a surgeon's first mate.

== The 1797 mutiny at the Nore ==
When Redfern joined the Royal Navy, Britain had been at war with the Spanish, French and Dutch for four years. It was also a period when naval seamen were protesting about low pay, bad food, poor health care and harsh discipline. Such issues had always existed in the navy, but the inability of sailors to support their families at a time of significant social unrest in Britain fuelled their dissent. Of particular concern to the crews on warships of the North Sea Fleet, to which HMS Standard was attached, were the virulent diseases plaguing the lower decks. Petitions to the Admiralty for better medical care were ignored and in May 1797 10,000 common seaman took control of the North Sea Fleet and sailed the ships from the Yarmouth to the Nore sandbank on the Thames. Many ship surgeons who were deemed inept were put ashore and surgeon's mates had to assume their duties. First Mate William Redfern did this aboard HMS Standard. When the Admiralty refused to meet the seamen's demands, they blockaded the Thames to all shipping in and out of London.

The Nore mutiny eventually petered out when the Government threatened military intervention and 560 of the leading mutineers were arrested. This included William Redfern who was accused by the captain of HMS Standard of supporting the mutiny. 412 of the accused seamen were court martialled and 59 sentenced to hanging. Some sentences were later commuted to prison, flogging and transportation.

Redfern was the highest-ranking seaman charged with mutiny. At his court martial on 22 August 1797 he strongly refuted the accusations of Thomas Parr, captain of HMS Standard, claiming that he had acted as surgeon against his wishes, and had resigned his commission twice. Although no witness testified that Redfern had collaborated with the mutineers, he was found guilty and sentenced to death. Ten days later the sentence was commuted to a year's solitary confinement followed by transportation for life. Redfern spent three years in Coldbath Fields Prison, England's cruellest gaol. The prison was so notorious that in 1800 the government appointed Inspector General of Health, Sir Jeremiah Fitzpatrick, to investigate it. At an interview with Fitzpatrick, Redfern requested transportation as soon as possible, and to be allowed to work on the convict ship as a surgeon.

== Transportation to New South Wales ==
In January 1801, Redfern was moved to the prison hulk Captivity docked in Portsmouth. Two months later he was assigned to assist the surgeon on the hulk La Fortunée moored in Langstone Harbour. In May Redfern boarded the convict ship Canada and was assigned to keep the medical diaries and assist the ship's surgeons. On 21 June 1801, the Canada, with the Minorca and the Nile, set sail for New South Wales with 541 people on board. Mid voyage Redfern was urgently transferred to the Minorca to treat two very sick patients. He was on the Minorca when the convoy reached Port Jackson on 15 December 1801.

== Norfolk Island ==
Shortly after arriving in Sydney, Redfern was shipped to Norfolk Island. He arrived on 8 January 1802 and was made a convict assistant to the hospital surgeon James Mileham. However, Mileham left the island three months later and his replacement Thomas Roberts drowned in a boating accident in June. This was a critical loss and Lieutenant Governor Joseph Foveaux temporarily put Redfern in charge of the hospital until a free surgeon could be brought to the island. Given this opportunity Redfern excelled in the role and when another free surgeon could not be found by November Foveaux granted Redfern a conditional pardon, and in April 1803 recommended Governor King award him an absolute pardon. In 1804 assistant surgeon D'Arcy Wentworth arrived on Norfolk Island to take charge of the hospital and Redfern remained as his assistant. By this time Redfern was also active on the island as a farmer and trader in agricultural produce, and remained so until his return to Sydney in June 1808.

== Medical career ==
Following the overthrow of the Governor of New South Wales William Bligh in January 1808, the rebel administration made Joseph Foveaux the NSW Lieutenant Governor. In August 1808 Foveaux appointed Redfern as a government surgeon at the Sydney general hospital on George Street. The appointment was conditional on proof of his medical qualifications. Redfern's medical records had been lost in the mutiny, so he agreed to be examined by a colonial medical board composed of Principal Surgeon Thomas Jamison, NSW Corps Surgeon John Harris and Corps Assistant Surgeon William Bohan. Redfern passed the examination and was awarded the first medical diploma issued in Australia. Foveaux then wrote to the British Colonial Secretary Lord Castlereagh seeking confirmation of the appointment. King George III confirmed Redfern as a government surgeon in February 1812.

Among his other official duties, Government Surgeon Redfern treated the imprisoned Governor Bligh and his daughter Mary. Bligh was a captain of a warship that mutinied at the Nore but had insisted his crew be pardoned. It is likely the two men had much to reminisce about. In September 1809 Redfern vaccinated children across the colony against smallpox, after ensuring that the community was well informed of the advantages of the inoculation. Redfern treated mostly convicts and the disadvantaged at the general hospital, but he also ran a busy private medical practise. His reputation as a physician, surgeon and obstetrician made his low-cost private services highly sought after.

The appointment of Lachlan Macquarie as Governor of NSW in January 1810 was a major turning point in Redfern's life. Macquarie considered hardworking well-behaved emancipists to be among the most useful members of the colony, and he prioritised rehabilitation over punishment, seeing personal repatriation into the society of freemen as an ultimate goal for convicts. To emphasise this commitment, Macquarie invited prominent emancipists to dine at Government House and these occasions often included Redfern. Within months of his arrival Macquarie had approved the construction of a new general hospital on Macquarie Street and appointed Redfern as the health inspector of incoming convict ships. He later became the governor's personal physician, travel companion and close confidant. In March 1811 William married Sarah Wills and they had two sons; William Lachlan Macquarie was born in 1819 and Robert Joseph Foveaux in 1823.

In 1812 Redfern accepted James Sheers as a surgeon apprentice at the hospital. This made Sheers Australia's first medical student and Redfern its first medical teacher. Improving sanitary conditions aboard convict ships is considered one of Redfern's greatest achievements. In 1814 the three convict ships, General Hewitt, Three Bees and Surry, arrived in Sydney with major outbreaks of scurvy, typhus and dysentery. It was greatly feared that the typhus rampant on the Surry would affect the colony and Australia's first quarantine camp was created on the north shore of the harbour opposite Dawes Point (today in the vicinity of Jeffreys Street, Kirribilli). In this camp D'Arcy Wentworth and Redfern treated infected seamen from the Surry. Later Redfern was appointed to lead an inquiry into the infections and high death rate on the three ships and he recommended major reforms to sanitation, diet, air circulation and medical assistance on convict transports. In 1815 the British Government adopted most of these reforms and they improved conditions aboard all subsequent transport ships, significantly reducing convict morbidity and mortality.

A new Sydney General Hospital was officially opened on Macquarie Street in April 1816. The central block of the three-winged building contained the hospital wards. The north wing was assigned as the residence of Principal Surgeon Wentworth and the south wing as the residence of the Assistant Surgeon Redfern and his wife Sarah. Today, these two outer buildings remain – the southern wing is now The Mint and the northern wing is the Parliament House of New South Wales.

== Bank director ==
Early in his tenure Governor Macquarie recommended the establishment of a bank in the colony, but the British government had rejected the proposition. However, in November 1816 Macquarie was strongly urged by commercial interests in Sydney to establish the Bank of New South Wales with 104 bank shares offered for purchase. On 7 February 1817, a meeting of interested residents elected seven founding directors of Australia's first bank: William Redfern, D'Arcy Wentworth, John Harris, Robert Jenkins, Thomas Wylde, Alexander Riley and John Campbell. The bank opened its doors to the public on 8 April 1817. Redfern remained a director until 1820 and was again elected in 1827.

== Commission of inquiry ==
Macquarie's egalitarian policies, and his efforts to convert the penal colony into a free and prosperous settlement, were strongly resisted in Britain by the Tory conservative government. A majority in the British Parliament asserted that the colony should remain a harsh penal settlement to be feared by potential criminals. They claimed that not only was improving the lives of convicts and emancipists eroding transportation as a deterrent to crime, the residents of the colony were now on the whole better fed, dressed and more securely employed than most of the poor in Britain.

On 5 January 1819, Lord Bathurst appointed John Thomas Bigge as the Commissioner of Inquiry to examine the functioning of the New South Wales colony. Bigge was advised to challenge Macquarie's policy of rehabilitating convicts and favouring emancipists. Macquarie had recently recommended Redfern to be the next Principal Surgeon when D'Arcy Wentworth retired, but Bathurst opposed emancipists in major government posts and had selected naval surgeon James Bowman instead. Both Bigge and Bowman arrived in the colony on the John Barry on 26 September 1819. Redfern was devastated by his rejection and promptly resigned as the senior hospital surgeon, closed his private practice and moved immediately with his family to their Campbellfield farm in Minto.

Macquarie was distressed that Bathurst had ignored his advice, and to compensate he appointed Redfern to be a magistrate in the District of Airds. Commissioner Bigge opposed ex-convicts becoming magistrates and requested the appointment be reversed. Macquarie stood firm and they clashed bitterly over all subsequent egalitarian issues. In conducting his inquiry into the colonial governance, Bigge mostly interviewed 'exclusive free' residents who opposed Macquarie's social reforms. The Commissioner interrogated Redfern several times, seemingly to unearth irregularities in the doctor's medical administration of the hospital and his close relationship with Macquarie. These fiery meetings led Redfern to accuse Bigge of behaving like 'a Spanish Inquisitor'. Bigge would later claim that Redfern was the only person in the colony who resisted the commission's authority.

== Emancipist rights activist ==
In 1819, a London court judgment reversed the established legal rights of emancipists in the colony. It ruled that persons granted a government pardon in the colony had no legal rights unless such pardons were ratified under the Great Seal of Britain. This ruling implied that emancipists had no right to own or sell property. In 1820, the Sydney Judge Barron Field reaffirmed this ruling, thus invalidating all assets and transactions of pardoned convicts in the colony. The entire community was in an uproar because almost all assets were affected; most land in the colony was held by emancipists. A major assembly was held in Sydney in January 1821 and Redfern and Edward Eagar were elected to petition the British Parliament on restoring the legal and civil rights of emancipists. The two men arrived in London in June 1822 and successfully lobbied the British Parliament. The civil rights to emancipists were restored in the Male Convicts Act 1823 (4 Geo. 4. c. 47) and the Transportation Act 1824 (5 Geo. 4. c. 84).

Commissioner Bigge published his first report on his NSW inquiry shortly after Redfern and Eagar reached Britain. Redfern expected personal condemnation in the report but was incensed at the explicitness of the publication. Lachlan Macquarie, who had returned to London in July 1822, was also upset by the severity of the inquiry report, and so was William Wentworth, D'Arcy Wentworth's eldest son, who was a barrister in London. Redfern, Eagar, William Wentworth and Joseph Foveaux met with Lachlan Macquarie to discuss a response to accusations made by Bigge. In December 1822 Redfern engaged Wentworth to sue Bigge for damage to his character and reputation. The case was abandoned when Bigge agreed to withdraw earlier accusations, and not slander Redfern in two future inquiry reports. Redfern returned to Sydney in July 1824.

== Farming ==
After 1820 William Redfern no longer routinely practiced medicine and concentrated on cultivating his 22,500 acres of land at Campbellfield and elsewhere. Even John Bigge admitted that Redfern's properties were 'in the best state of cultivation and exhibit the greatest improvement' among the colony's eight farms. The Campbellfield estate of 6,000 acres grew cereal crops and grazed large herds of cattle and sheep. The estate had 60 horses, a horse stud and a racecourse with a grandstand. On his return trip from England in 1824, Redfern had brought vine cuttings and a Portuguese winemaker from Madeira to start a vineyard at Campbellfield. William Redfern is reputed to be first to cultivate the grape variety Verdelho commercially in Australia.

== Final years ==
In 1828, Redfern sailed to England with his eldest son William Jr. to oversee his education. From 1829 to 1831, while his son attended school in Edinburgh Redfern enrolled to study medicine at the University of Edinburgh. His wife Sarah and younger son Robert had been expected to follow them, but a serious accident had initially prevented Sarah from travelling and then the sudden death of 7-year-old Robert in 1830, further delayed the long journey. On 17 July 1833, William Redfern died after a short illness and is buried in Edinburgh. Sarah had already sailed to see her husband and son, and arrived in Edinburgh via London only days after his death.

== Legacy ==
Redfern's commitment to improving the health of transported convicts is now seen as pioneering preventive medicine in Australia. Redfern is recognised as the first public health physician in Australia and has been honoured since 1994 by the Royal Australasian College of Physicians with the annual William Redfern Oration. He is widely regarded as a 'Father of Australian medicine'.

William Redfern is widely honoured across New South Wales. The 100 acres of the 'Dr. Redfern's Estate' on Botany Road were sold in 1843 and today encompass one third of the Sydney suburb of Redfern. The Campbelltown suburb of Minto in outer Sydney occupies much of what was Redfern's 6,000 acres of Campbellfield estate. Redfern has been named on street signs and parks in cities and towns across Australia.

In 1961 the Australian Broadcasting Corporation (ABC) televised The Outcasts, a historical drama in twelve episodes, in which Redfern was the central figure. The main theme of The Outcasts was Redfern's role in the building of a new general hospital on Macquarie Street, Sydney. Redfern also reportedly inspired the character played by Alan Ladd in the Hollywood film Botany Bay.

== Bibliography ==
- Hall, Annegret (2023). Doctor Redfern: Mutineer, Convict, Medical Pioneer, Rights Activist, ESH Publication. ISBN 978-0-9876292-4-1
- Jones, Arthur Raymond (2019). Better than Cure: The life and times of the ebullient and resilient William Redfern, Volume 1 - Wellbeing in the wooden world. ISBN 978-0-6484471-8-4
- Jones, Arthur Raymond (2019). Better than Cure: The life and times of the ebullient and resilient William Redfern, Volume 2 - Wellbeing in the colony. ISBN 978-0-6484471-9-1
- Historical Records of Australia, Vol. VI-X.
