= Ingleburn, New South Wales =

Ingleburn
- Suburb
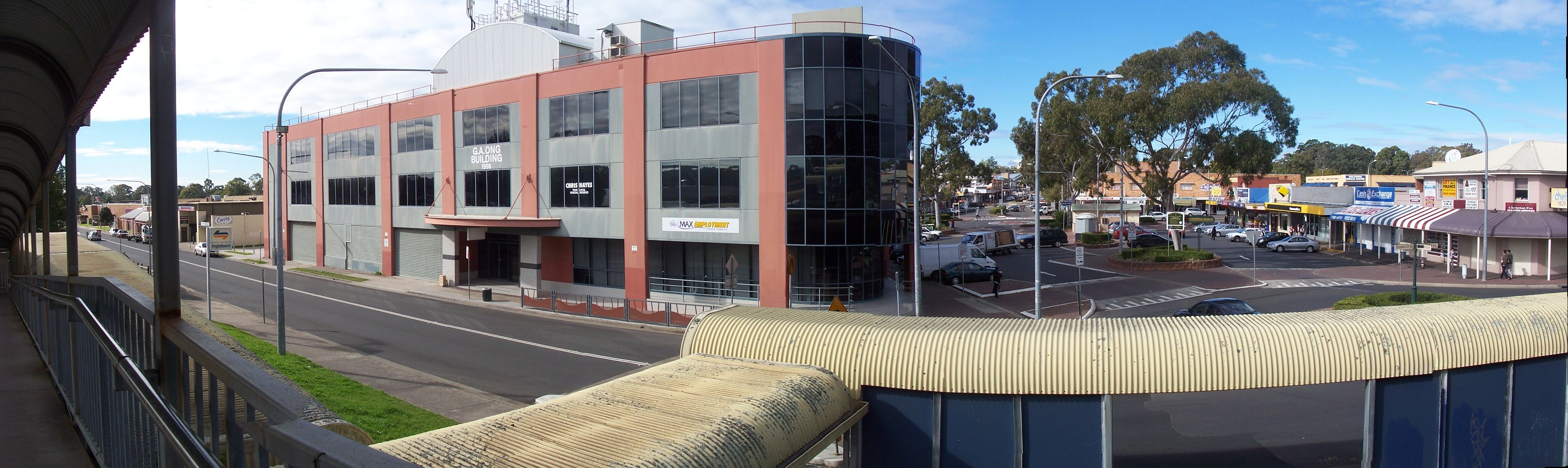
- Ingleburn

- Interactive map of Ingleburn
- Coordinates: 33°59′8″S 150°51′13″E
- Country: Australia
- State: New South Wales
- City: Sydney
- LGA: City of Campbelltown
- Location: 45 km (28 mi) south-west of Sydney CBD
- Established: 1883

Government
  - State electorate: Macquarie Fields
  - Federal divisions: Hughes; Macarthur
- Elevation: 34 m (112 ft)

Population
  - Total: 15,264 (2021 census)
- Postcode: 2565
Suburbs around Ingleburn
Denham Court	Macquarie Links	Macquarie Fields
Varroville	Ingleburn	Long Point
Bow Bowing	Minto	Minto Heights

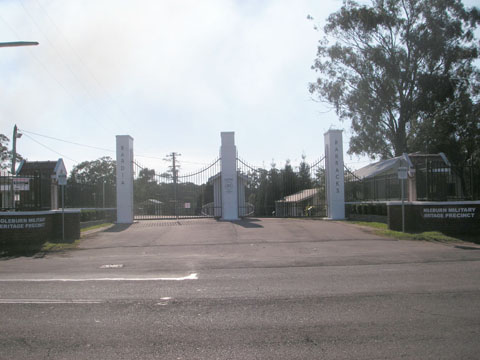
Bardia Barracks, part of the historic Ingleburn Army Camp

Ingleburn is a suburb of Sydney, in the state of New South Wales, Australia, 45 kilometres (28 mi) south-west of the Sydney central business district, in the local government area of City of Campbelltown. It is part of the Macarthur region. Ingleburn is located approximately halfway between the two commercial centres of Liverpool and Campbelltown.

== History ==
The land in the Ingleburn area was originally inhabited by the Tharawal people prior to the arrival of settlers from the First Fleet in 1788. The first land grants in the area were made in 1809 to William Neale, Joshua Alliot, all previously soldiers in the NSW Corps. As such, the area became known as "Soldier Flat".

In 1869, a rail platform was built on the old Neale grant and given the name Macquarie Fields Station after a property to the north. However, in 1881 the Macquarie Fields estate subdivided to become the new village of Macquarie Fields. The fact that the station was a long way from the village caused confusion so a new name was sought for the station and Ingleburn was chosen in 1883. One theory has it was named after a local house formerly owned by Mary Ruse, daughter of pioneer James Ruse. Other records indicate it was named after a British town although the corresponding town has not been identified. Ingleburn is Scottish for "bend in the river", referring to the significant bend in the nearby Georges River.

The village of Ingleburn was established in 1885 when the land owned by a developer called Fitz Stubbs was subdivided. A public school was opened in 1887. Ingleburn Post Office opened on 15 November 1886. By 1896, the town was large enough to have its own municipal council. Town improvements such as street lights and water did not arrive until after World War I. In 1948 the council was merged with the City of Campbelltown Council.

In 1969, a large area west of the railway line was rezoned to become an industrial estate. Protests from local residents saw the plan halted temporarily but within ten years, the west side of the town had become largely industrial and remains so to this day. More housing subdivisions were made on the outskirts of town in the 1970s including Housing Commission developments.

== Heritage listings ==
Ingleburn has a number of heritage-listed sites, including:

- Campbelltown Road: Ingleburn Military Heritage Precinct and Mont St Quentin Oval
- 196 Campbelltown Road: Robin Hood Farm

== Commercial areas ==
Ingleburn's central business district is adjacent to the railway station and includes two shopping centres called Ingleburn Village and Ingleburn Town Centre as well as a small shopping area on Lagonda Drive. In 2017 Ingleburn Mall was renovated and many new stores were added and relocated.

Ingleburn is the home of television playout centre MediaHub, a facility established through a joint partnership with WIN Television and ABC Television. Apart from the two networks, it also houses HD-ready playout for Seven, Imparja Television, and Fox International channels.

== Transport ==
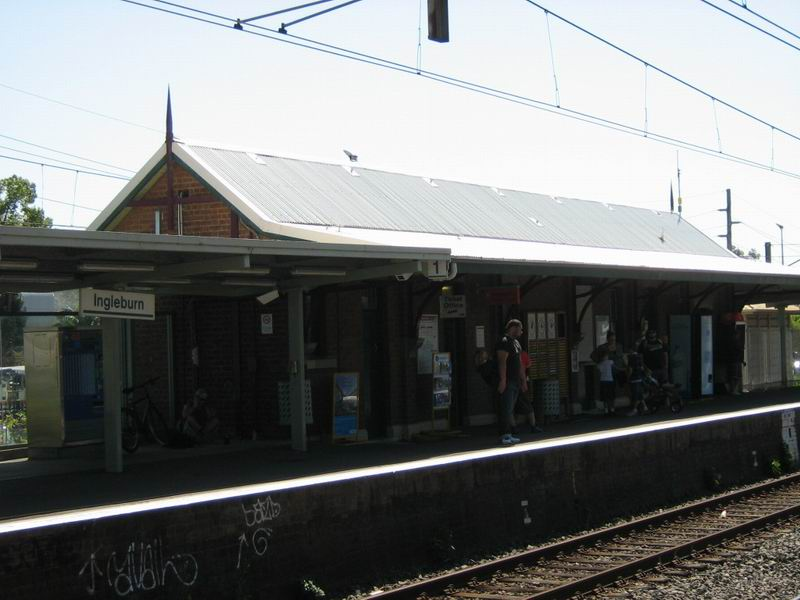
Ingleburn railway station

Ingleburn is home to the heritage-listed Ingleburn railway station. The station is on the Main Southern railway line.

Ingleburn is serviced by six Interline bus routes:

- 868 Ingleburn Station to Edmondson Park Station
- 869 Ingleburn Station to Liverpool Station
- 870 Campbelltown Hospital to Liverpool Station
- 871 Campbelltown Hospital to Liverpool Station
- 872 Campbelltown Hospital to Liverpool Station
- 873 Ingleburn Station to Minto Station

== Street names ==
Ingleburn has many themes for the naming of streets. Chester Road, Cumberland Road, Cambridge Street, Oxford Road, Suffolk Street, Carlisle Street, Norfolk Street Raglan Avenue, Belford Street, Salford Street and Phoenix Avenue were some of the first streets in the town and are named after English localities.

Birds are another theme with the main thoroughfares Warbler Avenue, Lorikeet Avenue, Currawong Street, Kingfisher Street, Oriole Place, Wagtail Crescent and Kookaburra Street, and smaller streets named after the magpie, jabiru, falcon, lark, ibis, dove, egret, kestrel, swift, heron, miner, jacana, honeyeater, lyrebird, whistler, fantail, swallow, sitella, brolga, swan, owl, quail, and triller.

There is also a car theme with Lancia Drive, Lagonda Drive, Bugatti Drive, Mercedes Road, Maserati Drive and Peugeot Drive becoming main thoroughfares and Fiat, Ferrari, Cadillac, Ford, Alfa, Renault, Rambler, Vauxhall, Buick, Leyland, Delaunay, Daimler, Stutz, Morgan, Sunbeam Place, Pontiac Place, Chevrolet Place, Delage Place and Oldsmobile Place being named after cars too.

== Schools ==
- Ingleburn Public School
- Ingleburn High School
- Sackville Street Public School
- Holy Family Primary School

== Parks and recreation ==
Milton Park, shared by the boundaries of Ingleburn and Macquarie Fields is a popular venue for football and softball teams. It is also used as the presentation area for the annual Ingleburn Alive festival's evening fireworks.

Other sporting parks include Wood Park, behind Ingleburn High School where rugby league and cricket are played.

Smaller recreational reserves and parks are located between Kingfisher Road and Currawong Street, on Matthew Square, on Currawong Street behind Holy Family Catholic School and another behind Sackville Street Public School.

Memorial Oval can also be found on the western side of the railway line adjacent to the Ingleburn RSL Club.

Ingleburn RSL is located on Chester Road.

== Demographics ==
At the 2021 Australian census, there were 15,264 residents in Ingleburn. 52.5% of people were born in Australia. The next most common countries of birth were Bangladesh 5.4%, India 5.3% Philippines 4.2%, Nepal 4.1% and New Zealand 2.6%. 52.1% of people spoke only English at home. Other languages spoken at home included Bengali 7.2%, Hindi 4.8%, Tagalog 2.5% and Arabic 2.0%. The most common responses for religion were Catholic 22.1%, No Religion 19.5%, Islam 11.7%, Anglican 10.2% and Hinduism 9.7%.

== Notable people ==
- Joe Kelly, politician
