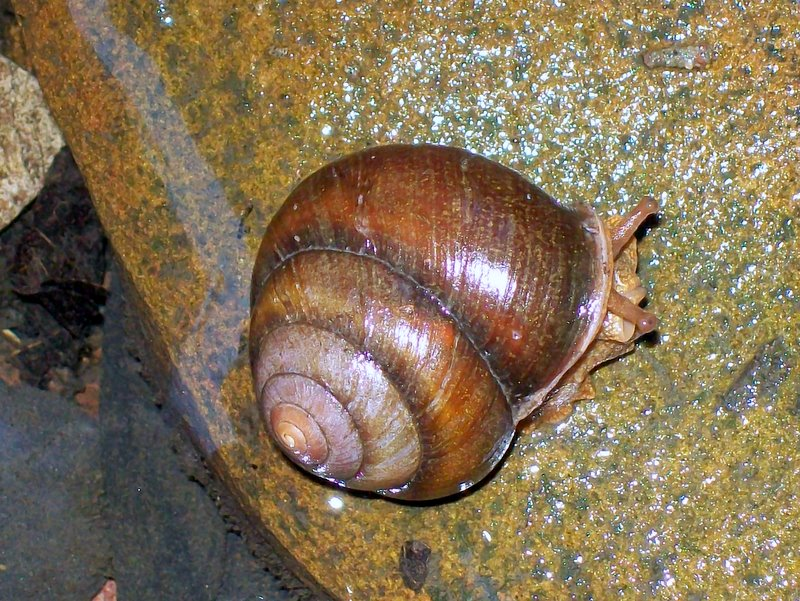

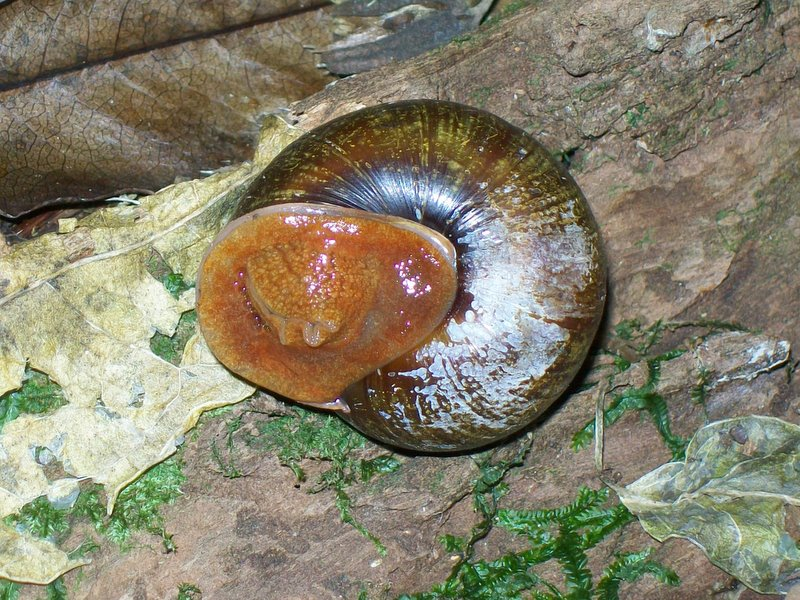

Scientific classification
- Kingdom: Animalia
- Phylum: Mollusca
- Class: Gastropoda
- Order: Stylommatophora
- Family: Camaenidae
- Genus: Meridolum
- Species: M. gulosum

Binomial name
- Meridolum gulosum Gould, 1846

= Meridolum gulosum =

Species of gastropod

Meridolum gulosum is a species of air-breathing land snail, terrestrial pulmonate gastropod mollusk in the family Camaenidae. This species is endemic to Australia.

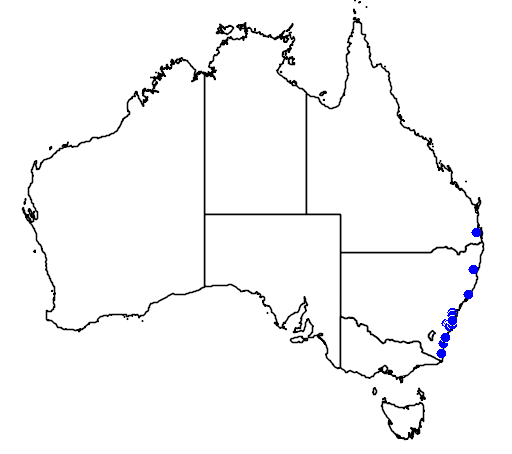
Distribution map of Meridolum gulosum

Type locality, originally given by Gould 1852 as “Illawarra, New South Wales”.

Meridolum gulosum is restricted to the rainforests and vine thickets of the Illawarra Escarpment south of Sydney. Ranging from Bulli Pass almost as far south as Wollongong. Meridolum gulosum is found under fallen palm fronds, wood, against rocks, bark and other debris and in leaf litter on the forest floor.

Recent research has indicated that Meridolum marshalli is genetically no different from Meridolum gulosum.
