= Charles Throsby Smith =

Australian explorer and pioneer settler

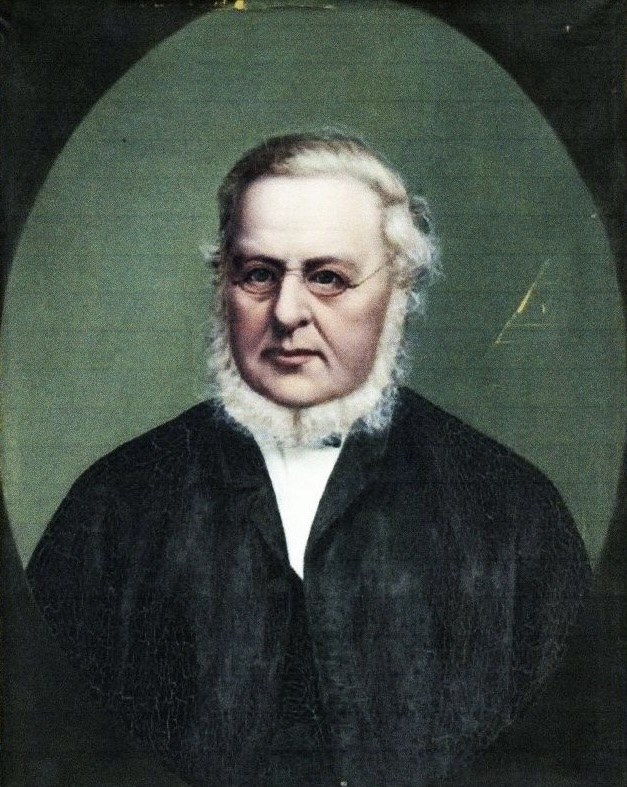
- Born: 1 March 1798; Leicester, England
- Died: 25 September 1876 (aged 78); Wollongong, New South Wales
- Other name: Charley
- Known for: Exploration in New South Wales and pioneer settlement in Wollongong
- Spouse: Sarah Broughton

Charles Throsby Smith (1 March 1798 – 25 September 1876) was an English-born Australian explorer who led the first British expedition to what became Canberra, and a pioneer settler whose land grant became Wollongong. He played a significant role during the settlement's first few decades, making him a founding figure for the city.

== Early life ==
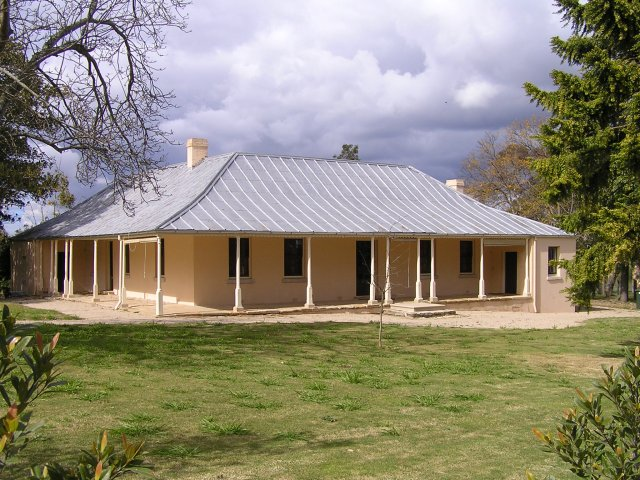
Glenfield Farm, where Smith resided with his uncle upon arriving in Australia

Smith was born in Cambridge, England on 1 March 1798, to parents Martha Throsby of Leicester and Joshua Smith of Norfolk. He lost his father in his youth and thereafter went to sea at the age of sixteen. This brought him to Sydney, where he landed on 16 April 1816.

He resided for periods with his uncle Charles Throsby of Glenfield Farm before twice resolving to sail again, first to the South Pacific on the Daphne and then later to Calcutta, India. Once there, he intended to join his brother, who commanded a ship of his own. However, his brother had died months before his arrival.

After some time in Calcutta, during which Smith assisted his deceased brother's widow and his sister in settling his brother's affairs, he sailed from Bombay back to Sydney via Madras, landing in November 1819.

Smith attained permission from Governor Lachlan Macquarie to settle in the colony. He secured a 120 ha (300 acres) land grant on the Illawarra around the same time.

== Exploration ==
In 1820, an expedition to explore the country south of Lake George was commissioned by Smith's uncle Throsby, on instructions from the Governor. It was led by Smith, consisting also of the emancipists James Vaughan and Joseph Wild.

The party, the first to reach the Limestone Plains, were the first Europeans to discover limestone in Australia. Over the course of December 1820, they visited the eastern portion of Ginninderra, crossed the Molonglo and Queanbeyan Rivers and climbed Black Mountain.

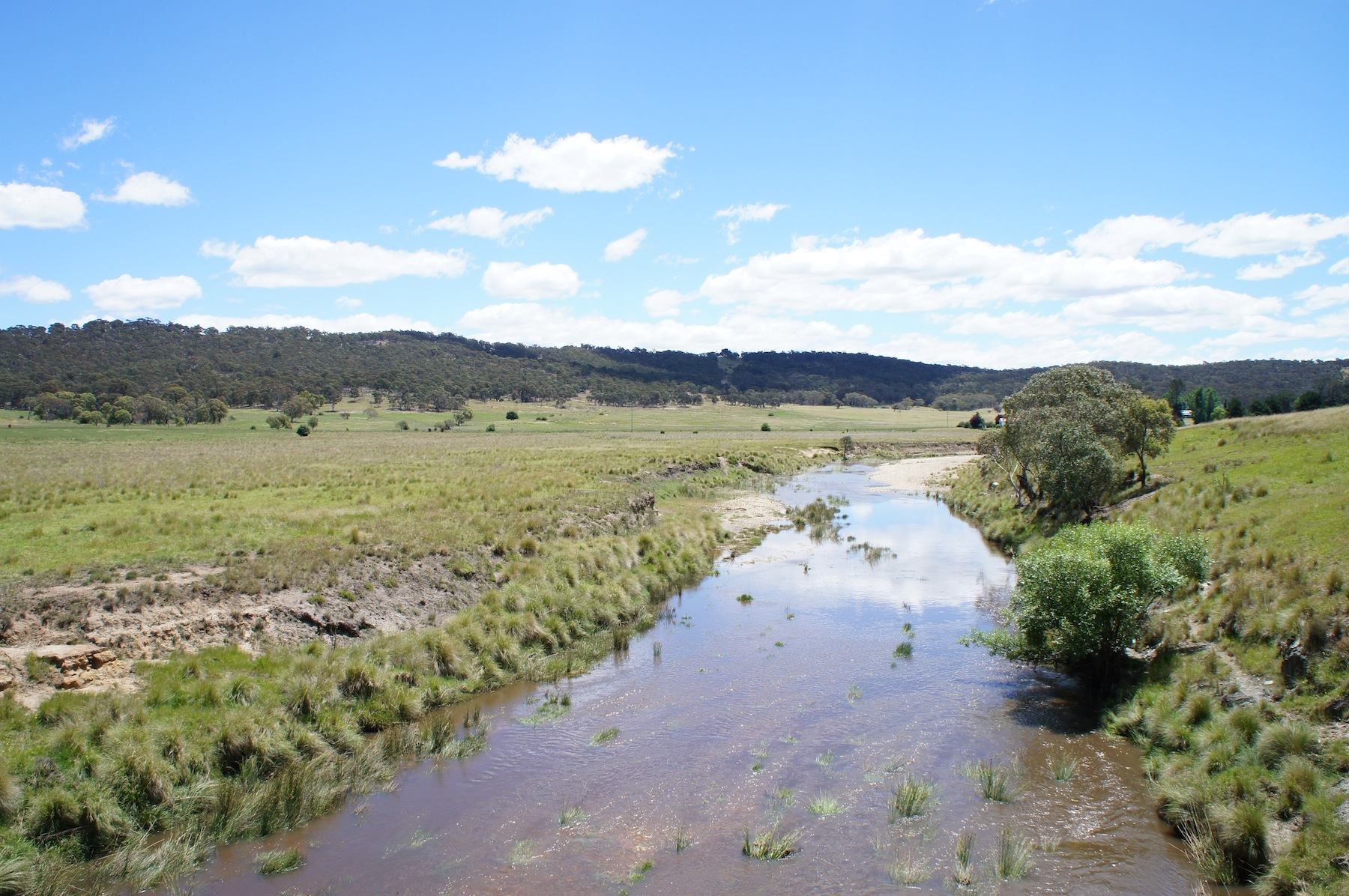
The Molonglo River

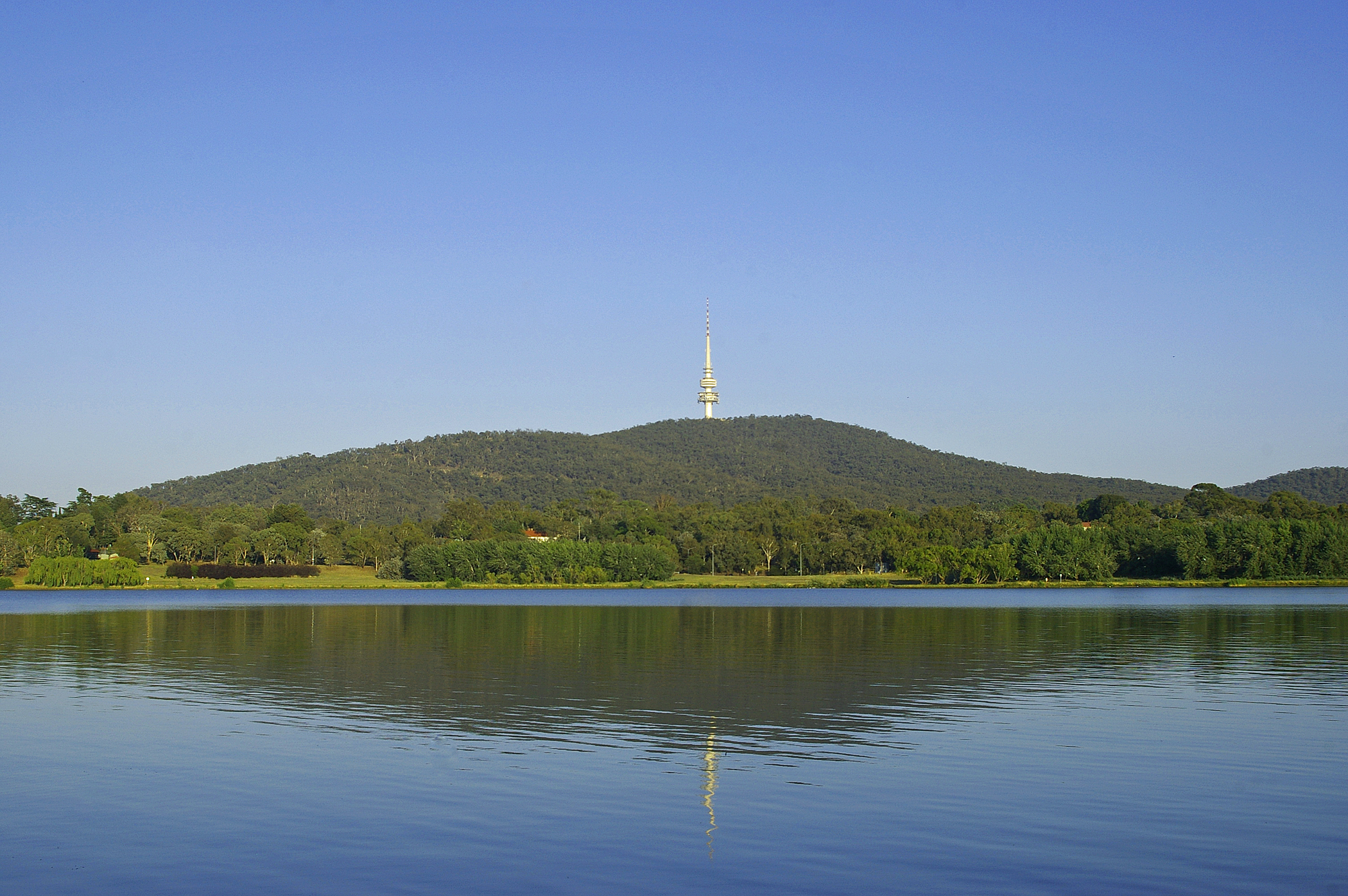
Black Mountain in Canberra

They had been instructed by Charles Throsby to locate the Murrumbidgee River; this they did not do.

Smith took up residence near Appin a short time after the expedition.

== Settlement in the Illawarra ==
Having settled down for the meantime, Smith's attention turned to his Illawarra property, which he named The Five Islands (later Bustle Farm). He commenced clearing land, being the first to do so within the South Coast districts, "in defiance of the blacks, who, at times, were disposed to be very troublesome." He recounted, "I always, however, treated them with great kindness and we soon became great friends."

In 1823, he married Sarah Broughton, the daughter of emancipist Ann Glossop – a victim of the Boyd massacre – and magistrate William Broughton, who came out on the First Fleet. The newly-weds moved to the estate in the same year with four government-assigned convicts, becoming the first settlers in the area.

A barn on the property, located near Wollongong Harbour, became the first local schoolhouse in 1826, and then the first church in 1828. In 1834, the estate was selected for the establishment of the Wollongong township, and was surveyed by Thomas Mitchell.

Smith had another grant nearby, consisting of 1,280 acres and named Calderwood. He never resided upon it, and eventually sold it to neighbouring landowner Henry Osborne.

Sarah Smith died in 1838, aged 39. Charles married twice more thereafter.

== Local figure ==
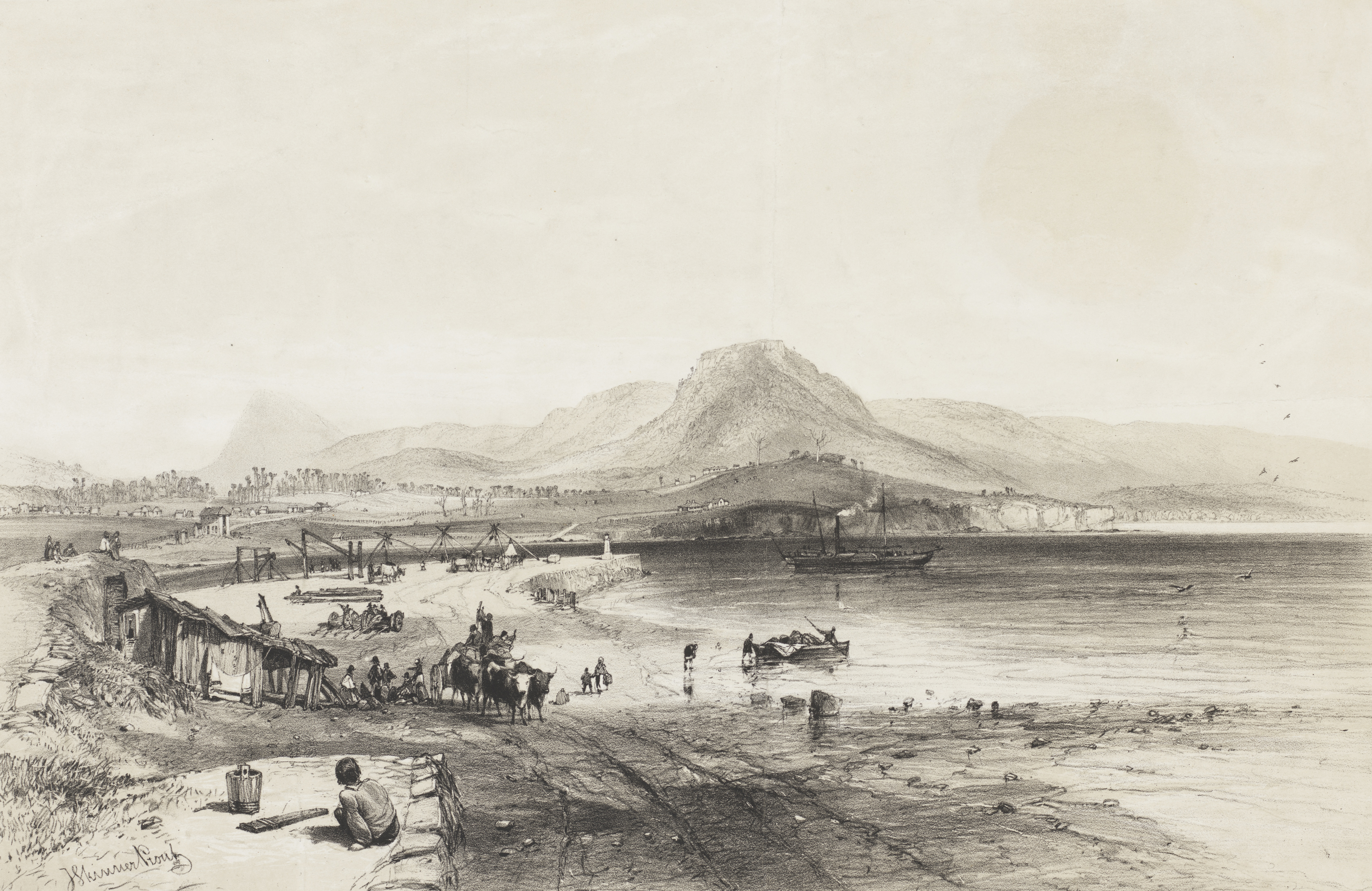
Wollongong, c. 1843

Smith was on the Committee of Management for the Illawarra Steam Packet Company, which secured a steamship service to Wollongong in 1839. In 1842, he purchased the steamer Sophia Jane for use as a regular trading vessel between Sydney and Wollongong. She was wrecked in 1845, re-floated and subsequently laid up, with her engine installed in the Phoenix.

He was involved in local politics, serving first as a member of the Illawarra District Council. Upon the Municipality of Wollongong's establishment in 1859, he was elected as an alderman. In 1868, he was elected mayor.

Smith was sworn in as a magistrate in 1844. In 1868, he was appointed Visiting Justice of the Wollongong Gaol.

He donated land to several denominations, including the land upon which St. Michael's Church was built.

Smith resided on his Wollongong grant for the entirety of his life from 1823, except during a trip to Britain in 1840 and 1841.

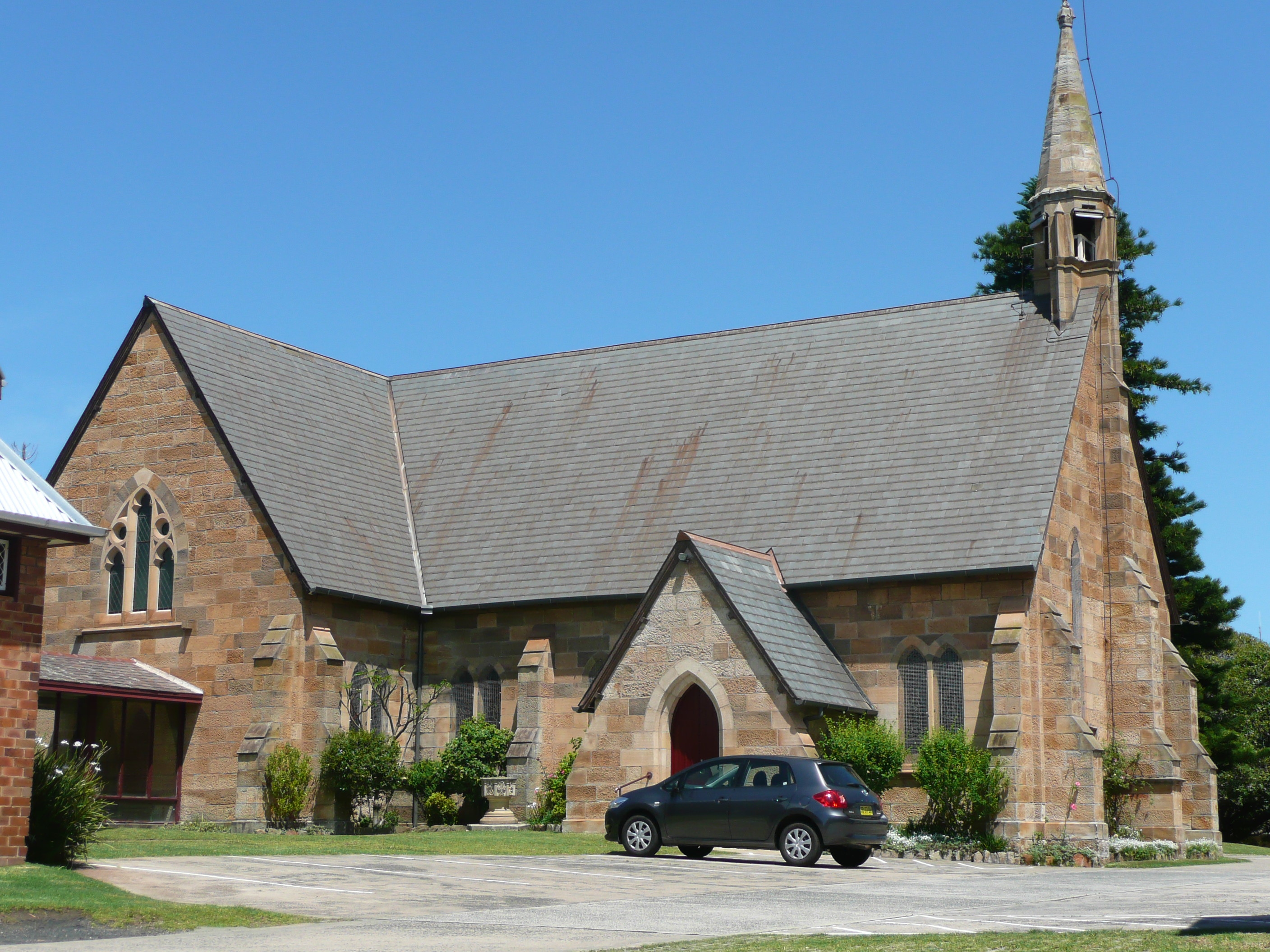
St. Michael's Cathedral, upon land donated by Smith

== Death and commemoration ==
Smith died on 25 September 1876, having contracted gangrene. His obituary in the Illawarra Mercury commented on the early part he played in the development of the South Coast:

Prior to his death, Mr. Smith was not only the "oldest inhabitant" of this district, but, what was still more remarkable and interesting, his residence at Wollongong was coeval with the history of the settlement of Illawarra and the whole of the South Coast districts from its very earliest date.

He was, the obituary continued, "strong, robust, active, and energetic, and in disposition and demeanour was genial, kindly, affable, and agreeable toward all with whom he came in contact, no matter whether they were crowned with prosperity or were penniless paupers." His funeral was well-attended by members of all classes from across the district.

He had seven daughters and three sons. Charles, Sarah and other members of the Smith family are interred at the Pioneer Park Cemetery in Wollongong.
