= St Michael's Cathedral, Wollongong =

St Michael's Cathedral
- Cathedral Church of Saint Michael the Archangel
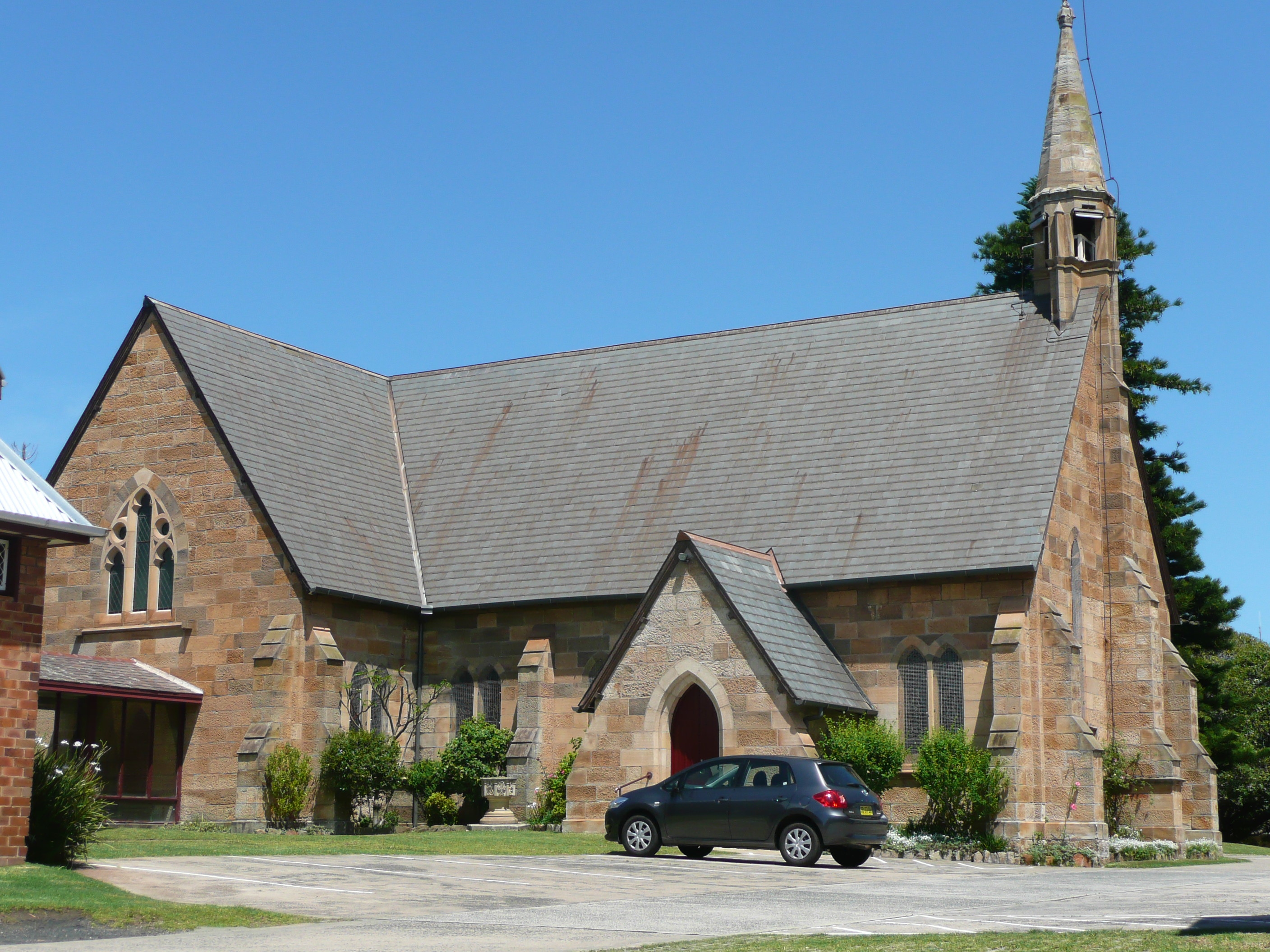
- St Michael's Cathedral, pictured in 2009
- St Michael's Cathedral
- 34°25′25″S 150°53′42″E
- Location: 74 Church Street, Wollongong, New South Wales
- Country: Australia
- Denomination: Anglican Church of Australia
- Website: wollongonganglican.org

History
- Former name: St Michael's Church
- Status: Church (1847–1970); Pro-Cathedral (since 1970)
- Founded: 1858
- Dedication: Saint Michael the Archangel
- Dedicated: 1847 (in Corrimal Street)
- Consecrated: 1859 (as a church); 1970 (as a pro-Cathedral)

Architecture
- Functional status: Active
- Architect: Edmund Blacket
- Style: Victorian Gothic Revival
- Years built: 1858–1859

Specifications
- Materials: Sandstone; timber

Administration
- Diocese: Sydney

Clergy
- Bishop: Peter Hayward
- Rector: Rev Canon Mark Smith

New South Wales Heritage Register
- Official name: St Michael's Cathedral & Rectory
- Type: Built
- Criteria: not defined
- Designated: 2 April 1999
- Reference no.: 00602

St Michael's Cathedral is a heritage-listed Anglican cathedral at Church Street, Wollongong, City of Wollongong, New South Wales, Australia. It is the principal Anglican church in the city of Wollongong and the mother-church of the Bishop of Wollongong (an assistant bishop in the Anglican Diocese of Sydney). It was designed by Edmund Blacket and built from 1858 to 1859. The property is owned by the Anglican Church Property Trust. It was added to the New South Wales State Heritage Register on 2 April 1999.

== History ==
=== Early European history of the area ===
Aboriginal communities were present in the area, and first encountered Europeans in 1796. From the 1810s, cedar cutters operated in the Illawarra escarpment rainforests as the first European industry in the area.

Dr Charles Throsby used the coastal Illawarra grasslands as cattle fodder in 1815, opening the area to European settlement. He focused his herd behind the fresh water lagoon, then situated at the junction of the current day Harbour and Smith Streets where he built a stockman's hut and cattle yards.

The first settlement in the area now known as Wollongong was by Charles Throsby Smith, nephew of Throsby. He was one of the first to receive a land grant in the district and in 1822 was the first to settle on his 300-acre parcel. Smith's barn, located near Wollongong harbour, became the first school house in 1826 and then church building in 1828. A military presence was established in the area now known as Port Kembla in 1826. They were relocated to the area now known as Wollongong in 1830. They were replaced by a local magistrate in 1833. This activity was focused around the harbour. In 1834 Smith's land was nominated as the site for the township to be known as Wollongong.

In 1834 Surveyor General Major Thomas Mitchell surveyed the town with the centrepiece of land devoted to the Church of England. As there was no Crown land in Wollongong, Throsby Smith sold his land to the Government, and it was transferred to the church. The surveyed town was bounded by streets to be known as Harbour, Keira and Crown Streets. The St Michael's site was the centrepiece of the town layout.

=== St Michael's Church ===
St Michael's Church was built in 1859 and designed by Edmund Blacket for a church community that was small but had expectations of substantial growth. Serving a large region originally isolated by topographic constraints, St Michael's has served Wollongong throughout the most significant phases of the region's development. A focus of community activity and endeavour throughout that growth, the church has substantially contributed to the character of the township that was to become New South Wales' third largest city, and one of the main industrial centres of Australia.

Wollongong expanded in the 1880s and the railway which finally linked the area to Sydney, encouraged movement away from Mitchell's plan. The relative isolation of the Illawarra ended in 1888 when the Illawarra railway was finally introduced to link the area to Sydney. The town was transformed from a focus on the wharves to one on the railway and began to expand away from St Michael's central position. The rail allowed the area to ship milk, coal and coke to Sydney city, expanding Wollongong city's potential enormously.

Reverend Elder succeeded Reverend Ewing in 1892. At his arrival, the press began agitating for an on-site rectory. Dean Ewing had lived in "Cormiston" (demolished after 1960) which was possibly designed by Blacket. Despite the hardship of the times – the 1890s had brought years of depression to Australia – and no funds, the church bowed to the pressure and built the rectory in 1893–1894. A Mr Bevan completed the building. There is no mention of its architect.

By the turn of the century a smelting works and number of coke oven batteries were opened and the town's population rose from 1635 in 1881 to 3545 in 1901 (an average growth rate of 3.9%). A second and worse mining disaster occurred in 1902, when the Mount Kembla mine exploded, killing 96 men and boys, possibly Australia's worst land disaster. A state military funeral was held at St Michael's for Major MacCabe, who died rescuing trapped miners. Changes to mining practices were implemented as a result of this disaster and the Bellbird Mine disaster of 1923. More significantly, the unions were strengthened and formed the Miners' Federation in 1908. The strike of 1909 brought a rebuke in the form of the Industrial Disputes Amendment Act and prosecution of the Miners' leader, but over the next 20 years the miners would win improved conditions.

Elder's successor enjoyed a better period when the city was expanding its industrial base. Revered D'Arcy Irvine encouraged expansion of the parish and formation of new parishes. A conservative Anglican, he enjoyed the warm support of the Wollongong church. He left Wollongong in 1907 with a large and growing congregation, and would go on to become a widely loved Bishop Coadjutor of Sydney.

Irvine's successor entered at the end of the term of the great administrator, Bishop Saumarez Smith's 19 years as Archbishop. Smith had been unable to resolve growing enmity between the Evangelicals and the Anglo-Catholics throughout this time. The incoming Reverend Lampard was regarded as something of an "extreme" Evangelical by the Anglo-Catholic group of the "Church Association", sufficiently so to motivate them to warn the congregation of St Michael's before his arrival. Lampard inherited a strong congregation from Irvine.

This time of expansion found expression in the Church Hall built on the corner of the site in 1908. In addition the rectory was fitted with the newly developing technologies, the telephone (1907) and town water (1909). The 1908 Hall is well built and true to the period, enhances the church by its form and siting without attempting to compete. The two form a strong urban relationship within the site and the hall's significance is derived more from its relationship with the church than its own individual merit. It features an interesting ceiling structure with exposed ornate trusses. It has been damaged by later work, and division of the building into offices makes appreciation of the interior difficult.

In 1909 the Church sold the Corrimal Street site and the Glebe land to the south to the city. They used the funds to make "extensive alterations" to the interior of St Michael's. These involved raising of the east end of the church, extension of the chancel platform, raising the choir stalls, with a step for the holy table, purchase and installation of a cedar reading desk and clergy seat. 1908 was a time of crisis between the two leading ideologies within the Church of England, concerning vestments of priests and formality of the liturgy.

At the end of Reverend Stubbin's ministry in 1922, Wollongong had all the hallmarks of a town about to grow into a very large city. Archbishop John Wright looked to put a strong Evangelical into the parish to see it through this growth. He found Reverend Knox, an outspoken Evangelical who had spent 10 years ministering in the High Church world of Adelaide. A highly intelligent and fine expository speaker, Knox confounded Wright's strategy by exchanging parishes with Reverend Walker of Chatswood in 1924, which led him to a leading role in Diocesan affairs. Knox initiated the second hall on the Wollongong site and whilst gathering funds found he was losing the struggle against inertia to achieve its completion before he left. His son Broughton Knox went on to become principal of Moore College, Sydney.

The period between 1900 and 1920 was one of substantial growth for the Illawarra region. Whilst the population of the area that is now Wollongong city easily outstripped all but Sydney and Newcastle in size, the area was still characterised by pockets of population over a wide area and was not rated as a NSW city. In 1907 the population was 17.172, large by NSW standards of the time. In 1911 it was 24.940 and in 1920 32.381, a sustained growth rate of 3.7% and 2.6%.

The 1940s boundary sandstone fences and retaining walls were dedicated as a memorial. A plaque is located in the northern boundary fence adjacent to the site entrance. Portable sandstone benches (also memorials) are located within the landscape to the south of the cathedral.

The one hundredth anniversary of the foundation stone ceremony in 1958 saw improvements to the church and the construction of the curate's cottage.

The growth of Wollongong in the post-war period is astonishing. The city grew from 62,960 in 1947 to 90,852 in 1954 (5.4%), and 131,754 in 1961 (5.5%). Wollongong was by this time amongst Australia's largest cities. In 1962 the role of Archdeacon became a separate position from Rector and Rural Dean, and Reverend Pitt was appointed Archdeacon of Wollongong. With two senior ministers overseeing the Illawarra region, the Sydney Synod purchased the Wollongong Fire Station for use in diocesan activities in Wollongong. St Michael's began work with the local court, and the curate became part-time Court Chaplain. A drop-in centre was initiated, a Home Mission Society opportunity shop opened and an aged-persons home was opened.

The grant of land to the Church of England made in 1842 was subdivided in 1963 and the corner of the site was leased to a service station. The site was consciously set apart in Mitchell's survey plan and this subdivision and development was a disturbing change to the urban environment of the historical part of Wollongong.

In 1967 some significant work was carried out to the church buildings. Funded by the lease of the service station, the most obvious change was the blonde brick kindergarten extension to the 1925 hall, originally built as a space to hold regional gatherings.

=== St Michael's Pro-Cathedral ===
St Michael's was inaugurated as a pro-cathedral in 1970.

The church was forced to relocate its rector away from the site in the 1980s as the lack of security was becoming untenable. It leased the curate's cottage for similar reasons. Canon Graham's ministry at St Michael's spanned 1984–1891. He worked under Bishop Harry Goodhew (1982–93) throughout his term. The pressure of the enlarged ministry at St Michael's appears to have reached its zenith in the mid 1980s. The number of proposals for the site increased and the resolution of property issues was high on the agenda. The main focus in the change of buildings was the possibility of a new cathedral building, funded by commercial development on the site. The focus of the brief was now overtly Evangelical, the "immediacy" of the congregation needed to be greater than that possible in the old church. The new building needed to be sufficiently flexible to provide an intimate area as well as cater for very large services. The main motivation however was that the church wanted something in keeping with the concept of a cathedral.

In 1985 Wollongong City Council zoned the service station portion of the site with a plot ratio of 1.5:1. This was used as the basis for commercial proposal for the west end of the site.

The 1986 population of Wollongong fell from 176,100 in 1984 to 173,550. Despite this the 1980s was a time of high property demands and many controversial high rise developments ensued.

The remarkably intact church building became a Cathedral at the centre of a regional Anglican Diocese in 1982 and continues its prominent role in the life of the surrounding community.

In the mid 1980s Wollongong City Council threw its weight behind a drive for tourism to reduce the city's dependence on coal and steel. Income from tourism doubled between 1983 and 1985. An international hotel opened in 1983 and major conference facilities were completed in 1989, A leisure precinct was developed along the beachfront, the harbour was redeveloped, cycleways introduced and a heritage trail and drive were promoted in 1988. The council's Cityplan also aided construction of the Crown Gateway Shopping Centre (1986), Wollongong Mall (1987) and Council Administration Building and Performing Arts Centre (1988).

The mid-1980s proposals for the St Michael's site spanned a range of ideas including: liturgical reordering of the historic church, small extensions, multiple galleries with greatly increased seating, reworking the offices in the 1908 hall with an upper floor, additions to the 1925 hall, demolition of the 1908 hall, construction of a large modern cathedral against the historic (but decommissioned) cathedral, and numerous designs for commercial buildings on the west of the site. All had impacts on the place's significance but none proceeded past the draft stage. The church began to firm up on the idea of selling a portion of the site for a commercial venture, and put in train the necessary feasibility studies.

Reinforcing the problems of the old church, the 1859 floor was replaced in 1987. Remnants of the rotted structure are displayed in the south porch.

In the 1980s camellias (Camellia japonica cv.s) were installed at the base of the cathedral walls commemorating past congregation members.

In recognition of its prominent place in NSW's history, a Permanent Conservation Order was placed on St Michael's Cathedral in 1988. The Anglican Property Trust objected to the order, stating that in their opinion only the 1859 church was of significance and outlining the commercial proposal at risk. The Heritage Council in December 1988 modified the order boundaries to suit the development and exempted all buildings except the cathedral and former rectory.

The listing has since been transferred to the NSW State Heritage Register making the NSW Heritage Council the consent authority for works to the site. St Michael's congregation commissioned the Conservation Management Plan to guide management requirements and opportunities of the 1859 church building.

The Conservation Management Plan (CMP) was endorsed subject to conditions by the Heritage Council under delegated authority in October 2003.

In recent times church policy has been not to permit the installation of memorials in any format in the cathedral grounds.

== Description ==
=== Site ===
The site is within the locally significant Market Street heritage conservation area. It consists of the modern UOW Marketview Student Residence (originally an Ibis Hotel)in two connected pavilions bounding the western side, the 1925 hall and 1908 hall (now Church Offices) along the northern side; the cathedral on the middle of the eastern side facing Church Street, a garden area to the south-east corner featuring lawns, a mature Cook's pine (Araucaria columnaris), brush box (Lophostemon confertus) and Port Jackson fig (Ficus rubiginosa), the 1892 Rectory midway along the southern side, again surrounded by lawns.

The cathedral is sited at the high point of a hill and is visible for some distance along the east and west Market Street axis. The original town plan sited the St Michael's site as the focal point of long view corridors.

=== Church ===
What is now St Michael's Cathedral was originally constructed in 1859 as a church building. The church is a well proportioned stone Gothic building designed by Edmund Blacket to sit on the commanding hilltop site in the middle of Market Street, Wollongong. The Victorian Gothic Revival stone building has some aspects that were not typical of the standard rural parish designed by Blacket at the time, including bellcote and strong geometrical planning.

It is located centrally along the Market Street axis on a hilltop and set within a rectangular shaped block of 7,550 square metres (81,300 sq ft).

The church has a remarkably geometric influence, the plan being completely symmetrical with balanced porches and transepts, and the plan being seven bays of 4 metres (12 ft) long by two bays of 4 metres (12 ft) wide. The building is more pretentious than country parish churches, and the octagonal bell cote distinguishes it from more common parish churches that feature a rectangular bell cote.

The external sandstone is in remarkably good condition, predominantly due to the severity of the detailing. The interior has suspended timber floors, tongue and groove, which are generally sparrow-picked stone, with smooth faced stone around openings, indicating that the walls are not intended for render. The roof trusses sit on the unfinished stone block brackets. The reredos (panels behind the Holy Table) is fixed up against the internal stone wall. The windows to the nave and transepts all have Gothic paired "cusped lancets" with stained glass windows.

The doors are generally double timber ledged framed doors with cover strip made to fit the Gothic arches. Ceilings are raked. The roof frame consists of trusses formed from an arch beam with the roofing material being slate.

=== Other built elements ===
Other built elements on the site date from 1892 (rectory), 1908 (hall), 1925 (hall) 1958 (curate's residence) and 1967 (kindergarten), in addition to the Ibis Hotel, which now lines the entire western side of the block, and replaced the 1963 service station. Of these, the halls in particular have a strong relationship with the cathedral and form a strong urban setting in conjunction with it, which is recognised by current heritage listings.

=== Condition ===
The church is generally in good condition and is remarkably intact as was inspected on site in March 2001 by James Nicholson for Paul Davies Pty Ltd.

=== Modifications and dates ===
Throughout the entire period of the church's use of the site, the landscape has been characterised by change. Records indicate that buildings have taken precedence over landscape to support the growing congregation's operational needs as they developed over time.

Disturbances include the 1908 and 1925 halls' construction. The 1940s saw formalising of surrounding roads with kerbs and sealed pavements. Sandstone fences and retaining walls were installed on site boundaries, allowing flattening of steep gradients on the road verge and requiring removal of almost all of the significant early mature boundary trees. Formally placed plantings along the top of the eastern wall and randomly placed trees and shrubs were installed and removed during the ensuing period.

The 1980s saw planting of small shrubs, groundcovers and annuals, where prior to that plantings were generally limited to large trees in grassed open space. Site levels appear to have remained relatively constant in areas between cathedral and the two halls. The layout of the north–south vehicular thoroughfare and southern turning circle are elements that have remained from the original layout until the present. However the levels and surface treatments have undergone some alteration over time.

The open space between 1925/67 hall and 1859 rectory has been subject of various changes. Significant ground disturbance has occurred here in the following ways:

- 1960s–2000s installation and later removal of pre-school fencing;
- 2000s removal of large mature trees including roots;
- 2000s during construction of adjacent 150 room Ibis hotel immediately to west, construction of large retaining wall at western extent of area with associated drainage earthworks, ground level amendment for site construction office, installation of concrete path and new grass cover.

The latter site is where the proposed amphitheatre is to be constructed.

== Heritage listing ==
The prominent siting of St Michael's reflects the historic primacy of the Church of England in setting the direction for the Wollongong community, and the site remains a dominant landmark within a large metropolis. St Michael's built fabric and site development demonstrate the long-standing impact of the church upon its community. As the seat of the bishop in the Wollongong region of the Diocese of Sydney, the cathedral has associations with official recognition of the importance of the region to the state as a whole.

St Michael's rectors and parishioners have always had a strong association with the leaders of the Wollongong community. Since the time of Dean Ewing, many St Michael's rectors have had the responsibility of overseeing the church activities of the Illawarra region as Rural Dean.

St Michael's has had a strong association with the Church of England's national leadership. Bishops William Broughton, Frederic Barker, and Archbishops Saumarez Smith, John Wright and Howard Mowll all demonstrated a special and personal focus in the leadership and strategy for St Michael's, resulting in a church with strong ties to the Evangelical tradition within the Anglican Church. The perceptible upgrading of St Michael's importance in the post war period has created associations with some of the leading figures within the denomination. It has a special association with the retiring Sydney Archbishop Harry Goodhew who was rector, Archdeacon and Bishop of Wollongong.

Blacket's design for St Michael's has some unusual features and is amongst the earliest works where Blacket began to express his own architectural confidence. The church structure remains largely intact as built, and much of the interior remains as Blacket envisioned it. The building is a high quality and rare example of a Gothic parish church with a developed geometrical base in its symmetry and planning layout. Its quality reflects the optimistic character of the local community in 1858. the church is part of a larger grouping of significant buildings that combine to form the most prominent historic group of buildings in Wollongong, and one that compares with the better civic groups in country NSW.

St Michael's Cathedral, Wollongong was listed on the New South Wales State Heritage Register on 2 April 1999.

== See also ==
- List of Anglican cathedrals in Australia
- List of Edmund Blacket buildings
