= John Ingham (businessman) =

Australian businessman (1928–2003)

John Ingham AO
- Born: John Horace Ingham; 10 June 1928; Casula, New South Wales
- Died: 5 August 2003 (aged 75); Westmead Private Hospital, Westmead, New South Wales
- Occupations: Businessman: Poultry breeding and processing Racehorse owner and breeder
- Family: Bob Ingham (younger brother)

John Horace Ingham AO (10 June 1928 – 5 August 2003) was a leading Australian businessman and co-founder of the largest thoroughbred horse racing and breeding operation in Australia.

== Early years and career ==
Ingham was born in Casula, the son of farmer Walter Ingham, he was known as "Jack" from an early age. On his father's death in 1953, along with his brother, Bob, took over Inghams, a small family-run poultry breeding business founded in 1918. The brothers built the company into the largest producer of chickens and turkeys in Australia. Now headquartered in North Ryde, New South Wales, the operation has annual sales of more than A$1.5 billion and a workforce in excess of 6,000 people. At the time of his death in 2003, Jack Ingham was Joint Managing Director of the company.

== Thoroughbred horse racing ==
Ingham's father had had an interest in breeding horses and, in addition to the poultry business, the brothers also inherited a broodmare named Valiant Rose. The mare was a descendant of the great British racehorse Bend Or, an Epsom Derby winner and Champion broodmare sire. The Ingham brothers used Valiant Rose to begin building what became an A$250 million breeding and racing operation, the largest in Australia. Their equine empire included Woodlands Stud at Denman in the Hunter Valley, Crown Lodge racing stables at Warwick Farm Racecourse, Sydney and Carbine Lodge racing stables at Flemington Racecourse, Melbourne, plus racing stables in Adelaide and Brisbane.

The most famous of the Inghams' successful horses was Octagonal, the 1996 Australian Horse of the Year and a winner of multiple Group One races including the Cox Plate and the Australian Derby.

== Honours ==
In January 2003, Ingham was appointed an Officer of the Order of Australia for service to the poultry industry as a pioneer in research and development and establishment of world best practice standards, to the thoroughbred horseracing industry, and to the community. A long-time member of the executive committee of the Australian Jockey Club, in 2004 he was inducted posthumously to the Australian Racing Hall of Fame.

== Personal life ==
Ingham was married three times and had five children.

In 1996, Jack and his brother, Bob, were founding benefactors of the Ingham Institute for Applied Medical Research.

In 2003, at age seventy-five, Ingham died at Westmead Private Hospital, Sydney after a long struggle with leukemia. His funeral was held in St Andrew's Cathedral, Sydney.
