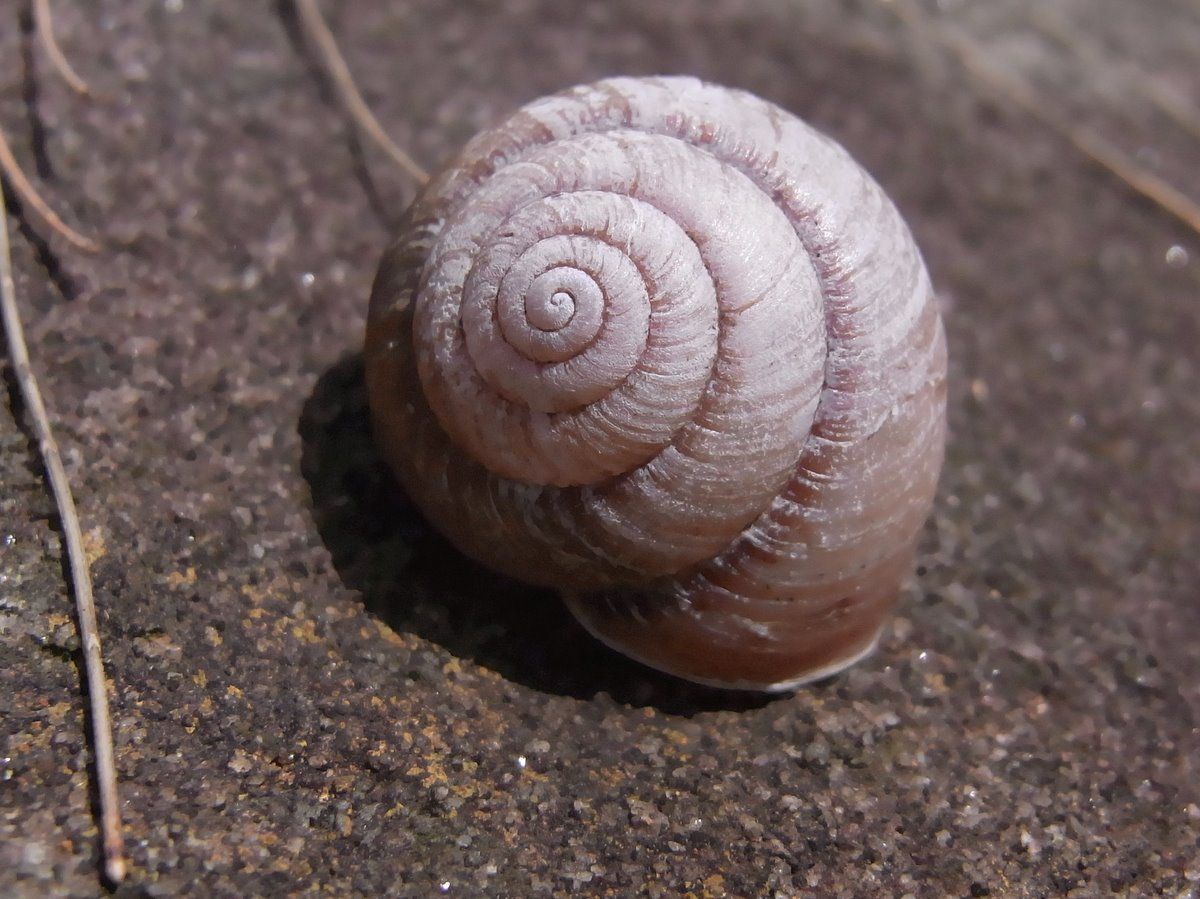
- An empty shell at Ku-ring-gai Chase National Park, Australia

Scientific classification
- Domain: Eukaryota
- Kingdom: Animalia
- Phylum: Mollusca
- Class: Gastropoda
- Order: Stylommatophora
- Family: Camaenidae
- Genus: Meridolum
- Species: M. middenense

Binomial name
- Meridolum middenense McLauchlan, 1954

= Meridolum middenense =

Species of gastropod

Meridolum middenense is a species of air-breathing land snail, a terrestrial pulmonate gastropod mollusk in the family Camaenidae. This species is endemic to Australia.

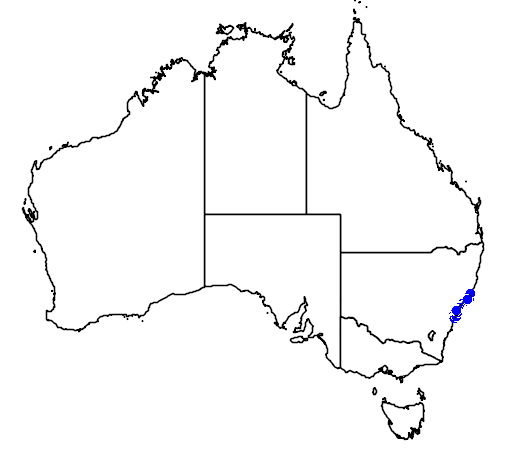
Distribution of Meridolum middenense

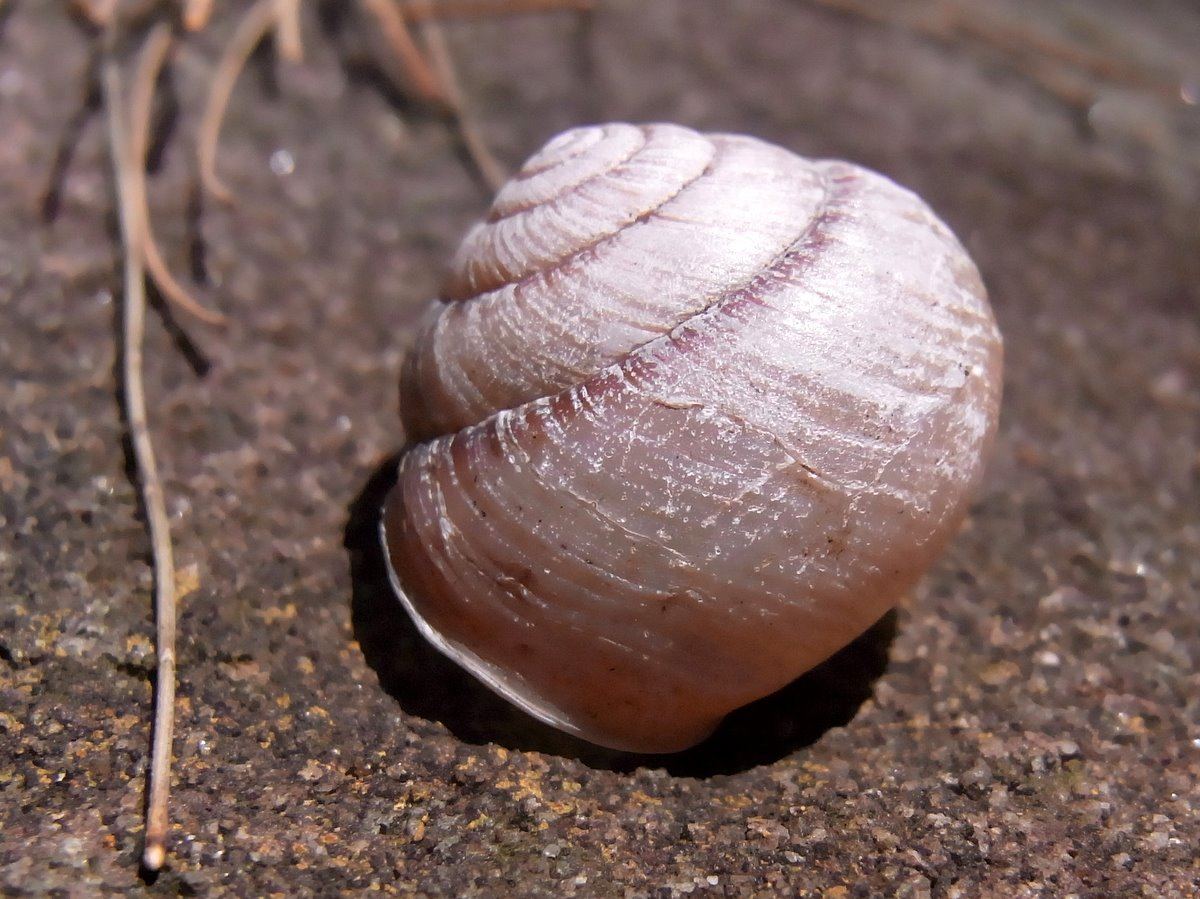
An empty shell of Meridolum middenense, in a She-oak forest above Resolute Beach, Ku-ring-gai Chase National Park, Australia

== Ecology ==
This species lives in open forests in the leaf litter.
