= Meridolum depressum =

Conservation status
- Vulnerable (IUCN 2.3)

Scientific classification
- Kingdom: Animalia
- Phylum: Mollusca
- Class: Gastropoda
- Order: Stylommatophora
- Family: Camaenidae
- Genus: Meridolum
- Species: M. depressum

Binomial name
- Meridolum depressum Hedley, 1901

Species of gastropod

Meridolum depressum is a species of air-breathing land snail, terrestrial pulmonate gastropod mollusk in the family Camaenidae. This species is endemic to Australia.

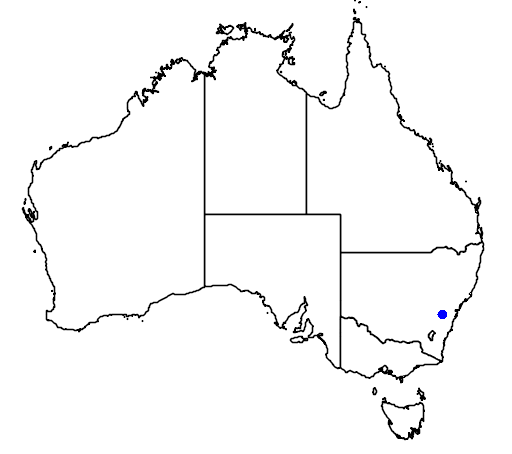
Distribution map of Meridolum depressum
