= Inghams =

Australian poultry producer

Ingham's

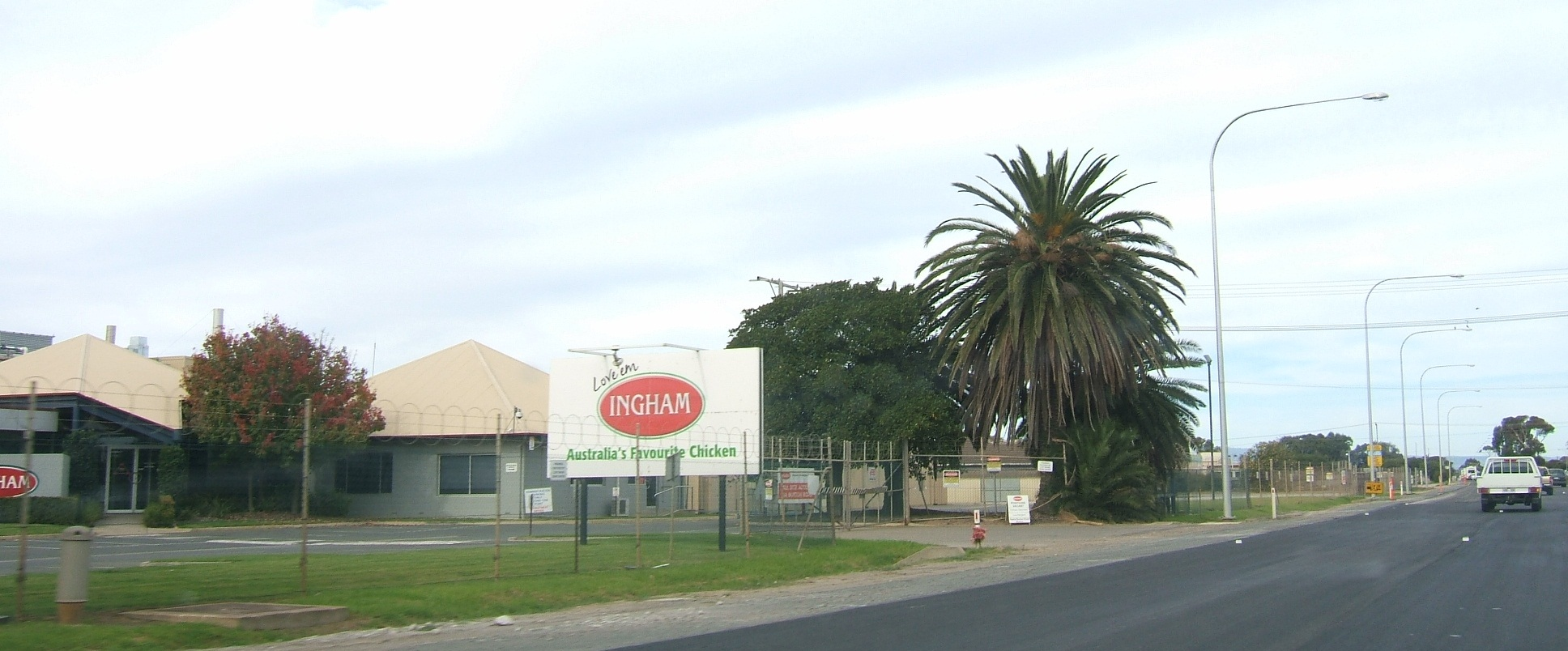
- Inghams poultry factory in Adelaide, South Australia
- Type: Public
- Traded as: ASX: ING
- Industry: Poultry
- Founded: 1918
- Headquarters: North Ryde, New South Wales, Australia
- Area served: Australia; New Zealand
- Key people: Andrew Reeves (CEO)
- Products: Processed chicken and turkey products and stockfeed
- Number of employees: 8,000
- Website: www.inghams.com.au

Ingham's is a supplier/producer of poultry and fodder across Australia and New Zealand. The company claims to be one of the largest producers of chicken and turkey products in Australia and employs in excess of 8,000 people in more than 100 locations in Australia and New Zealand. The company was founded in 1918 and was managed by members of the Ingham family from its establishment until 2014, including Walter Ingham and his two sons, Jack Ingham and Bob Ingham. TPG Capital acquired Ingham's in 2014 for A$880 million. Ingham's was listed on the Australian Securities Exchange in November 2016.

== Business activities ==
Ingham Enterprises, often called Ingham's, produce a range of foods for human and animal consumption that can generally be classified into poultry and non-poultry products.

=== Poultry products ===
Ingham's products are available in most Australian and New Zealand supermarkets. The company is also a large supplier to the hospitality and food service industry and schools with a range of chicken and turkey products, and egg-free products.

A range of chicken product lines are produced including fresh chicken cuts, such as chicken thighs, chicken breasts and chicken mince, amongst other fresh chicken lines. Products that are ready-to-cook include chicken kebabs, schnitzels, and a range of roasting portions that are typically available from most supermarket delis. Inghams also produce packaged chicken products for most supermarkets that are pre-packaged including drumsticks, thighs, breast filets, wings and mince. Ready-to-cook packaged products include the above items as well as chicken burger patties, chicken meatballs, and limited meal options. Items available from the supermarket freezer section include roasting chickens and a ready-to-cook Chicken Kiev. Processed chicken meat, into a roll, is also produced as a ready-to-eat line and available as a deli item.

Turkey product lines include fresh turkey meats in a range of cuts such as sausages, small roasts, steaks, wings, drumsticks, schnitzel and turkey mince. Ready-to-eat lines are either roasted or smoked and packaged. Frozen items include a whole turkey, buffé, or Kiev.

=== Non-poultry products ===
Ingham's claims to be the largest manufacturer of stockfeed in Australasia; with product lines for horses, pigs, and poultry.

== History ==
The company was founded in 1918 when Walter Ingham Sr. purchased 42 acres (170,000 m^{2}) of bush land in Casula as a gift to 18-year-old son, Walter Ingham. Walter Jr. embarked on a fruit and vegetable farming venture, eventually moving into the poultry business. Starting with just one cockerel and six hens, his flock quickly grew to 1,000 birds. On his death in 1953, his two sons, Jack and Bob Ingham took over the small breeding operation and built it into the largest producer of chickens and turkeys in Australia.

In the 1920s, as with most farmers during this time, Walter Ingham was self-sufficient and produced feed for his own poultry and horses. Most work was pre-mechanised, so back-breaking work included ploughing the fields. Due to a lack of meat during World War II, Inghams provided Australians with poultry products. Women contributed to the war effort by working on farms owned by the Ingham family.

In 1958, the company built first processing plant at Casula. By the early to mid-1960s, new styles and techniques of packaging and processing led to the company's involvement in the rapid process of expansion and development of the poultry industry. Ingham became a household name throughout Australia. In 1963, Ingham's had acquired 50% of A.A. Tegel turkey, and took the company over completely in 1994. In 1968 the first KFC restaurant opened in Sydney. In 1976, KFC and Ingham's aligned in a business partnership, providing new opportunities for both companies.

Acquisitions included Chickadee Food Pty Ltd (26 per cent in 1972); Harvey Farms in 1990, the number two chicken processor in New Zealand.

By the mid-1980s there was a dramatic shift to food processing creating a revolution for the poultry industry. The McDonald's chicken nugget product, developed by Tyson in the United States, was launched in Australia. By 1995, due to enormous popularity, Ingham's built a dedicated plant strictly to produce McDonald's nuggets.

In 2001, Ingham's established Murarrie poultry processing plant, the largest in the country with the most sophisticated machinery, production and supply chain technologies employing approximately 1,200 workers.

In 2008, the company officially cancelled their 'halal certification' status in Western Australia and is no longer supplying halal slaughtered chicken.

In May 2015, Ingham's agreed to pay $80,000 to the Lake Macquarie Council, after a ruptured tank resulted in 1,700 litres of chicken blood and offal to flow into local waterways the previous year.

In June 2026, Inghams locked down poultry farms in Western Australia and tightened biosecurity after H5N1 bird flu was detected in two migratory birds near Esperance, the first detection of the strain in Australia.

=== Family ===
In 2019, Ingham chicken heir Robby Ingham sold his South Coast oceanfront property Ocean Pines in Gerringong, for the highest auction result recorded on the NSW South Coast of $11.3 million through real estate agent Craig Pontey.

== Thoroughbred horses ==
The Ingham name is also synonymous with horses. The Ingham's passion for horseracing began during the days they'd spend with Walter Ingham at the race tracks. Along with the poultry business, the Jack and Bob Ingham also inherited Valiant Rose, which was a descendent broodmare of a champion British racehorse. In the 1960s, they began building their thoroughbred horse racing and breeding operations. This passion became the largest thoroughbred dynasty in Australia until Bob sold the entire operation in 2008.

Key events during these years included Bob Ingham purchasing his first two trotters in 1965. By 1970, Bob and Jack were the biggest trotting owners in Australia; and had 650 race wins by 31 July 1974.

In the late 1990s, the Ingham's most widely known thoroughbred horse, Octagonal, became a household name with 28 starts, 24 wins, 7 seconds and 1 third placement resulting in nearly A$6 million in earnings. In 1995–1996, it was voted Australian Champion Three Year Old and Australian Champion Racehorse of the Year.

During 2004 and 2005, Lonhro, son of Octagonal, had 35 starts with 26 wins, 3 seconds and 2 thirds, earning nearly the same amount as his father.

In 2008, divesting themselves of the equine interests, Dubai's Sheikh bought Inghams' thoroughbred horse breeding business, incorporating it into the Darley Stud.
