= Glenfield Farm =

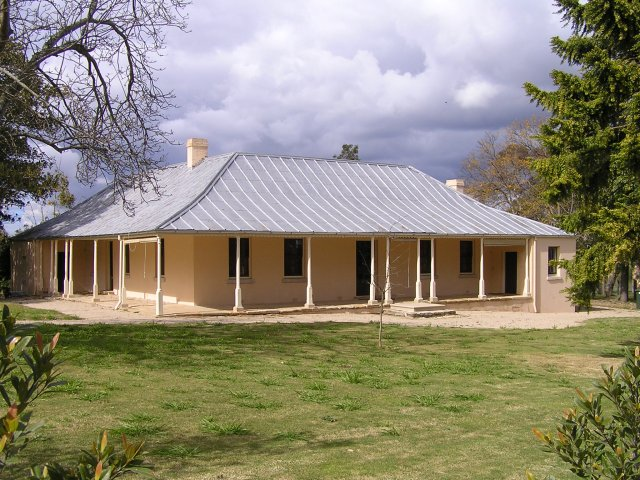

- Location within New South Wales Location within Australia
- 33.9584°S 150.9070°E
- Location: 88 Leacocks Lane, Casula, City of Liverpool, New South Wales, Australia

History
- Built: 1810–1817

Site notes
- Owner: Private owners

New South Wales Heritage Register
- Official name: Glenfield Farm
- Type: state heritage (landscape)
- Designated: 2 April 1999
- Reference no.: 25
- Type: Homestead Complex
- Category: Farming and Grazing
- Builders: Convict labour

Glenfield Farm is a heritage-listed homestead at 88 Leacocks Lane, Casula, New South Wales, a suburb of Sydney, Australia. It was built from 1810 to 1817 by convict labour. It was added to the New South Wales State Heritage Register on 2 April 1999.

== History ==
Charles Throsby arrived in New South Wales in 1802 as a surgeon on the transport Coromandel. He took the post of acting surgeon and magistrate at Castle Hill and was transferred to Newcastle in 1804, where he became commandant for four years.

In 1809 Throsby resigned from the positions of Assistant Colonial Surgeon and Magistrate. During this period he had established grazing in the Newcastle area. On 22 May 1811 Throsby was granted 950 acres of land (at Casula) which he named "Glenfield" after his birthplace, Glenfield, Leicestershire in England. The farmhouse was built in about 1817.

From March to April 1818, he travelled on a tour of discovery to Jervis Bay. Throsby's exploration included the discovery of the Wollondilly River, exploration of the country around Goulburn, the first visit of white men to the Federal Capital area and the cross country trek between Goulburn and Bathurst. The discovery of the headwaters of the Shoalhaven River and another route between the tableland of the Shoalhaven River and a possible route between the tableland and the coast of Jervis Bay are also attributed to Throsby.

In April and May 1819 Throsby undertook his tour to Bathurst through the Cow Pastures and in May 1819, Governor Macquarie offered him a grant of land as remuneration for services rendered in making important discoveries. So impressed was Macquarie with Throsby's explorations, that he offered him public tribute his zealous perseverance - and granted him 1000 acres of land in the Moss Vale area.

Throsby's nephew, also named Charles Throsby, arrived in New South Wales on the "Mangles" on 7 August 1820. He joined his uncle and took charge of Throsby Park on the Wingecarribee River (near present day Moss Vale).

On 19 August 1820, Joseph Wild (of Throsby's party and under his direction) discovered Lake George, and in 1821 Throsby made the first mention of the possibility of the Murrumbidgee River of which he had heard from Aboriginal people. In April 1821, Charles Throsby reached the Murrumbidgee somewhere in what is now the Australian Capital Territory.

Governor Macquarie made Throsby a magistrate of the territory in March 1821, with main jurisdiction over the new County of Argyle. He was also a member of the committee for the first Agricultural Society in Sydney. During this time, Throsby had been involved in financial troubles brought on by a 5,000 pound surety he had taken on behalf of Graham Blaxcell. Blaxcell absconded from the colony in 1817 and died on board ship, leaving Throsby at the mercy of the creditors.

Ten years' litigation ended in an adverse verdict for Throsby, who by 1828 was also affected by the drought and falling wool prices. In April 1825, Charles Throsby committed suicide at Glenfield Farm, aged 51.

Upon Throsby's death, nephew Charles inherited Glenfield, Throsby Park and other scattered parts of his uncle's properties. After Charles' death Glenfield Farm was passed down successive heirs in the Throsby-Broughton family.

In 1920 James Leacock purchased Glenfield Farm. In 1924 he married a Broughton and in 1930 they moved into Glenfield Farm after modifying the homestead to serve as a dual residence, accommodating himself and his wife in one half and his sister and mother in the other. This dual dwelling arrangement began in 1932.

James Leacock brought dairy farming to the Liverpool district. He formed the Hygienic Dairies Ltd at Concord in 1909 to supply Sydney with its first bottled milk. His idealism embraced many interests, ranging from organic farming to Aboriginal rights. He undertook many activities on the farm property which made Glenfield a meeting place for groups concerned for Australian and international justice and many humanitarian issues, including a place of work for conscientious objectors during the Vietnam War.

Leacock pursued the establishment of communal living, discussion centres and co-operative farming. The first serious co-operative was the Rural Homes (Glenfield) Co-operative Ltd, formed in 1951. In 1960 the co-operative went into insolvency. In 1970 the Glenfield Goodwill Co-operative Society was registered.

A decline in the co-operative spirit was brought to a head at the 1976 annual general meeting, when it was decided that the Co-operative should be terminated. However, the Co-operative adopted a more realistic landlord role and increased rents to near market levels. After the venture failed Leacock bought back the farm and approximately 14 acres on which he resided until his death in 1974. The residents at Glenfield Farm continued farming activities.

A 1977 student report by Mark Bullen & Ian McGilvray indicated that the vegetation associated with the estate was mostly confined to the ridge with cleared land used for grazing and market gardening to the east.

The Heritage Council of NSW commissioned Howard Tanner and Associates to carry out a measured survey and report, providing staged recommendations and proposals for the place's future use. Glenfield was found to be in an advanced stage of dilapidation, and following completion of the study a grant from the Heritage Conservation Fund enabled the first stage of repair works to be carried out. Architects Howard Tanner and Tim Throsby supervised the first stage of roof repairs which was completed in September 1983.

During repairs, photographic documentation was carried out and evidence was uncovered that confirmed the original sequence of construction. The original timber shingles had been overlaid during the 19th century by patent Morewood and Rogers galvanised iron sheets for tiles. These were either repaired or replaced and correct flashing details reintroduced. In the 1980s, the Glenfield Cooperative regularly opened the house for public inspection while drawing income from its farm activities.

The remaining estate was subsequently incorporated into a residential subdivision, with Leacock's Lane (named after the family of a previous owner, Jim Leacock) as its main circulation ring road (off the Hume Highway). A draft plan of management for Leacock Regional Park was commissioned in 1996.

In 2002-03, a federal heritage grant of $46,393 was awarded for urgent works. In 2003, the property was purchased by the NSW Department of Planning, and Mayne-Wilson & Associates prepared a conservation management plan for it.

The property was transferred to the NSW Historic Houses Trust in 2006, the first to be included in the then-new Endangered Houses Fund program. At that time, most of the site (5.518ha) was transferred to the National Parks and Wildlife Service for incorporation into the adjoining Leacock Regional Park, while 1.173ha was retained as part of the property.

The house was then restored by the Historic Houses Trust, including restoring and reconstructing original details, reconstructing the garden, improving water tanks and installing new wet areas and conveniences. The restoration won an AIA (Heritage) Architecture Award in 2008.

It was subsequently sold back to private ownership as a residence. In 2015, the new owners expressed public concern that the Moorebank Intermodal Terminal would impact the property, potentially making the house unlivable due to train noise.

== Description ==
Glenfield Farm is at Casula, located 5 km south of Liverpool and accessed by Leacock's Lane, off the Hume Highway. It is surrounded to the south and north by Leacock Regional Park, with the main Southern Railway and a large area of landfill to the east, and 1988 residential subdivision, fronting Leacock's Lane, to the west. The land to the east of the site consists of former rural pastures and the original site fencing.

The buildings on the property are located to the western part of the site on top of a ridge and contain a 14 room homestead, a dairy, coach house and privy. Glenfield comprises a complex of 4 historic brick buildings (an 1810-17 house, former single storey dairy, two storey stables and small privy), surrounded by shrubs and trees, sited on the eastern side of a ridge that slopes steeply to the east down to Glenfield Creek and the Georges River. Panoramic views from the site are afforded to the north, south and east over the river valley.

=== Homestead ===
The homestead is a Colonial Georgian convict-built homestead of 14 rooms with kitchen, pantry and cellar. The roof extends over the stone flagged verandahs on three sides and is supported on turned wooden columns. The wooden shingles of the original roof can still be seen under the iron. The house has brick cellars and two attic rooms with gable windows facing the prospect to the east.

The English Bond brickwork construction is of a very high quality, particularly evident in the cellars, where arches support the walls above. The bricks are made from local clay. The lime in both the mortar and render is made from crushed oyster shell, with the latter clearly visible.

The joinery throughout is cedar. There are six-panelled doors and French windows with small wooden panels at the base and small glass panes held in fine wooden glazing bars. The mouldings of the architraves and chimney pieces are typical of Colonial Georgian design.

=== Outbuildings ===
The Barn

"The barn is probably contemporary with the Glenfield Farm house and is closely associated with it. Its floor was renewed recently in hard brick. The ground floor contained a place for the family carriage with a workroom adjoining, where harness and tools could be kept and repaired. The upper floor provided dry storage space for hay and other stock feed...There is a dummy doorway and two windows." (in Kingston, 1990, 25).

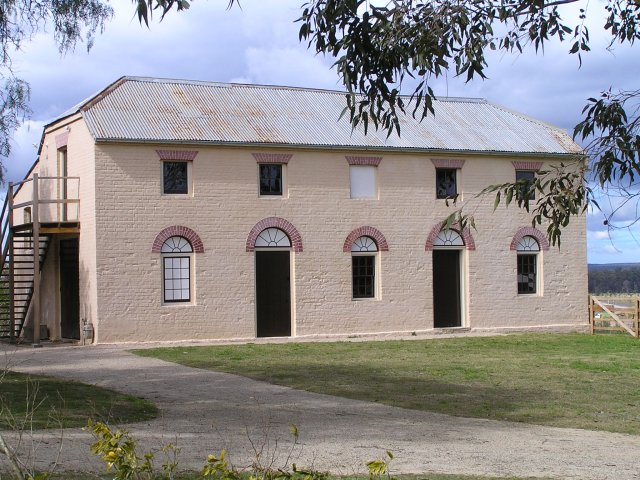
Two-storey building, possibly used as stables

At the rear of the house there is an imposing two-storey brick building that may have been used for stables, barn or even as another dwelling house. The symmetrically placed recesses and openings on the ground floor with their semi-circular arches suggest that this building was erected at a later date than the house, possibly in the 1820s or 1830s.

Remnant Farm

Originally a 600 acre grant to Charles Throsby in 1809. Part of 1500 acres granted to Throsby in the Minto area. Macquarie passed through the farm on his 1810 tour of inspection, implying that farm buildings were likely to have been built around that time.

In 1859 the farm of 1000 acres was leased as a working dairy farm with a mile of river frontage to the George's River, including large areas of rye, field peas, corn and sugarcane as well as 200 fruit trees and vegetable gardens. An underground dairy produced quality butter. Outbuildings included piggeries, cow yards, two large farm sheds, four new farm huts and a substantial brick four-stall stable and coach house with a granary above.

Early 20th century, it was subdivided and sold by Archer Broughton Throsby, although he was recorded as still residing at Glenfield Farm on his death in 1925. In 1920 James Freeland Leacock, who had married a descendant of the Broughton family of Appin, bought Glenfield for a dairy farm. Surviving elements such as old fenceposts remain on the estate.

=== Garden ===
The key elements of its garden are the 19th century Moreton Bay fig (Ficus macrophylla) and early 20th century pepper trees, the old water cistern and terracing of the northern garden area, including the tennis court. A clump of giant bamboo (Bambusa balcooa) defines one edge of the garden. Younger trees include bunya-bunya pine (Araucaria bidwillii) a pair of which flank the front door facing west.

Two bunya pines (Araucaria bidwillii) have been planted on axis with the western entrance door of the homestead. A clump of gian bamboo defines the edge of the gardene area of the farm. Silky oaks (Grevillea robusta), African olives (Olea africana), pepper trees / peppercorns (Schinus areira), and more recent eucalypts make up the dominant tree canopy around the homestead complex.

=== Landscape context ===
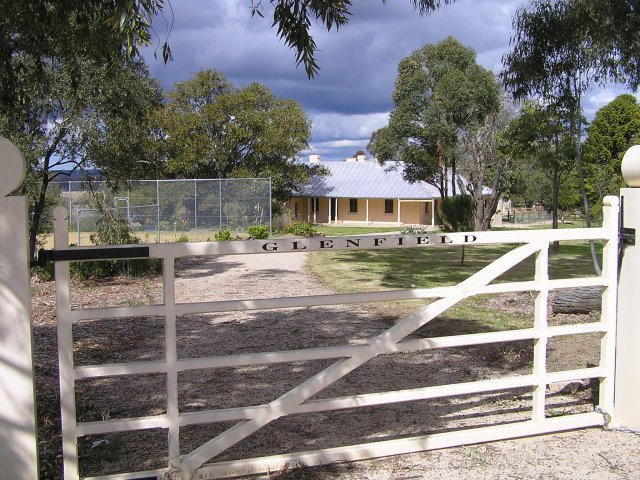
Entrance gate

The entrance gates to Glenfield Farm contrast with a hard suburban treatment to the road, of street trees, kerb and guttering, and standard road surface. These elements are intrusive on its setting.

Standard residential subdivision from 1988 surrounds Glenfield Farm on the south, west and north, to the edge of the escarpment. Its nature, and proximity, for example with houses abutting right up to the western edge of Leacock's Lane, is unfortunate, compromising the setting of Glenfield Farm, and obscuring its traditional views from each of the three entrance driveways/ paths looking west up to the remnant vegetated ridgeline beyond.

Only from the east is a more open aspect still evident, with a steep slope to Glenfield Creek, the southern railway line, George's River and a large area of landfill to the south-east. Two residences, one a modern brick construction, have been built adjoining Glenfield Farm east of Leacock's Lane. The curtilage of Glenfield Farm wraps around these lots.

=== Modifications and dates ===
- 600 acre grant to Charles Throsby in 1809. Part of 1500 acres granted to Throsby in the Minto area.
- Macquarie passed through the farm on his 1810 tour of inspection, implying that farm buildings were likely to have been built around that time.
- Glenfield Farmhouse built between 1810 and 1817.
- 1820s: southern additions at end of verandah.
- 1859: the farm of 1000 acres was leased as a working dairy farm with a mile of river frontage to the George's River, including large areas of rye, field peas, corn and sugarcane as well as 200 fruit trees and vegetable gardens. An underground dairy produced quality butter. Outbuildings included piggeries, cow yards, two large farm sheds, four new farm huts and a substantial brick four stall stable and coach house with a granary above.
- Early 20th century, subdivided and sold by Archer Broughton Throsby, although he was recorded as still residing at Glenfield Farm on his death in 1925.
- 1920: James Freeland Leacock, who had married a descendant of the Broughton family of Appin, bought Glenfield for a dairy farm.
- Remnant farm of approximately 14 acres in 1974. The residents continued farming activities.
- 1977: student report by Mark Bullen & Ian McGilvray indicated that the vegetation associated with the estate was mostly confined to the ridge with cleared land used for grazing and market gardening to the east.
- c. 1983: roof cladding and plumbing replacement and reconstruction of dormer windows by Cox Tanner P/L Architects
- 1984 Leacock's Lane was still unsealed when "The Glenfield Story" was published. The remaining estate was incorporated into a residential subdivision, with Leacock's Lane as its main circulation ring road (off the Hume Highway).
- c. 1987: introduction of sub ground level concrete barrier to discourage Moreton Bay fig tree roots from destabilising foundations.
- 1988 (spring): Glenfield rewired by J & M Norris Electrical Contractors.
- 1988: The Glen Regent estate was begun (residential subdivision which now surrounds the place to west, south and north).
- c. 1990: replacement of ceiling in rooms 8 & 9. Concrete render applied to external brickwork at room 14, west wall. Repointing of brickwork at west elevation (predominantly under the sills). Former bathroom at the northwest corner has been demolished, and a new verandah column installed.
- 1991: 2 progress reports on termite damage control and remediation works to ceilings, external painting, repointing, rendering, brickwork replacement and repointing on west wall of room 14, kitchen.
- 1996: A draft Plan of Management for Leacock Regional Park (to the east) was commissioned.
- 2003: property purchased by Department of Planning. Warwick Mayne-Wilson prepared a conservation management plan.
- 2006 property with reduced curtilage (1.173 ha) transferred to NSW Historic Houses Trust. The remainder of curtilage (5.518ha) transferred to the NSW National Parks & Wildlife Service for incorporation into the adjoining Leacock Regional Park.
- 2008: AIA (Heritage) Architecture Award given for the restoration of Glenfield for the Historic Houses Trust, NSW: Clive Lucas, Stapleton & Partners, This is the first house to be saved through the Historic Houses Trust of NSW Endangered Houses Fund. "Glenfield" is the most intact house of the Macquarie period, 1810-1821. Not only does the house survive but so do its principal outbuildings: privy, dairy/bakehouse and stables/coach house. Inside, the house retains virtually all its cedar fittings: doors, windows, reveal shutters and fireplace surrounds. It is, as the heritage architect says, "a bungalow, a little country house built for a gentleman".
- 2006-8: 21,000 litre plastic water tank inserted into original brick lined underground well (c.1817) rear (south) of main house. An existing concrete water tank was relocated to collect rainwater from the stables block roof. Throughout the garden, tapes were fitted for both mains and tank water supply, with an electric pump fitted to the tank for extra pressure to accommodate mobile sprinklers.
- 2011 - marketed by Christies - did not sell
- 2012 - on real estate market again
- 2013 - purchased by cardiologist Prof. John French and writer Jennifer French

== Heritage listing ==
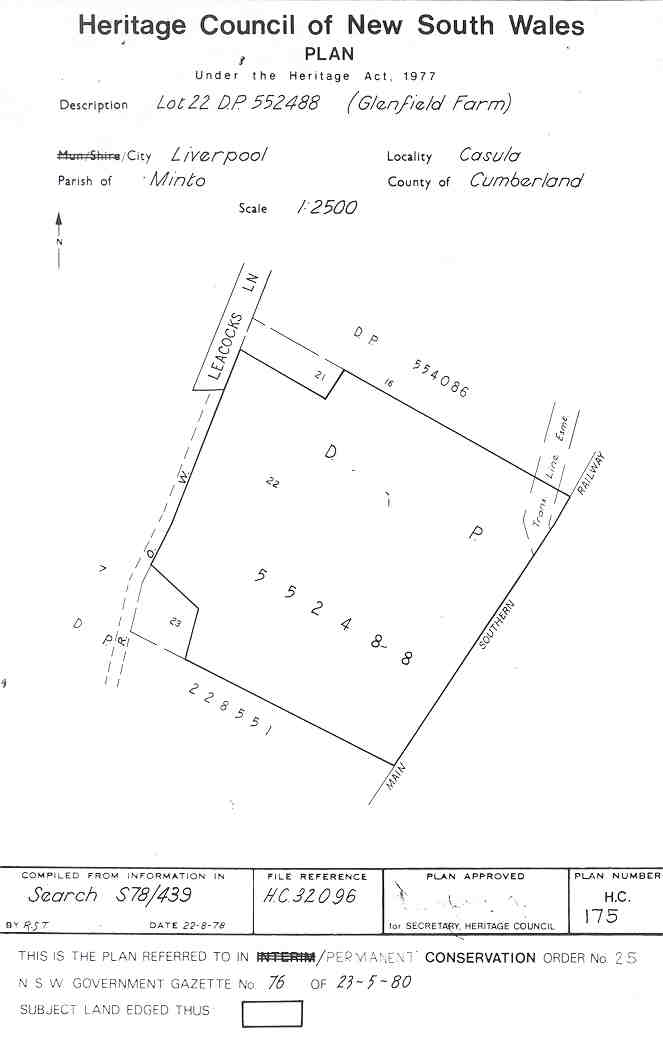
Heritage boundaries

Glenfield Farm homestead and its outbuildings are of exceptional historical significance as one of the few surviving rural farm complexes in New South Wales dating from the original land grant of 1810 and still capable of use for family living and limited farming activities.

It is associated in the 19th century with Charles Throsby, an eminent colonial officer and explorer of his time (1802-1828) and in the 20th century with James Leacock, an innovative dairy farmer, entrepreneur and idealist.

Its buildings provide valuable evidence of the architectural style and nature of construction of rural buildings during the early days of European settlement, as well as the lifestyle of those who occupied it. The homestead is one of very few buildings in the State that has been continuously occupied as a private residence. The survival of all buildings relatively intact is remarkable, and is valued by the community.

According to heritage assessment the surviving ground of Glenfield Farm demonstrate agricultural activities and the changing functional requirements of its occupants.

Glenfield Farm compares well with its colonial farm peers, in terms of having:

1. an original, very early farmhouse (1810-1817) still intact and used as a family residence;
2. virtually all its outbuildings, intact and substantial;
3. been associated with two very prominent men and their descendants throughout its long history;
4. retained, without significant alteration, its geometric Georgian style architecture;
5. a modest capability for animal agistment or horticulture (on the footslopes and flats);
6. a modest degree of visual prominence from the east (and railway line).

Glenfield is associated with Charles Throsby, his nephew Charles Throsby and his family. This farm is the oldest continuously worked farm in Australia, and its buildings rank among the earliest buildings in the country for their design and workmanship.

An intact early building group with elements of its garden and part of its original farm estate intact, with more of the broader estate area still discernable beyond.

The homestead and garden complex can still be appreciated to some extent in their original relationship with the escarpment and Glenfield Creek valley, as can some of their traditional view prospects.

There are components of the place that have individual significances such as the various buildings, the remnant garden, archaeological resources and layout.

The place has strong associations with various notable individuals including the Throsby family and James Leacock.

The place retains its traditional prominence along the ridge from the east, as a local landmark.

The place is of considerable scientific interest on account of its archaeological research potential.

It has considerable potential to demonstrate the development of the estate from the 1800s to the present.

Glenfield Farm was listed on the New South Wales State Heritage Register on 2 April 1999.
