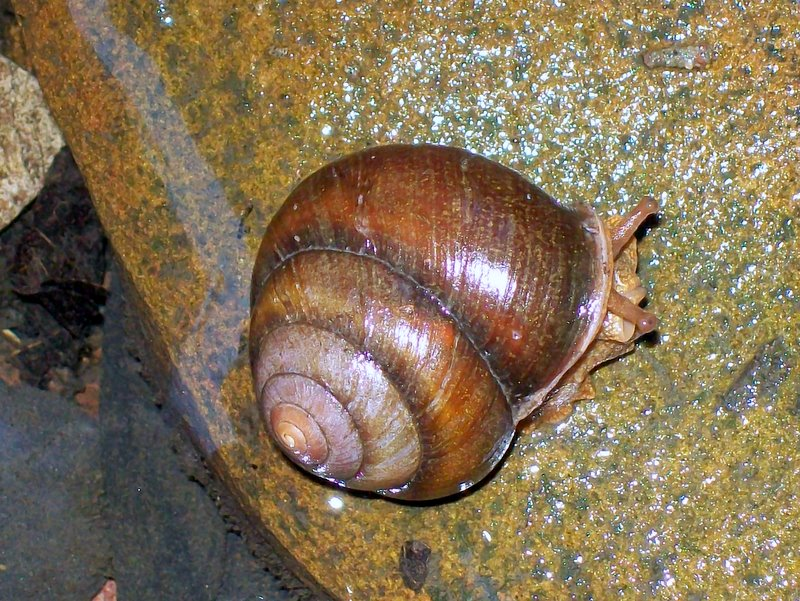
- Meridolum spp. at Garawarra State Conservation Area, Australia

Scientific classification
- Kingdom: Animalia
- Phylum: Mollusca
- Class: Gastropoda
- Order: Stylommatophora
- Family: Camaenidae
- Genus: Meridolum; Iredale, 1933

= Meridolum =

Genus of gastropods

Meridolum is a genus of air-breathing land snails, terrestrial pulmonate gastropod mollusks in the family Camaenidae.

== Species ==
Species within the genus Meridolum include:

- Meridolum benneti Brazier, 1872
- Meridolum corneovirens (Pfeiffer, 1851)
- Meridolum depressum Hedley, 1901
- Meridolum gulosum Gould, 1846
- Meridolum marshalli McLauchlan, 1951
- Meridolum middenense McLauchlan, 1954
