= Leacock Regional Park =

- Coordinates: 33°57′22″S 150°54′30″E

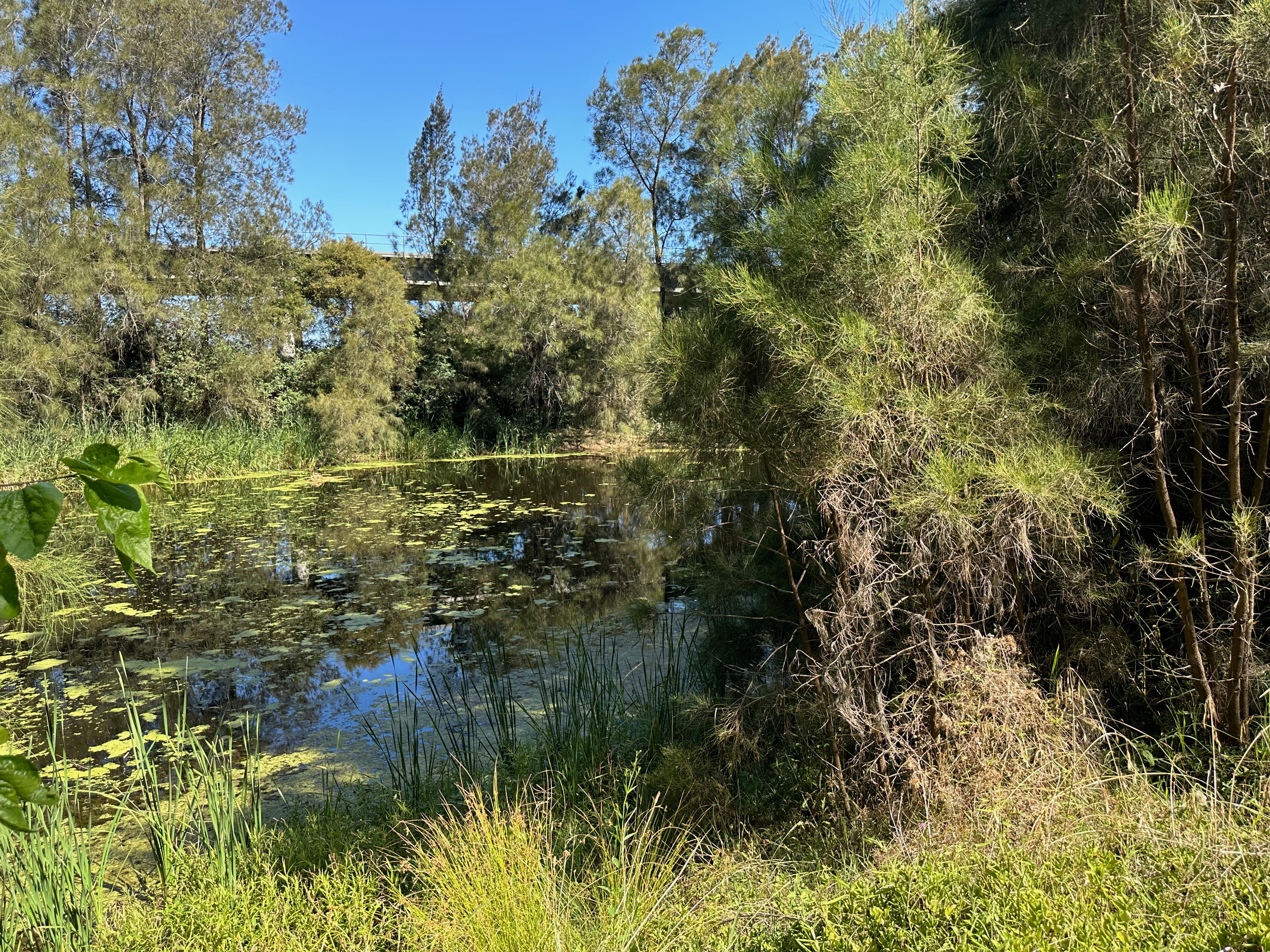
Bellbird Walking Track in Leacock Regional Park

Leacock Regional Park, located in Casula, approx. 40 km south-west of Sydney, is a patch of open green space which provides views of Holsworthy bushland from the ridge line.

The Park is a dog-friendly park, and has many walking tracks along the Georges River, which link it with other facilities such as the Casula Powerhouse Arts Centre.
