= Meridolum benneti =

Conservation status
- Vulnerable (IUCN 2.3)

Scientific classification
- Kingdom: Animalia
- Phylum: Mollusca
- Class: Gastropoda
- Order: Stylommatophora
- Family: Camaenidae
- Genus: Meridolum
- Species: M. benneti

Binomial name
- Meridolum benneti Brazier, 1872

Species of gastropod

Meridolum benneti is a species of air-breathing land snails, terrestrial pulmonate gastropod mollusks in the family Camaenidae. This species is endemic to Australia.
