= Bob Ingham =

Australian businessman (1931–2020)

Bob Ingham AO
- Born: Robert Walter Ingham; 30 September 1931; Casula, New South Wales
- Died: 22 September 2020 (aged 88); Casula, New South Wales
- Occupations: Poultry breeder and processor; Racehorse owner and breeder; Property developer; Philanthropist
- Known for: Inghams
- Relatives: Jack Ingham (brother)

Robert Walter Ingham AO (30 September 1931 – 22 September 2020) was a leading Australian businessman in the poultry industry and was co-founder of the largest thoroughbred horse racing and breeding operation in Australia. He was a noted philanthropist and funded the creation of the Ingham Institute for Applied Medical Research. In 2007 Australia Post honoured Ingham with a postage stamp.

== Biography ==
Ingham was born in the Sydney suburb of Casula, New South Wales, the son of farmer Walter Ingham, he was known as "Bob" from an early age. On his father's death in 1953, Bob Ingham and his older brother, Jack, took over Inghams, a small family-run poultry breeding business founded in 1918. The brothers built the company into the largest producer of chickens and turkeys in Australia. Headquartered in Casula, the operation was sold in 2014 for A$880 million.

According to the 2019 Financial Review Rich List, Ingham's net worth was assessed at A$1.17 billion.

== Thoroughbred horse racing ==
Ingham's father had had an interest in breeding horses and, in addition to the poultry business, the brothers also inherited a broodmare named Valiant Rose. The mare was a descendant of the great British racehorse Bend Or, an Epsom Derby winner and Champion broodmare sire. The Ingham brothers used Valiant Rose to begin building what became a A$250 million breeding and racing operation, the largest in Australia. Their equine empire included Woodlands Stud at Denman in the Hunter Valley, Crown Lodge racing stables at Warwick Farm Racecourse, Sydney and Carbine Lodge racing stables at Flemington Racecourse, Melbourne, plus racing stables in Adelaide and Brisbane. The most famous of the Inghams' successful horses was Octagonal, the 1996 Australian Horse of the Year and a winner of multiple Group One races including the Cox Plate and the Australian Derby. Ingham sold the Woodland Stud operation to Dubai's ruler, Sheik Mohammed bin Rashid al-Maktoum, for $500 million in 2008.

== Family ==
Ingham and his wife Norma had four children. His daughters are Lyn and Debbie and his sons are Robby and John. Debbie Kepitis (née Ingham) is one of the owners of the 2015 Horse of the Year Winx. The other children also own horses under the Ingham Racing syndicate. They have also been interested in fashion apparel. Lyn and Debbie had a fashion boutique in Eastwood. Robby and his eponymous stores were in the city of Sydney and principally the suburb of Paddington. All the Ingham children are now involved as property developers in New South Wales given the vast property holdings left to them by their father and uncle Jack Ingham. Robby Ingham is the chair of the board of Ingham Property. Whilst often described as a fashion icon in the Sydney press Robby Ingham is now known more for his niche commercial and residential development, The Cambrian, in Oxford Street Padington.

== Honours ==
In January 2001, Ingham was awarded the Centenary Medal "for service to the Liverpool community". In January 2003, he was appointed an Officer of the Order of Australia for service to the poultry industry as a pioneer in research and development and establishment of world best practice standards, and to the community through support for a broad range of charitable organisations and health care facilities. In 2004 Ingham was inducted into the Australian Racing Hall of Fame.
