= Casula Mall =

Shopping mall in New South Wales, Australia

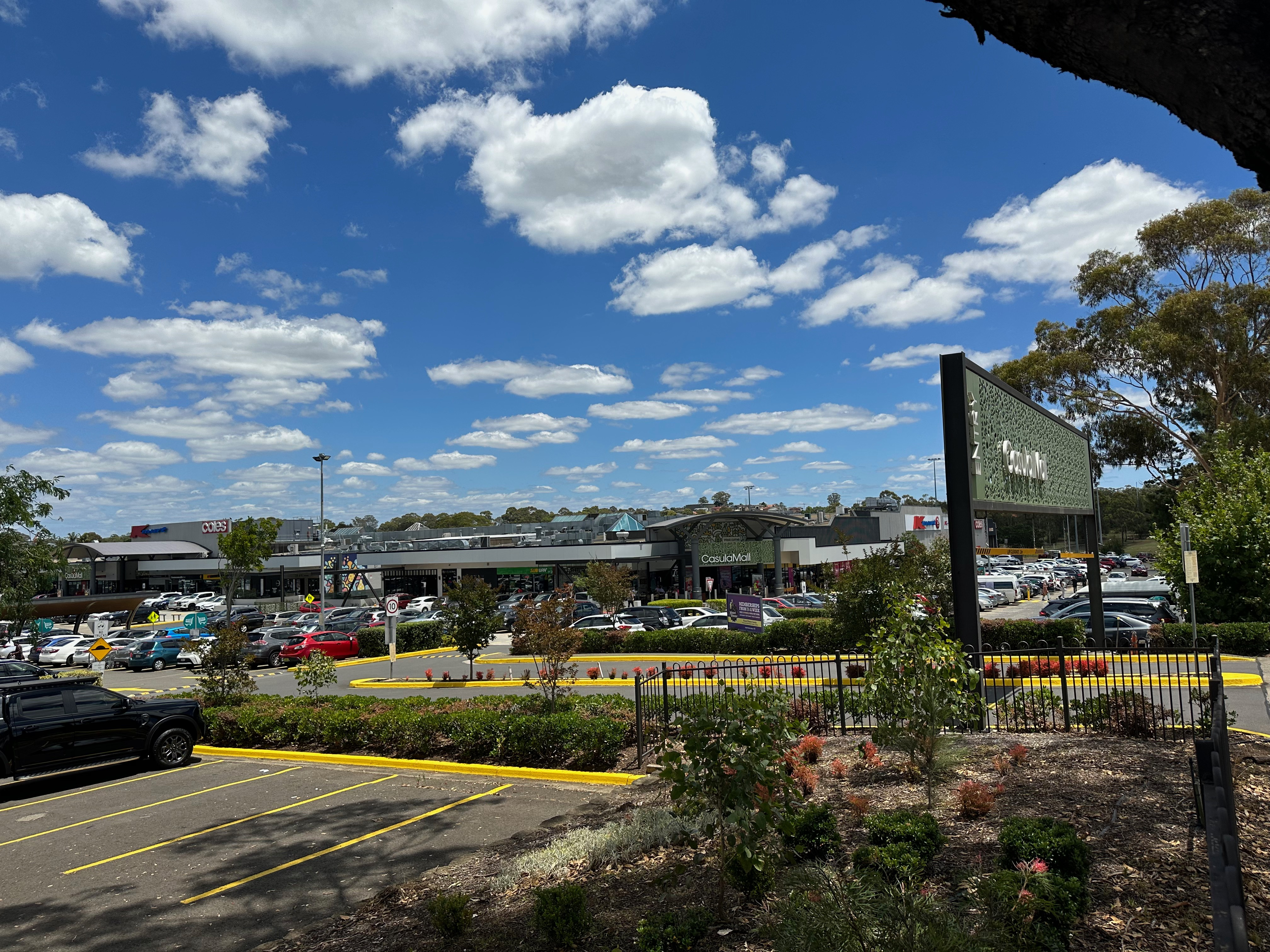
- Location: Casula
- Coordinates: 33°56′53″S 150°53′59″E
- Opened: 1986; 40 years ago
- Manager: AMP Capital Shopping Centres
- Owner: AMP Capital
- Num. of stores: 53
- Num. of anchor tenants: 3
- Floor area: 20,057 m^{2} (215,890 sq ft)
- Floors: 1
- Parking: 814
- Website: www.casulamall.com.au

Casula Mall is a sub-regional shopping centre located in the suburb of Casula, a suburb of Sydney. Its main anchor tenants are Aldi, Coles and a 24hr Kmart and it has over 55 speciality stores.

== History ==
Casula Mall opened in 1986 and featured a Super Kmart hypermarket and a Franklins supermarket. In 1989 Coles Myer abolished the Super Kmart hypermarket store format in Australia and Super Kmart Casula was divided into a regular Kmart discount department store and a Coles New World supermarket. Casula Mall underwent redevelopment in 1998 and 2007 and now comprises more than 55 stores and 3 anchor tenants. Franklins closed in 2011 and was replaced by Supa IGA. IGA closed its store in 2015 and was replaced by Aldi which opened in late 2016.

== Shopping / Facilities ==
Major retailers of Casula Mall include one of the first 24hr trading Kmart, Coles and Aldi.
