= Casula =

- Suburb
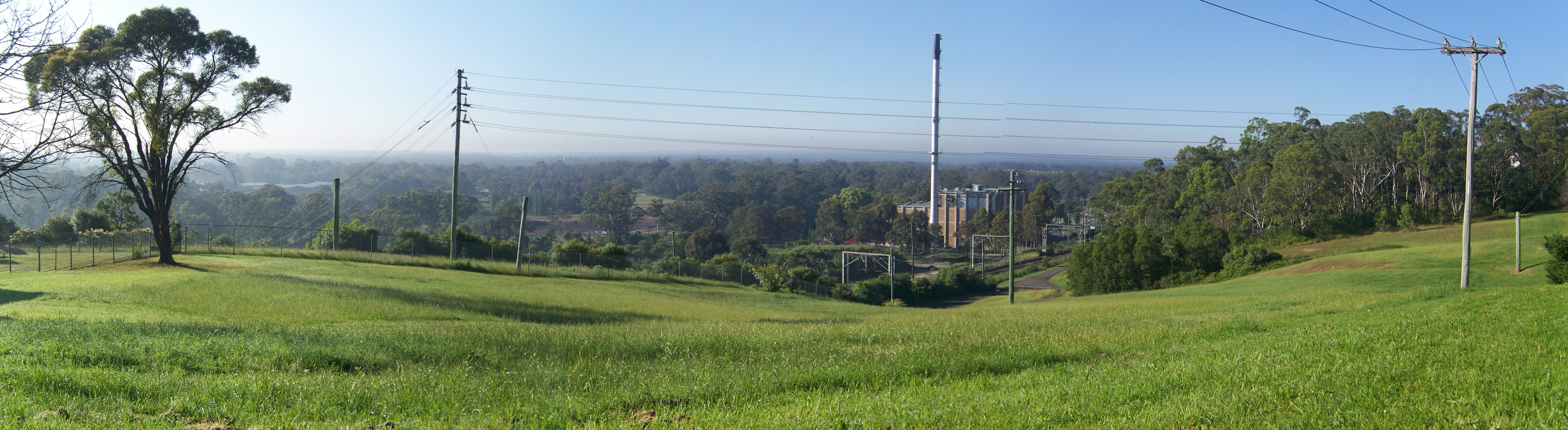
- View of the Casula Powerhouse and Casula railway station from Jamison Park, Buckland Road

- Interactive map of Casula
- Country: Australia
- State: New South Wales
- City: Sydney
- LGA: City of Liverpool
- Location: 34 km (21 mi) south-west of Sydney

Government
  - State electorate: Macquarie Fields, Holsworthy
  - Federal division: Werriwa
- Elevation: 48 m (157 ft)

Population
  - Total: 16,584 (2021 census)
- Postcode: 2170
Suburbs around Casula
Lurnea	Liverpool	Moorebank
Prestons	Casula	Moorebank
Glenfield	Glenfield	Holsworthy

Casula (/kəˈsjuːlə/) is a suburb of Sydney, in the state of New South Wales, Australia. It is 34 kilometres south-west of the Sydney central business district, in the local government area of the City of Liverpool.

Casula is the first suburb immediately south of Liverpool on the Hume Highway and the Main Southern railway line between Sydney and Melbourne. Casula consists of undulating, gently rolling land, with elevations across the suburb being mostly between 30 and 70 metres above sea level. The Georges River forms the eastern boundary of the suburb, and its western bank is paralleled by a relatively steep escarpment.

== History ==
=== Aboriginal ===
The original inhabitants of the Casula area were the Tharawal or "Dharawal" people of the greater Eora nation, an Aboriginal Australian group. "Tharawal" refers to the country and people who belong to greater southern and south-western Sydney. The Tharawal Local Aboriginal Land Council (LALC) extends through Liverpool, Camden, Campbelltown and Wollondilly Local Government Areas (LGAs). The totem animal for Tharawal country is the superb lyrebird (Menura novaehollandiae).

=== European ===
Casula was first settled by agriculturalists in the nineteenth century, among them Richard Guise, who named his farm "Casula". The area became dominated by poultry farming, market gardening and fruit growing. Another notable farm was Glenfield Farm, which dates from circa 1817. Situated in Leacocks Lane, it originally belonged to politician Charles Throsby, a member of the Legislative Council and an explorer. The farm is the oldest continuously worked farm in Australia and is listed on the Register of the National Estate.

During World War I, a large Australian Imperial Forces recruitment and training reserve was located in Casula – a fact reflected by the name of one of its major residential streets, "Reserve Road". This camp became briefly notorious in 1916 when a large mob of soldiers rebelled against the strict training regimen, marched on nearby Liverpool, ransacked and looted several pubs, hijacked several trains to Central station in Sydney and continued their drunken rioting, resulting in the Military Police shooting dead one rioter.

In 1918, Walter Ingham Sr. bought 42 acres (170,000 m^{2}) of bush land in Casula as a gift to 18-year-old son, Walter. On his death in 1953, his sons Jack and Bob took over the small chicken breeding operation and built it into the largest producer of chickens and turkeys in Australia. Inghams is now headquartered in Liverpool.

Casula Post Office opened on 1 February 1924 and closed in 1979. A Liverpool South office was renamed Cross Roads in 1964 and Casula Mall in 1990 and remains open.

Being heavily farmed, the area did not become suburbanised until the late 1950s. Much of the acreage in the central and southern portions was subdivided and developed over the next few decades but even now there are pockets of undeveloped land.

== Heritage listings ==
Casula has a number of heritage-listed sites, including:

- 88 Leacocks Lane: Glenfield Farm

== Environment ==
The ecological community that once covered vast areas (125,000 Ha) of South-western Sydney, including Casula is known as the Cumberland Plain Woodland.

=== Leacock Regional Park ===
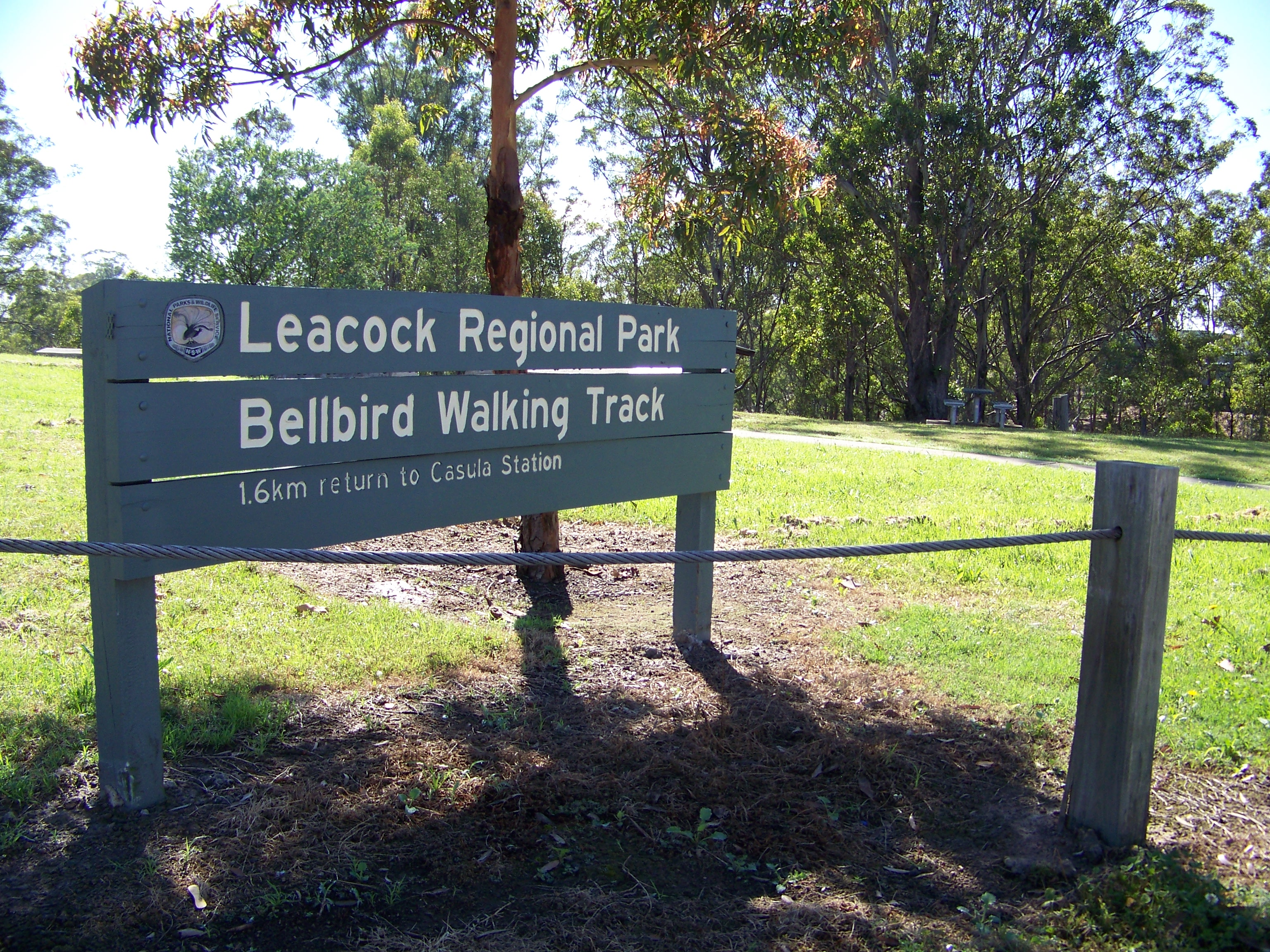
Leacock Regional Park

The National Parks & Wildlife Service Leacock Regional park is home to one of the last remaining stands of Cumberland Plain Woodland. It is also home to the critically endangered Cumberland Plain Land Snail (Meridolum corneovirens). The ridge line at the top of the park offers views to the Holsworthy bush land. The bellbird walking track takes you through the remnant stand of Cumberland Plain Woodland and can be linked to a track along the Georges River where a lookout can be found by the Casula Powerhouse Arts Centre. The 'Weaving Garden' bush regeneration group are currently bush regenerating within the reserve.

== Landmarks ==
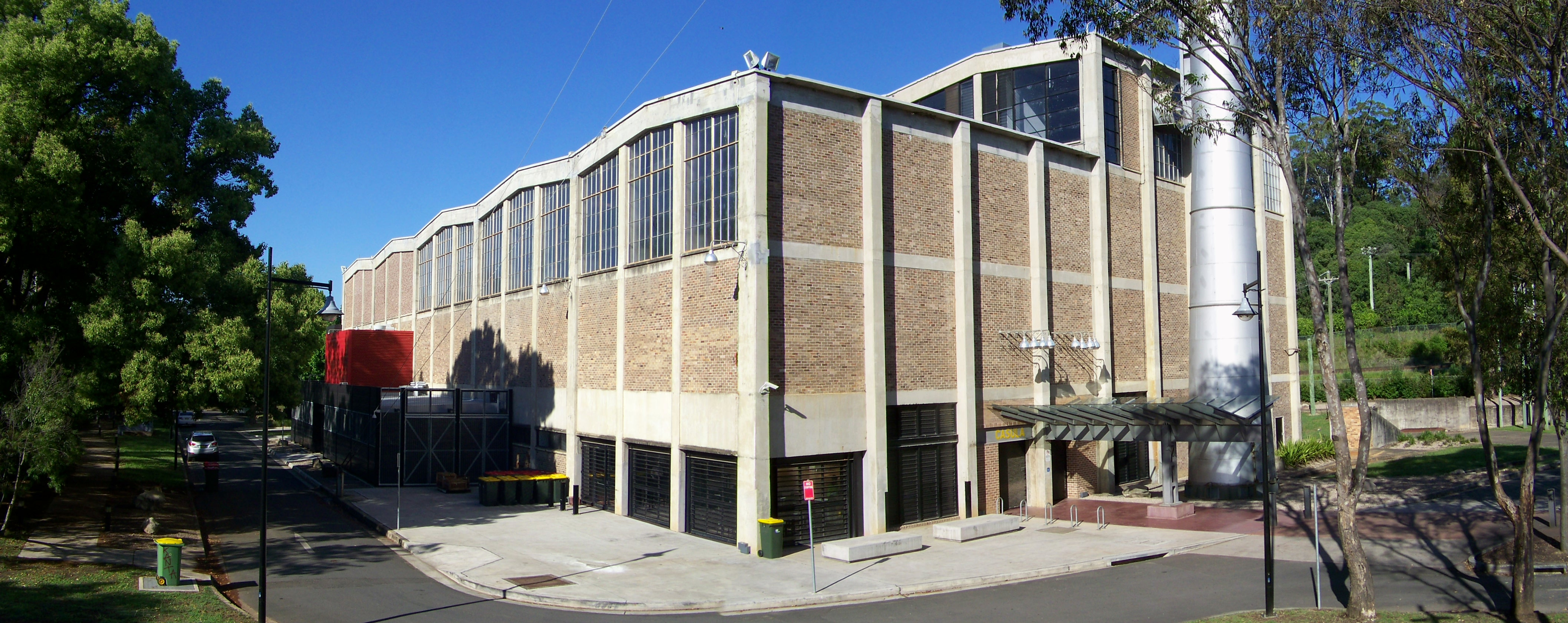
Casula Powerhouse Arts Centre

The Casula Powerhouse Arts Centre (CPAC), which is situated next to Casula railway station, was a former 1950s power station. After falling into disrepair, the building was refurbished and reopened in 1994 as an arts centre. As well as hosting a wide variety of exhibitions and arts events reflecting its multicultural community, CPAC has been host to the Blake Prize, an art prize focused on spirituality, since 2016.

== Commercial area ==
Casula Mall is a shopping centre owned by AMP Capital and opened in 1986. It consists of a Kmart discount department store, a Coles supermarket and approximately forty specialty shops. Crossroads Homemaker Centre is another shopping centre in Casula also owned by AMP Capital. It is situated at the southern end of Casula, containing Bunnings Warehouse hardware and Costco, numerous bedding and furniture stores, electrical stores such as Bing Lee and The Good Guys.

== Transport ==
Casula is bordered on the north and west by the M5 Motorway, with continuous freeway-standard highway to central Sydney and the North Shore. The Hume Highway cuts through the centre of Casula.

Casula railway station is on the Main Southern railway line, but it is located far from the commercial area. Transit Systems bus services link Casula to the major commercial and retail centre of Liverpool and Liverpool station.

Glenfield station also serves Casula, being the station of choice for many Casula commuters due to easier accessibility as well as a significantly faster service into Sydney. Buses link Casula and Glenfield travelling via the Hume Highway.

== Schools ==
Casula Primary School was opened on De Meyrick Avenue in 1959, and Casula High School opened in 1973. All Saints Catholic Senior College is the only Catholic school in the suburb being opened in 1987.

== Housing ==
Casula is notable for its variable demographics and mixture of socio-economic levels existing side by side. The central and southern areas consist mainly of privately owned houses including the locally famous ranch-style mansion on Old Kurrajong Road owned by Bob Ingham.

== Population ==
According to the 2021 census, Casula had a population of 16,584, which was substantially families. Of occupied private dwellings in Casula, 71.1% were separate houses, 24.7% were semi-detached, row or terrace houses, townhouses etc., 4.1% were flats or apartments and 0.0% were other dwellings.

In Casula, 50.8% of people were born in Australia. The most common other countries of birth were Iraq 5.1%, Fiji 3.2%, Lebanon 3.1%, Vietnam 2.6% and India 2.4%. 38.0% of people only spoke English at home. Other languages spoken at home included Arabic 17.6%, Vietnamese 3.7%, Hindi 3.4%, Greek 2.4% and Italian 2.0%. The most common responses for religion in Casula were Catholic 23.7%, Islam 20.4%, No Religion, so described 11.6%, Eastern Orthodox 7.6% and Not stated 6.7%. In Casula, Christianity was the largest religious group reported overall (51.4%) (this figure excludes not stated responses).

== Gallery ==
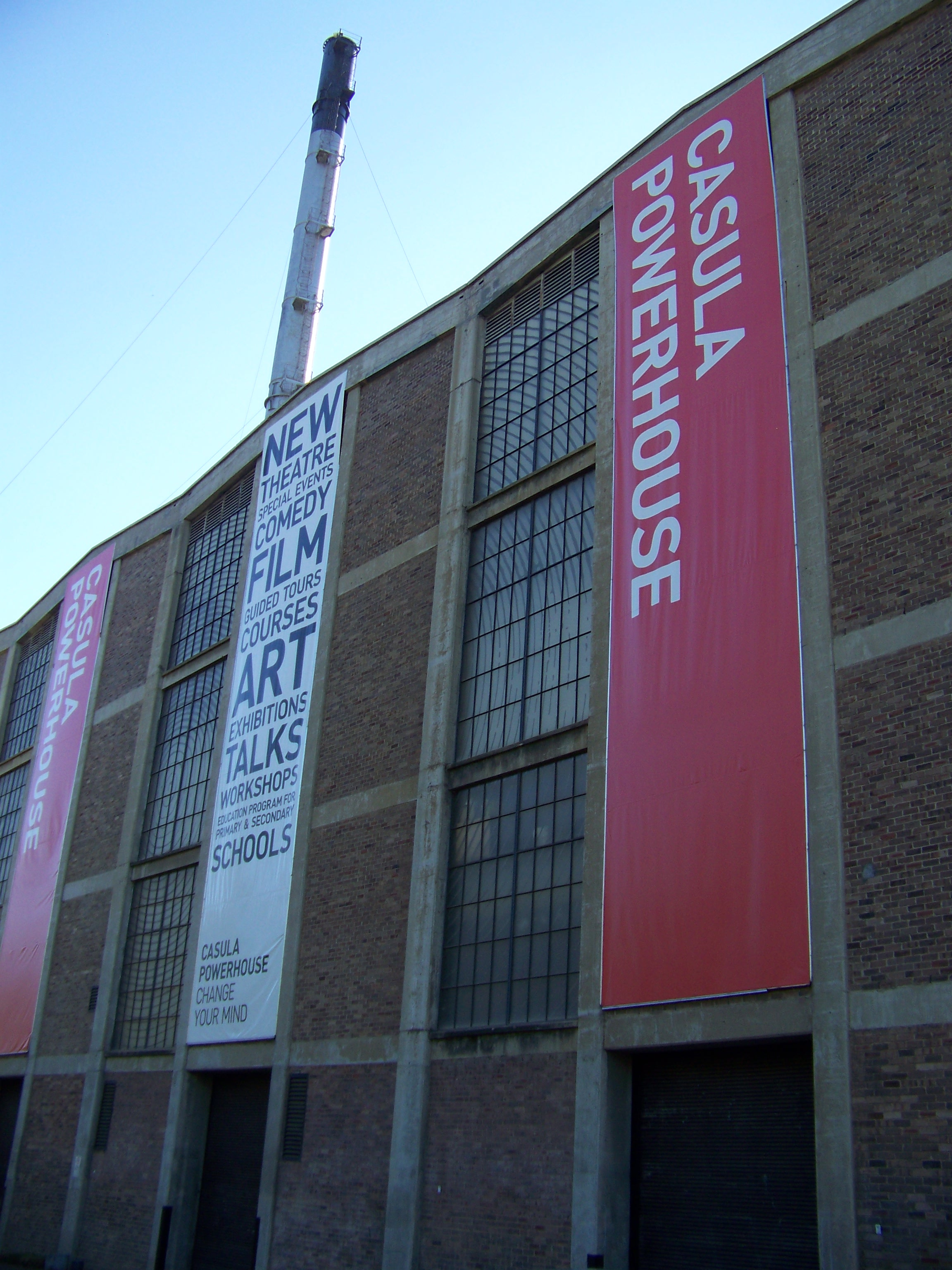
Casula Powerhouse Arts Centre

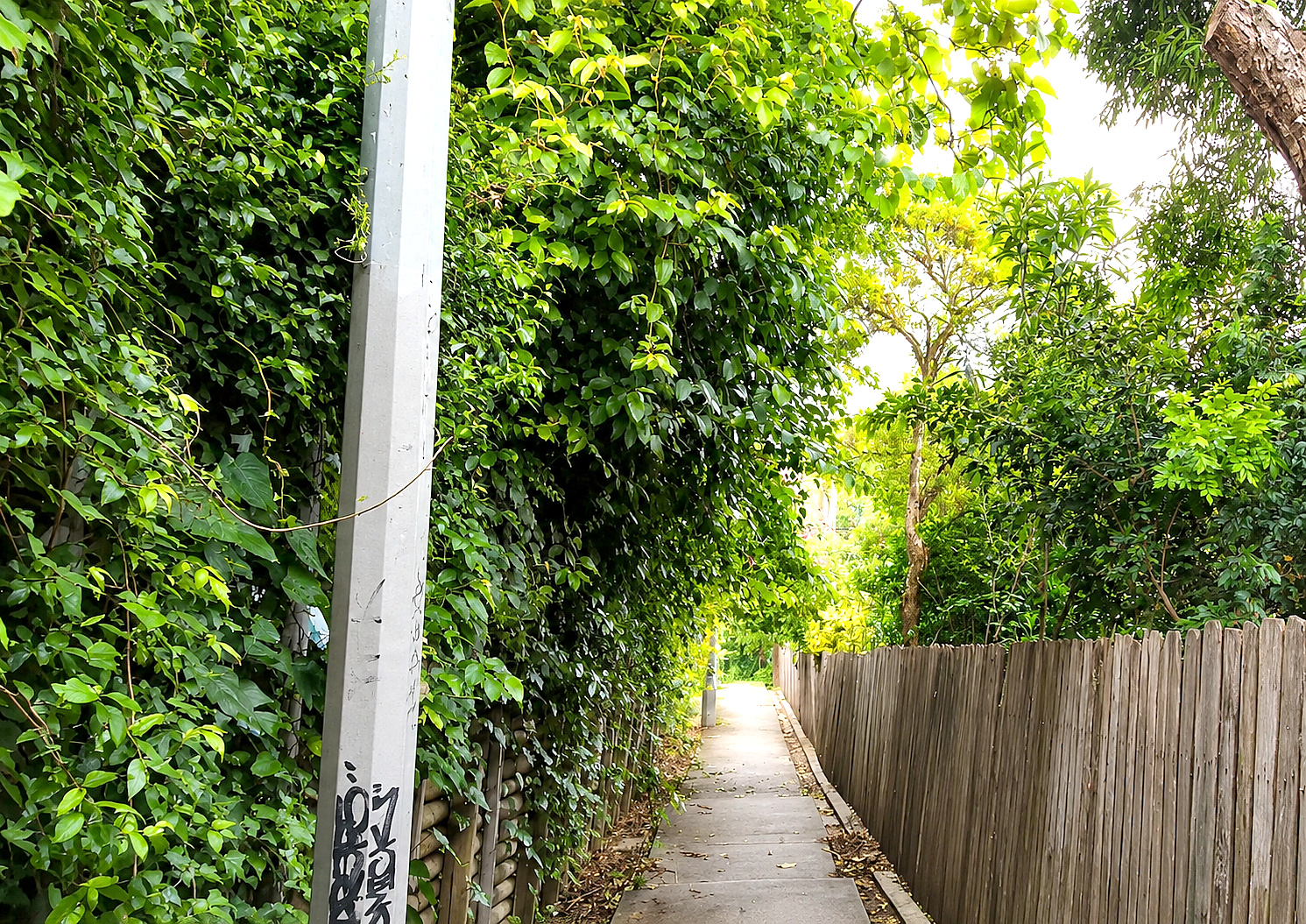
Canberra Pathway

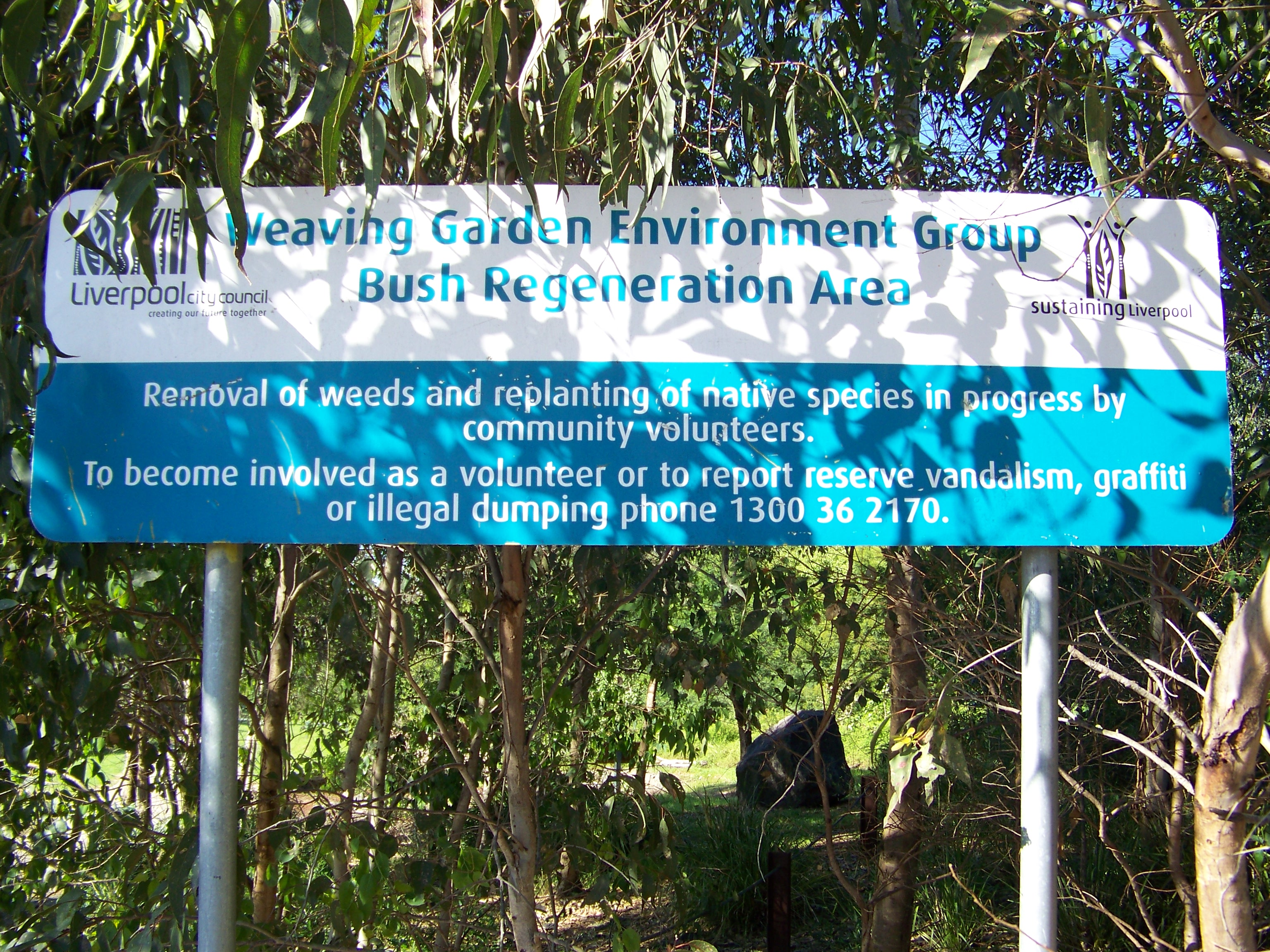
'Weaving Gardens' Bush Regeneration Area

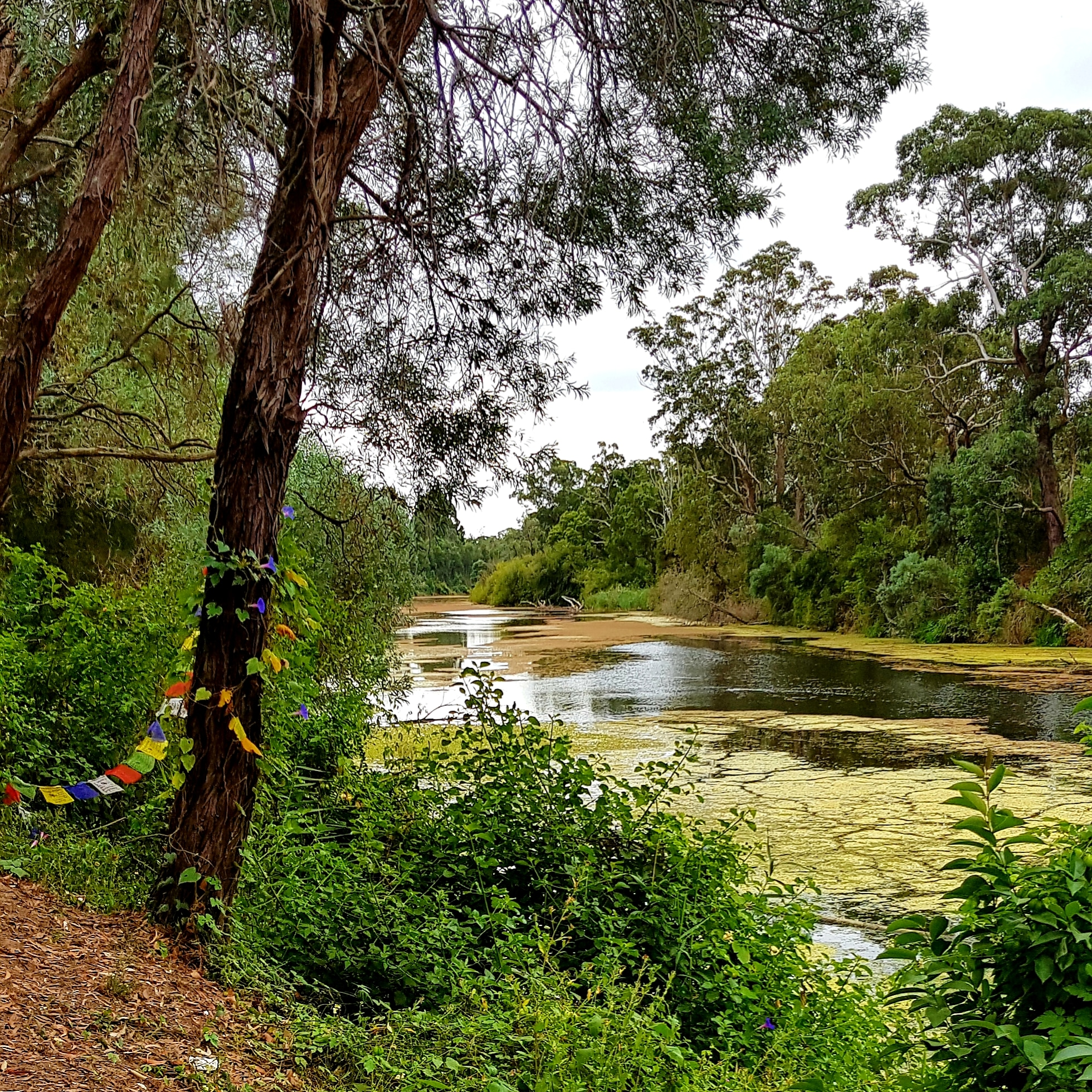
Georges River at Casula

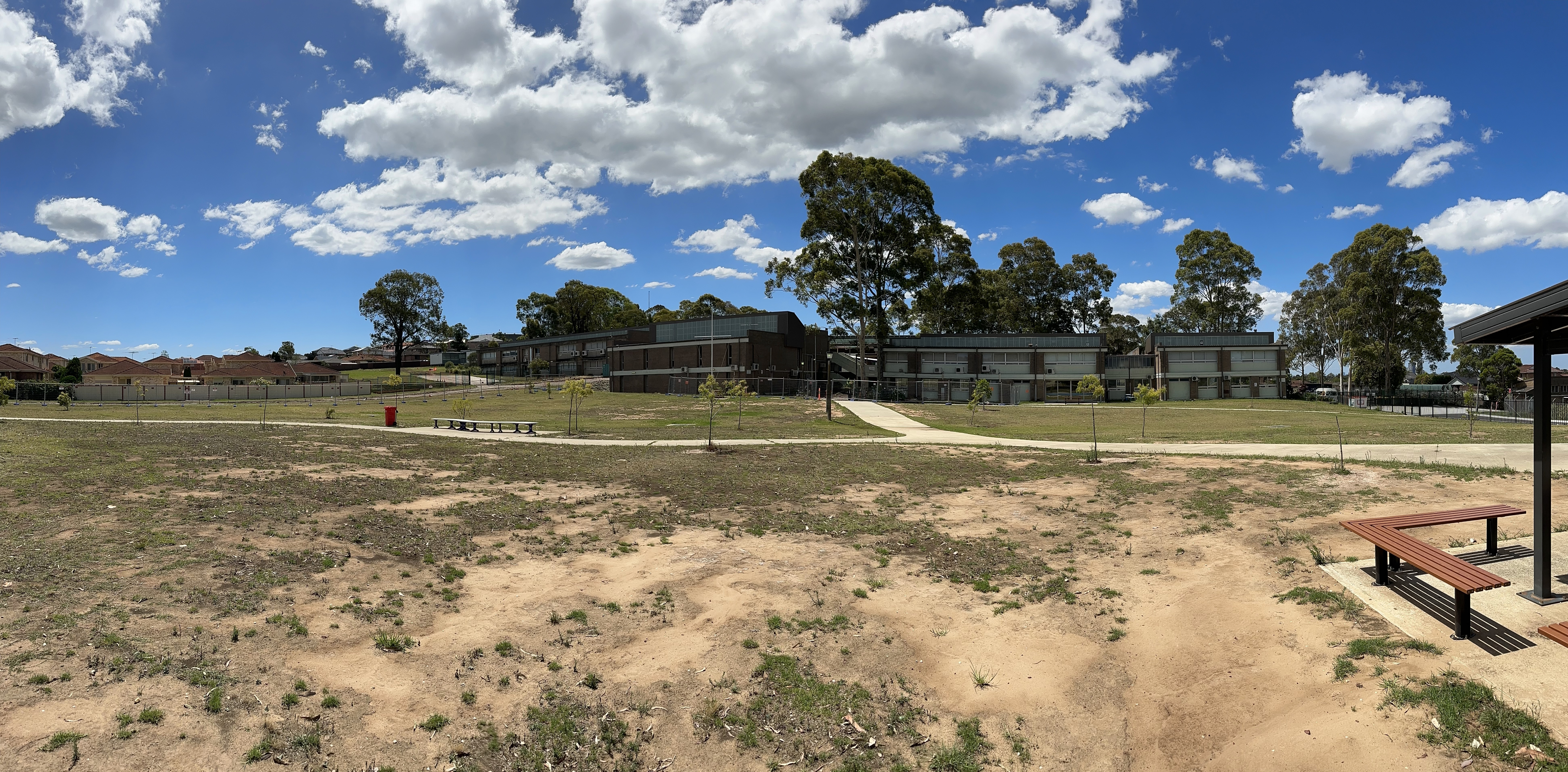
Casula High School

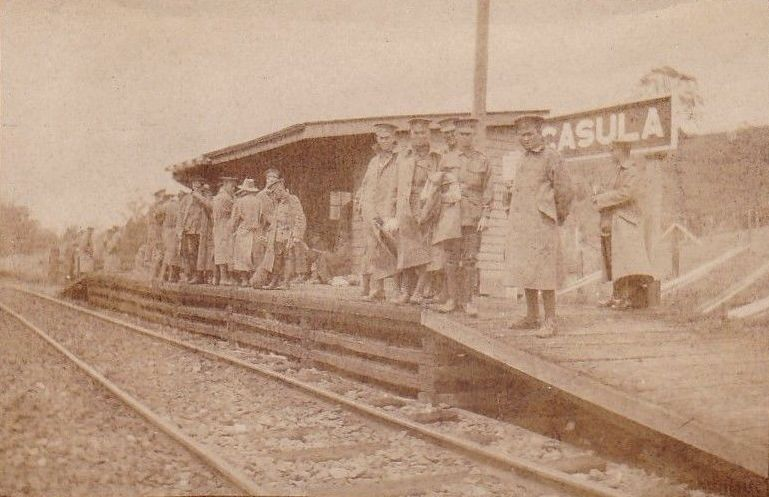
Casula Railway Station with recruited Australian soldiers waiting for the train in 1914
