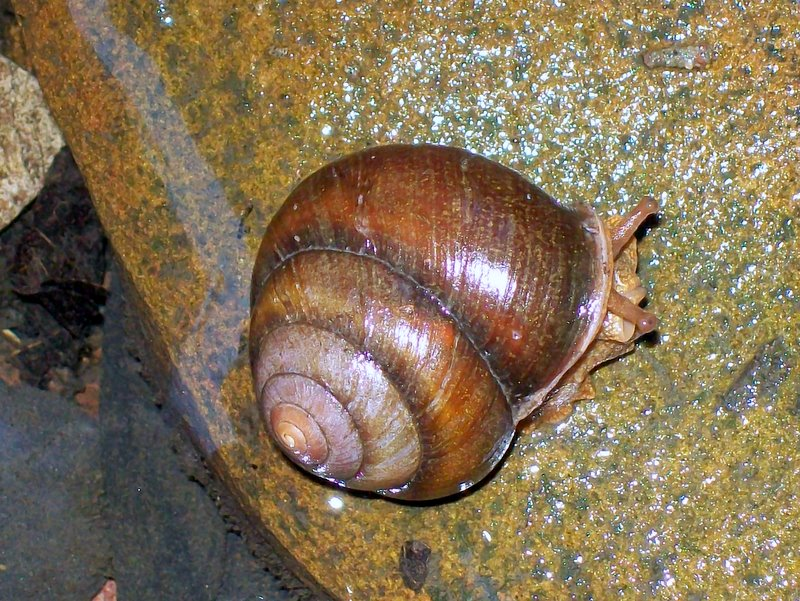
- An individual of Meridolum marshalli on a stone at the edge of Camp Gully Creek, which flows into the Hacking River in Royal National Park, south of Sydney, Australia

Conservation status
- Near Threatened (IUCN 2.3)

Scientific classification
- Kingdom: Animalia
- Phylum: Mollusca
- Class: Gastropoda
- Order: Stylommatophora
- Family: Camaenidae
- Genus: Meridolum
- Species: M. marshalli

Binomial name
- Meridolum marshalli McLauchlan, 1951

= Meridolum marshalli =

Species of gastropod

Meridolum marshalli is a species of air-breathing land snail, a terrestrial pulmonate gastropod mollusc in the family Camaenidae. This species is endemic to Australia.

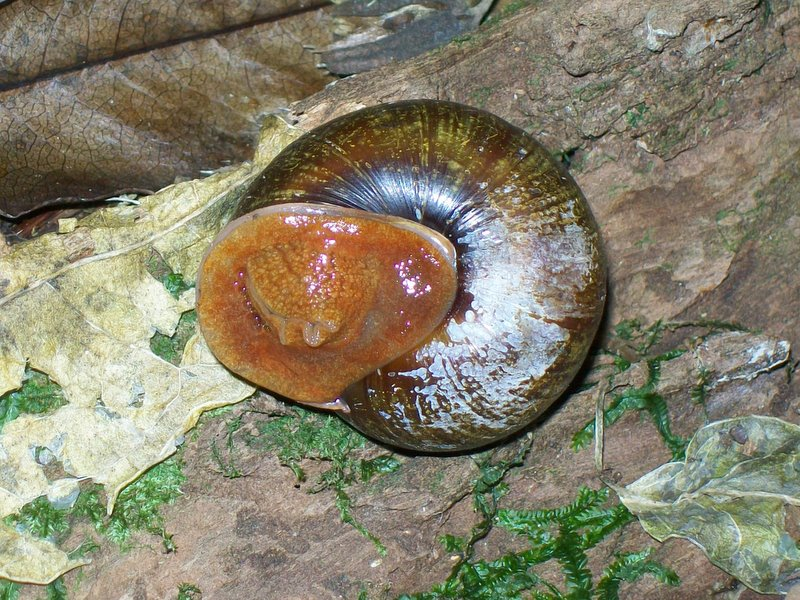
The underside of the same individual, with the soft parts mostly retracted

== Distribution and ecology ==
This species of land snail is restricted to the Royal National Park in New South Wales. The snail's main habitat is wet areas near the Hacking River. This snail eats soft green vegetation, rotting berries and humus.

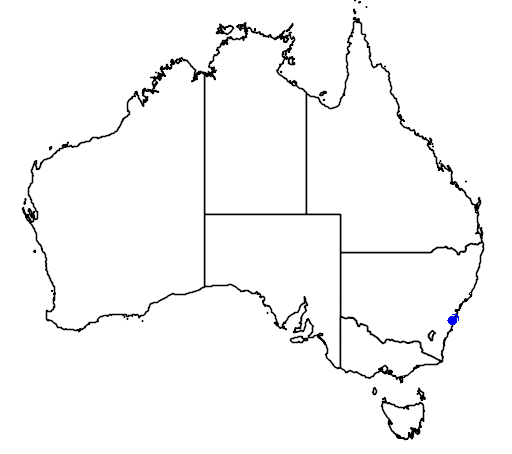
Distribution map of Meridolum marshalli
