= Meridolum corneovirens =

Conservation status
- Endangered (IUCN 2.3)

Scientific classification
- Kingdom: Animalia
- Phylum: Mollusca
- Class: Gastropoda
- Order: Stylommatophora
- Family: Camaenidae
- Genus: Meridolum
- Species: M. corneovirens

Binomial name
- Meridolum corneovirens Pfeiffer, 1851
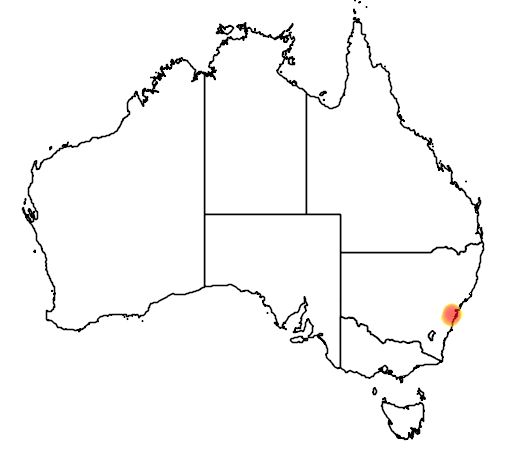
- Distribution of Meridolum corneovirens

Species of gastropod

Meridolum corneovirens, also known as the Cumberland Plain Land Snail, is a species of air-breathing land snail, terrestrial pulmonate gastropod mollusk in the family Camaenidae. This species is endemic to Australia. While little is known about the feeding habits of M. corneovirens, it appears to have a broad dietary range with a preference for fungi; it has also been reported as feeding on dead conspecifics.
