= Southern Sydney Freight Line =

- New South Wales Metropolitan Rail Area with Sydney Freight network highlighted in black

Overview
- Owner: Australian Rail Track Corporation
- Termini: Chullora; Macarthur
- Website: www.ssfl.artc.com.au

Service
- Type: Freight

History
- Opened: 21 January 2013
- 24 June 2012: Sefton Junction to Leightonfield opened
- 21 January 2013: Leightonfield to Macarthur opened

Technical
- Line length: 36 km (22 mi)
- Num of tracks: 1
- Track gauge: 1,435 mm (4 ft 8 1/2 in) standard gauge

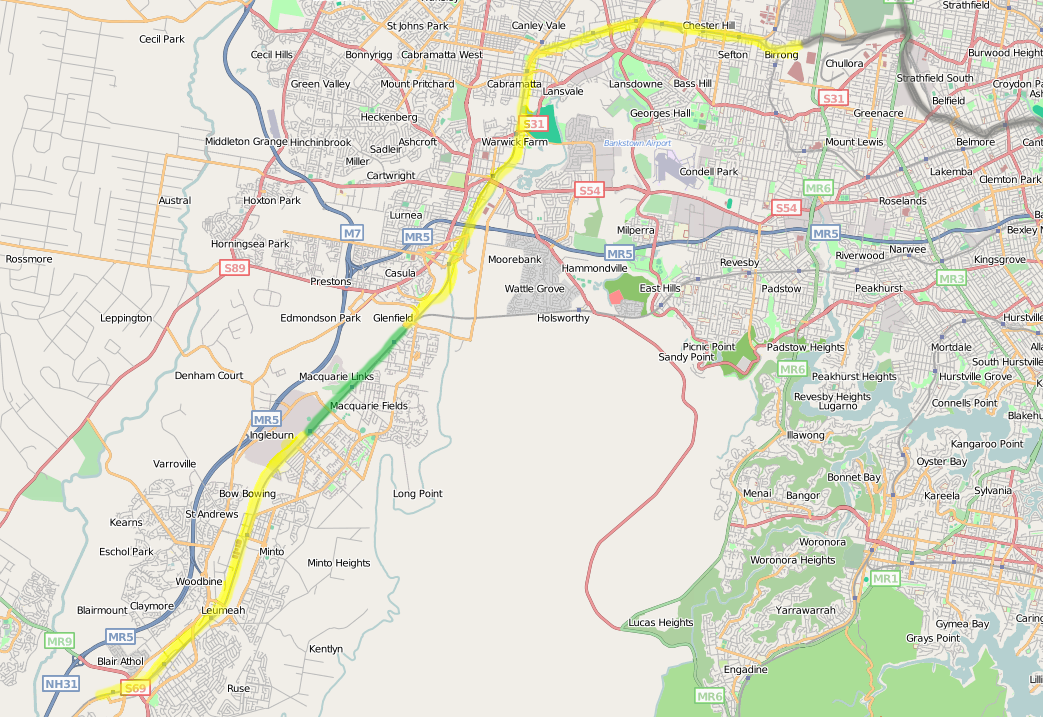
Map of the Southern Sydney Freight Line corridor Yellow: Route constructed as part of the SSFL project Green: Existing relief line incorporated into the project Grey: Existing Metropolitan Goods railway line

The Southern Sydney Freight Line (SSFL) is a freight-only railway line in the south-western suburbs of Sydney, Australia. The line was built to segregate freight trains from the Sydney Trains network. It forms part of a dedicated freight only corridor between Port Botany and Macarthur. The line is managed by the Australian Rail Track Corporation.

== Route ==
The SSFL runs from Chullora to Macarthur. It is an unelectrified, bi-directional single track with 1,800 metre long passing loops at Leightonfield and Glenfield with an additional loop at Cabramatta. Apart from its end points, the SSFL has no interface with the Transport Asset Manager network.

The line commences at Chullora connecting with the Metropolitan Goods line from Port Botany, passing beneath the Bankstown line from where it parallels the Main South line. Just to the north of Glenfield, the line crosses to the west of the Main South line via a flyover. It joins the Main South line to the south of Macarthur station.

== History ==
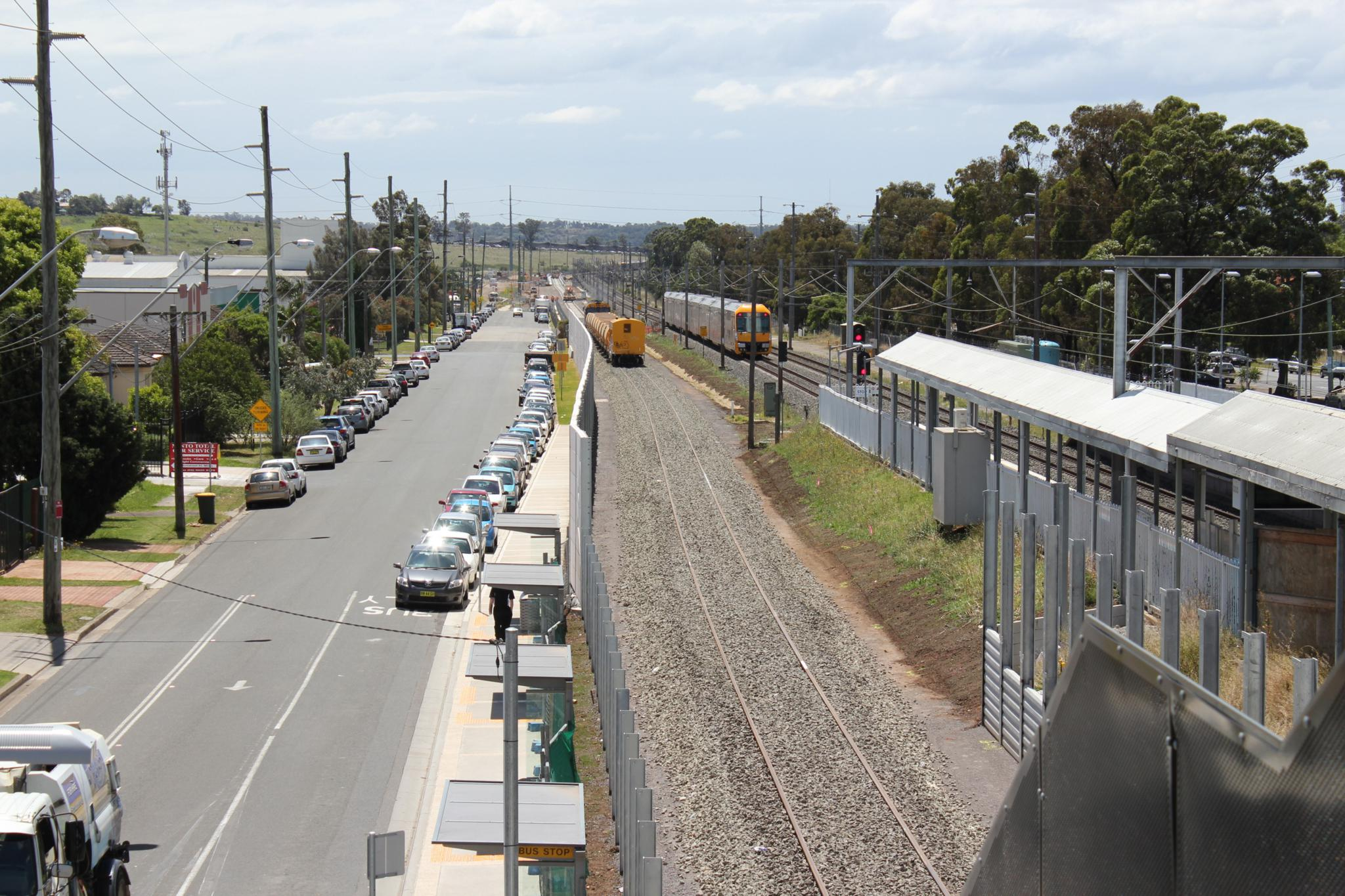
Minto station looking north in December 2012 during the final stages of construction

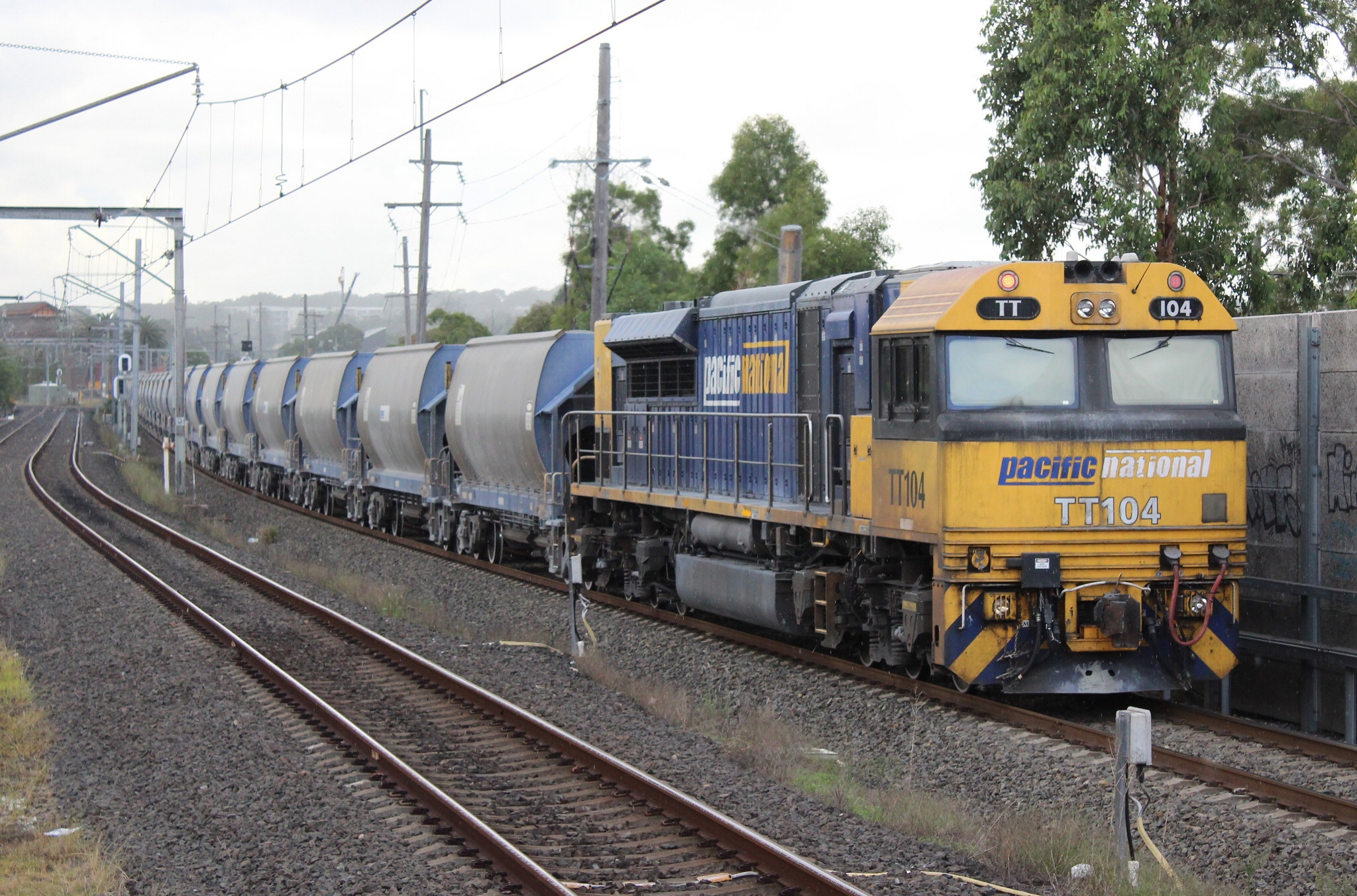
A Pacific National train on the line passing through Sefton

Delays to freight services operating to and from Sydney via the Main South line had long been a problem, but it wasn't until the formation of the National Rail Corporation that any plan was devised to resolve it.

In February 1992, the Federal Government allocated $71 million for the construction of a dedicated freight line from Chullora to Macarthur as part of the One Nation infrastructure project. It soon became apparent that to complete the project would cost in the region of $250 million. Instead the funding was used to complete a number of smaller projects, including building a 6.6 kilometre relief line between Glenfield and Ingleburn. This single, non-electrified line was used by both CountryLink passenger and freight services.

=== Construction ===
In May 2006, the Australian Rail Track Corporation (ARTC) revived the project. Approval was obtained in October 2008 and construction commenced in early 2009, focusing on the section between Sefton and Cabramatta. By August 2009 construction was under way along the whole corridor. In November 2009, poor planning led to the ARTC suspending the project for 10 months while it relocated utilities.

In September 2010, the ARTC announced the resumption of the project. On 24 June 2012, the Chullora to Leightonfield section opened allowing the connection from the BHP yard at the latter to the RailCorp network to be severed. The rest of the line opened on 21 January 2013.

In 2019, a triangular junction to the Moorebank Intermodal Terminal opened.

In 2024, an additional 1,650 metre passing loop between Cabramatta and Warwick Farm stations was completed, running mostly parallel to the existing track.

==== Station works ====
The construction of the new line required modifications to several stations along the route. Sefton, Warwick Farm, Casula and Minto received upgrades. A new concourse was constructed at Cabramatta and the footbridge was extended at Leumeah.

== Services ==
The line is normally only used by freight services, but during engineering possessions on the adjacent Transport Asset Manager tracks, NSW TrainLink XPT services have travelled on it. Freight trains travelling to the Minto Intermodal Terminal continue to travel on Transport Asset Manager tracks.

== See also ==
- Rail Clearways Program
- Northern Sydney Freight Corridor – a similar project in the north
- Western Sydney Freight Line
- Regional Rail Link – a similar project in Melbourne separating local and long-distance services
