= Leumeah railway station =

Railway station in Sydney, New South Wales, Australia

Leumeah
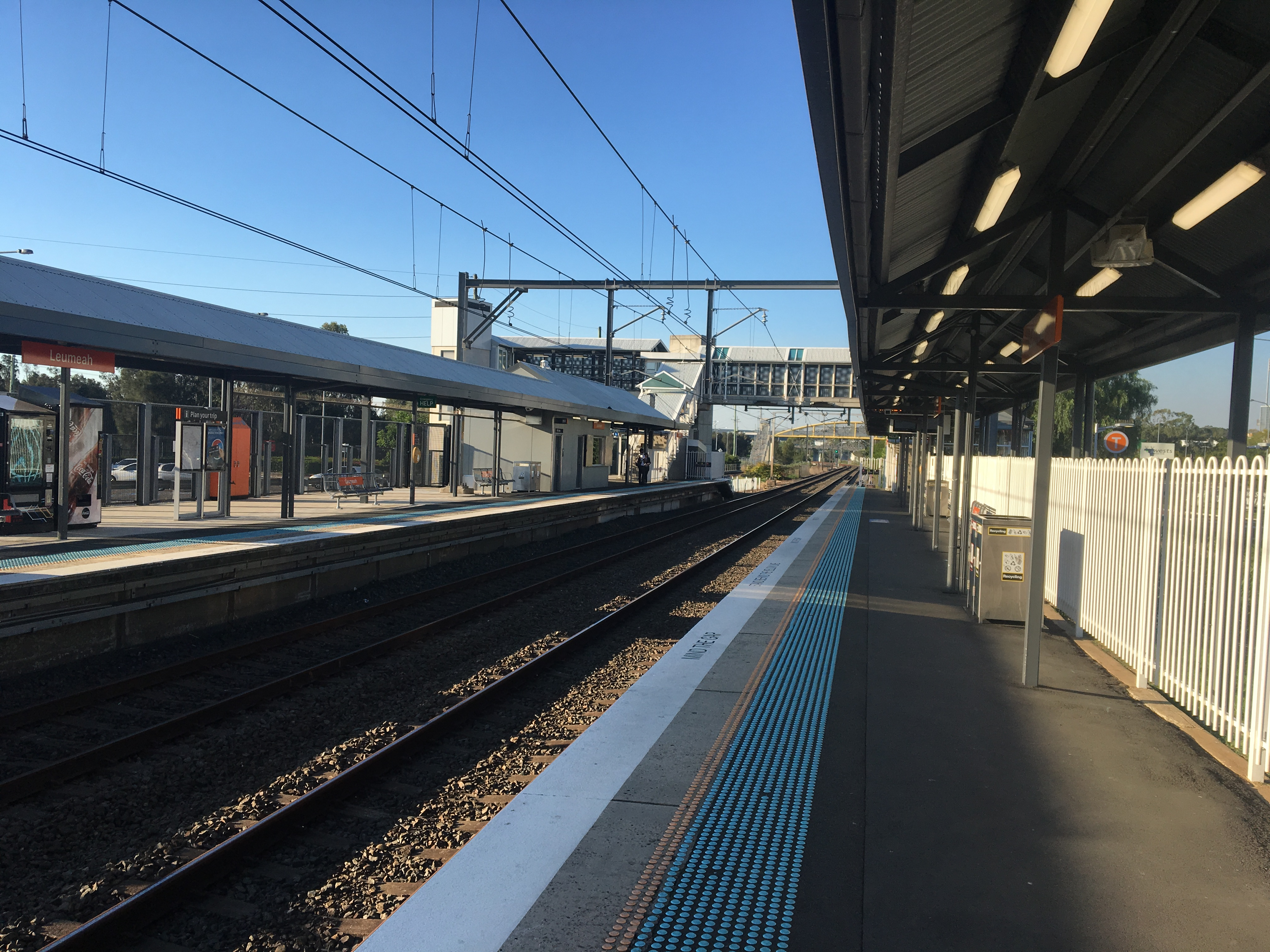
- Station platforms, shelters and concourse, April 2019

General information
- Location: O'Sullivan Road, Leumeah
- Coordinates: 34°03′03″S 150°49′49″E
- Elevation: 54 metres (177 ft)
- Owner: Transport Asset Manager of New South Wales
- Operator: Sydney Trains
- Line: Main Southern
- Distance: 39.6 kilometres (24.6 mi) from Central
- Platforms: 2 side
- Tracks: 3
- Connections: Bus

Construction
- Structure type: Ground
- Accessible: Yes

Other information
- Status: Weekdays: Staffed: 6am to 7pm: Weekends and public holidays: Staffed: 8am to 4pm
- Station code: LUM
- Website: Transport for NSW

History
- Opened: 1886

Passengers
- 2025: 1,273,282 (year); 3,488 (daily) (Sydney Trains)
- Rank: 110

Services
| Preceding station | Sydney Trains | Following station |
|---|---|---|
| Campbelltown towards Macarthur | T8 Airport & South Line | Minto towards City Circle |
Location

Leumeah railway station is a suburban railway station located on the Main Southern line, serving the Sydney suburb of Leumeah. It is served by Sydney Trains T8 Airport & South Line services.

== History ==
Leumeah station opened in 1886. It was initially named "Holly Lea". but was subsequently renamed prior to its first appearance in timetables.

The station is the main access station for Campbelltown Stadium, being situated 450 metres away from the ground. It is home to the A-League football team Macarthur FC and the Wests Tigers National Rugby League team.

The station was initially made wheelchair accessible in 2004 with a complete lift to each platform. However, the station received a third lift on the western side of the station in 2012, due to the Southern Sydney Freight Line removing pedestrian access to the Platform 1 lift.

In January 2013, the Southern Sydney Freight Line opened to the west of the station.

Since the second half of 2017, Leumeah railway station has been served exclusively by the Airport and East Hills line, meaning commuters have to change at Glenfield to travel to either the city via Granville station or to Blacktown station via the Cumberland Line.

== Platforms and services ==
| Platform | Line | Stopping pattern | Notes |
| 1 | T8 Airport & South Line | services to Central & the City Circle via the Airport; 6 weekday morning peak services to Central & the City Circle via Sydenham | |
| 2 | T8 Airport & South Line | services to Macarthur; 13 weekday evening peak services to Campbelltown | |

== Transport links ==
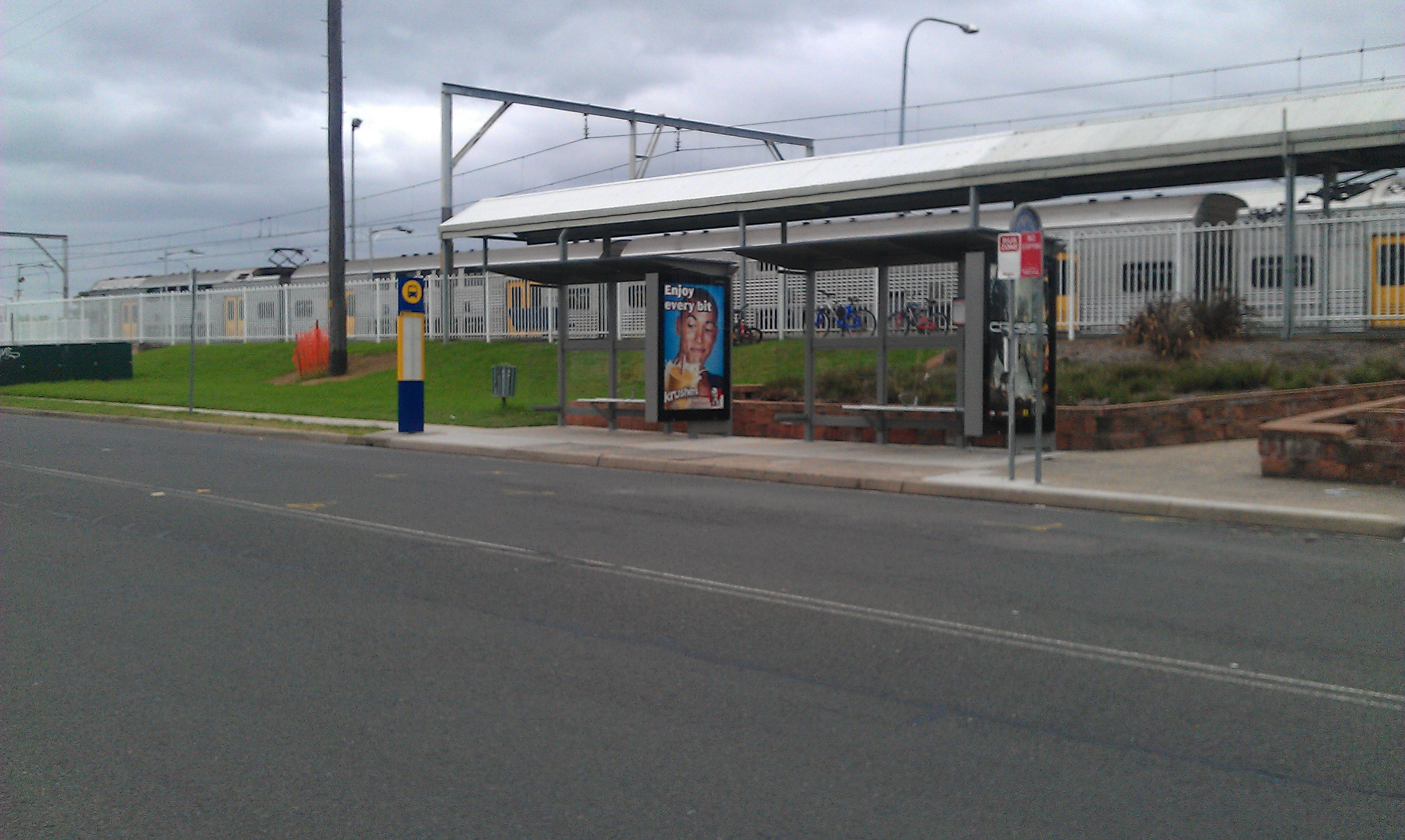
Bus stop on the eastern side of the station serving Busabout route 881 and Interline routes 870–872

Transit Systems operates five bus routes via Leumeah station, under contract to Transport for NSW:

- 870: Campbelltown Hospital to Liverpool station
- 871: Campbelltown Hospital to Liverpool station
- 872: Campbelltown Hospital to Liverpool station
- 879: to Campbelltown station
- 881: Leumeah North to Campbelltown station

Leumeah station is served by one NightRide route:

- N30: Macarthur station to Town Hall station
