= New South Wales Metropolitan Rail Area =

- Suburban portion of the New South Wales metropolitan rail area, showing terminal locations

Overview
- Status: Active
- Owner: Transport Asset Manager of New South Wales
- Locale: Sydney; Central Coast; Newcastle; Blue Mountains; Illawarra
- Termini: Central; Newcastle Interchange; Bowenfels; Macarthur; Bomaderry
- Website: Transport Asset Manager

Service
- Type: Commuter rail
- Operator: Sydney Trains

History
- Opened: 1 January 2004 (as MRA)

Technical
- Track gauge: Standard gauge
- Electrification: Overhead 1500 V DC

The New South Wales Metropolitan Rail Area (MRA) is the government-operated railway network centred on Sydney and bounded by Newcastle Interchange in the north, Bowenfels in the west, and Glenlee and Bomaderry in the south. The MRA contains the entirety of the state's electrified rail network (save for the isolated Skitube). The MRA is owned by Transport Asset Manager and maintained by Sydney Trains.

== Background ==
Prior to 2004, the entire NSW Government-owned rail network was operated by the then Rail Infrastructure Corporation (RIC). In preparation for the planned lease of the interstate and Hunter Valley networks to the Australian Rail Track Corporation (ARTC), the Transport Administration Act 1988 was amended in 2003 to define a "metropolitan rail area", to be managed by a new agency called RailCorp. The residual non-metropolitan, non-ARTC network remained with RIC as the Country Regional Network, and is now managed directly by Transport for NSW.

== Boundaries ==
At its northern extent, the MRA is bounded by the terminal station Newcastle Interchange, and previously by the former terminal station at Newcastle. The northern section of the network extends 165 kilometres from Central and is electrified for its entire length. The Main North railway continues north from Broadmeadow into the ARTC-operated Hunter Valley network.

At its western extent, the MRA is bounded by the former station at Bowenfels, a few kilometres west of the town of Lithgow. In practice, the last MRA station is Lithgow. The western section of the network extends 158 kilometres from Central and is electrified for its entire length. The Main West railway continues west from Bowenfels into the Transport for New South Wales operated Country Regional Network.

At its south-western extent, the MRA is bounded by the rural locality of Glenlee. The last metropolitan station is Macarthur, in Campbelltown. The south-western section of the network extends 58 kilometres from Central and is electrified for its entire length. The Main South railway continues south from Glenlee into the ARTC-operated interstate network.

At its south-eastern extent, the MRA is bounded by Bomaderry station. The south-eastern ("Illawarra") section of the network extends 154 kilometres from Central and is electrified as far south as Kiama (119 kilometres from Central). Bomaderry is also the terminus of the South Coast railway. The ARTC-operated interstate network joins the South Coast railway at Unanderra, south of Wollongong.

The Southern Sydney Freight Line and Sydney Freight Network are physically within, but do not form part of, the MRA. These are reserved for use by freight trains and are operated and maintained by ARTC.

== Operations ==
All Sydney Trains services operate within the MRA. NSW TrainLink intercity and regional services operate within and beyond the MRA.

== See also ==
- Sydney Trains
- NSW TrainLink
- Australian Rail Track Corporation
