= New South Wales Railways =

New South Wales Railways may refer to rail transport in New South Wales or one of a number of government agencies that have been responsible for operating railway services in the Australian state of New South Wales:

- New South Wales Government Railways from 1855 until 1932
- Department of Railways New South Wales from 1932 until 1972
- Public Transport Commission from 1972 until 1980
- State Rail Authority from 1980 until 2003
- RailCorp from 2003 until 2013
- NSW TrainLink since 2013
