= WSFL =

WSFL may refer to:

- Web Services Flow Language, an XML language proposed by IBM to describe the composition of Web services
- Western Sydney Freight Line, a proposed railway line in Sydney, Australia
- WSFL-TV, a television station (channel 27, virtual channel 39) licensed to Miami, Florida, United States
- WSFL-FM, a radio station (106.5 FM) licensed to New Bern, North Carolina, United States
- Western States Football League
- Windows Subsystem for Linux
- Women's Spring Football League
