= Minto railway station =

Railway station in Sydney, New South Wales, Australia

Minto
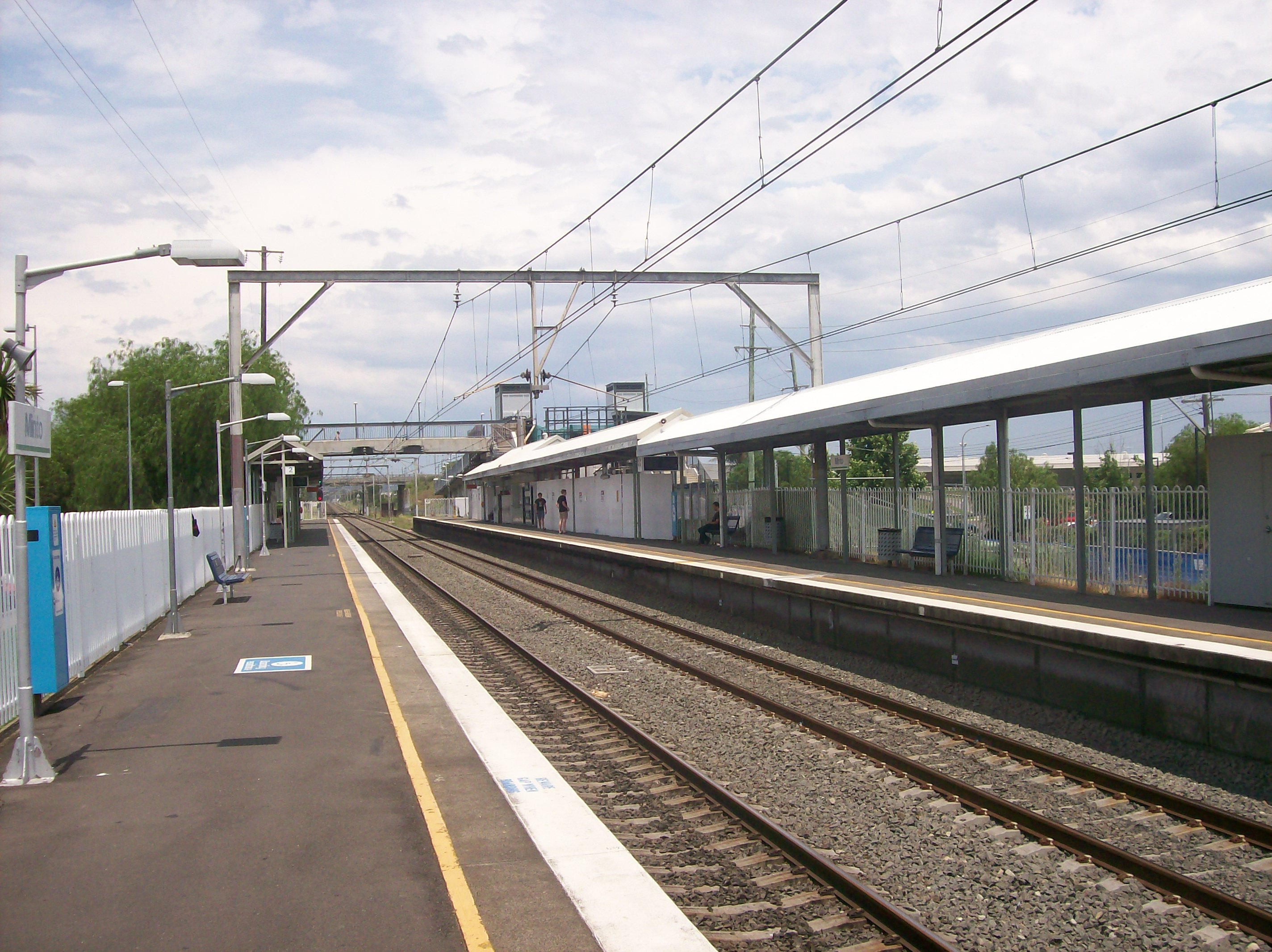
- Southbound view from Platform 2, November 2011

General information
- Location: Somerset Street, Minto
- Coordinates: 34°01′38″S 150°50′33″E
- Elevation: 45 metres (148 ft)
- Owner: Transport Asset Manager of New South Wales
- Operator: Sydney Trains
- Line: Main Southern
- Distance: 37.7 kilometres (23.4 mi) from Central
- Platforms: 2 side
- Tracks: 3
- Connections: Bus

Construction
- Structure type: Ground
- Accessible: Yes

Other information
- Status: Weekdays: Staffed: 6am to 7pm: Weekends and public holidays: Staffed: 8am to 4pm
- Station code: MIO
- Website: Transport for NSW

History
- Opened: May 1874
- Former names: Campbellfields (1874–1886)

Passengers
- 2025: 1,506,863 (year); 4,128 (daily) (Sydney Trains)
- Rank: 94

Services
Preceding station	Sydney Trains	Following station
Leumeah towards Macarthur	T8 Airport & South Line	Ingleburn towards City Circle
Location

Minto railway station is located on the Main Southern line, serving the Sydney suburb of Minto. It is served by Sydney Trains' T8 Airport & South line services.

== History ==
Currently, Minto Railway Station is a stop on the timetable much like its adjacent stations of Leumeah (south) and Ingleburn (north). However, this station has a detailed history.

On 29 October 1856, it was announced that the Great Southern Railway was to be extended [single line] from Liverpool to Campbelltown and it was to pass through the Minto Parish. This rail line was subsequently opened 4 May 1858 with stations between Liverpool and Campbelltown yet to be determined.

Progressively, stations began appearing between Liverpool and Campbelltown with Glenfield, and Macquarie Fields having been already added by 1874.

Initially, a temporary platform had been erected next to Campbell Fields for the use of the nearby encamped Volunteer Force on the weekend of 23–25 May 1874 with a service scheduled for the Friday before that weekend. A newspaper report on the activities of that weekend described Campbell Fields as having a "commodious" siding. The Minto Parish was often used as a training ground for the Volunteer force and this platform provided facilities for visitors to alight from Sydney (and elsewhere) to observe the activities. But its future was not guaranteed as the New South Wales parliament debated on its continued existence. In the meantime, the platform was being used by the public at least on an "excursion" basis.

It seems the platform's future was looking bright as, in October 1876, it was published in the Great Southern Railway timetable as, Campbellfields (although some newspapers, and even government publications, published this name as Campbell Fields) acquiring the name from the nearby property of Dr. William Redfern's "Campbell Fields". Initially, the platform was the recipient of three Down services and three Up services (with an additional Up and Down service on Saturdays). Passengers alighting here were to notify the guard of the train at the previous stopping station as this platform only picked up and set down when required. Travel time was approximately 1 hour and 25 minutes from Sydney (via "Parramatta Junction", Fairfield, and Liverpool).

The future of this railway location received a significant boost when, in 1877, the NSW Parliament Legislative Council stated, "the traffic manager had recommended a new platform and waiting shed for Campbellfields.

By 1882, at some point between February and March, Campbellfields was renamed to Minto. For a period of time, this platform was referred to as "Minto (late Campbell Fields)" in various timetables and government gazettes.

Minto now received four down and four up weekday services with an additional up and down service on Saturdays. Despite additional stops being added to the timetable, travel time from Sydney varied little from the previous 1 hour and 25 minutes.

It seems the platform was important to the community with an 1883 article in the Campbelltown Herald focusing on the duties of the Traffic Inspector at the station where they more than earned, "a fair day's work for a far day's wage." At the time, Minto received goods from the surrounding area such as firewood, and was an offloading point for cement.

The importance of the platform to the community continued to grow and in 1885, a Post Office was established. It was noted at the time that farmers in the vicinity "find the platform very convenient for forwarding their produce".

On 2 December 1890, the NSW Department of Railways issued a tender for "Erection and completion of Waiting Sheds (wood) at Glenfield, Macquarie Fields, Ingleburn, Minto, Leumeah, on the Great Southern Line.". This tender was subsequently won by Le Breton & Son 30 December 1890.

By June 1891, the line between Liverpool and Campbelltown had been duplicated (with some exceptions). It is not clear if Minto possessed a second platform at this time or if it was to receive one at a later date as, "At Glenfield, Macquarie Fields, Ingleburn and Leumeah there will be a second platform, but no other alterations or additions of importance are to be made." There are indications there were multiple platforms by at least 1895. It is unclear when Minto started to be referred to as a "station" although by 1884 this term was occasionally attributed to the structure.

Throughout the 1890s, Minto continued to be the scene of goods loading (such as firewood, potatoes, mushrooms, lucerne/hay, block wood, fruit, sheep, cattle, and milk) from the surrounding area and transported to Redfern markets for sale. The surround bush provided a large quantity of wood (sourced mainly from along St Andrews Road) such that consignees of goods at the station were complaining of their ability to access their goods from the shed. Adjoining the goods yard was, "an enormous [sawmill] and every day two or three trucks of block wood were consigned to the city market."

In the morning, the goods train locally known as the "Minto Truck", would arrive from Sydney, be unloaded, and the trucks shunted off to the siding. Fruit, when in season, would then be loaded into the trucks for collection later in the day. The milk train from Picton (also known as "Milk Pot") would arrive and be loaded with milk cans from the local area. As many as 40 carts would, "back up to unload milk and some had to pull out to let late arrivals unload." These milk cans were, "all consigned through to Sydney for the Dairy Farmers and Fresh Food & Ice Companies."

On 23 January 1902, government announced that land was to be acquired for the construction of a gatehouse on the eastern side of the railway line along Minto Road as well as an expansion of the rail yard. Additionally, the government awarded tenders for the construction of the gatekeeper's cottage.

Due to the increasing population of the area, in 1903, a movement began to relocate the Post Office from the station to somewhere more accessible while also avoiding the need for people to cross the rail line. The majority of the population, at the time, was located on the eastern side of the railway line.

Meeting minutes from the Minto Progress Committee indicates there being a Goods Shed at the station. The Committee resolved to ask the railway commissioners for a weighing machine and the raising of the milk cart stand.

In 1905, Minto station witnessed the start of a conflagration that allegedly began from a spark from a railway engine and "spread with great rapidity, and covered some miles of country in its course"

Newspaper articles indicate that the rate of firewood stored at the station did not decline over the previous years. And with Minto station being no stranger to it, on 12 September 1907, a fire occurred in the sawmill, [again] allegedly started due to a spark from a locomotive located in the railway yard (although an alternate theory is from a "swaggie's" fire). The fire began in a stack of about 150 tons of firewood in the railway yard resulting in over 1500 tons (spread over an acre) of firewood having been burnt. The fire required a locomotive with tanks full of water to assist with controlling the blaze which burned for weeks. The sawmill ceased operations as a result of this fire.

From one extreme to another, during March 1913, Minto railway station was the scene of a washaway as a result of storms hitting the area. A washaway nearly occurred again in March 1914 where, "The water is over the railway at Minto, and there is a possibility of a washaway occurring if the rain continues."

Location

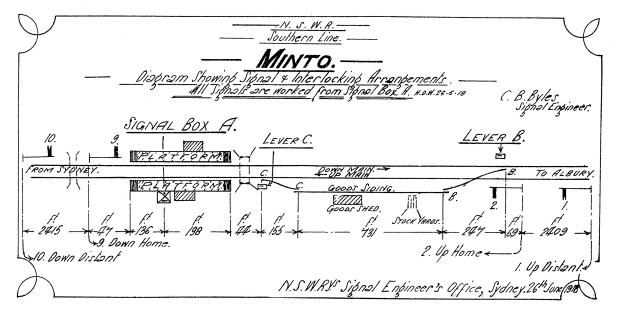
Minto Railway Station yard diagram 1918

Leading into 1935, Minto station had a yard, a Goods shed, an engine shed and railway workshop. The station was a significant point for the loading of milk from the local area where, "in the olden days the whole length of the platform was a line of milk carts backed up waiting for the 'milk' train."

It appears a significant number of cattle was in the area to produce this milk as, at the time in 1935, Campbelltown Council erected a standpipe and water trough near the station for watering stock.

Electricity came to Minto in 1935 and the Railway Department soon took advantage of it as it announced on 17 September 1937, that electric lighting was to be installed at the station. This followed the announcement by the Railway Commissioners in August 1929 to allow for the electricity main running along the southern line to be, "tapped at Minto to provide current for the town."

Station gardens were a long-established tradition for railway stations. The Railway Commissioners even established a competition judging the best gardens. In 1938, it was Minto's turn to receive a mention having secured, "a Special Prize of £1/1/- for a newly formed garden."

By 1943, Minto station was still a stop of significance but it's time as a stop for all trains passing through had ceased. The Southern Highlands Express discontinued allowing passengers from Sydney to alight at Minto (among other nearby stations) causing some consternation in the community. During World War II, a large shed was erected besides the goods shed and was used by the Department of the Army to store biscuits.

In its history, Minto hosted three level crossings: two to the north with one at 30 miles 35 chains and 50 links, and the other at Minto Road (30 miles and 22 chains), and one on the south side at Redfern Road. In 1922, a petition to the railway commissioners was successful resulting in the installation of, "wicket gates" at the Sydney-side level crossing.

By 1954, however, the number of crossings was to be rationalised to one when the Office of the Secretary for Railways announced the closure of the northern crossings. The last remnants hinting at this crossing is the gatekeeper's cottage (constructed in 1902) on the curve of Minto Road near the railway line.

At some point after World War II and the electrification of the line, the daily goods train ceased to operate due to changes in modes of transporting goods from the area. As a result, the goods yard and trucking facilities became redundant. Subsequently, the goods yard, siding, and associated infrastructure, was removed.

The next major event for the station was the electrification of the line from Liverpool to Campbelltown in 1968.

The last railway crossing was removed in 1993 via the construction of the Ben Lomond overbridge south of the previous crossing.

The Southern Sydney Freight Line passes by the western side of the station. As part of its construction work, Minto received an upgrade with lifts to the platforms, which was complete in 2012.

Since the second half of 2017, Minto railway station has been served exclusively by the Airport and East Hills line, meaning commuters have to change at Glenfield to travel to either the city via Granville or to Blacktown via the Cumberland Line.

== Platforms and services ==
Platform	Line	Stopping pattern	Notes
1	T8 Airport & South Line	services to Central & the City Circle via the Airport; 6 weekday morning peak services to Central & the City Circle via Sydenham	
2	T8 Airport & South Line	services to Macarthur; 6 weekday evening peak services to Campbelltown	

== Freight ==
Since 2013, long-distance freight trains have had their own separate track, the Southern Sydney Freight Line.

The Macarthur International Shipping Terminal which is an inland port is owned by Qube Logistics and is located south of Minto station. It consists of a crossover and a siding. Qube Logistics operates both trip trains which carry containers from Port Botany. Qube also runs these trains to its facilities at Yennora and its newly opened terminal at Moorebank. Qube also runs malt and barley trains from Melbourne to Minto. These services run to Enfield Yard where the locomotives switch ends before continuing the journey to Minto.

== Transport links ==
Transit Systems operates five bus routes via Minto station, under contract to Transport for NSW:

- 850: to Narellan
- 873: to Ingleburn
- 874: to Raby
- 875: to St Andrews
- 880: to Campbelltown station

Minto station is served by one NightRide route:

- N30: Macarthur station to Town Hall station
