= Western Sydney Freight Line =

Proposed railway line in Sydney, Australia

- New South Wales metropolitan rail area, with Western Sydney Freight Line corridor highlighted in yellow

Overview
- Status: Proposed
- Locale: Western Sydney
- Termini: Villawood; St Marys

Service
- Type: Freight rail
- System: Sydney Freight Network

History
- Opened: 2030

Technical
- Track gauge: Standard gauge
- Electrification: None
Map of Stage 1

The Western Sydney Freight Line (WSFL) is a proposed freight railway line between the Main Western railway line at St Marys and the Southern Sydney Freight Line (SSFL) at Villawood, via a new intermodal terminal near Eastern Creek. The NSW Government committed to establishing a corridor for the future WSFL as part of its Freight & Ports Strategy in 2013. Corridor preservation for the WSFL is also considered a priority under the State Infrastructure Strategy. Constraints analysis and consultation took place between 2015 and 2017, with the line in operation "before 2030". The project is expected to cost in the order of $1 billion.

== Corridor ==
While a precise alignment for stage 2 of the WSFL has yet to be selected, maps released by Transport for NSW show the line running south-east from St Marys in the vicinity of Ropes Creek, running east on the south side of the M4 Western Motorway, then south-east towards Eastern Creek. From here, the corridor crosses the Westlink M7 motorway at a point between Prospect Reservoir and the Horsley Drive, crosses the Old Main South railway near Yennora and joins the SSFL at Villawood.

== Background ==
Over the course of the late 20th century, factories and other industrial land uses vacated much of the inner city, relocating to sites in Western Sydney. This created a significant freight task in moving cargo between Sydney Airport and Port Botany in the inner city and new industrial areas in the west. At the same time, the growth in patronage on the suburban rail system has limited the number of train "paths" available to freight trains accessing Port Botany from outside of Sydney, particularly during the morning and evening peak.

The State's long-term objective is to separate freight and passenger trains on their own dedicated tracks within the Metropolitan Rail Area. The first major piece of this work, connecting the Main Southern railway in Sydney's south-west to the port, opened in 2012 as the SSFL. A second program of works, to progressively separate freight and passenger trains travelling to and from the Main Northern railway – the Northern Sydney Freight Corridor program – began in 2011. A third element, the Maldon–Dombarton rail link, would allow freight trains to bypass the Illawarra line between Sydney and Port Kembla.

Western Sydney Freight Line corridor identification and draft strategic environmental assessment documents were prepared in 2018.
