= Holly Lea and Plough Inn =

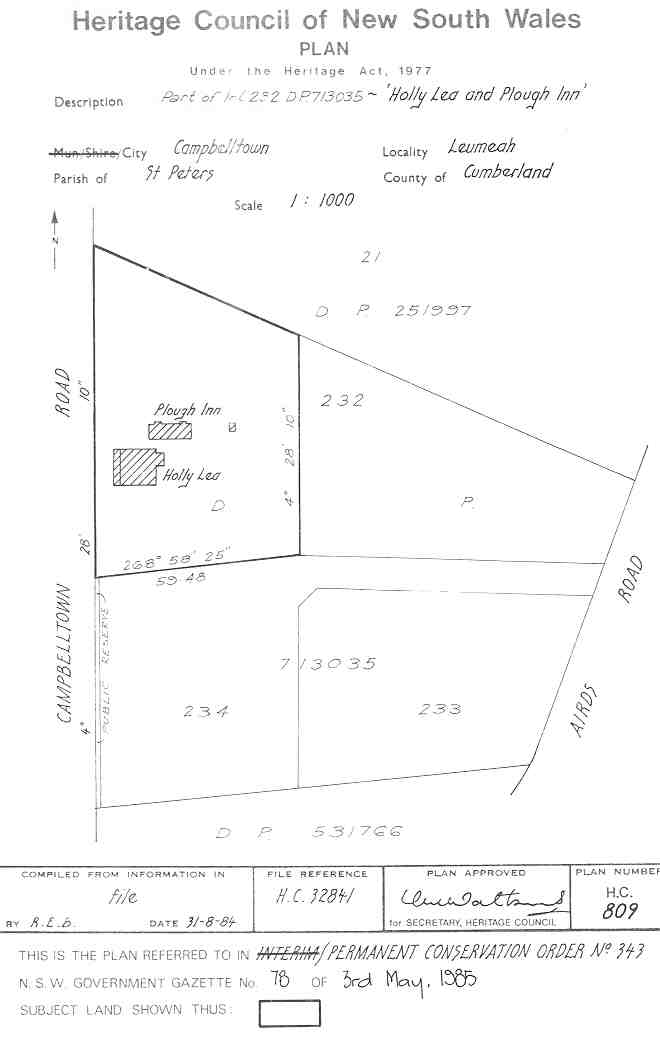
- Heritage boundaries

- Location within Sydney Location within Australia
- 34°02′53″S 150°49′45″E
- Location: Holly Lea Road, Leumeah, City of Campbelltown, New South Wales, Australia

History
- Built: 1816–

New South Wales Heritage Register
- Official name: Holly Lea & Plough Inn; Plough Inn; 'Three Brothers' (inn); 'The Travellers' Home' (inn); Borobine House; Hollylea; William Ray's Cottage Inn Coolroom
- Type: State heritage (complex / group)
- Designated: 2 April 1999
- Reference no.: 343
- Type: Inn/Tavern
- Category: Commercial
- Builders: William Ray

Holly Lea and Plough Inn is a heritage-listed site on Holly Lea Road in Leumeah, New South Wales, an outer suburb of Sydney, Australia. The heritage listing includes a former residence, an inn and a storage shed. It was built from 1816 by William Ray. It is also known as Plough Inn; Three Brothers (inn); The Travellers' Home (inn); Borobine House; Hollylea; and William Ray's Cottage Inn Coolroom. The property is privately owned. It was added to the New South Wales State Heritage Register on 2 April 1999.

== History ==
=== Plough Inn ===
The Plough Inn was constructed c. 1816 on 24 hectares (60 acres) of land purchased by William Ray (1772–1835), a convict transported for burglary. He arrived in Sydney on 13 October 1791 on the Albermarle, married Sarah M Harrigan (1793–) and had three children between 1809 and 1822.

There are references in the Campbelltown & Airds Historical Society Journal volume 1 no. 3 to William Ray conducting the Plough Inn as early as 1821. Descendants of Ray have claimed that his daughter Maria was born in a sandstone cottage on the site in 1822.

Ray built the inn between 1816–21 and sold it in February 1826 to Nathaniel Boon (1791–1839), a convict transported for burglary (arrived 29 September 1811 in Sydney), who was recorded in the November 1828 Census as living in Airds. William Ray died on 18 October 1835 aged 63 and was buried in St. Peter's Cemetery, Campbelltown.

=== Holly Lea ===
Boon arranged an 1829 mortgage of A£252 on the property which is believed to have been used to build the present two storey brick residence.

Boon married Sarah Wade on 27 July 1831 and c.1830 had triplet sons. c. 1830 Boon built "Holly Lea" and that same time he was licensee of "The Three Brothers". Boon licensed the property in July 1832 as "The Three Brothers" and this license was renewed until at least 1835. Nathaniel Boon died on 15 February 1839.

On 25 December 1845 William Ray Jr. (one of William & Sarah's two sons) leased the Plough Inn and Holly Lea from Boon's widow, Sarah. In 1857 William Ray Jr. was named in the Publicans' Index for "The Travellers" Home' (also leasing the inn off Sarah Harrigan (Boon). By 1869 he was declared insolvent. That year John Jenkins bought the site due to Hay's insolvency. Jenkins had married Sarah's daughter Maria Ray and acquired the property from William Ray Jr in 1869.

By 1884 the site was called "Borobine House" and had a new owner, The Hon. John Davies CMG. Davies renamed it "Holly Lea" and continued to live there until he died in 1896. Sarah Boon died on 5 July 1887, aged 93. By c. 1900 the site was operating as a private boarding school. By c. 1914 it was again a private residence.

In 1922 Arthur Payten was its owner and used the site as a farm and his widow continued to live there almost until 1957 when it was bought by Mervyn Whitten The buildings were derelict by then. After 1957 M. & K. Whitten, his wife and family made a great deal of repairs to renovate the property and make it habitable, painting, laying a concrete floor, installing hessian ceilings and rebuilding the chimneys. They continued to run the property as a dairy farm until the late 1960s when most of the land was resumed for industrial purposes by Campbelltown City Council.

Since then Mr & Mrs Whitten have used the buildings and a small area of land about them as a private home. In recent years the buildings were listed by the National Trust of Australia (NSW) and the Heritage Council of NSW. The property was placed on the market for sale in c. 1980.

The immediately-previous owner Alwyn Hutchinson used the property for nominal storage purposes. That owner indicated that prior to purchasing the property in c. 1990, it had been used for "casual retail" functions.

== Description ==
There are presently (c. 1980) six buildings on the site, of which three only have been considered by the National Trust of Australia (NSW) as being of some historic significance. The other three are a timber-framed garage, a detached fernery and a corrugated iron farm shed, all built by Mr Whitten and not of apparent historic significance.

The remaining three buildings are composed of:

Plough Inn, c. 1816

The single storey inn of three rooms was built c. 1816 (Sheedy (c. 1980) says c. 1820) of sandstone walls nominally 450 millimetres (18 in) thick to the exterior in uncoursed rubble and coursed dressed material and one interior wall apparently built as the main accommodation building for the inn. Another interior wall is of sandstock bricks nominally 230 millimetres (9.1 in) thick.

Floors are cement-paved. It has two fireplaces and chimneys to the northern face. All wall faces are painted. The pitched roof is covered with corrugated iron sheets and matching roof covers.

The roof is constructed of trimmed tree poles, covered in she-oak (Casuarina sp.) shingles, now sheeted in corrugated iron. Gutters and downpipes are modern. Roof timber members appear to be original including wide and close centre battens, round section rafters and collar ties and some ceiling joists.

The ceiling is of canvas on a timber frame and both this and the walls have been lime-washed. When purchased by Mr Whitten the north-west corner had partly collapsed as had one of the chimneys and these were rebuilt.

The building is used as a store room, workshop and family entertaining areas. It is in excellent condition (c. 1980) although there is some evidence of sandstone fretting to the south wall probably caused by rising damp. The ground outside this area appears to have been built up and paved with pre-cast concrete pavers.

Holly Lea, c. 1830

Two storey sandstock brick residence apparently built as the main accommodation building for the inn. Verandah and balcony face the main road with a skillion roofed area at the rear. Two storey part is of four rooms with central hall and staircase while rear skillion-roofed part comprises five rooms containing kitchen, dining room, bathroom, sun room and toilet. This arrangement was made by Mr Whitten after enclosing a verandah and incorporating it into a dwelling space. The first floor is used for bedrooms. A 1914 photograph shows the building basically as it is with cast iron balcony posts, valances and balustrades and stuccoed walls. It is assumed that during the ownership of John Davies this building was given its late Victorian appearance.

There is a hip roof of she-oak shingles under corrugated iron. The floors are timber, presently covered with body carpet and concrete floors at the rear are tiled. Because of its derelict state when purchased, Mr Whitten rebuilt the ground floors, replaced the lath-and plaster ceilings with fibrous plaster, remade the ground floor doors and part of the staircase to the original pattern and rebuilt the verandah and balcony. While the cast iron columns are original the decorative ironwork has been replaced by cast aluminium of similar pattern. The verandah is now cement-paved and external walls have been given a rough-cast rendered finish.

Internally the plaster walls show some evidence of dampness but otherwise the condition of the building appears to be very good. The front door is six-panelled with a rectangular fanlight over, internal doors are four-panelled, windows are two panes of double hung sash pattern and there are paired French windows opening onto the balcony. The building has been used as a self-contained dwelling for approximately 26 years.

Farm Shed (pre-1880)

This small, sandstock brick building has a she-oak (shingle) hip roof sheeted with corrugated iron and a single, vertically boarded timber door. IT has a floor partly of brick and is without a ceiling and appears to be only in fair condition. Its date is uncertain but taking into consideration its materials, it would appear to have been built prior to 1880.

Records and photographs have indicated that a ball room was built between the inn and the main road and there were a number of timber outbuildings at the rear but these have all now disappeared.

=== Modifications and dates ===
- c. 1957: major changes of a concrete floor infill to each room, installation of plywood and painted hessian ceilings was made. The roof of the inn was corrugated iron by this time.
- A c. 1979 photograph shows unpainted external walls (there may be remains of paint on joints between stones or lime mortar repointing.
- c. 1980: painting of exterior walls occurred as part of the site's development c. 1980. At that time the area immediately around the inn had major landscaping changes. The current arrangement of each building being treated as a separate "unit" under the strata title for the overall property started c.1980.

== Heritage listing ==
Holly Lea and Plough Inn was listed on the New South Wales State Heritage Register on 2 April 1999.

== Gallery ==
Holly Lea and former Plough Inn in 2023
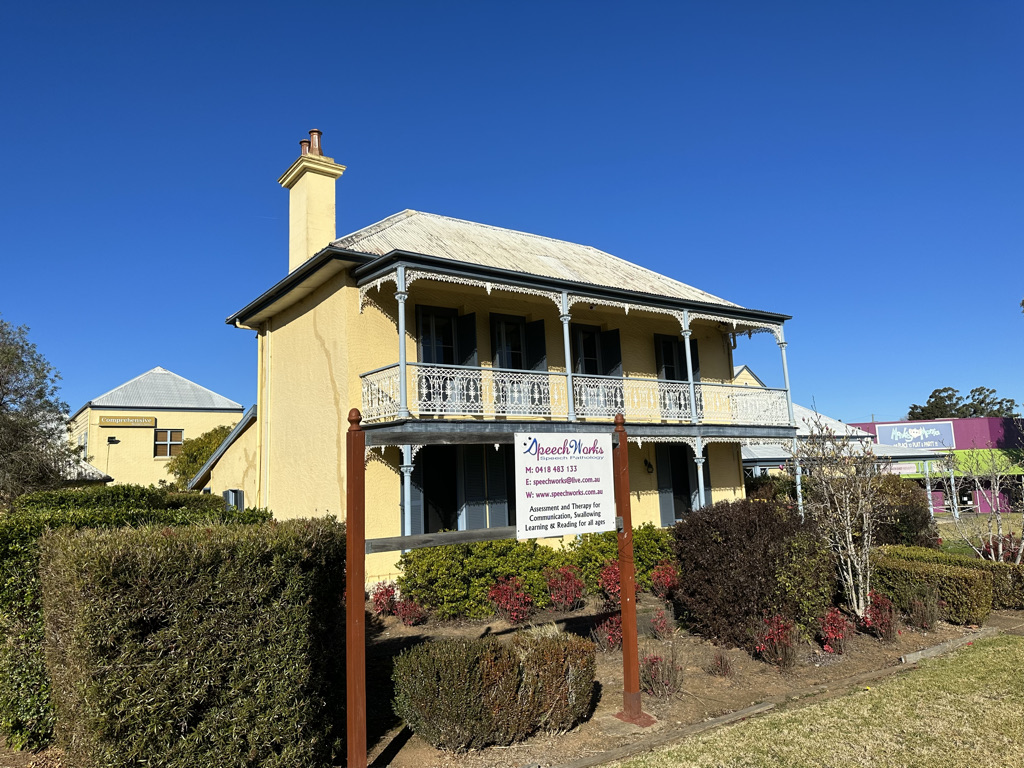
Write a caption here

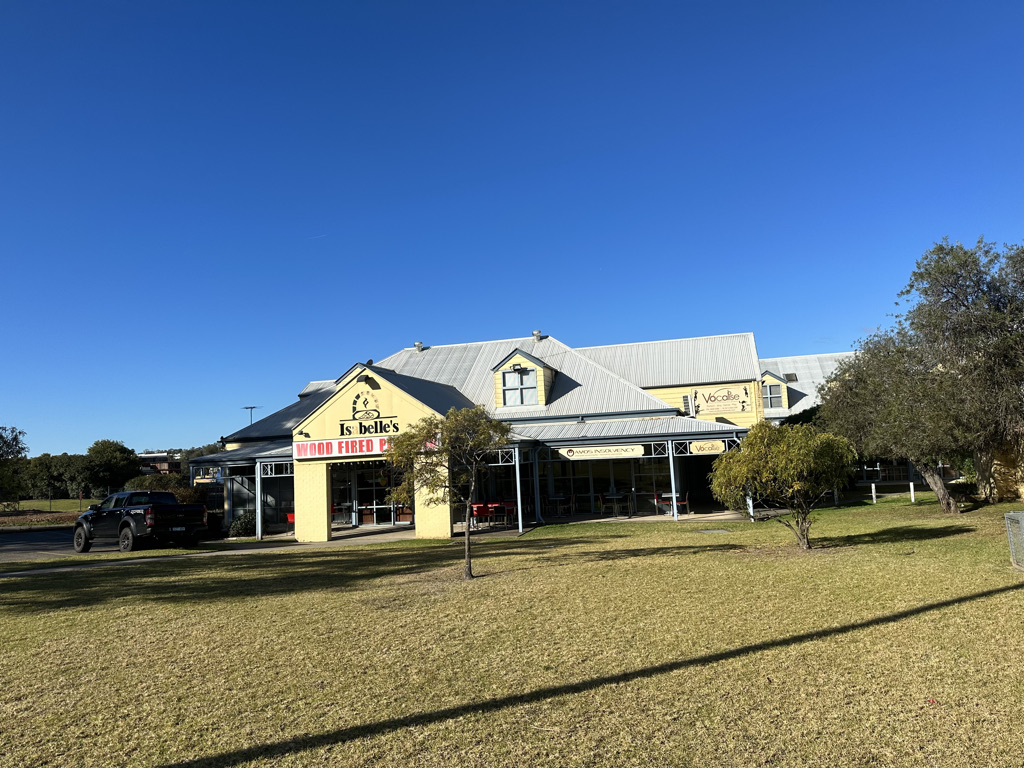
Write a caption here

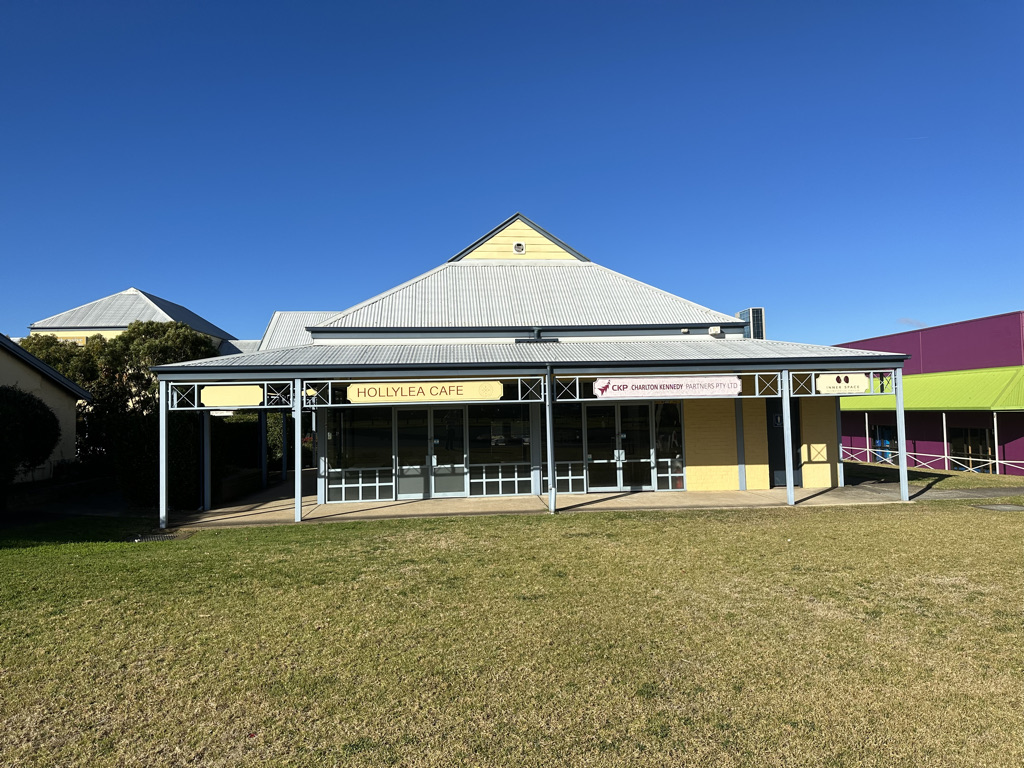
Write a caption here
