= Campbelltown Sports Stadium =

Stadium in Leumeah, New South Wales, Australia

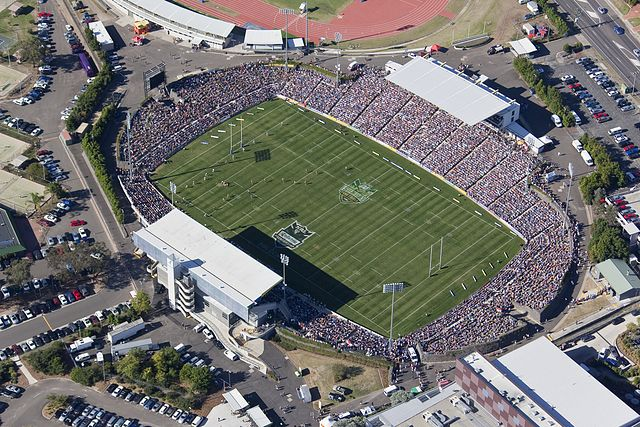
- Interactive map of Campbelltown Sports Stadium
- Former names: Orana Park, Campbelltown Sports Ground
- Location: Old Leumeah Rd, Leumeah, New South Wales 2560
- Coordinates: 34°3′1″S 150°50′1″E
- Owner: Campbelltown City Council
- Operator: Campbelltown City Council
- Capacity: 17,500
- Surface: Grass
- Record attendance: 20,527 (Wests Tigers vs North Queensland Cowboys, 14 August 2005)
- Public transit: Leumeah

Construction
- Opened: 1955

Tenants
- East Campbelltown Eagles (1961–1968); Newtown Jets (1983); Western Suburbs Magpies (1987–present); Wests Tigers (NRL) (2000–present); Macarthur Rams (2008); Western Sydney Wanderers FC (W-League) (2012–2014); Macarthur FC (A-League Men) (2020–present)

Campbelltown Sports Stadium is a multi-purpose stadium in Leumeah, a suburb in the Macarthur region of South Western Sydney, New South Wales, Australia, owned by Campbelltown City Council. Formerly known as Orana Park and Campbelltown Sports Ground, it is currently the home ground of the Western Suburbs Magpies, Wests Tigers and Macarthur Bulls FC. The stadium has a nominal capacity of 17,500, with a recorded highest crowd figure of 20,527 for a game between Wests Tigers and North Queensland Cowboys in the 2005 NRL season. It is located adjacent to Leumeah railway station and Wests Leagues Club.

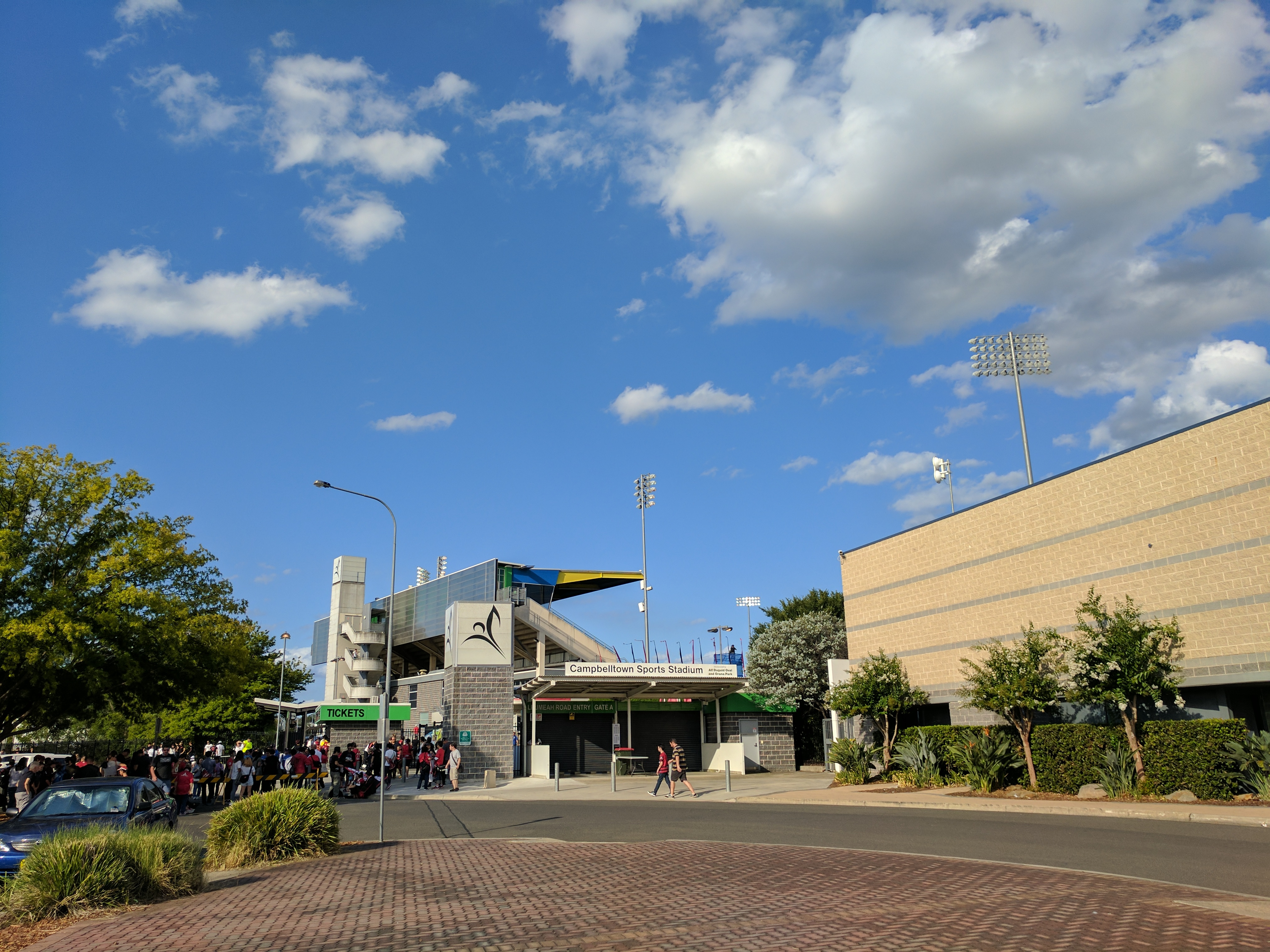
Campbelltown Stadium entrance

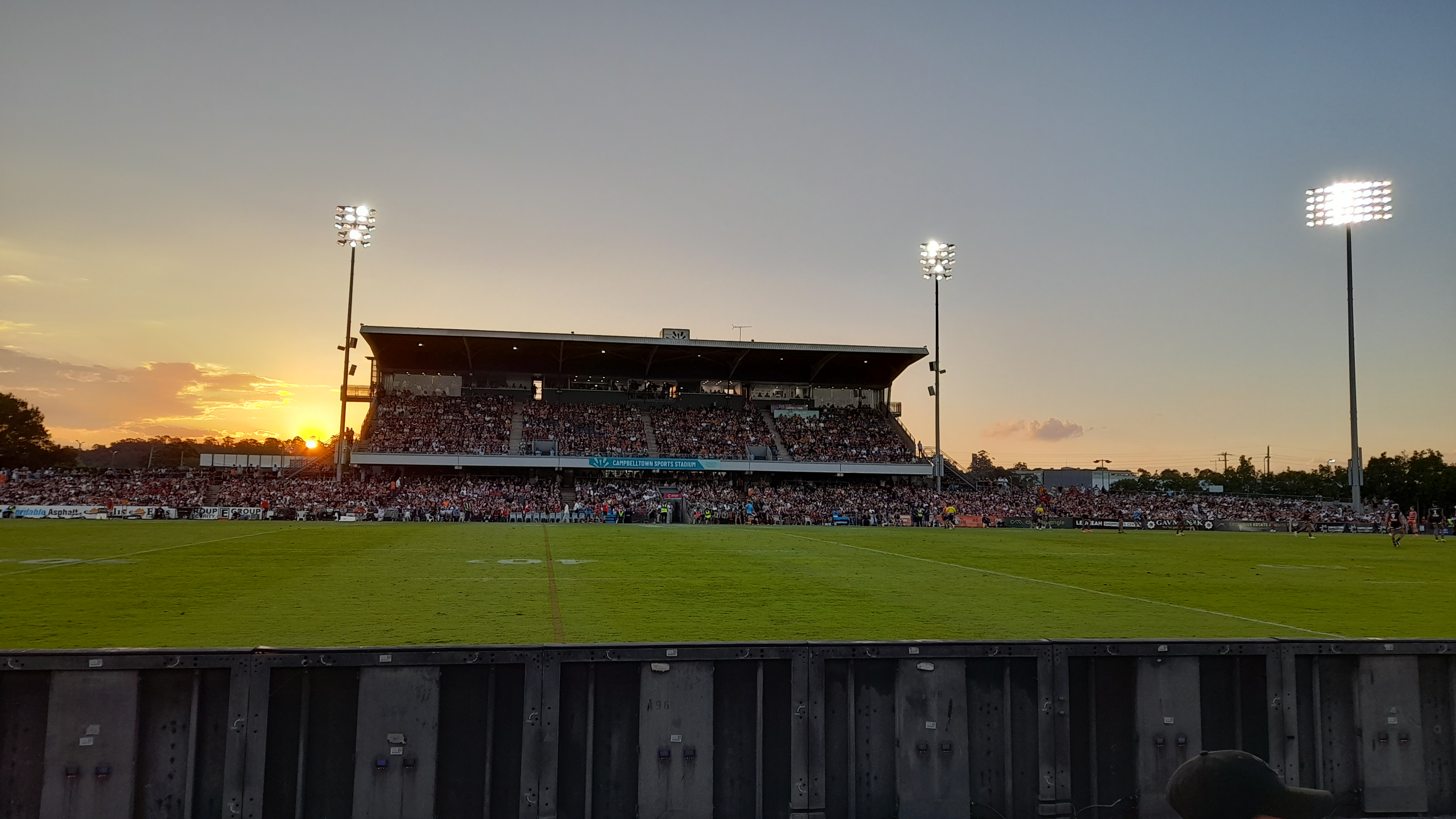
The Western Stand at sunset during the Wests Tigers vs St George Illawarra Dragons match in April 2024

== Stadium usage ==
=== Rugby league ===
In the National Rugby League, the stadium was home to the Western Suburbs Magpies club from 1987 until 1999 and was one of the home grounds for the Newtown Jets in 1983. The Magpies had merged with the Balmain Tigers for the 2000 season to form the Wests Tigers, and thus, since 2000, this ground is being used on an occasional basis by the Wests Tigers, with four of their twelve annual home games played there, in accordance with their stadium deals. The Western Suburbs Magpies junior teams and Ron Massey Cup side also play most of their home games at Campbelltown.

The record crowd for the ground for a rugby league match has been 20,527 between the Wests Tigers and the North Queensland Cowboys on 14 August 2005. The record crowd for Campbelltown in its previous oval configuration was 17,286 between Western Suburbs and St George on 2 August 1991. The record crowd for Newtown at the stadium is 10,686 against rival Parramatta in 1983.

List of rugby league senior international matches played at Campbelltown Stadium.

Test#	Date	Result	Attendance	Notes
1	7 October 2005	Tonga def. Samoa 34–20	2,500	
2	29 September 2006	Samoa def. Fiji 30–28	3,113	2008 Rugby League World Cup qualifying
3	29 September 2006	Tonga def. Cook Islands 56–14	3,113	2008 Rugby League World Cup qualifying
4	17 October 2015	Tonga def. Cook Islands 28–8	4,813	2017 Rugby League World Cup qualifier
5	6 May 2017	Papua New Guinea def. Cook Islands 32–22	18,271	2017 Pacific Tests
6	6 May 2017	Tonga def. Fiji 26–24	18,271	2017 Pacific Tests
7	6 May 2017	England def. Samoa 30–10	18,271	2017 Pacific Tests
8	23 June 2018	Papua New Guinea def. Fiji 26–14	17,802	2018 Pacific Tests
9	23 June 2018	Tonga def. Samoa 38–22	17,802	2018 Pacific Tests
10	25 June 2022	Samoa def. Cook Islands 42–12	10,515	2022 Pacific Tests
11	25 June 2022	Papua New Guinea def. Fiji 24–14	10,720	2022 Pacific Tests

=== Association football ===
On 19 July 2008, Australian A-League Men team Sydney FC played their first Pre-Season Cup match against Brisbane Roar. Sydney won the match 2–1 in front of roughly 4,500 fans. Sydney FC also played a pre-season friendly here in preparation for their 2010–11 A-League season against local club Macarthur Rams in which Sydney won 1–0.

Sydney FC played their first premiership match for A-League points at Campbelltown Stadium against Perth Glory on 18 January 2012 (originally to be played on 7 December 2011). The game ended up in a 1–1 draw and drew 5,505 fans.

The stadium was host for the local Macarthur Football Association Premier League finals in September 2012.

Western Sydney Wanderers FC defeated Newcastle Jets FC 2–1 in a 2012–13 season Regional Round match at the venue. The game was attended by 10,589 fans. The Wanderers would return to the stadium against the same opposition in the 2016–17 season during the redevelopment of Parramatta Stadium. In 2016, Western Sydney Wanderers FC announced that the club would be playing all their 2017 AFC Champions League games at Campbelltown Stadium.

In the 2018–19 A-League season, the stadium played host to a match between Wellington Phoenix FC and Sydney FC in front of 5,115 people. Sydney FC won 1–0.

The stadium also hosted a 2019 FFA Cup match between Sydney United 58 and Western Sydney Wanderers in which the Wanderers won 7–1 in front of 5,061 people.

In February 2020, the stadium played host to five matches in the 2020 AFC Women's Olympic Qualifying Tournament.

From the 2020–21 A-League season, Macarthur FC were formed and play their home games at the ground.

In July 2023 the venue hosted Korea Republic as their training facility during the 2023 FIFA Women's World Cup.

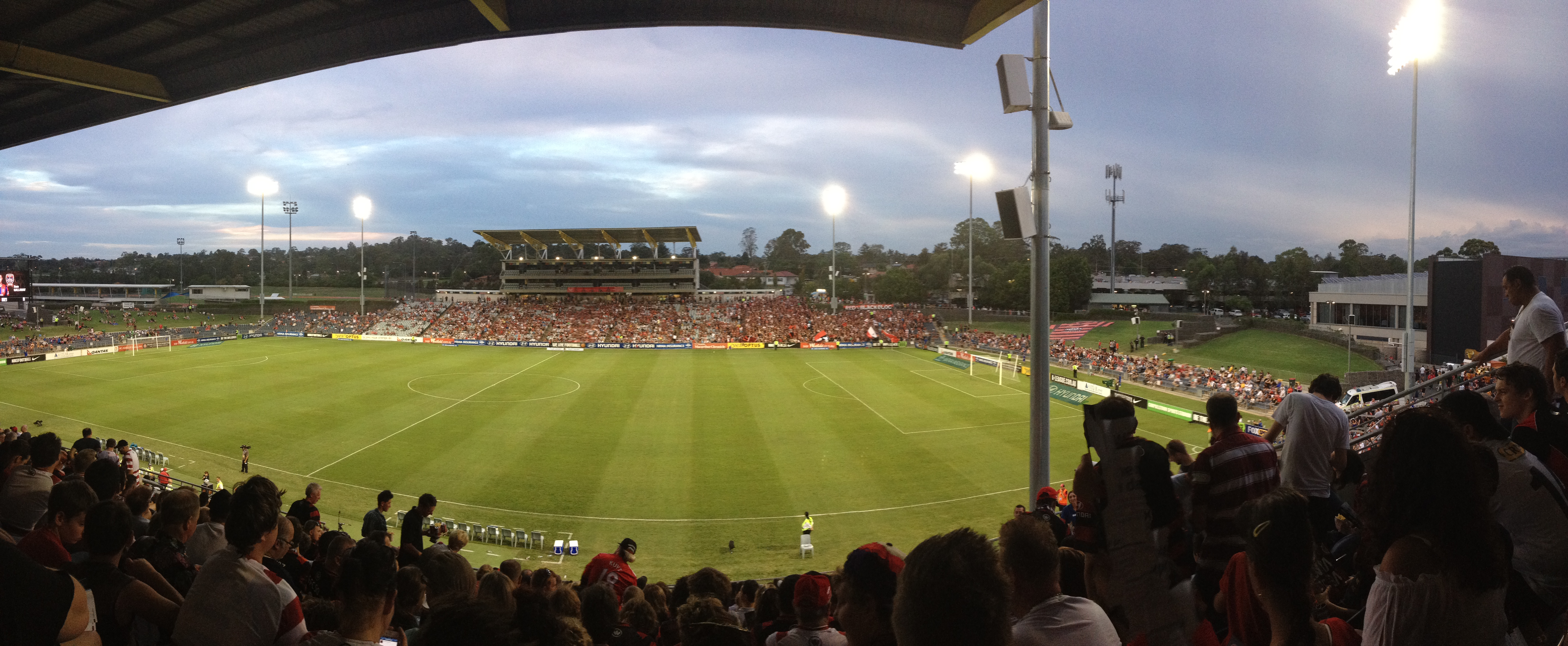
Panorama of Campbelltown Stadium prior to Western Sydney Wanderers defeating Newcastle Jets 2–1 in the 2012–13 A-League season
