= Leumeah High School =

Location
- Junction Road, Leumeah; Sydney, New South Wales; Australia; 34°03′14″S 150°50′50″E

Information
- Type: Public high school
- Motto: Strive to Succeed
- Established: 1977; 49 years ago
- School district: St Andrews; Regional South
- Educational authority: New South Wales Department of Education
- Principal: Christina Mateus
- Years: 7–12
- Enrolment: 768 (2018)
- Campus type: Suburban
- Colours: Bottle green and yellow
- Newspaper: The Link
- Website: https://leumeah-h.schools.nsw.gov.au/

Leumeah High School is a government-funded co-educational comprehensive secondary day school, located in Leumeah, a south-western suburb of Sydney, New South Wales, Australia.

Established in 1977, the school caters for approximately 750 students from Year 7 to Year 12. The school is operated by the New South Wales Department of Education; the principal of the establishment is Christina Mateus.

== See also ==
- List of government schools in New South Wales
- Education in Australia
