= Leumeah =

- Suburb
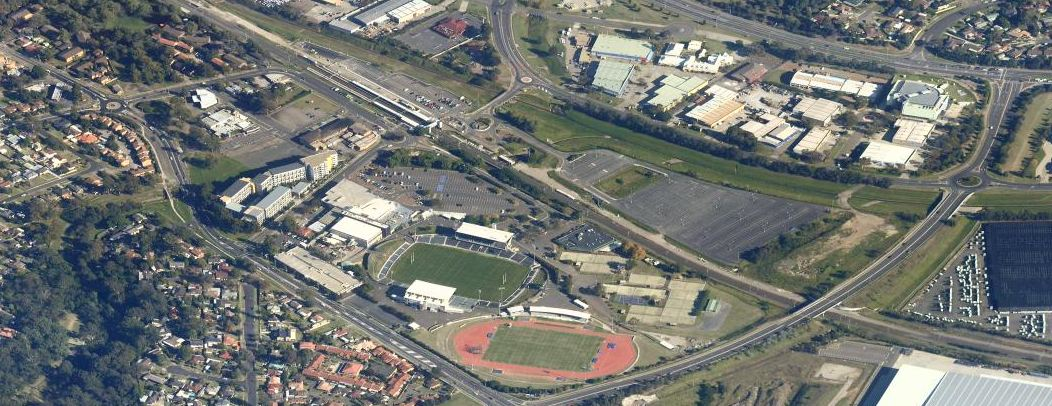
- Aerial image of Leumeah; the railway station is on the top left corner; Campbelltown Stadium is towards the right and Mosaic Buildings on the left

- Interactive map of Leumeah
- Country: Australia
- State: New South Wales
- City: Sydney
- LGA: Campbelltown
- Location: 52 km (32 mi) south-west of Sydney
- Established: 1887

Government
  - State electorates: Macquarie Fields; Campbelltown
  - Federal division: Macarthur, Werriwa
- Elevation: 59 m (194 ft)

Population
  - Total: 9,992 (2021 census)
- Postcode: 2560
Suburbs around Leumeah
Woodbine	Minto	Minto Heights
Woodbine	Leumeah	Kentlyn
Campbelltown	Campbelltown	Ruse

Leumeah (/luːmiːɑː/) is a suburb of Sydney, in the state of New South Wales, Australia 52 kilometres south-west of the Sydney central business district, in the local government area of the City of Campbelltown. It is north of the suburb of Campbelltown and is part of the Macarthur region.

== History ==
The name Leumeah recognises both early settler John Warby, who called his farm Leumeah, and the Tharawal people who originally inhabited the area. It means "Here I rest" and comes from the Tharawal language. Clans of the Tharawal roamed over a wide area from Botany Bay to the Shoalhaven River and inland to Campbelltown. They lived a nomadic hunter-gatherer lifestyle, eating local foods (bush tucker) such as kangaroo, fish, yams and berries. They made tools out of stones, bones and shells to help them build bark shelters, canoes and possum-skin clothing.

John Warby was a convict explorer transported to Sydney on the Pitt in February 1792. In 1802, he was given the job of protecting the cattle roaming free in the Cowpastures area, as the area south west of Sydney was then known. He befriended the Tharawals and learnt some of their language. In 1816, he was granted 260 acres (1.1 km^{2}) at what is now Leumeah where he built his house, a barn and stables. The barn still stands as part of the Colonial Motor Inn.

In 1887, a railway station was built in the area. Originally, it was named Holly Lea after the property of a local politician but local opposition swiftly got the name changed to Leumeah. In 1926, a substantial amount of land was released as a sub-division although the Great Depression deferred substantial growth in the area until after World War II. Subdivision continued throughout the 1950s and 1960s and in 1969, the suburb was formally named Leumeah.

The first Campbelltown North Post Office opened on 16 September 1960 and was renamed Leumeah from 1961.

The streets of Leumeah are named after famous dams, lakes of NSW, explorers and pioneer farmers. Continuing the theme from the suburb's own naming, Campbelltown Stadium, home of Macarthur FC, was originally called Orana Park after an aboriginal word for "welcome".

== Heritage listings ==
Leumeah has a number of heritage-listed sites, including:

- Holly Lea Road: Holly Lea and Plough Inn

== Commercial area ==
Leumeah Shopping Centre has an IGA supermarket, Australia Post and many local shops within walking distance of Leumeah Train Station, which is located on O'Sullivan Road. Wests Leagues Club is on Old Leumeah Road. Local shops are also located on Parkhill Crescent.

== Transport ==
Leumeah railway station is on the Main Southern railway line.

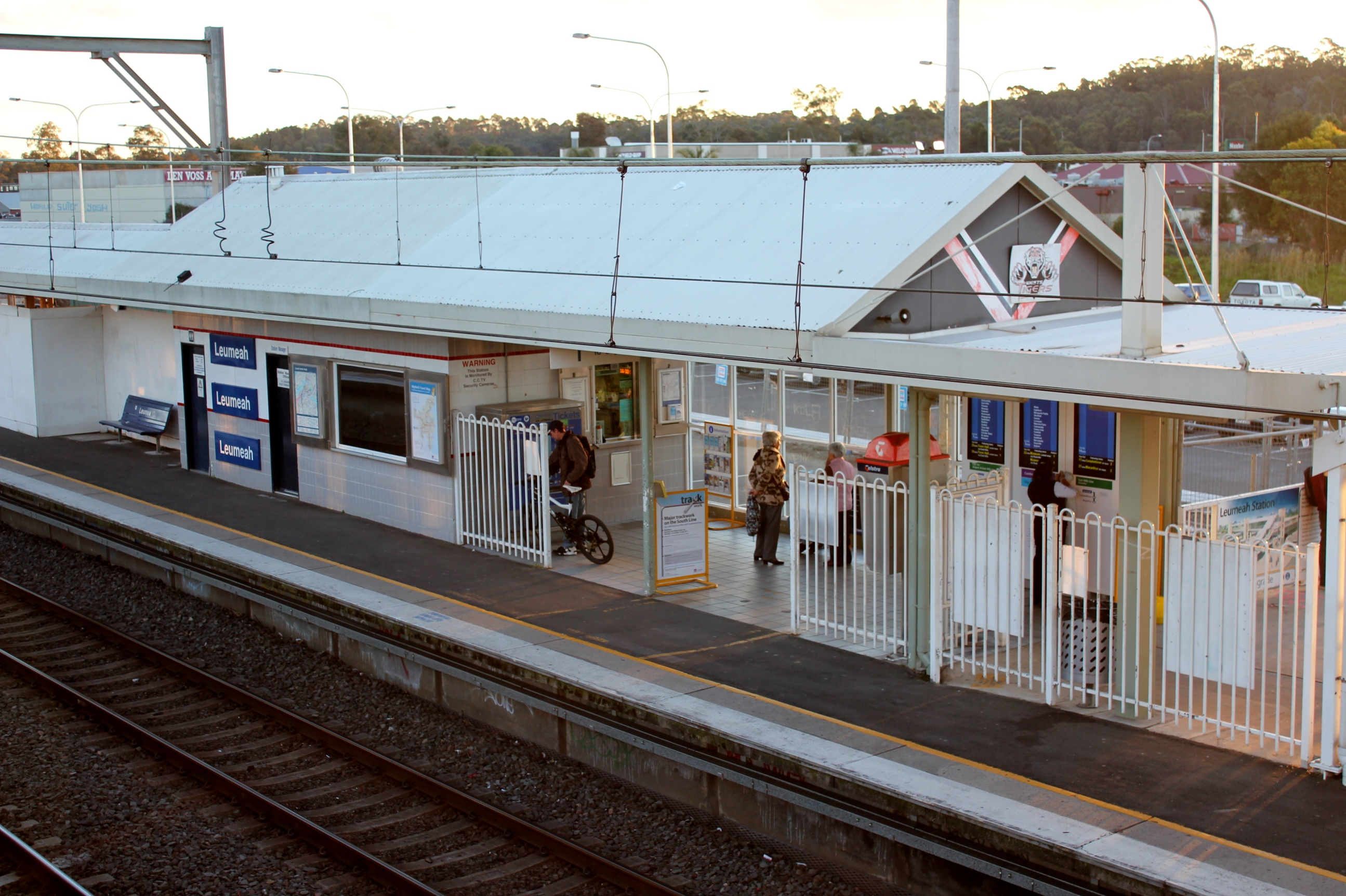
Leumeah railway station platform 1 entrance area.

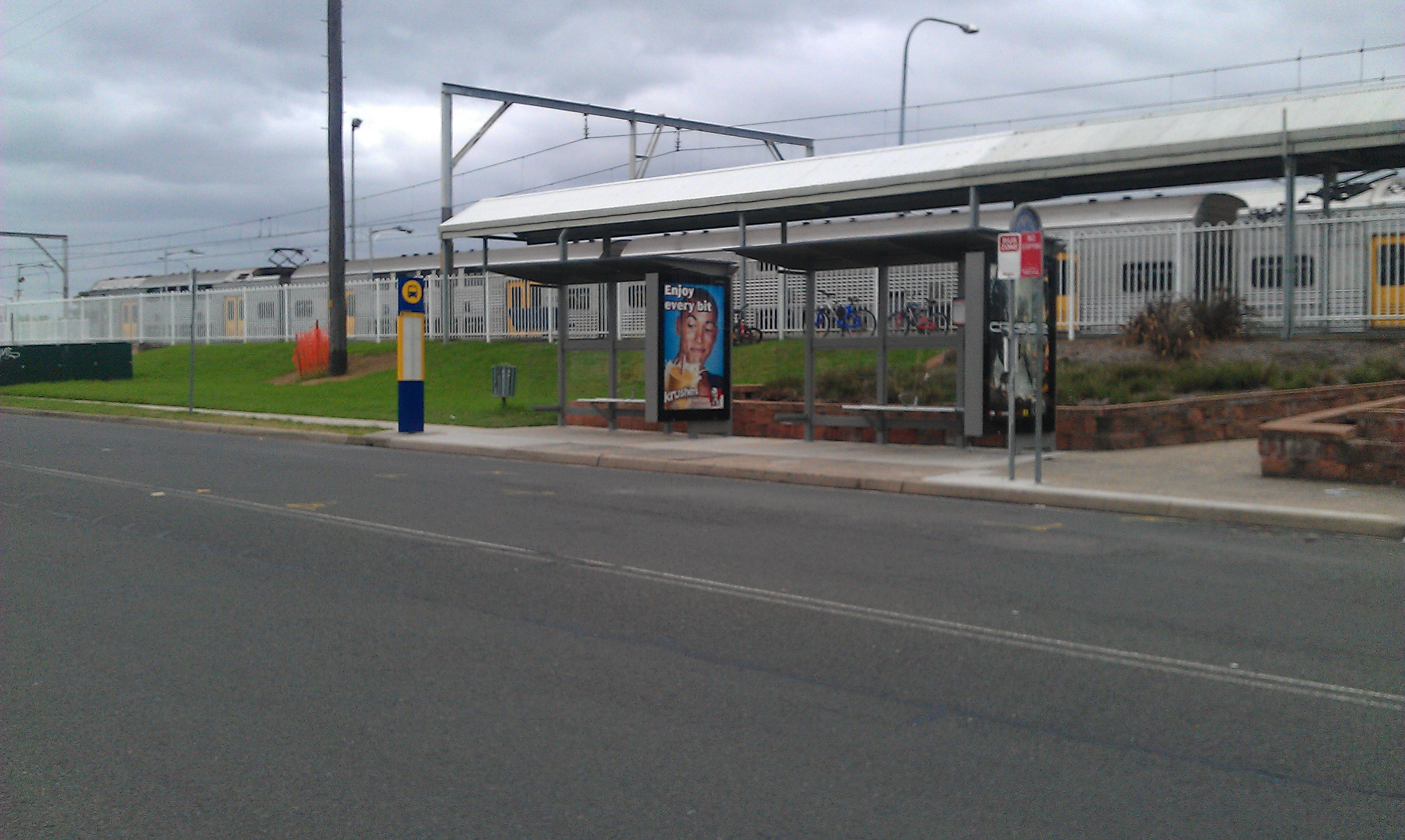
Bus stop on the eastern side of the railway station

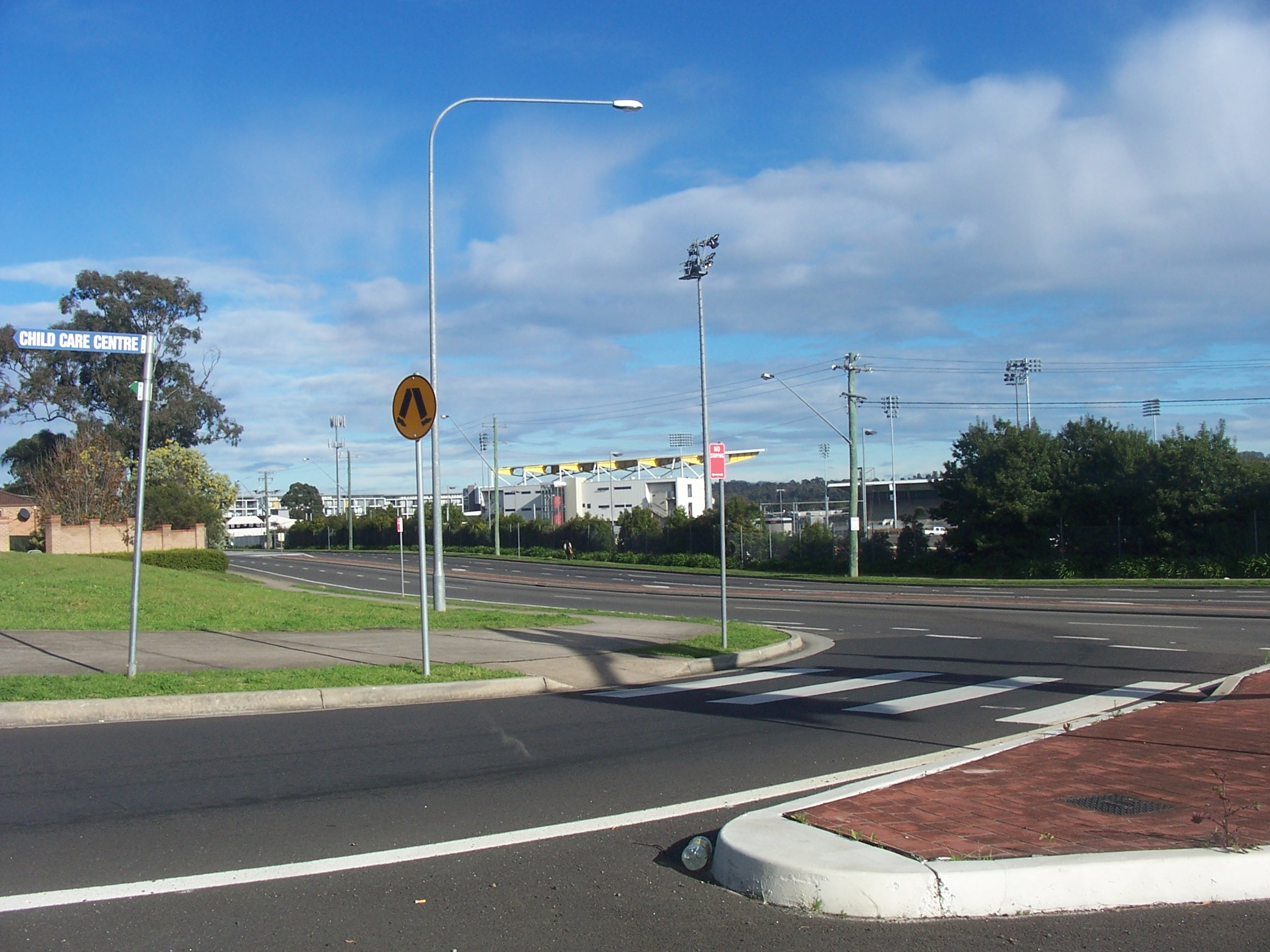
Pembroke Road, Leumeah's main road leading north to Minto and south to Campbelltown

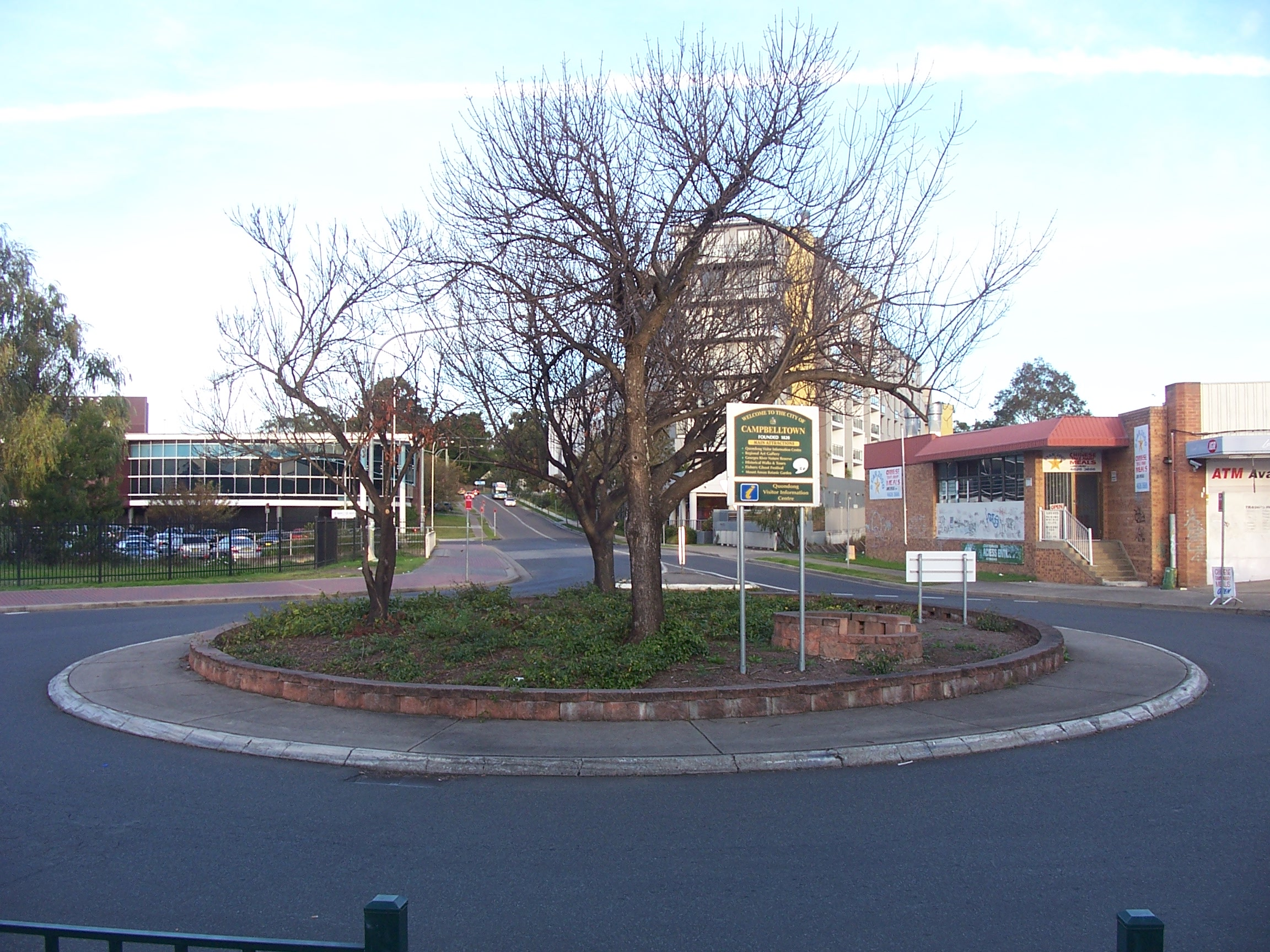
Leumeah Roundabout on Old Leumeah Road outside the railway station

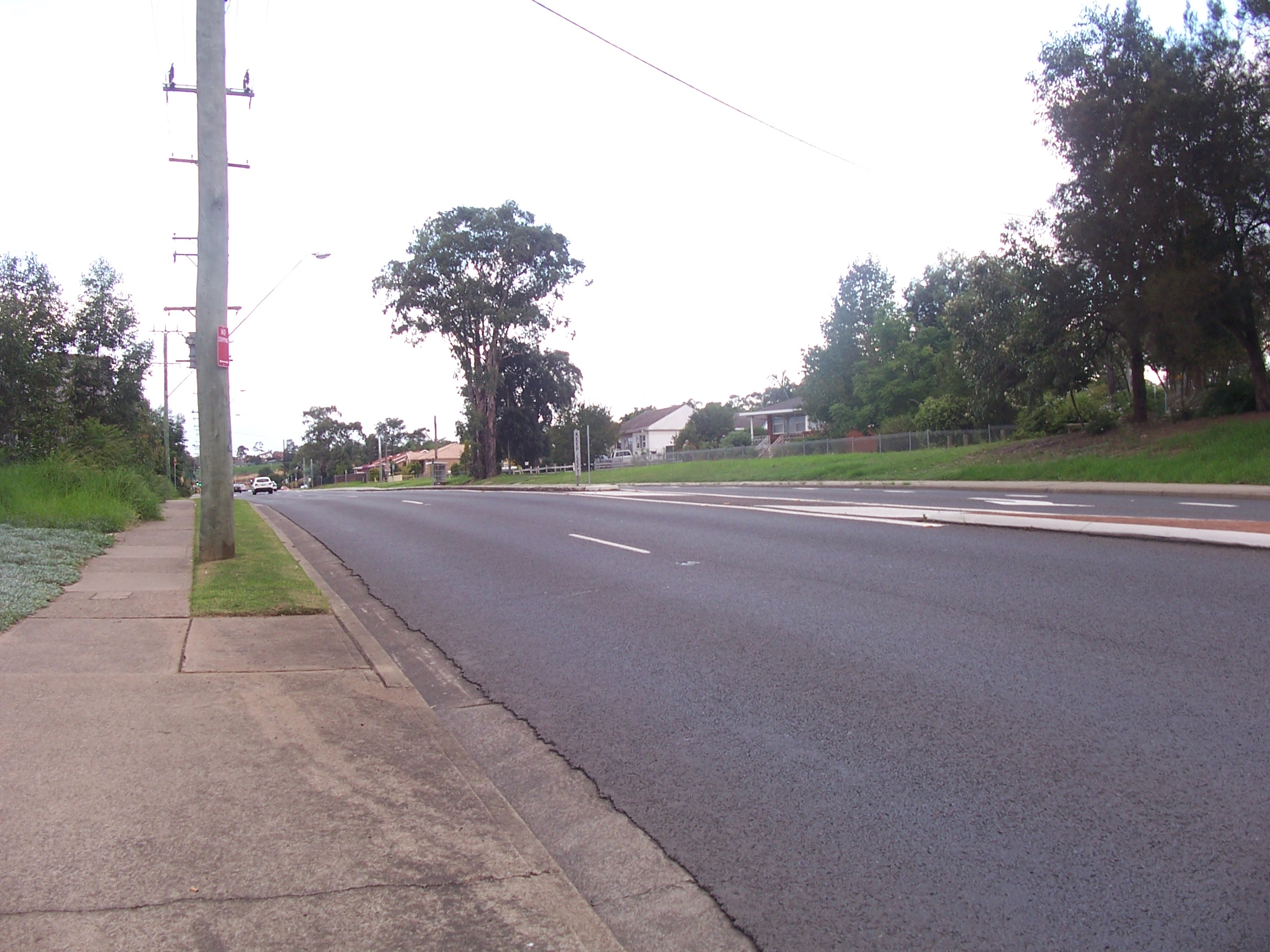
Pembroke Road as viewed from eastern section of Rose Payten Drive

== Schools ==
- Leumeah Public School
- Leumeah High School

== Population ==
In the 2021 census, Leumeah had a population of 9,992 people. 61.8% of people were born in Australia. The next most common countries of birth were Philippines 3.1%, England 2.7%, Nepal 2.7%, India 2.7% and New Zealand 2.5%. 62.9% of people spoke only English at home. Other languages spoken at home included Bengali 3.3%, Nepali 3.2%, Arabic 2.9%, Samoan 2.2% and Tagalog 1.6%. The most common responses for religion were No Religion 25.0%, Catholic 21.4%, Anglican 12.8%, Islam 8.6% and Not stated 7.3%.

== Sport ==
Campbelltown Stadium (formerly known as Orana Park & before that Alfred Duguid Oval) in Leumeah is the home ground of Macarthur Football Club.

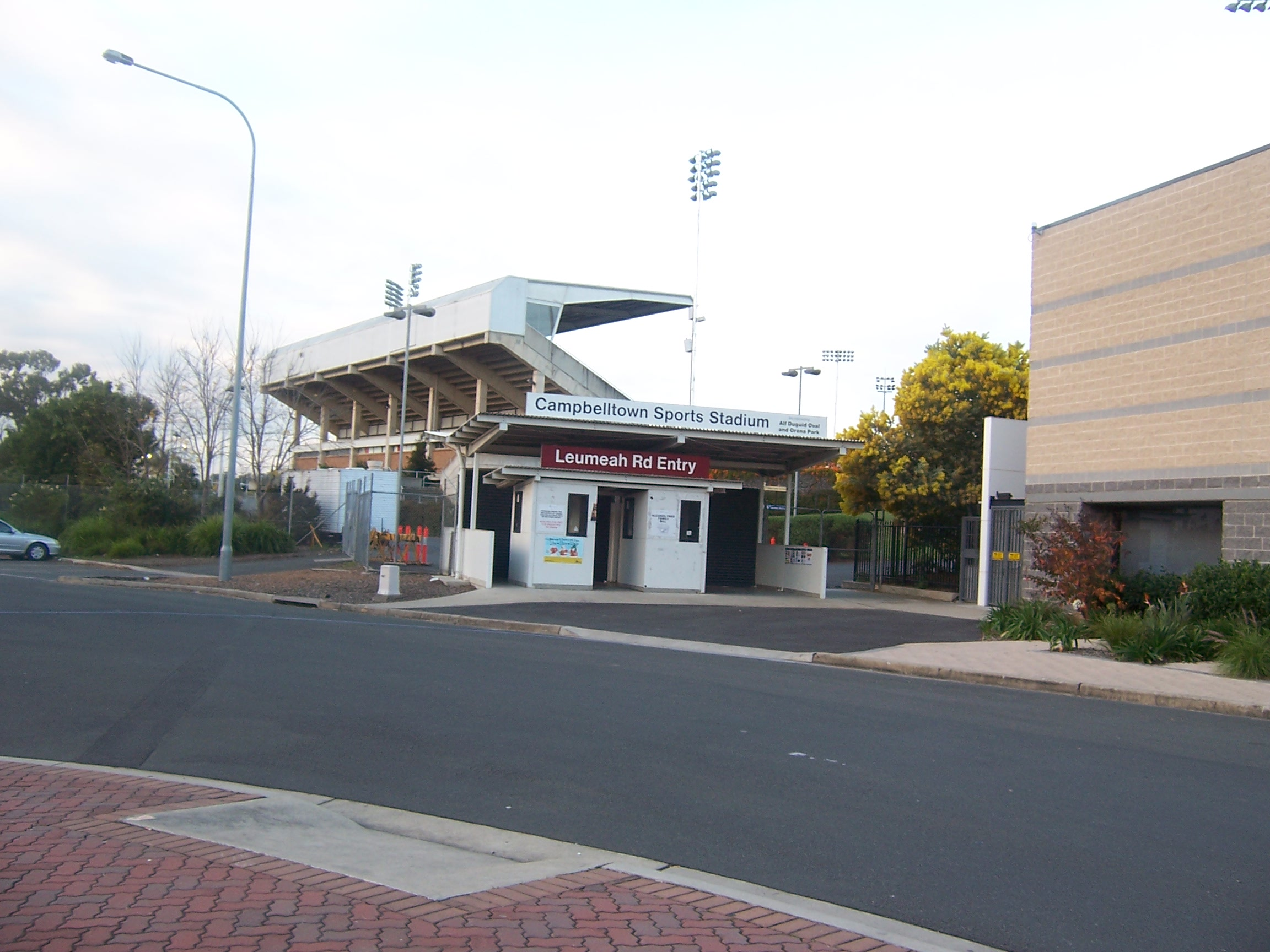
Entrance to Campbelltown Stadium

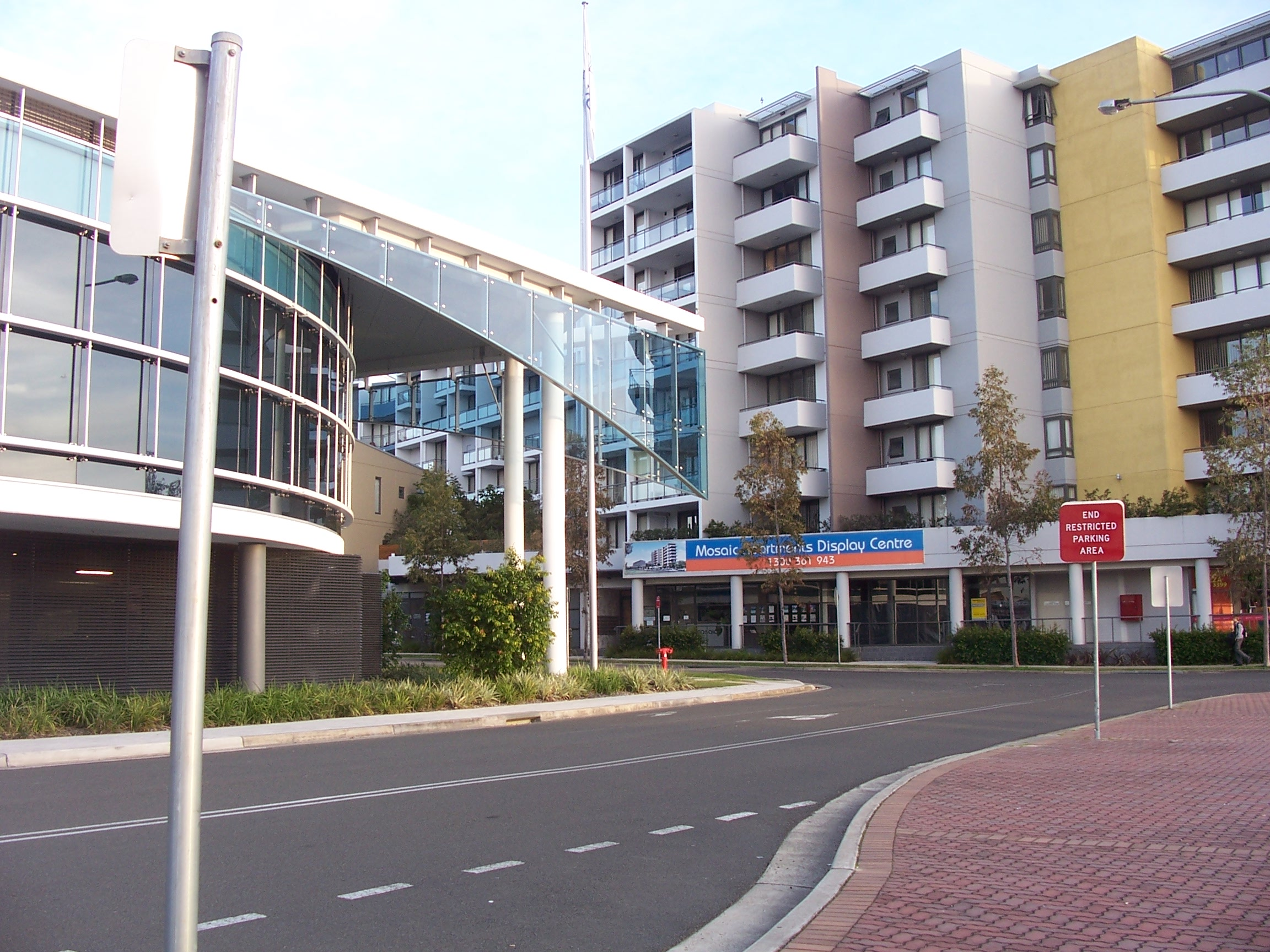
Wests Club, Mosaic Apartments in the background

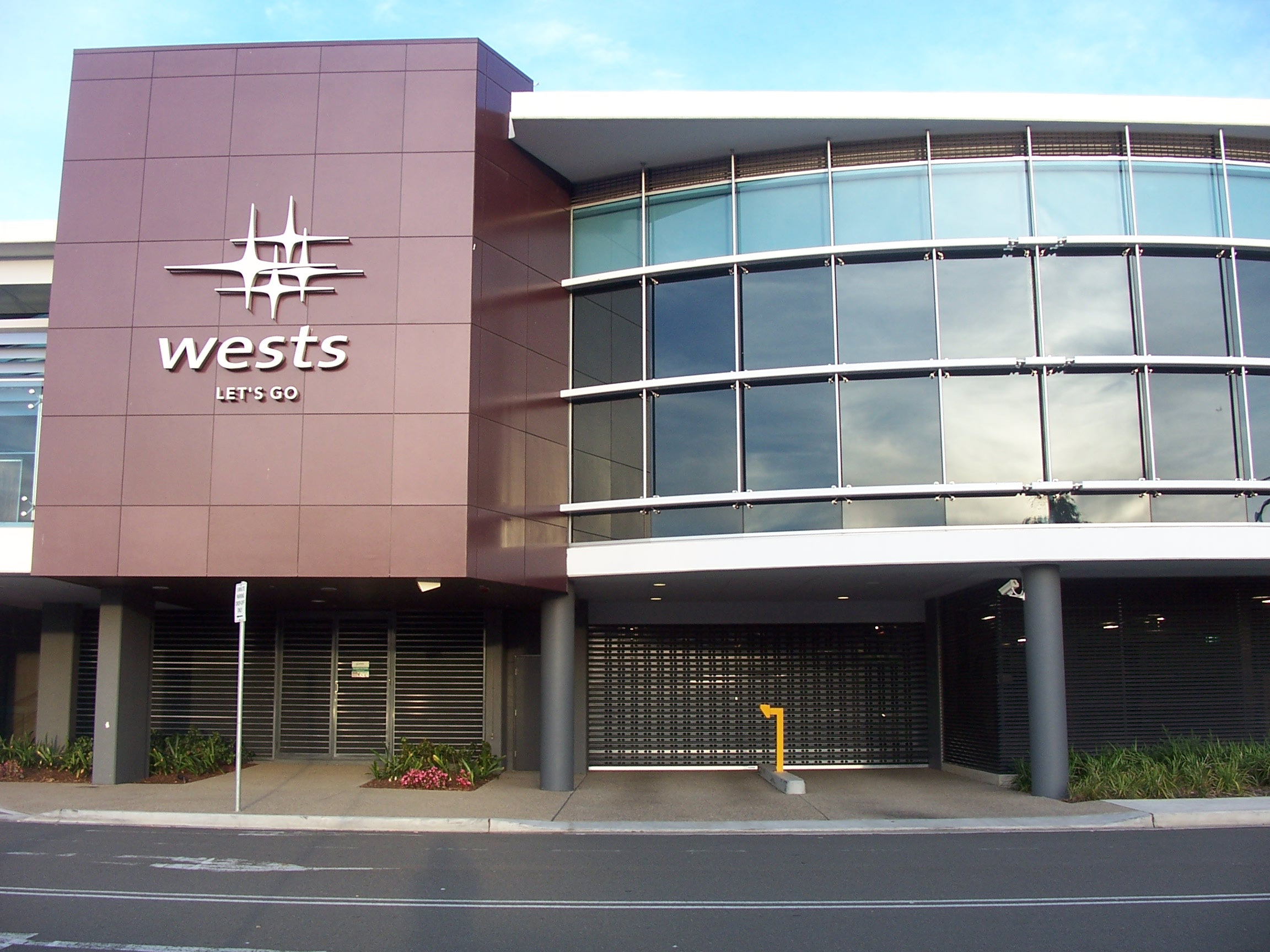
Wests Club Entrance

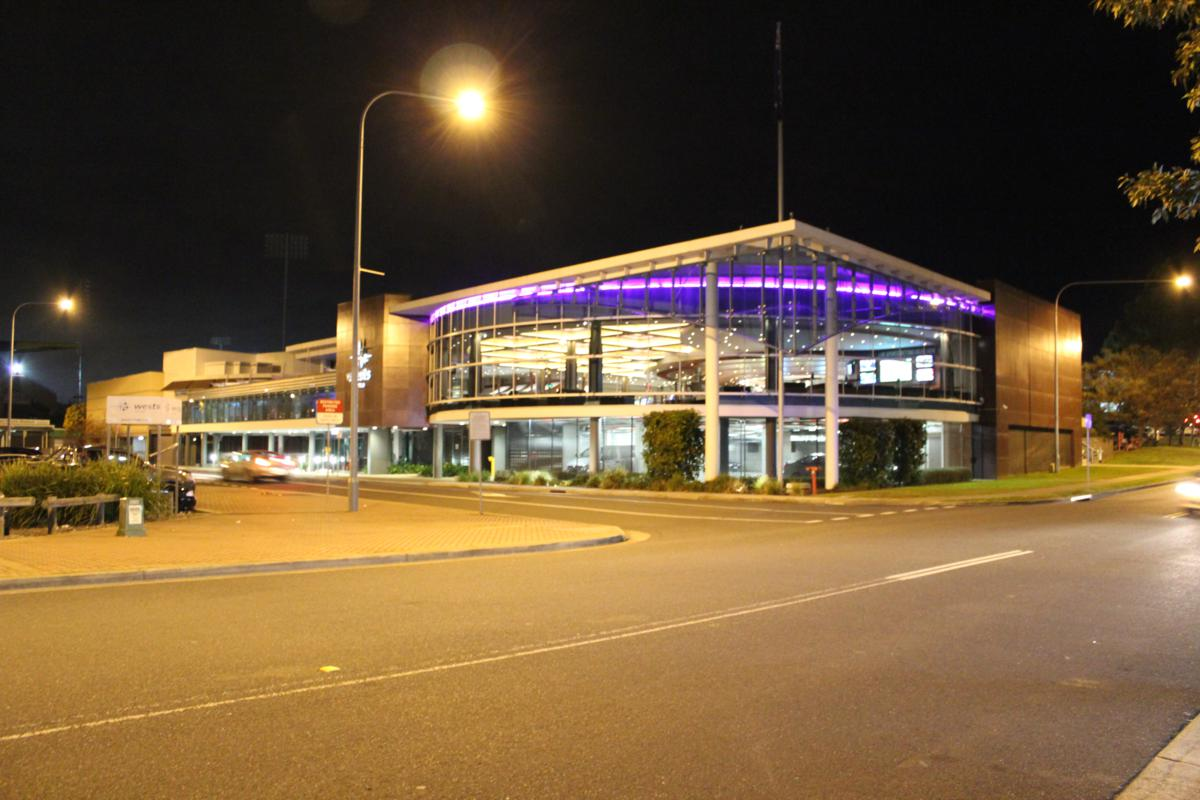
Wests Club at night

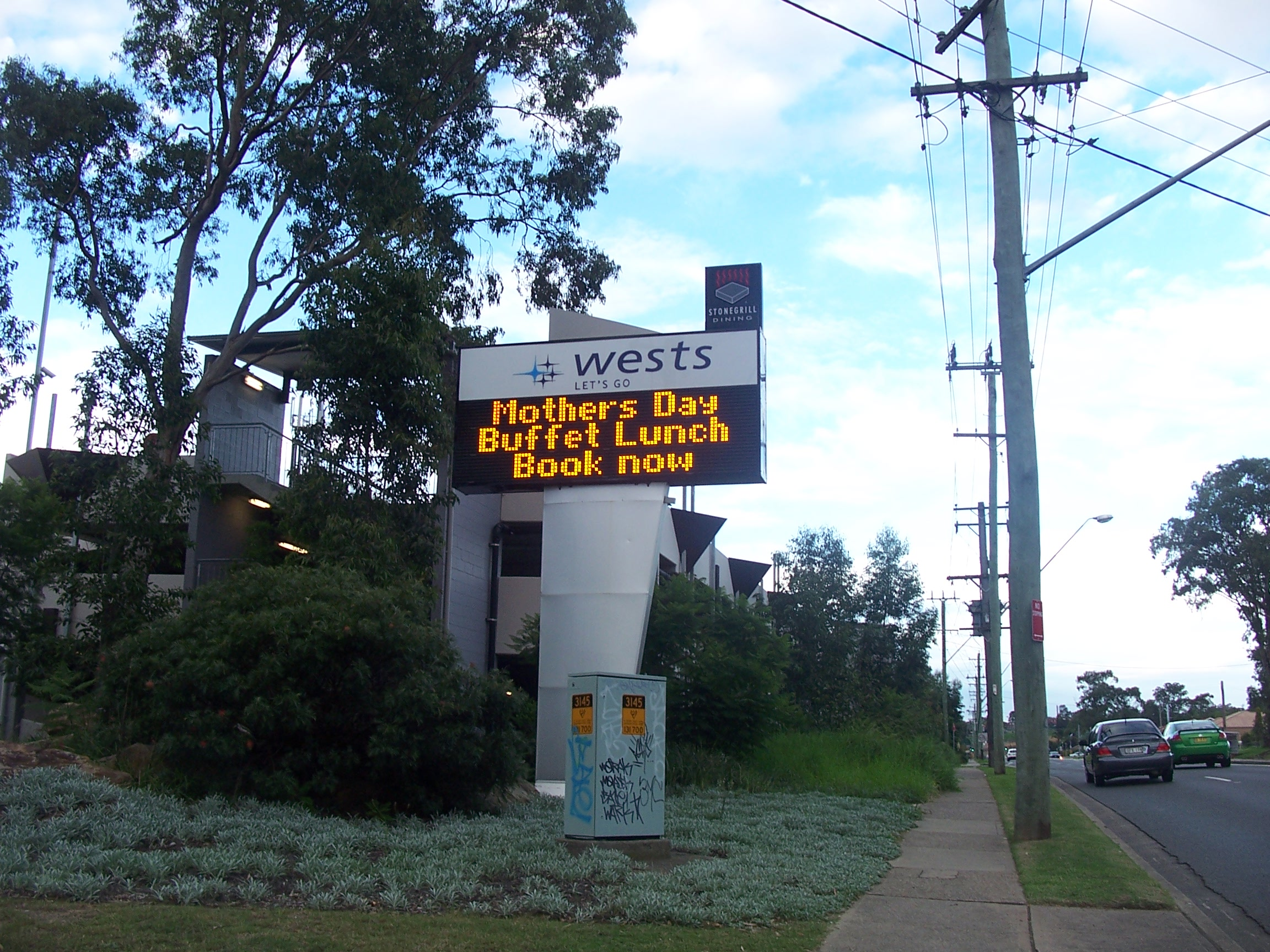
Wests Club Electronic Notice Board
