= Rail Infrastructure Corporation =

Former Australian state government agency

Rail Infrastructure Corporation, later known as Country Rail Infrastructure Authority after July 2010, was a Government of New South Wales statutory corporation with responsibility for the management of the railway network in rural New South Wales, Australia.

Rail Infrastructure Corporation was accountable to its two voting shareholders, the Treasurer and Minister for Transport.

== History ==
In January 2001, Rail Infrastructure Corporation was formed taking over responsibility for ownership and maintenance of the infrastructure from Rail Access Corporation and Railway Services Authority.

In January 2004, after much criticism and public perceptions of blame shifting between units for operational failings, RailCorp was formed taking over the passenger train operations from the State Rail Authority and responsibility for maintaining the greater metropolitan network from Rail Infrastructure Corporation.

In September 2004, Rail Infrastructure Corporation leased the interstate and Hunter Valley lines to the Government of Australia owned Australian Rail Track Corporation for 60 years. The lines covered by the lease are:

- Main South line between Macarthur and Albury
- North Coast line between Maitland and the Queensland border
- Main North line between Broadmeadow and Werris Creek
- Broken Hill line between Parkes and Broken Hill
- Unanderra to Moss Vale line
- Sandy Hollow to Gulgong line
- Stockinbingal to Parkes line
- Parkes to Narromine line
- Troy Junction to Merrygoen line

Rail Infrastructure Corporation also contracted operational responsibility of the remainder of its country branch lines to the Australian Rail Track Corporation, however from January 2012, this was transferred to the John Holland Group.

In July 2010, Rail Infrastructure Corporation ceased to be a state owned corporation, becoming a statutory corporation renamed the Country Rail Infrastructure Authority. In July 2012 the Country Rail Infrastructure Authority was abolished and its responsibilities transferred to Transport for NSW.
