= RailCorp =

Former New South Wales government agency

Rail Corporation New South Wales

Agency overview
- Formed: 1 January 2004
- Preceding agencies: State Rail Authority; Rail Infrastructure Corporation
- Dissolved: 30 June 2020
- Superseding agency: NSW TrainLink Sydney Trains Transport for NSW Transport Asset Holding Entity
- Jurisdiction: New South Wales
- Headquarters: Sydney
- Minister responsible: Minister for Transport
- Agency executive: Howard Collins, Acting Chief Executive
- Parent agency: Transport for NSW
- Key documents: Transport Administration Act, 1988 (NSW); Rail Safety Act, 2008 (NSW); Passenger Transport Act, 1990 (NSW); State Owned Corporations Act, 1989 (NSW)
- Website: www.transport.nsw.gov.au/railcorp

Rail Corporation New South Wales (RailCorp) was an agency of the Government of New South Wales, Australia, established in 2004 pursuant to the Transport Administration Act 1988. It was a division under the control of Transport for NSW, following the latter's establishment in 2011. On 20 June 2020, RailCorp was disbanded with its functions taken over by Transport Asset Holding Entity.

RailCorp held rail property assets, rolling stock and rail infrastructure in the Sydney metropolitan area and limited country locations in the state, and made those assets available to Sydney Trains and NSW TrainLink for their operations. It also managed the government's contract with the Airport Link Company.

Until 2013, RailCorp also operated passenger train services in New South Wales under the brand CityRail, and maintained rail infrastructure within the New South Wales Metropolitan Rail Area. From July 2013, operation and maintenance functions were transferred to the newly created Sydney Trains and NSW TrainLink agencies, which were also subsidiaries of RailCorp, leaving RailCorp as an asset owner. In July 2017, Sydney Trains and NSW Trains ceased to be subsidiaries of RailCorp and became standalone independent agencies.

== History ==
In January 2004, after much criticism, and public perceptions of blame-shifting between units of the State Rail Authority relating to operational failings, RailCorp was formed, taking over the passenger train operations of CityRail and CountryLink, and assuming responsibility for maintaining the greater metropolitan network from the Rail Infrastructure Corporation. It was established as a non dividend paying statutory corporation.

Initially governed by a Board of Directors as a state-owned corporation, changes to the Transport Administration Act, 1988 (NSW) resulted in RailCorp ceasing to be a state-owned corporation and becoming a NSW statutory authority on 1 January 2009. Further changes to the Transport Administration Act, 1988 (NSW) resulted in abolition of the Board effective 1 July 2010 and the repositioning of RailCorp as an agency of Transport NSW. This was followed by further structural changes under the Transport Legislation Amendment Act 2011, which saw Transport NSW replaced by Transport for NSW, which was established as a controlled entity of the Department of Transport, with Rail Corporation New South Wales a controlled entity of Transport for NSW. RailCorp reported to the Minister for Transport.

=== Restructure ===
In May 2012, the Minister for Transport announced a restructure of RailCorp from July 2013 that would:

- establish Sydney Trains to operate services in the Sydney Metropolitan area bounded by Berowra, Richmond, Emu Plains, Macarthur and Waterfall
- establish NSW TrainLink to operate all other passenger services including those of CountryLink
- transfer capital projects and planning functions to Transport for NSW
- establish Transport Cleaning Services, a specialist division responsible for train cleaning
- establish a customer service division
- reduce RailCorp's function to asset owner
- offer voluntary redundancies to 750 management and support staff

The restructure resulted in Sydney Trains and NSW TrainLink, which were subsidiaries of RailCorp, operating railway passenger services in New South Wales under the Sydney Trains and NSW TrainLink brands. While being subsidiaries of Railcorp, Sydney Trains and NSW Trains were not controlled entities of RailCorp, but were instead controlled by Transport for NSW. CityRail and CountryLink were also abolished. In July 2017, Sydney Trains and NSW Trains ceased to be subsidiaries of RailCorp and became standalone and independent agencies of Transport for NSW.

=== Cessation ===
RailCorp was disbanded and succeeded by the Transport Asset Holding Entity (TAHE) on 1 July 2020. The new entity continued to own assets on behalf of Transport for NSW. The Residual Transport Corporation (RTC), which was formed in July 2017, would then own assets not suitable for TAHE ownership.

== Corruption investigation ==
In 2007 and 2008, RailCorp was investigated by the Independent Commission Against Corruption (ICAC). In a series of seven reports released during 2008, ICAC reported that more than $21 million in improper contracts and deals through the procurement of services in just three years. In June 2009, RailCorp terminated the contract of Vicki Coleman, its chief information officer, and it was claimed that she was at the centre of claims of dishonesty and corruption.

ICAC recommended charges against 33 people; yet by April 2012, only eight people had faced the courts. Those that received custodial sentences included Allan Michael Blackstock (4½ years) and Renea Hughes (3½ years). Youssef (Joe) Madrajat was directed to undertake community service. Further charges are expected to be laid on others, and several are still waiting for the outcome of criminal proceedings.

== Emergency response ==
RailCorp maintained a statewide Emergency Response Unit. The function of this unit was to attend incidents, such as derailments. Formerly known as the State Rail Fire Service, the unit was based in Sydney and responded to emergency incidents involving the rail network including automatic fire alarms within the underground and nearby stations. The unit also undertook cross-training with Fire & Rescue New South Wales. The unit was equipped with a number of vehicles including Mercedes and International pumpers and a specialist rapid rail response unit which was able to travel via the road and rail network for rescue operations. The unit's motto was Semper Paratus, translated from Latin to mean Always Ready.

== See also ==
- Rail transport in New South Wales
- Railways in Sydney
