= Transport Asset Manager of New South Wales =

Australian state-owned corporation

- Logo used until 2024 with its previous name

Agency overview
- Formed: 1 January 2025 (as the Transport Asset Manager); 1 July 2020 (as the Transport Asset Holding Entity of New South Wales)
- Preceding agency: RailCorp
- Jurisdiction: New South Wales
- Headquarters: Sydney
- Agency executive: John Garrad, Chief Executive
- Parent department: Transport for NSW
- Key document: Transport Administration Act, 1988 (NSW)
- Website: tahensw.com.au

The Transport Asset Manager of New South Wales (TAM) is an agency of the Government of New South Wales under the Transport Administration Act 1988.

Like its predecessors RailCorp and the Transport Asset Holding Entity of New South Wales (TAHE), TAM holds rail property assets, rolling stock and rail infrastructure in the Sydney metropolitan area and limited country locations in the state and it makes these assets available to Sydney Trains and NSW TrainLink for their operations. Its asset base consists of "rail embankments, cuttings and tunnels, track, signals, power systems, rolling stock, stations and significant land holdings around stations" across the state.

== History ==
TAM is the continuation of a state-owned corporation known as the Transport Asset Holding Entity of New South Wales (TAHE) which was established by converting and renaming RailCorp on 1 July 2020. During its time as a state-owned corporation, it was not an agency or division of Transport for NSW. Alongside the establishment of TAHE, a sister entity, the Residual Transport Corporation (RTC), was formed in July 2017, owning assets not suitable for TAHE ownership.

The TAHE was planned to eventually own the state's public transport assets, including ferries.

In 2021, TAHE was the subject of an investigation by the NSW Legislative Council public accountability committee. The Financial Review report stated: "Faced with the new accounting standards, PwC ... recommended either the whole TfNSW portfolio be fully corporatised or the TAHE proposal be dropped", noting that currently only 30% of costs were recovered.

Following a change of state government, in September 2023, it was announced that TAHE would become a government agency. Legislation to change the TAHE to an agency and its name was assented in September 2024, and took effect on 1 January 2025.

With the transition of TAHE to TAM, the RTC was also abolished in 2025.

== Governance ==
TAM is currently a non-commercial public non-financial corporation, with similar general functions in legislation as TAHE.

As a statutory state-owned corporation in New South Wales, the TAHE had a board of directors that is made up of the secretary of Transport for NSW and 3 to 7 directors appointed by the voting shareholders. The board of directors ceased on 31 December 2024 on TAHE's last day as a state-owned corporation. In its place, TAM has an advisory board.

The TAM Advisory Board was established in May 2025 and is required to consist of the Secretary of Transport for NSW (who is the Statutory Member) and between 3 to 7 other board members appointed by the Minister for Transport. As at October 2026, the Board consisted of the Secretary and four other board members appointed by the Minister for Transport. Carolyn Walsh is currently the Chairperson.

As a NSW Government agency, TAM and its Chief Executive are subject to the control and direction of the Minister for Transport under the Transport Administration Act.

== Assets and Financials ==
TAM is the legal owner of a portfolio of rail infrastructure, rolling stock and land holdings within metropolitan and regional NSW. Its railway network assets include 1,550 km of metropolitan rail network, 2,500 km of country rail network track (and 3,100 km of non-operational track), 355 stations and 395,000 square metres of commercial gross lettable area. TAM owns a rolling stock consisting of 1,876 operational electric and diesel cars. TAM also owns 302 million square metres of land. Other rail infrastructure assets include station services and facilities, track, turnouts, bridges, tunnels, electrical overhead wiring and structures, substations, signalling equipment, plant and machinery, heavy plant and machinery and earthworks.

TAM's assets do not include those operated by Sydney Metro, as Sydney Metro holds its own property, plant and equipment (including tracks, rolling stock, stations and other rail infrastructure). For example, TAM transferred $406.9 million in assets (comprising the line and associated land) to Sydney Metro during the 2024-25 financial year to reflect the conversion of the line to the Sydney Metro network.

TAM receives revenue from its contracts with operators. This includes for services that it renders and for making its rail network and rolling stock available to private and public operators through access and licence agreements, primarily with Sydney Trains and NSW TrainLink. TAM also receives operating grants from the NSW Government. TAM also leases its properties to tenants under finance and operating leases.

TAM has Project and Property Development; Licence, Agency and Maintenance and Corporate Services agreements with Transport for NSW.

== See also ==
- List of New South Wales government agencies
