= Ingleburn railway station =

Railway station in Sydney, New South Wales, Australia

Ingleburn
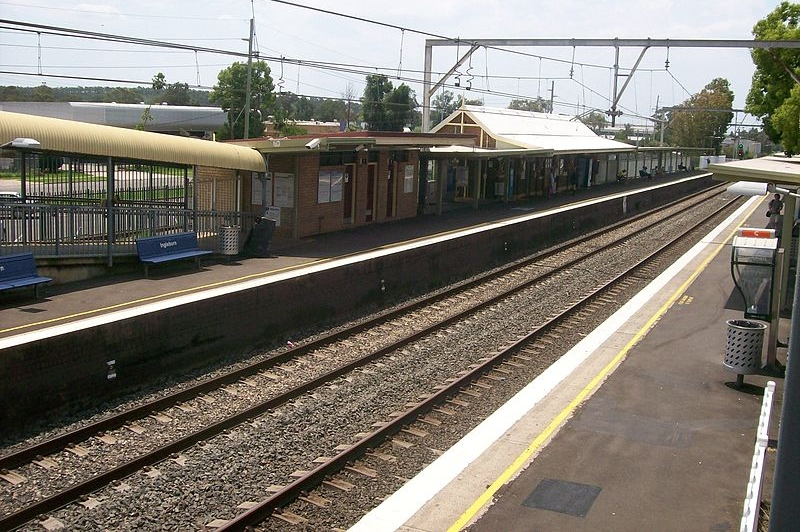
- Northbound view from Platform 2 looking at platform and building, November 2011

General information
- Location: Ingleburn Road, Ingleburn
- Coordinates: 33°59′51″S 150°51′53″E
- Elevation: 32 metres (105 ft)
- Owner: Transport Asset Manager of New South Wales
- Operator: Sydney Trains
- Line: Main Southern
- Distance: 34.0 kilometres (21.1 mi) from Central
- Platforms: 2 side
- Tracks: 3
- Connections: Bus

Construction
- Structure type: Ground
- Accessible: Yes

Other information
- Status: Weekdays: Staffed: 6am to 7pm: Weekends and public holidays: Staffed: 8am to 4pm
- Station code: IGB
- Website: Transport for NSW

History
- Opened: 19 August 1883

Passengers
- 2025: 1,593,862 (year); 4,367 (daily) (Sydney Trains)
- Rank: 89

Services
Preceding station	Sydney Trains	Following station
Minto towards Macarthur	T8 Airport & South Line	Macquarie Fields towards City Circle
Location

Ingleburn railway station is a heritage-listed railway station located on the Main Southern line, serving the Sydney suburb of Ingleburn. It is served by Sydney Trains' T8 Airport & South line services.

== History ==
Ingleburn station opened on 19 August 1883.

An additional track was opened to the west of the station in 1995 as part of the Glenfield - Ingleburn passing loop. This unelectrified track was used by freight and long-distance passenger trains. In December 2012, the track was incorporated into the Southern Sydney Freight Line and became freight only.

In April 2014, a major upgrade commenced. This will include lifts being installed at the south end of the station and a new structure on Platform 1. It was scheduled to be completed in 2016.

Since the second half of 2017, Ingleburn railway station has been served exclusively by the Airport and East Hills line, meaning commuters have to change at Glenfield to travel to either the city via Granville or to Blacktown via the Cumberland Line.

== Platforms and services ==
Platform	Line	Stopping pattern	Notes
1	T8 Airport & South Line	services to Central & the City Circle via the Airport; 6 weekday morning peak services to Central & the City Circle via Sydenham	
2	T8 Airport & South Line	services to Macarthur; 6 weekday evening peak services to Campbelltown	

The crossovers to the south and north of the station can be used to terminate trains if there is an obstruction (e.g. broken down train) ahead. In the early 2000s there were a few trains a day timetabled to terminate at Ingleburn, but these have since disappeared from the timetable. The signals at Ingleburn can be switched between automatic and controlled mode. In automatic mode, the signals will automatically change depending on where trains are detected and the points are locked in the normal position. In controlled mode, the signals and points can be controlled from Campbelltown Signal Box or the Rail Operations Centre at Alexandria.

== Transport links ==
Transit Systems operates six bus routes via Ingleburn station, under contract to Transport for NSW:

- 868: from west side to Edmondson Park station
- 869: to Liverpool station via Edmondson Park station
- 870 Campbelltown Hospital to Liverpool station
- 871: Campbelltown Hospital to Liverpool station
- 872: Campbelltown Hospital to Liverpool station
- 873: to Minto

Ingleburn station is served by one NightRide route:

- N30: Macarthur station to Town Hall station
