= Sambo =

Sambo may refer to:

== Places ==
- Sambo, Angola, a commune in Tchicala Tcholohanga, Huambo Province, Angola
- Sambo Creek, a village in Honduras

== People ==
- Ferdy Sambo (born 1973), former Indonesian police general
- Khem Sambo (1961–2011), Cambodian journalist
- Luís Gomes Sambo, Angolan physician and politician who served as director of the African regional office of the World Health Organization
- Sambo, botanist author abbreviation for Maria Cengia Sambo (1888–1939), Italian lichenologist
- The nickname of Terence McNaughton (1965), Irish hurler
- Namadi Sambo (born 1954), former vice president of Nigeria
- Shurandy Sambo (born 2001), Dutch footballer

== Other uses ==
- Sambo, the title character of the 1899 book The Story of Little Black Sambo by Helen Bannerman
  - Sambo, the title character of the 1935 film Little Black Sambo, based on the 1899 book
- Sambo, song from The Red Moon (Johnson and Cole)
- Sambo (martial art), developed in the Soviet Union
- Sambo (mountain), in the Andes of Peru
- Sambo (racial term), a derogatory term for a person of African origin
  - Zambo, a Spanish term most possibly related to "Sambo"
- Sambo's, a former American restaurant chain
- Sambo's Grave, grave of a slave (died 1736) at Sunderland Point in Lancashire, England
- SS Sambo, a Liberty ship torpedoed and lost in the Gulf of Aden 1943

== See also ==
- Samba, an Afro-Brazilian dancing/music style
- Sambomaster, a Japanese rock band
- Sambu (disambiguation)
- Samboy (disambiguation)
- Shambo a black Friesian bull who lived in the Hindu Skanda Vale Temple near Llanpumsaint in Wales (2001–2007)
- Shambo Shiva Shambo or Sambo Shiva Sambo, a 2010 Telugu film
