= Sam Boyd (disambiguation) =

Sam Boyd (1910–1993) was an American entrepreneur, casino manager and developer.

Sam or Samuel Boyd may also refer to:

- Sam Boyd (American football) (1914–2001), head football coach at Baylor University
- Samuel Boyd (Florida politician) (1847–1942), Florida state legislator
- Samuel Becket Boyd II (1865–1929), chief of the Knoxville, Tennessee, fire department
- Samuel Boyd (Northern Ireland politician) (1886/87–?), member of the Senate of Northern Ireland
- Samuel Leonard Boyd, Australian multiple murderer
- Samuel S. Boyd, attorney and judge in Mississippi

== See also ==
- Sam Boyd Stadium, an American football stadium in Whitney, Nevada
