= Samboy (disambiguation) =

Samboy is an Australian brand of potato chips.

Samboy may also refer to:

== People ==
- Samboy Lim
- Samboy de Leon

== Other uses ==
- Samboy Lim PBA Sportsmanship Award

== See also ==
- Sam Boyd (disambiguation)
- Sambo (disambiguation)
