= South West Rail Link =

Railway line in Sydney, New South Wales, Australia

- New South Wales Metropolitan Rail Area with South West Rail Link shuttle highlighted in pink

Overview
- Owner: Transport Asset Manager of New South Wales
- Termini: Glenfield; Leppington
- Stations: 3

Service
- Services: T2 Inner West & Leppington; T5 Cumberland
- Operator: Sydney Trains

History
- Opened: 8 February 2015

Technical
- Line length: 11.4 km (7.1 mi)
- Track gauge: 1,435 mm (4 ft 8 1/2 in) standard gauge
- Electrification: Overhead 1500 V DC
- Operating speed: 115 km/h (70 mph) (service) 125 km/h (80 mph) (design)

The South West Rail Link is a railway line serving the developing suburbs of south-western Sydney, Australia between Glenfield and Leppington. Services form part of the Sydney Trains suburban rail network. It opened on 8 February 2015.

== Description ==
The line consists of a 11.4 km (7.1 mi) double-track railway, with stations in the suburbs of Leppington and Edmondson Park. The line is the major piece of public transport infrastructure for the Sydney metropolitan area's "South West Growth Centre". It connects with the rest of the Sydney rail network at Glenfield, where services can continue north on the Main South line or east on the East Hills line. Leppington station's four platforms can support frequent terminating services, even after an extension of the line. A train stabling facility to the west of the station further enhances this capability. Development of the project was managed by Transport for NSW and its predecessor, the Transport Construction Authority.

== History ==
=== Conception ===
The South West Rail Link was originally part of the Metropolitan Rail Expansion Program (MREP) proposed by the Carr Government in 2005, along with the North West Rail Link and the CBD rail link. The three projects were to be integrated into a single operational sector, with trains from the south-west running to the north-west via the CBD Link. The other two components of the MREP were cancelled in 2008, but the South West Rail Link remained on the government's agenda. Plans for the North West Rail Link were resurrected in 2011 and the rail link was completed in 2019, forming part of the Sydney Metro network.

In March 2008, the Iemma Government indicated that construction would begin in 2009, with completion scheduled for 2012. By October of that year the government had decided that delivery of the project would be divided into two stages. Stage one would comprise preliminary work around Glenfield station, and stage two would comprise construction of the new line itself, stage two was deferred due to budget cuts. On 14 November 2009, Premier Nathan Rees announced that construction of stage two of the South West Rail Link would begin in mid-2010, with completion scheduled for 2016.

=== Construction ===
==== Stage one ====
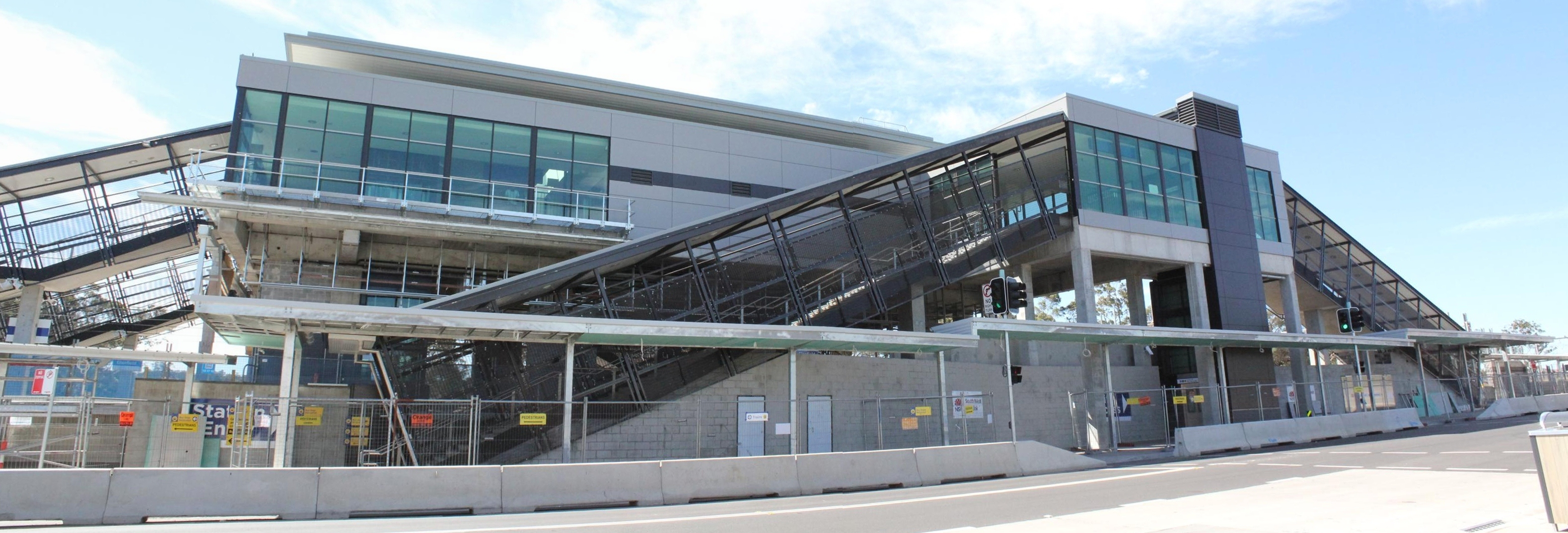
Glenfield station new concourse building in December 2012

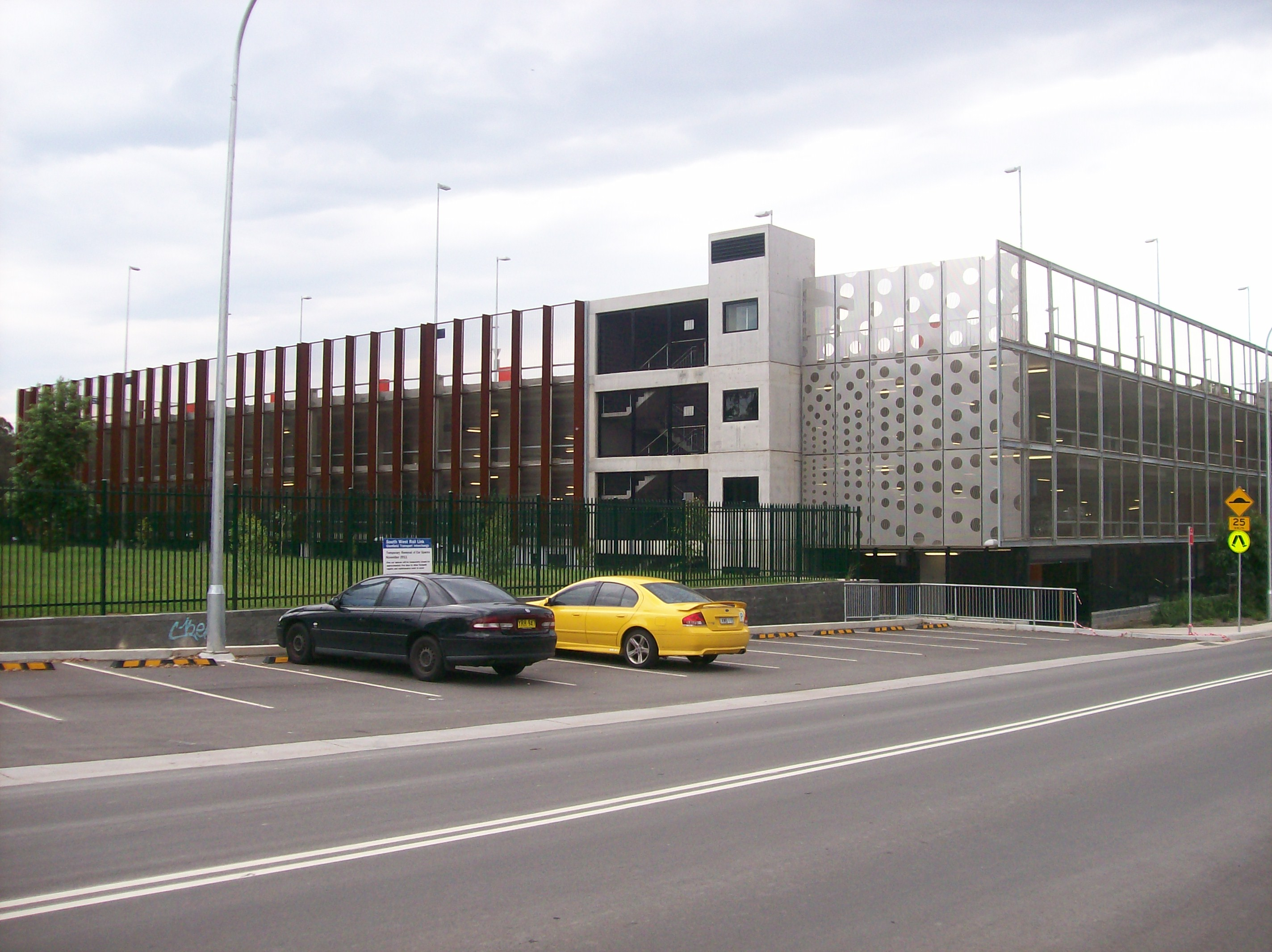
Glenfield station new multi-storey commuter car park in November 2011

Planning approval for stage one of the project was received in April 2009. This stage involves preliminary work to support the new line. It is centred on Glenfield station and includes:

- A ground-level car park at Seddon Park on the eastern side of the station. Construction commenced in May 2009 and was completed in October 2009.
- A multi-storey car park on the western side of the station. Construction commenced in November 2009 and was completed in September 2010.
- The northern rail flyover. This replaced a flat junction between the Main South Line and the East Hills Line with a grade-separated junction. Construction commenced in June 2010 and was completed in June 2014.
- An upgrade of Glenfield station including a new overhead concourse to replace a footbridge, construction of a fourth platform and a bus interchange. As part of this work, the existing platform 1 changed from a side turnback to a through platform. Construction commenced in late 2010 and was completed in mid-2014.

==== Stage two ====
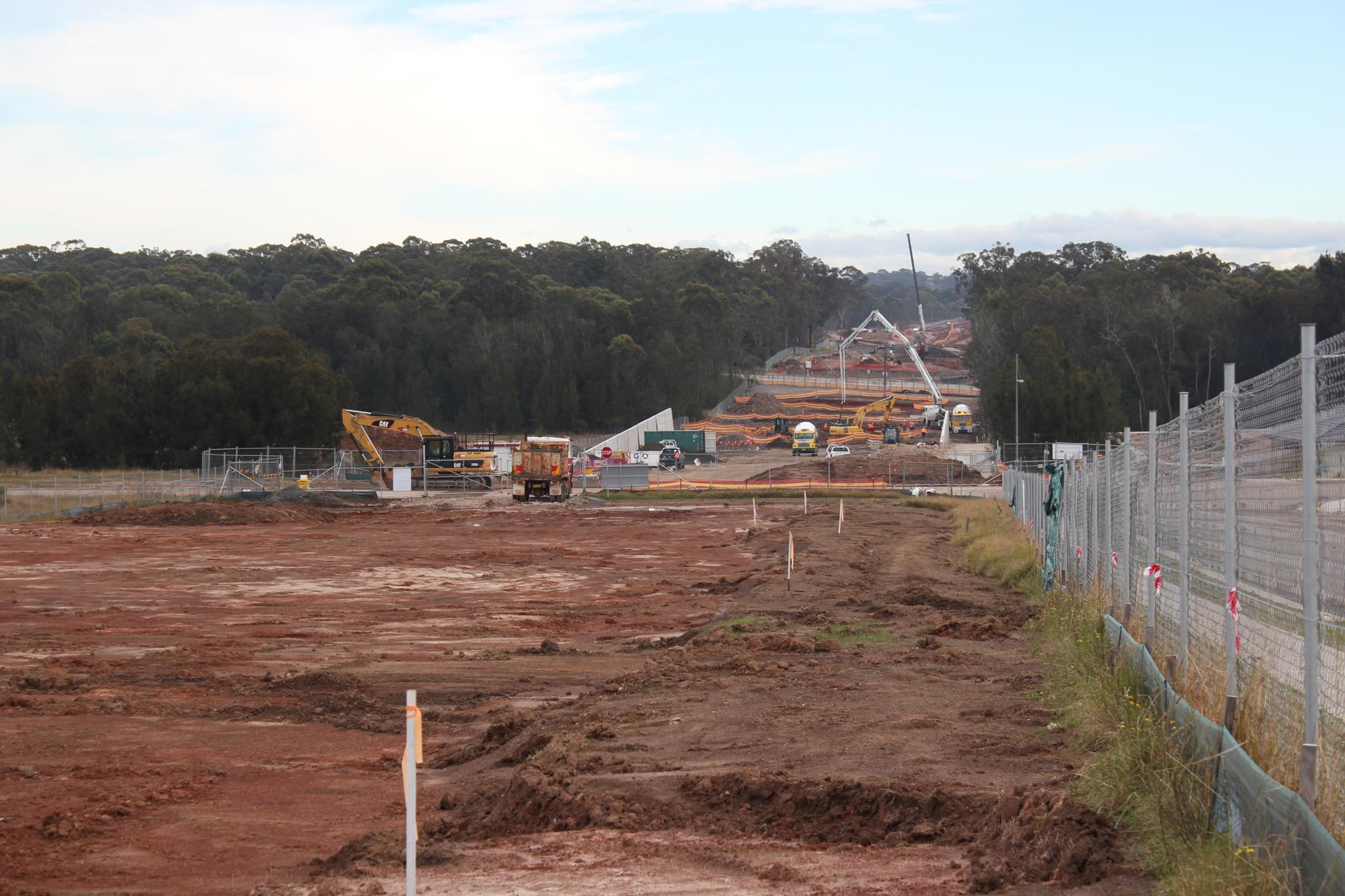
Edmondson Park station construction site in June 2012

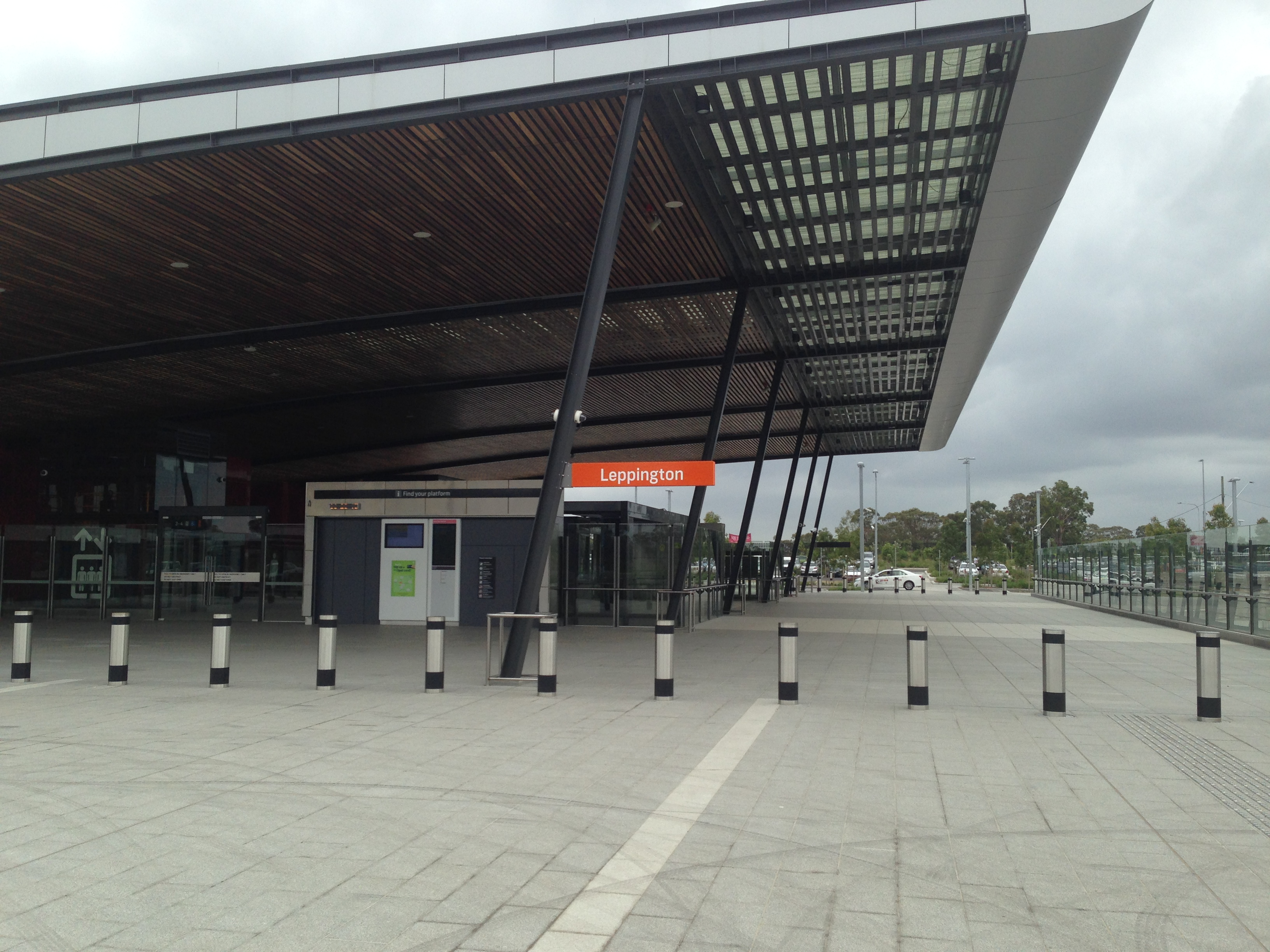
Leppington station entrance in February 2015

Stage two included extending the railway line westward towards Leppington. This involved:

- A rail flyover on the south side of Glenfield station to take the new line over the Main South Line and the Southern Sydney Freight Line.
- 11.4 kilometres of double track from Glenfield to Leppington.
- Stations and car parks at Edmondson Park and Leppington.
- A new train stabling facility to the west of Leppington with a capacity for 20 8-car trains.

Stage two received planning approval on 18 November 2010. On 7 December 2010, Premier Kristina Keneally announced that a contract for design and construction of stage two had been awarded to the John Holland Group.

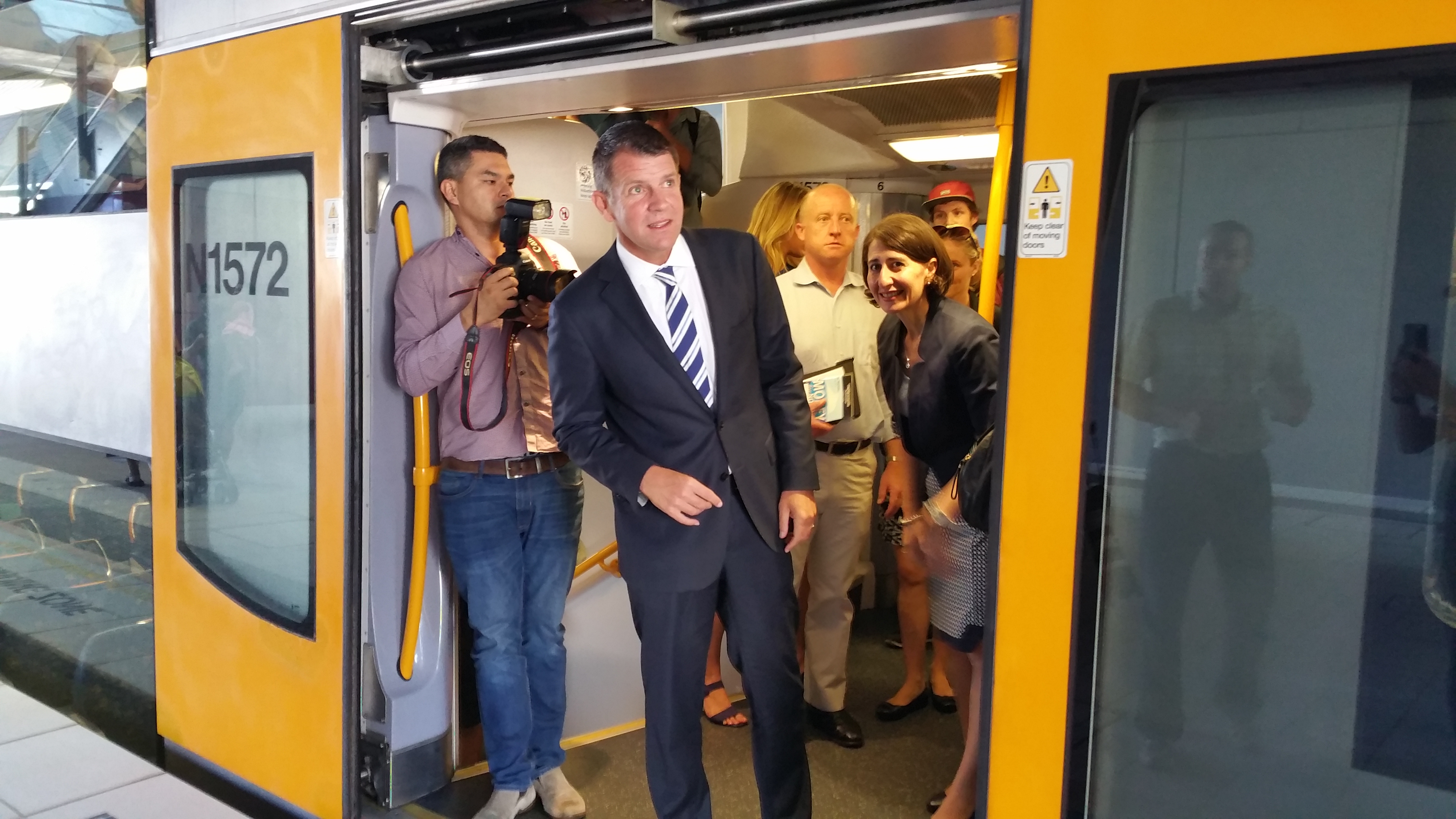
Premier Mike Baird with Transport Minister Gladys Berejiklian at Leppington station for the South West Rail Link opening in February 2015

On 13 September 2014, the NSW Government announced that construction was complete, saying the line had come in $300 million under budget and a year ahead of schedule. The line opened 8 February 2015.

==== Associated projects ====
Two associated projects affect the line.

The East Hills Line’s Kingsgrove to Revesby quadruplication Rail Clearways project opened in April 2013. It improved the capacity of the East Hills line by allowing the separation of express services to Leppington or Macarthur from all-stops services to Revesby.

The Auburn stabling project provided additional capacity to stable trains.

== Operation ==
On 6 November 2014, the NSW Government announced that train testing had commenced on the line. Passenger services began on 8 February 2015, initially as a four carriage shuttle running every 30 minutes between Leppington and Liverpool. The shuttle stopped at all stations except Casula and was also branded as the South West Rail Link. On 13 December 2015, trains operate as part of the T2 Airport, Inner West & South Line, with some services operate to the city via Granville while others continue to terminate at Liverpool.

On 26 November 2017, the T2 Airport, Inner West & South Line was split into the T2 Inner West & Leppington Line. All T2 and T5 Cumberland Line services via Liverpool and Glenfield no longer operate to Campbelltown and were rerouted via South West Rail Link to start or terminate at Leppington.

== Extension proposals ==
Railway projects around Western Sydney Airport. Click map to view details.

It has been proposed that the line be extended from Leppington to the Western Sydney Airport at Badgerys Creek. However, as at 16 April 2014 the Federal Government has said it had no plans to build this train line. It did indicate a provision for a train line would be included in the development, this may include preparing the tunnels under the runway as part of the runway construction and preparing the underground space for a station.

In June 2015, the New South Wales government announced details for a plan to preserve corridors for extensions of the line. The government indicated it intends to preserve the corridors for the extensions but not to build them in the near future.

From Leppington, the line would extend to Rossmore, with a northern branch to Bringelly and a southern branch to Narellan. Proposed stations would be located at Rossmore, Bringelly, Maryland, Oran Park and Narellan. Preliminary investigations for an extension of the southern corridor from Narellan to the Main South railway line also commenced.

A scoping study into rail investment to service Western Sydney and the proposed Western Sydney Airport was announced by the New South Wales and Australian governments in November 2015. The study's final report was released in March 2018 and included a proposal to build a "North-South Link" from Schofields to Macarthur via the airport. The report also proposed an extension of the South West Rail Link from Leppington to the "Badgerys Creek Aerotropolis" – an area south of the airport. Passengers would need to interchange to access the airport itself. The North–South Link would use a similar corridor to the one being investigated for the extension of the South West Rail Link. This resulted in the corridor investigations into the South West Rail Link extensions being put on hold.

== See also ==
- Transport in Sydney in the 2010s
