= Glenfield railway station, Sydney =

Railway station in Sydney, New South Wales, Australia

Glenfield
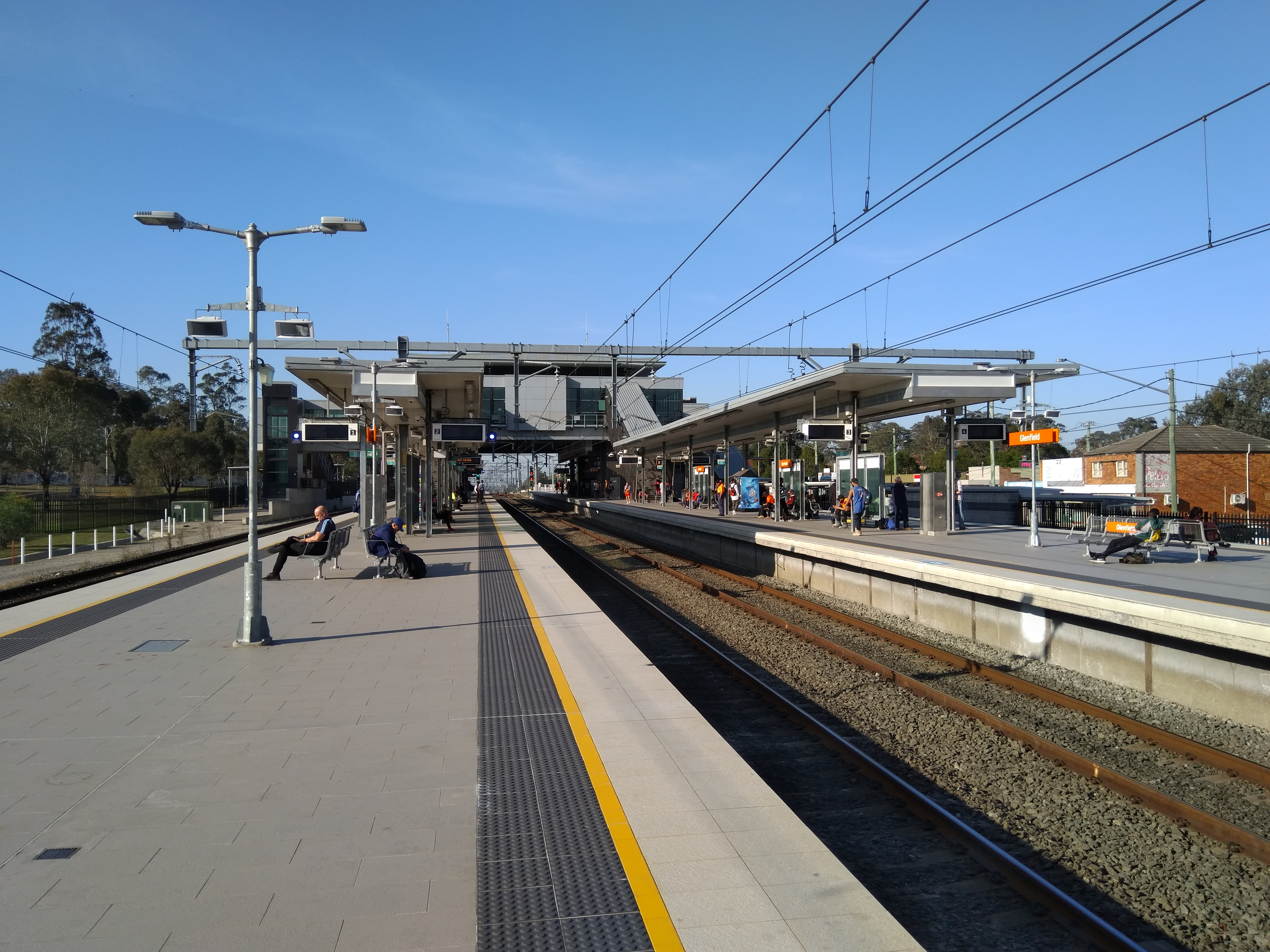
- Station platforms, shelters and concourse, September 2018

General information
- Location: Railway Parade, Glenfield; Australia
- Coordinates: 33°58′20″S 150°53′35″E
- Elevation: 23.2 metres (76 ft)
- Owner: Transport Asset Manager of New South Wales
- Operator: Sydney Trains
- Lines: Main Southern; East Hills; South West
- Distance: 30.5 kilometres (19.0 mi) from Central
- Platforms: 4 (2 island)
- Tracks: 5
- Connections: Bus

Construction
- Structure type: Ground
- Parking: Yes
- Accessible: Yes

Other information
- Status: Staffed
- Station code: GFD
- Website: Transport for NSW

History
- Opened: 6 September 1869
- Rebuilt: 27 March 1891; June 2014

Passengers
- 2025: 2,964,454 (year); 8,122 (daily) (Sydney Trains)
- Rank: 58

Services
Preceding station	Sydney Trains	Following station
Edmondson Park towards Leppington	Leppington & Inner West Line	Casula towards City Circle
Edmondson Park towards Leppington	Cumberland Line	Casula towards Richmond
Macquarie Fields towards Macarthur	Airport & South Line	Holsworthy towards City Circle
Preceding station	Intercity Trains	Following station
Campbelltown towards Moss Vale or Goulburn	Southern Highlands Line Limited morning and evening services	Central Terminus
Track layout
Location

Glenfield railway station is a junction station serving the Sydney suburb of Glenfield in Australia. It is served by Sydney Trains' T8 Airport & South, T2 Leppington & Inner West and T5 Cumberland line services, and by limited NSW TrainLink's Southern Highlands Line services.

== Configuration ==
The station lies on the Main South railway line. Five hundred metres north of the station the East Hills line joins, while south of the station the South West Rail Link branches off.

== History ==
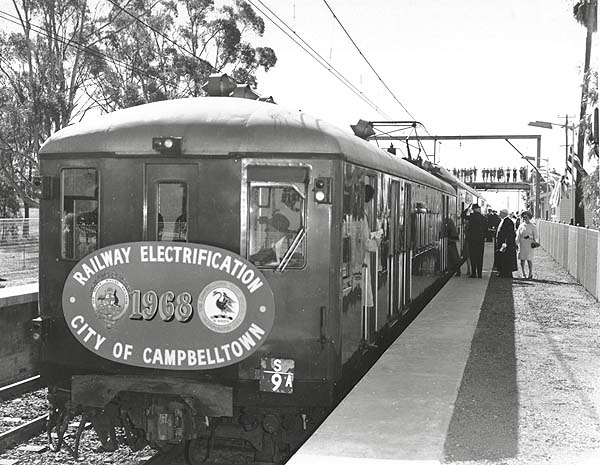
Platform 3 in 1968

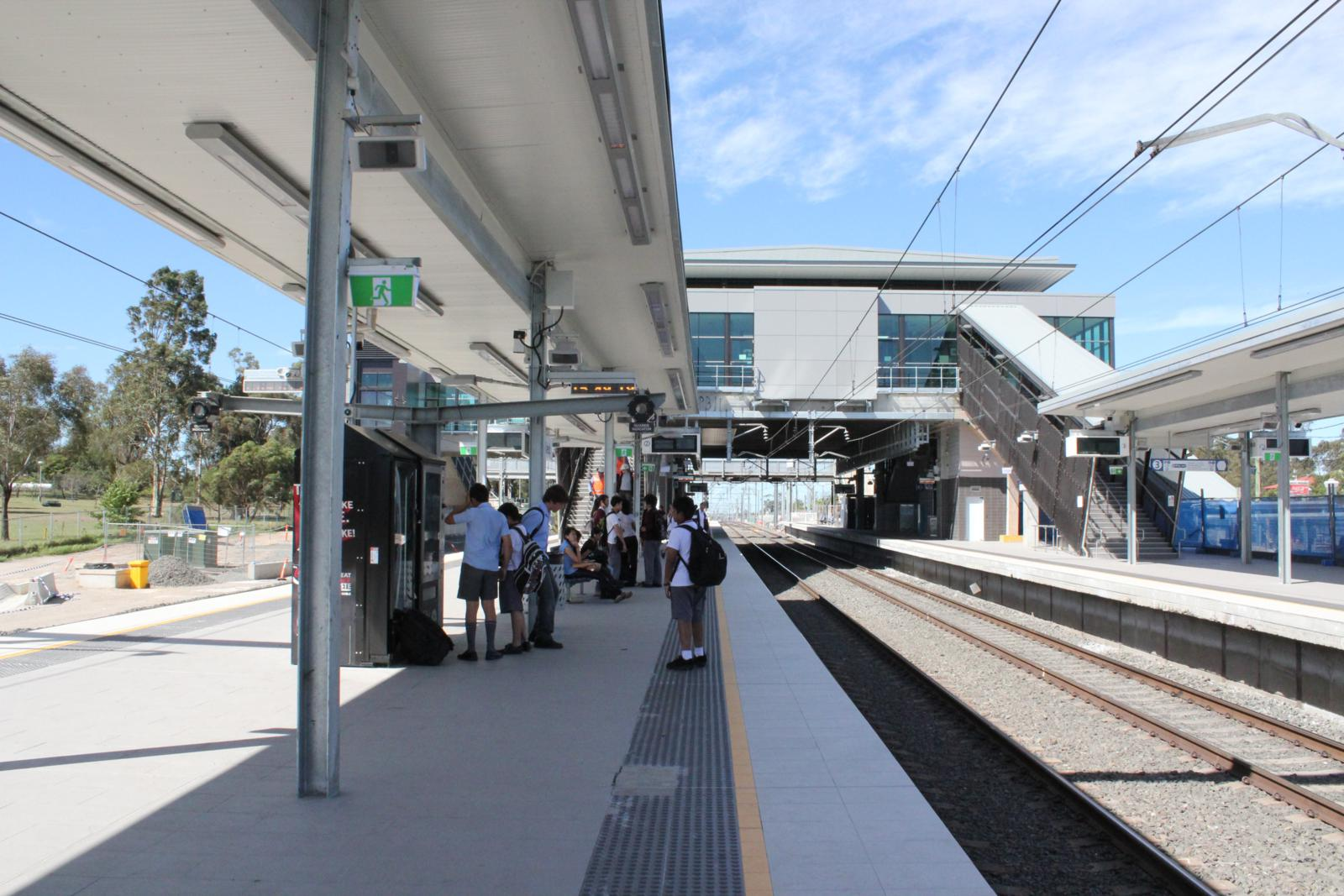
New concourse in December 2012

The station opened on 6 September 1869, about ten years after the opening of the Main South line. The initial platform was located north of the current station, being relocated to its current position on 27 March 1891. Originally the station consisted of two side platforms.

=== A junction station ===
The role of Glenfield changed significantly with the opening of the East Hills to Glenfield extension of the East Hills line on 21 December 1987, which joins the Main South line just north of Glenfield station. The platform buildings were substantially redeveloped at this time.

An additional track was opened to the west of the station in 1995 as part of the Glenfield–Ingleburn passing loop. This unelectrified track was used by freight and long-distance passenger trains. In December 2012, the track was incorporated into the Southern Sydney Freight Line and became freight only.

In 1996, as part of the Y-link works at Granville which created the Cumberland Line, Glenfield gained an extra platform (the current platform 1). Platform 1 was created as a side turnback for terminating trains via Liverpool by converting the existing side platform for Central-bound trains into an island platform.

=== A hub for South West Sydney ===
Glenfield is served by trains operating to and from the north, south, east and west

Glenfield station received further redevelopment and expansion as a result of the construction of the South West Rail Link to Leppington. Upgrades in the Glenfield area included the construction includes new car parks, a bus interchange, a new overhead concourse with lifts, a new platform and the replacement of a flat junction between the Main South and East Hills lines with a grade separated junction. A new temporary ticket office was constructed opposite the station in the Magee Lane car park. This served as the ticket office until the construction work at the station was completed. A temporary footbridge provided access to the station after the original eastern entrance was closed. In June 2014, once work was completed, the East Hills line flyover opened, platform 1 became a through platform and platform 4 was brought into service, creating two island platforms.

Construction of the line to Leppington commenced in the second quarter of 2010. This included a flyover just south of Glenfield to take the new line over the existing lines. The line opened on 8 February 2015.

From November 2017, all services from north of Glenfield operate to and from Leppington, with the line between Glenfield and Macarthur served exclusively by services operating via the T8 Airport/Sydenham Line. In recognition of the increased interchange at Glenfield, the works include a minor upgrade to the station that includes extended canopies and new service indicator screens.

== Platforms and services ==
Platform	Line	Stopping pattern	Notes
1	Airport & South Line	services to Central & the City Circle via the Airport; 13 weekday morning peak services to Central & the City Circle via Sydenham	
1	Southern Highlands Line	morning services to Central	1 weekday and 2 weekend services
2	Leppington & Inner West Line	services to Central & the City Circle via Granville and Liverpool	
2	Cumberland Line	services to Blacktown, Schofields and Richmond	T5 Richmond services operates late at night and weekend early mornings.
3	Leppington & Inner West Line	services to Leppington	
3	Cumberland Line	services to Leppington	
4	Airport & South Line	services to Macarthur; 6 weekday evening peak services to Campbelltown	
4	Southern Highlands Line	1 evening service to Moss Vale; 1 evening service to Goulburn	Pick up only on weekdays; the weekday service divides at Moss Vale

== Transport links ==
Transit Systems operates five bus routes via Glenfield station, under contract to Transport for NSW:

- 864: to Carnes Hill via Horningsea Park
- 867: to Prestons
- 870: Campbelltown Hospital to Liverpool station via Harrow Road
- 871: Campbelltown Hospital to Liverpool station via Leacock Lane
- 872: Campbelltown Hospital to Liverpool station via Eucalyptus Drive

Glenfield station is served by one NightRide route:

- N30: Macarthur station to Town Hall station
