= Edmondson Park railway station =

Railway station in City of Liverpool, New South Wales, Australia

Edmondson Park
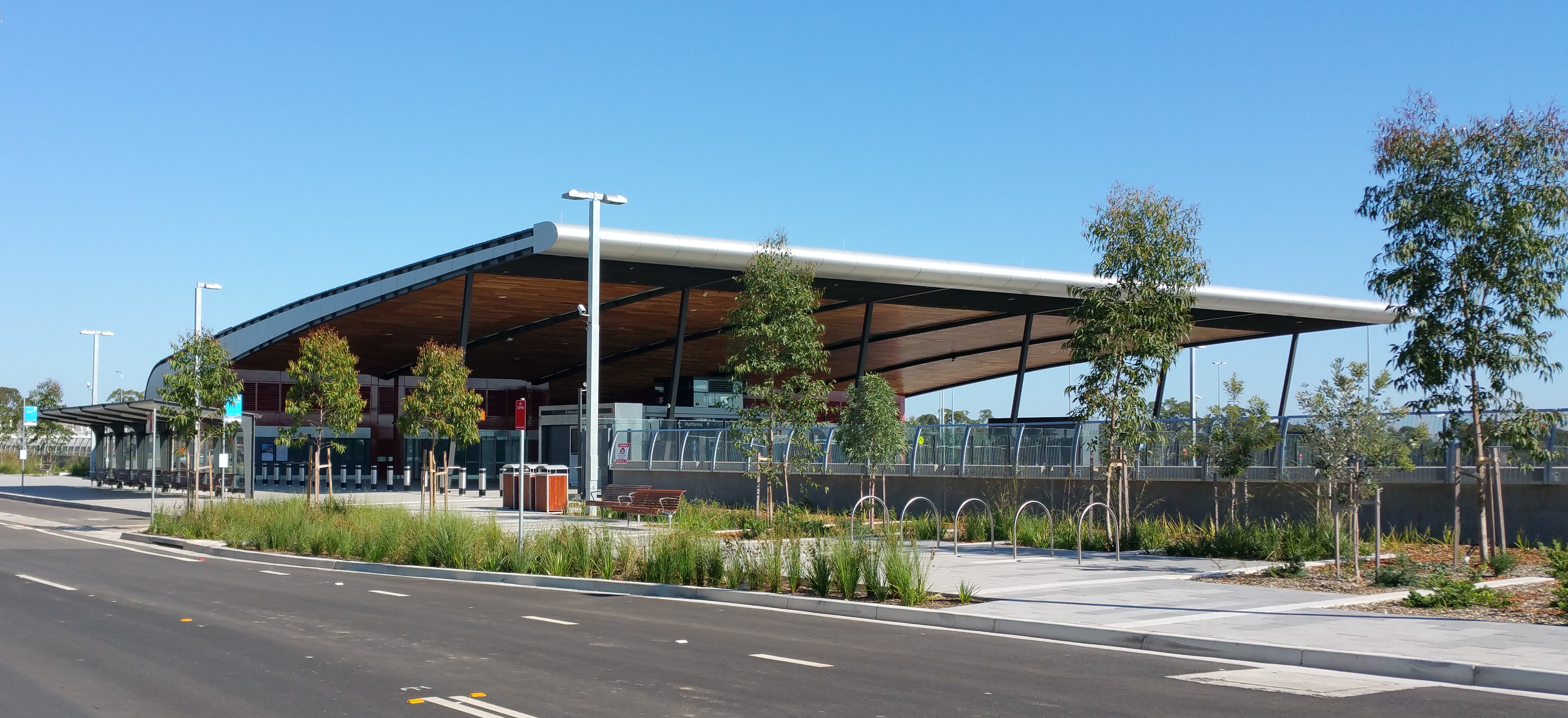
- The station entrance in February 2015

General information
- Location: Edmondson Park; Sydney, New South Wales; Australia
- Coordinates: 33°58′09″S 150°51′31″E
- Owner: Transport Asset Manager of New South Wales
- Operator: Sydney Trains
- Line: South West Rail Link
- Distance: 45.4 km (28.2 mi) from Central
- Platforms: 2 (1 island)
- Tracks: 2
- Connections: Bus

Construction
- Structure type: Ground
- Accessible: Yes

Other information
- Status: Weekdays: Staffed: 6am to 7pm: Weekends and public holidays: Staffed: 6am to 7pm
- Website: Transport for NSW

History
- Opened: 8 February 2015 (11 years ago)
- Electrified: Yes (since opening)

Passengers
- 2025: 2,243,743 (year); 6,147 (daily) (Sydney Trains)
- Rank: 71

Services
Preceding station	Sydney Trains	Following station
Leppington Terminus	T2 Leppington & Inner West Line	Glenfield towards City Circle
Leppington Terminus	T5 Cumberland Line	Glenfield towards Richmond
Location

Edmondson Park railway station is a suburban railway station located on the South West Rail Link, serving the Sydney suburb of Edmondson Park in the Liverpool Local Government Area. It is served by Sydney Trains T2 Leppington & Inner West Line and T5 Cumberland Line services.

== History ==
Edmondson Park opened on 8 February 2015. It has one island platform with two faces. Initial services consisted of a half-hourly shuttle between Leppington and Liverpool. From 13 December 2015, trains operate directly to the city via Granville. From 26 November 2017, Cumberland Line services stop at the station, providing a link to Parramatta, Blacktown, Schofields and Richmond.

== Services ==
=== Platforms ===
Platform	Line	Stopping pattern	Notes
1	T2 Leppington & Inner West Line	services to Central & the City Circle via Liverpool and Granville	
1	T5 Cumberland Line	services to Blacktown, Schofields and Richmond	
2	T2 Leppington & Inner West Line	services to Leppington	
2	T5 Cumberland Line	services to Leppington	

=== Transport links ===
Transit Systems NSW operates three bus routes via Edmondson Park station, under contract to Transport for NSW:

- 859: to Carnes Hill
- 868: to Ingleburn
- 869: Liverpool station to Ingleburn station

Edmondson Park station is served by one NightRide route.

- N31: Leppington to Liverpool
