= Macquarie Fields railway station =

Railway station in Sydney, New South Wales, Australia

Macquarie Fields
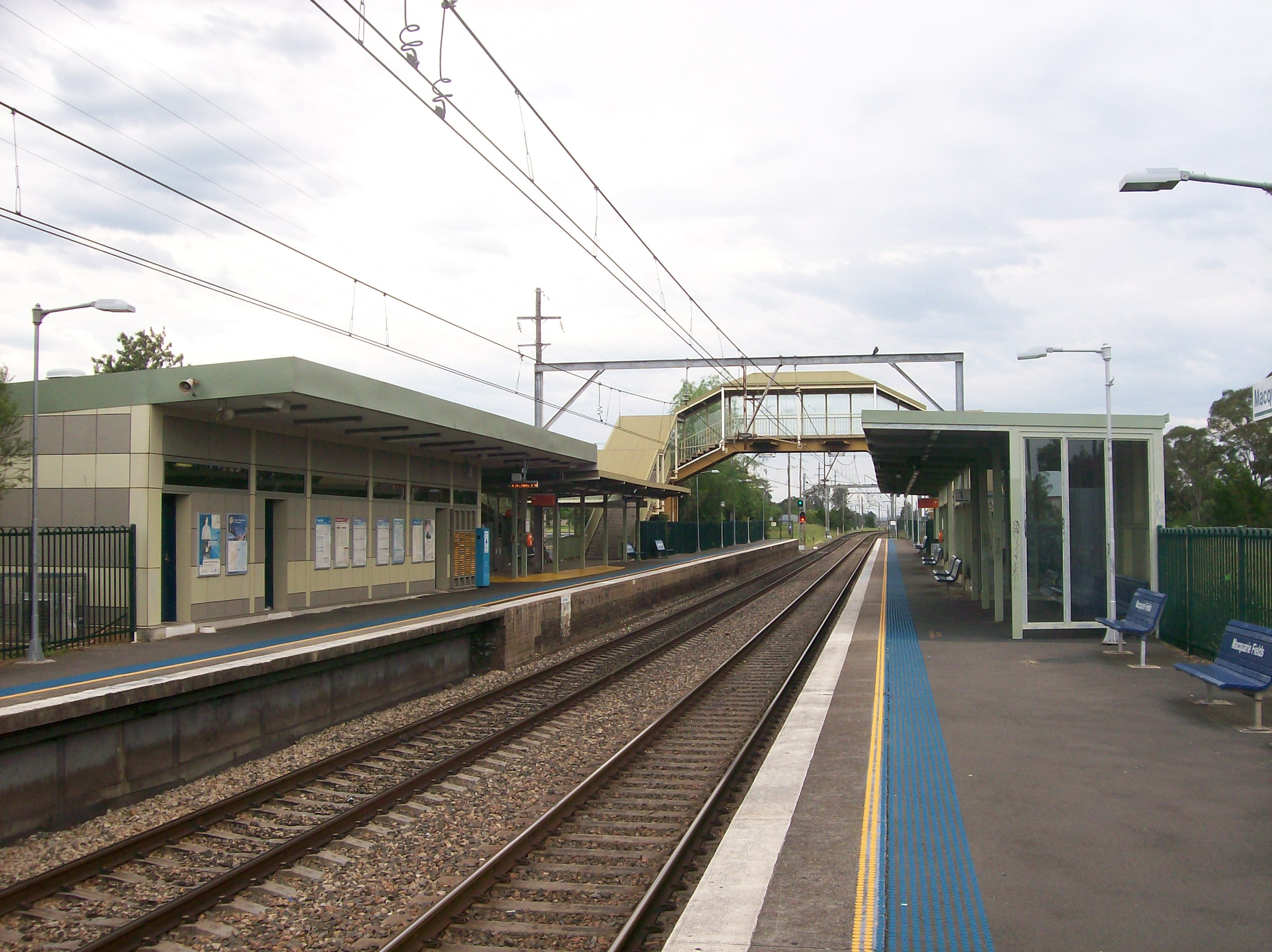
- Southbound view from Platform 1, November 2011

General information
- Location: Railway Parade, Macquarie Fields
- Coordinates: 33°59′06″S 150°52′43″E
- Owner: Transport Asset Manager of New South Wales
- Operator: Sydney Trains
- Line: Main Southern
- Distance: 33.80 kilometres (21.00 mi) from Central
- Platforms: 2 side
- Tracks: 3
- Connections: Bus

Construction
- Structure type: Ground
- Accessible: Yes

Other information
- Status: Weekdays: Staffed: 6am to 7pm: Weekends and public holidays: Staffed: 8am to 4pm
- Station code: MQF
- Website: Transport for NSW

History
- Opened: 3 October 1888

Passengers
- 2025: 482,775 (year); 1,323 (daily) (Sydney Trains)
- Rank: 161

Services
Preceding station	Sydney Trains	Following station
Ingleburn towards Macarthur	T8 Airport & South Line	Glenfield towards City Circle
Location

Macquarie Fields railway station is located on the Main Southern line, serving the Sydney suburb of Macquarie Fields. It is served by Sydney Trains' T8 Airport & South line services.

== History ==
Macquarie Fields station opened on 3 October 1888.

An additional track was opened to the west of the station in 1995 as part of the Glenfield - Ingleburn passing loop. This unelectrified track was used by freight and long-distance passenger trains. In December 2012, the track was incorporated into the Southern Sydney Freight Line and became freight only.

It has been reported that a ghost of a woman haunts the station, where crying and screaming are often heard at night after train services have stopped. In July 1906, a 42-year-old woman named Emily Hay Georgeson was reportedly run over and killed by a train.

Since the second half of 2017, Macquarie Fields railway station has been served exclusively by the Airport and East Hills line, meaning commuters have to change at Glenfield to travel to either the city via Granville or to Blacktown via the Cumberland Line.

In 2024, it was announced that the station would be receiving a multi-million dollar upgrade and overhaul, improving accessibility, commuter access and parking. Construction began in late 2024 and was completed in the middle of 2026.

== Platforms and services ==
Platform	Line	Stopping pattern	Notes
1	T8 Airport & South Line	services to Central & the City Circle via Revesby	
2	T8 Airport & South Line	services to Macarthur; 2 weekday evening peak services to Campbelltown	

== Transport links ==
Transit Systems operates one bus route via Macquarie Fields station, under contract to Transport for NSW:

- 876: to Eucalyptus Drive, peak extension to Long Point

== Gallery ==
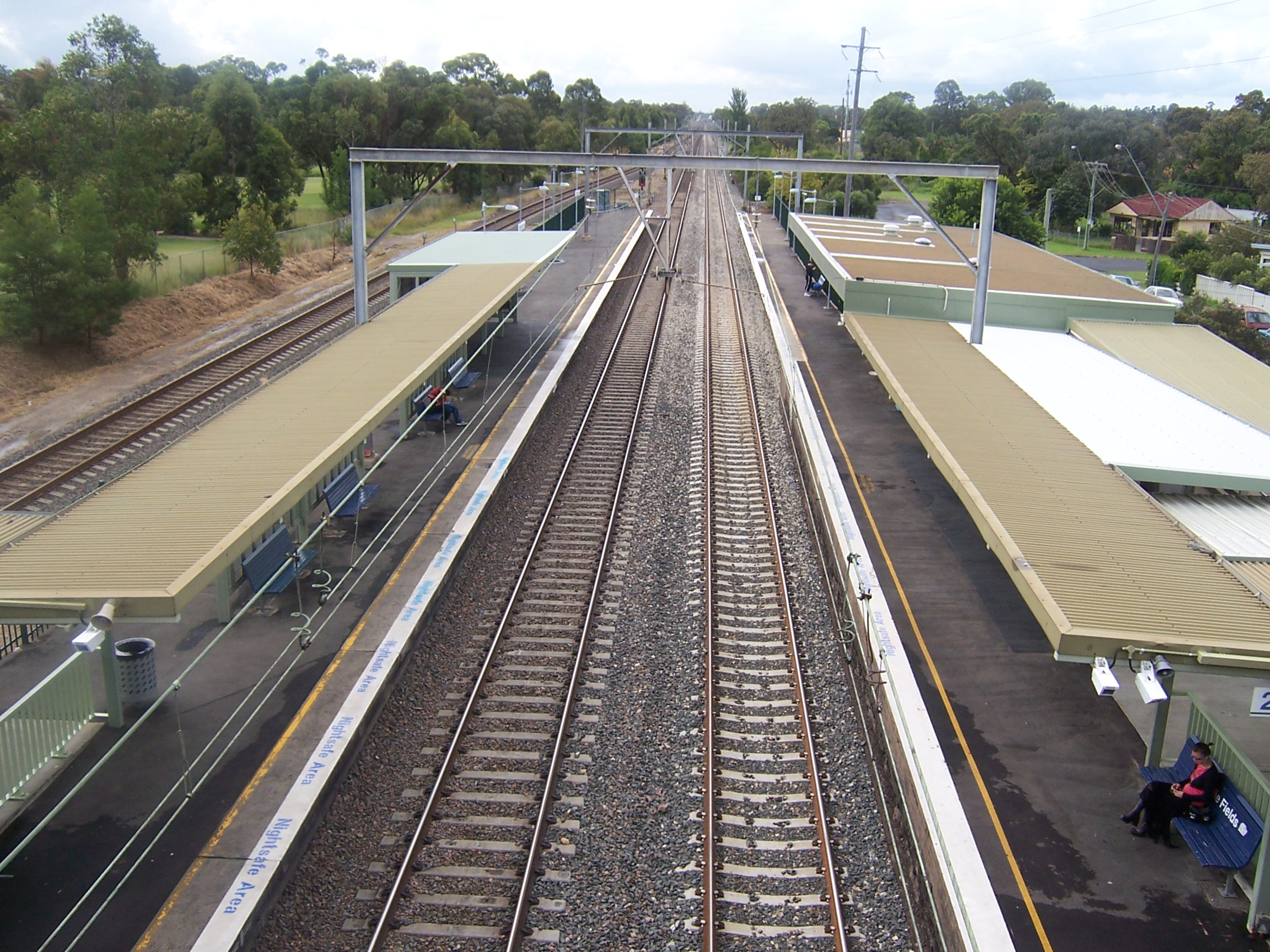
Northbound view from the station footbridge in April 2008

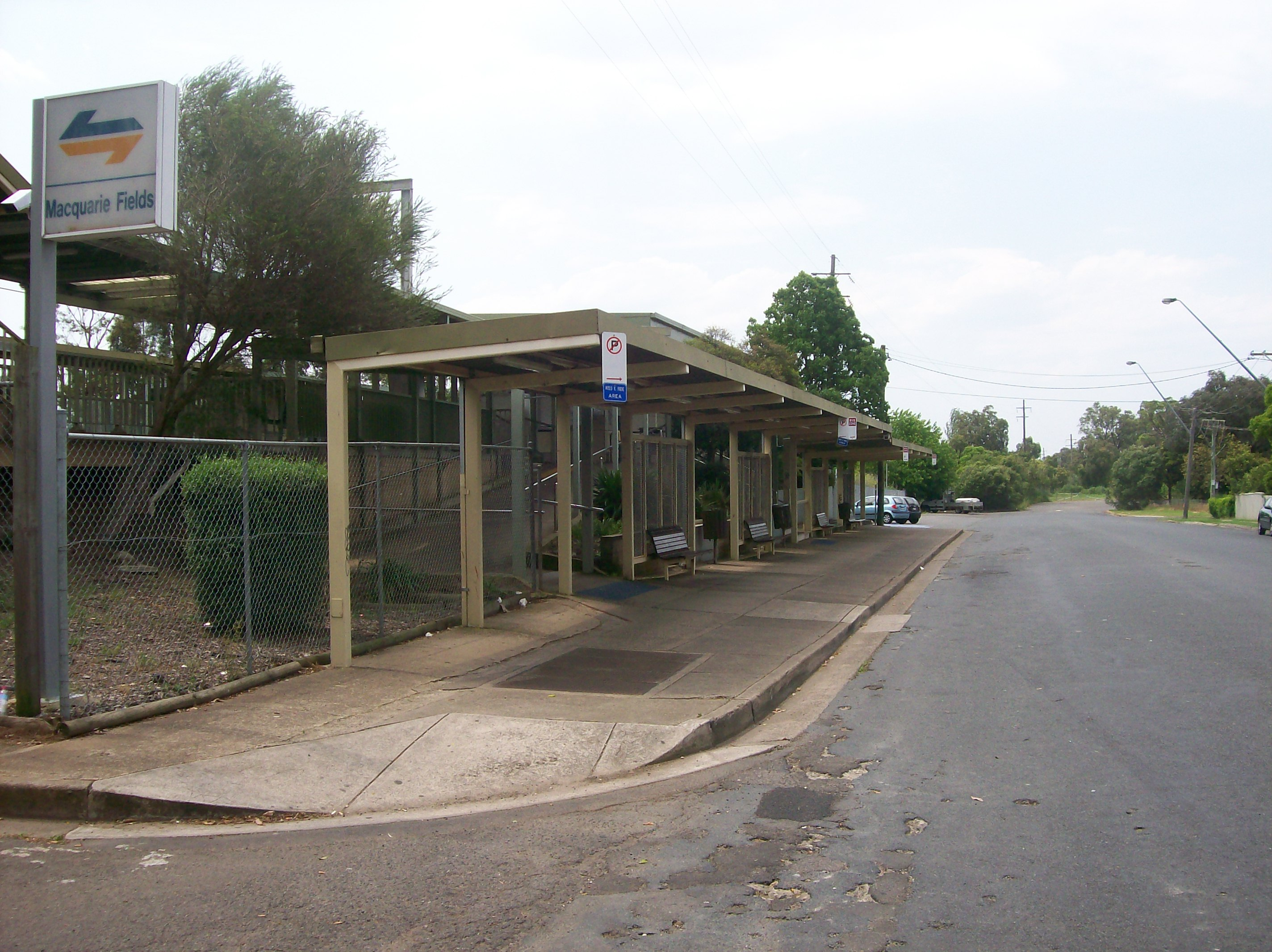
The station bus stop located outside the entrance, in November 2011

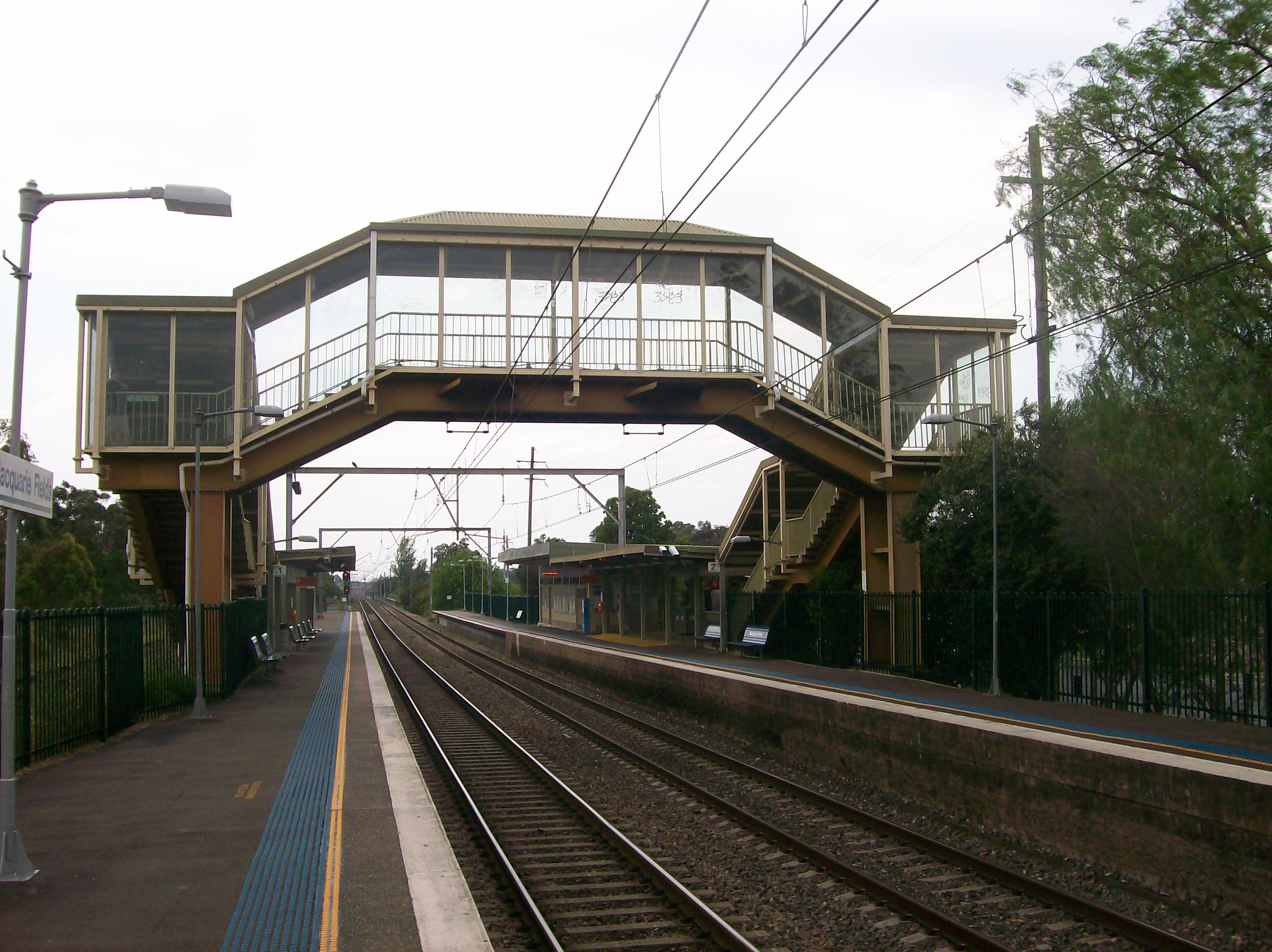
Northbound view of the station footbridge in November 2011

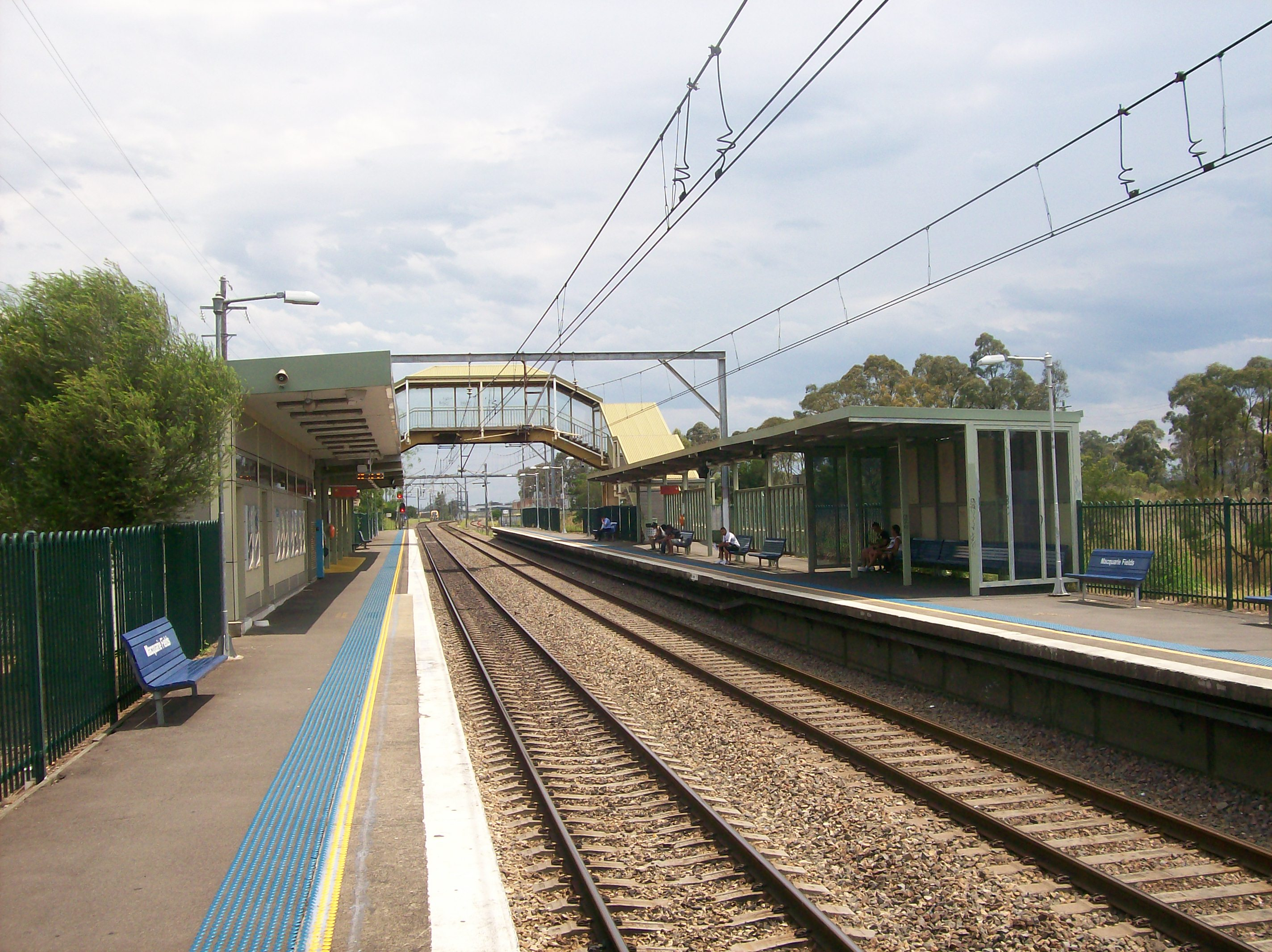
Southbound view of the station from Platform 2 in November 2011

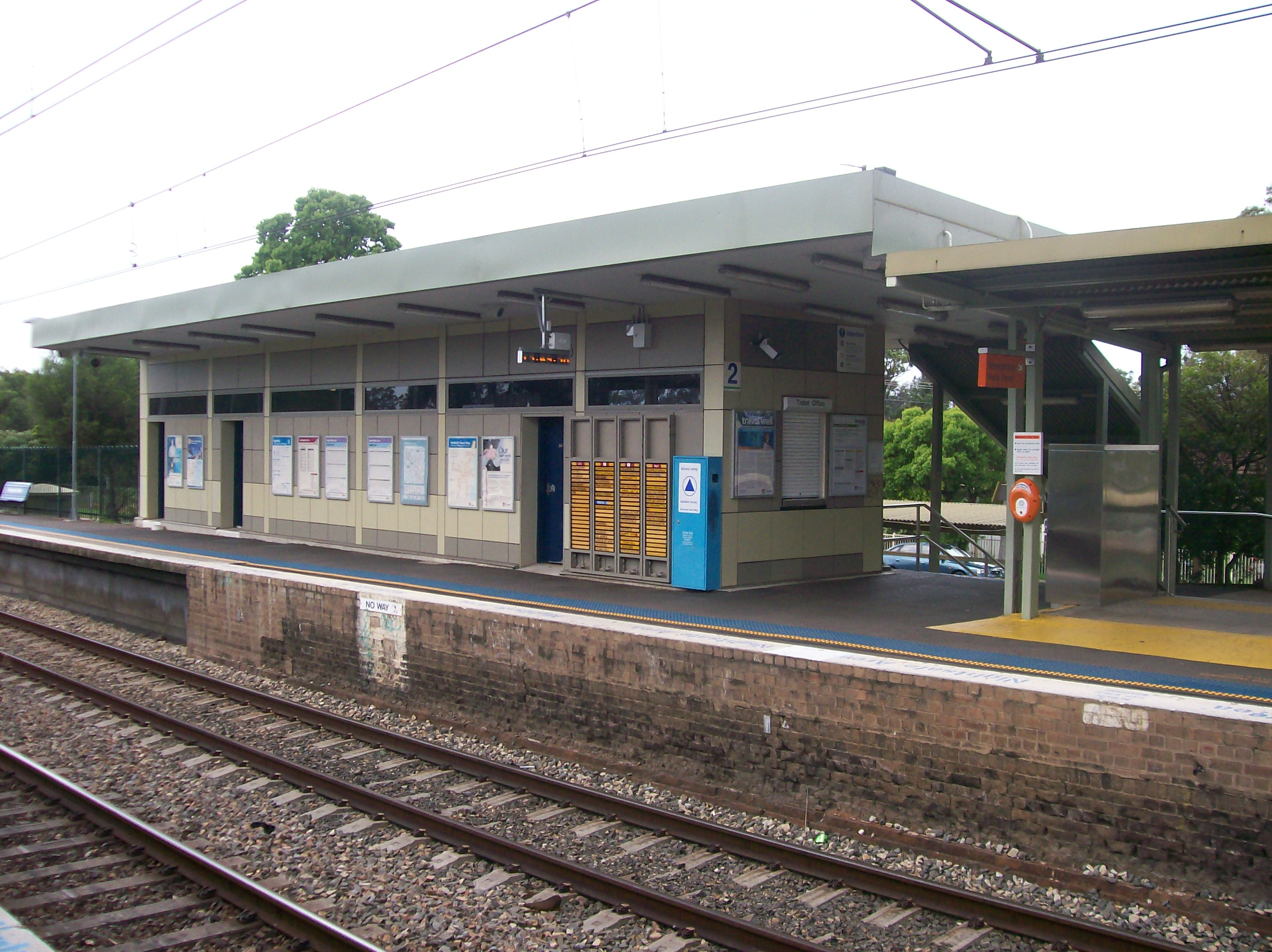
The station building on Platform 2 in November 2011

== Bumberry Junction railway station ==
Bumberry Junction

General information
- Coordinates: 33°59′15″S 150°52′32″E
- Line: Main South line
- Platforms: 1 (formerly)
- Tracks: 1

Other information
- Status: Demolished and closed

History
- Opened: 27 March 1891
- Closed: 2 June 1892

Services
Preceding station	Former services	Following station
Ingleburn towards Albury	Main Southern Line	Macquarie Fields towards Sydney
Location

Bumberry Junction railway station was a temporary railway station on the Main Southern line between Ingleburn and Macquarie Fields stations.

=== History ===
Bumberry Junction (likely a play on words based it being located at the bridge over Bunbury Curran creek) was built for the duplication effort of the line between Liverpool and Campbelltown. The station opened 27 March 1891. It did not appear in passenger timetables however it appeared in working timetables "for the use of officers and employees only".

In August 1891, the station was receiving 4 down services and 4 up services. With the occasional Special running such as "Cook's Special Cheap Excursions".

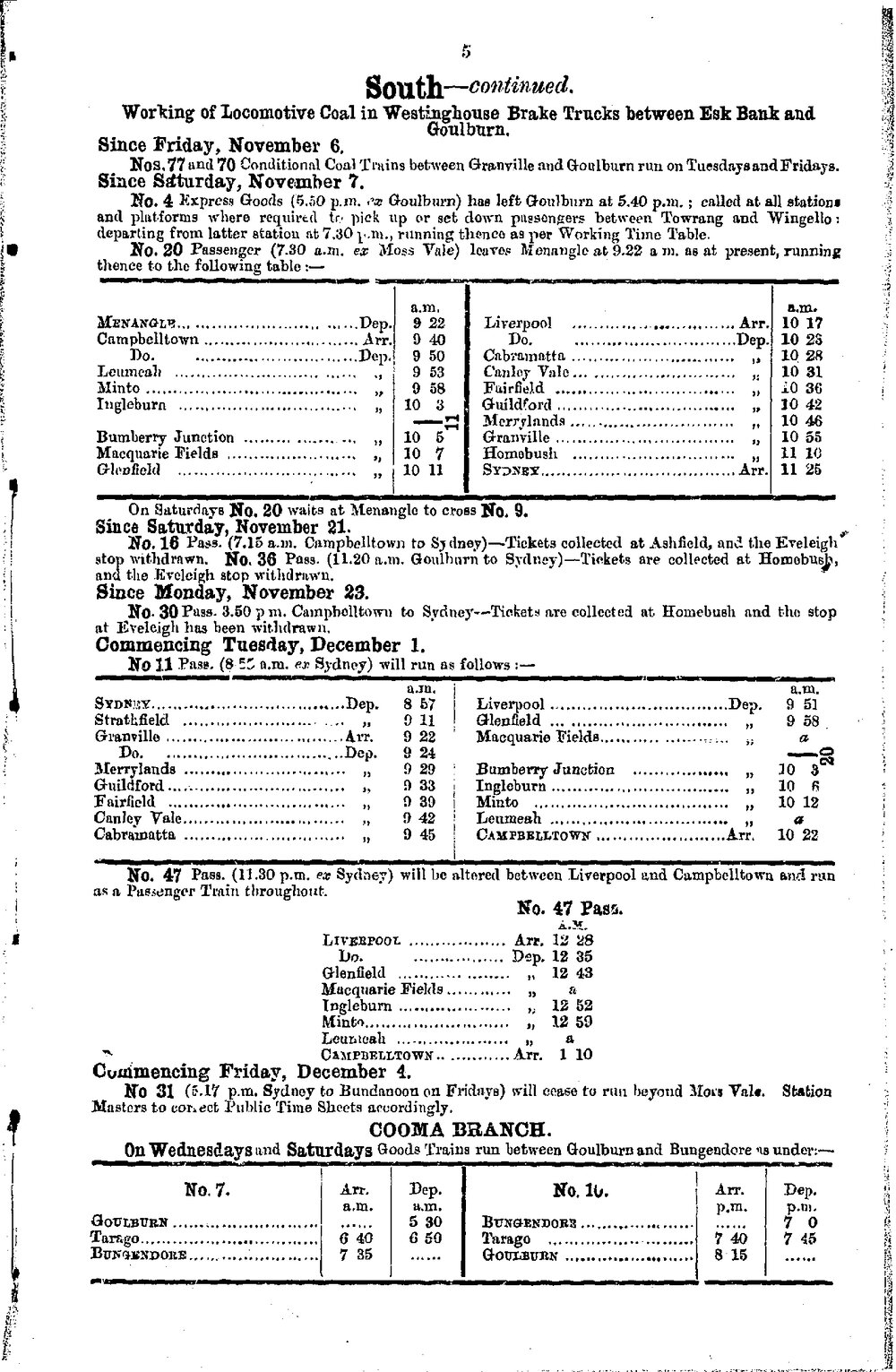
New South Wales Government Railways monthly notice no. 12 : December 1891.

The station had access to the railway telegraph network until 4 April 1892.

The station was decommissioned 2 June 1892 with the completion of the bridge across Bunbury Curran Creek.
