= Glenfield, New South Wales =

Glenfield
- Suburb
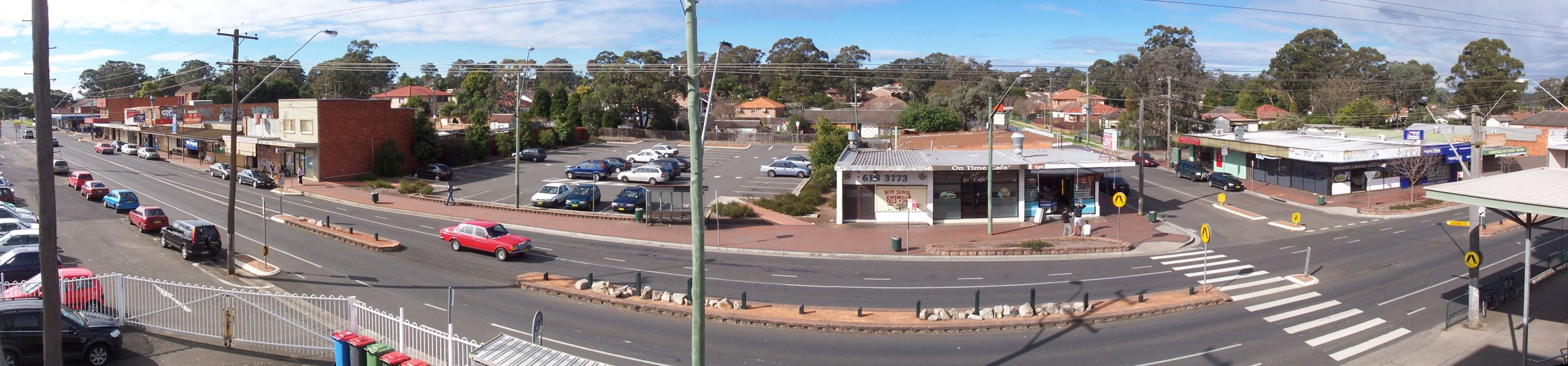
- Glenfield Panorama

- Interactive map of Glenfield
- Coordinates: 33°57′54″S 150°53′35″E
- Country: Australia
- State: New South Wales
- City: Sydney
- LGA: City of Campbelltown
- Location: 36 km (22 mi) SW of Sydney
- Established: 1881

Government
  - State electorate: Macquarie Fields
  - Federal divisions: Hughes; Werriwa
- Elevation: 25 m (82 ft)

Population
  - Total: 10,536 (2021 census)
- Postcode: 2167
Suburbs around Glenfield
Prestons	Casula	Liverpool
Edmondson Park	Glenfield	Moorebank
Macquarie Links	Macquarie Fields	Holsworthy

Glenfield is a suburb of Sydney, in the state of New South Wales, Australia. Glenfield is located 36 kilometres south-west of the Sydney central business district, in the local government area of the City of Campbelltown and is part of the Macarthur region.

== History ==
Glenfield was named after the property founded by early colonial surgeon and explorer, Charles Throsby. According to local authorities and Campbelltown City Library, the property was named after the Glenfield in Leicestershire, England, where Throsby was born and brought up. Many of the streets in the suburb have links to British names, such as Canterbury Road, Cambridge Avenue and Trafalgar Street.

The name was first used when Glenfield railway station was built in 1869 although a village didn't begin to develop until 1881 when the first subdivision of the paddocks were marketed. A public school opened in a tent the following year and a local post office was established in 1899. Hurlstone Agricultural High School also moved to Glenfield in the 1920s. However, the suburb did not really develop until the 1950s and 1960s.

=== 1968 Siege ===
Glenfield gained notoriety in 1968 as the site of a hostage siege which ended in bizarre circumstances with the NSW Commissioner of Police Norm Allen acting as witness to the wedding of gunman Wally Mellish and hostage Beryl Muddle. The incident was made into the movie Mr Reliable starring Colin Friels and Jacqueline McKenzie.

== Climate ==
Climate data for Glenfield (Macquarie)
Month	Jan	Feb	Mar	Apr	May	Jun	Jul	Aug	Sep	Oct	Nov	Dec	Year
Record high °C (°F)	41.0 (105.8)	41.1 (106.0)	41.1 (106.0)	35.3 (95.5)	29.7 (85.5)	24.4 (75.9)	25.6 (78.1)	28.3 (82.9)	35.6 (96.1)	36.7 (98.1)	39.2 (102.6)	41.0 (105.8)	41.1 (106.0)
Mean daily maximum °C (°F)	27.9 (82.2)	27.9 (82.2)	26.6 (79.9)	24.5 (76.1)	20.7 (69.3)	18.0 (64.4)	17.7 (63.9)	18.7 (65.7)	21.2 (70.2)	23.6 (74.5)	25.6 (78.1)	27.6 (81.7)	23.3 (73.9)
Mean daily minimum °C (°F)	16.4 (61.5)	16.8 (62.2)	15.3 (59.5)	11.2 (52.2)	7.6 (45.7)	5.5 (41.9)	3.1 (37.6)	4.7 (40.5)	6.9 (44.4)	10.5 (50.9)	12.1 (53.8)	15.0 (59.0)	10.4 (50.7)
Record low °C (°F)	8.3 (46.9)	9.4 (48.9)	3.3 (37.9)	3.1 (37.6)	−0.6 (30.9)	−2.2 (28.0)	−4.7 (23.5)	−1.9 (28.6)	−0.3 (31.5)	0.6 (33.1)	2.8 (37.0)	6.7 (44.1)	−4.7 (23.5)
Average precipitation mm (inches)	80.5 (3.17)	78.9 (3.11)	95.5 (3.76)	62.2 (2.45)	67.2 (2.65)	80.0 (3.15)	59.3 (2.33)	51.1 (2.01)	40.1 (1.58)	56.6 (2.23)	61.4 (2.42)	61.9 (2.44)	795.7 (31.33)
Average precipitation days	7.7	8.4	8.4	7.1	6.9	7.7	6.1	7.0	6.8	7.6	7.5	7.3	88.5

== Population ==
According to the 2021 census, Glenfield had a population of 10,536 people with higher than average numbers of couples with children (57.1%). 46.0% of people were born in Australia. The next most common countries of birth were India 9.3%, Nepal 4.7%, Bangladesh 4.4%, Philippines 3.6% and China 3.1%. 40.4% of people spoke only English at home. Other languages spoken at home included Bengali 5.9%, Nepali 5.8%, Arabic 3.7%, Hindi 3.6% and Mandarin 3.3%. The most common responses for religion were Catholic 18.5%, No Religion 17.4%, Hinduism 16.0%, Islam 11.9% and Not stated 8.1%. Most occupied private houses in the area are separate houses (69.2%) with a substantial number of townhouses (28.1%).

== Housing ==
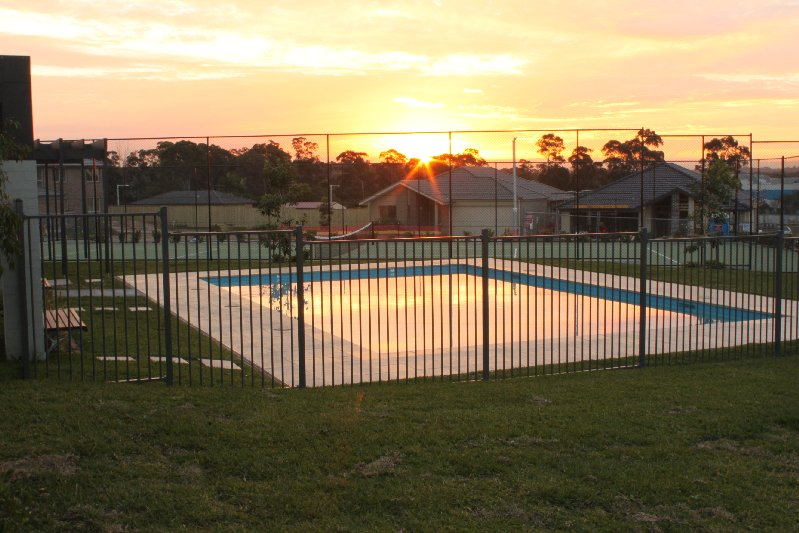
New Facilities in the Vista Estate

A number of new residential subdivisions have been developed in the north-western corner of Glenfield in the area bounded by Campbelltown Road and Glenfield Road. These developments are called Panorama, Vista at Panorama, Glenfield Circuit & Parkside Glenfield and are mixed density housing comprising duplex and freestanding housing.

Panorama, Vista at Panorama estates are community titled with amenities such as pool, tennis courts, security patrols and barbecues that are available for exclusive use of residents. Community activities such as cocktails nights, family fun days and street Christmas parties are also organized by a third-party company to encourage a close knit community atmosphere.

== Transport ==
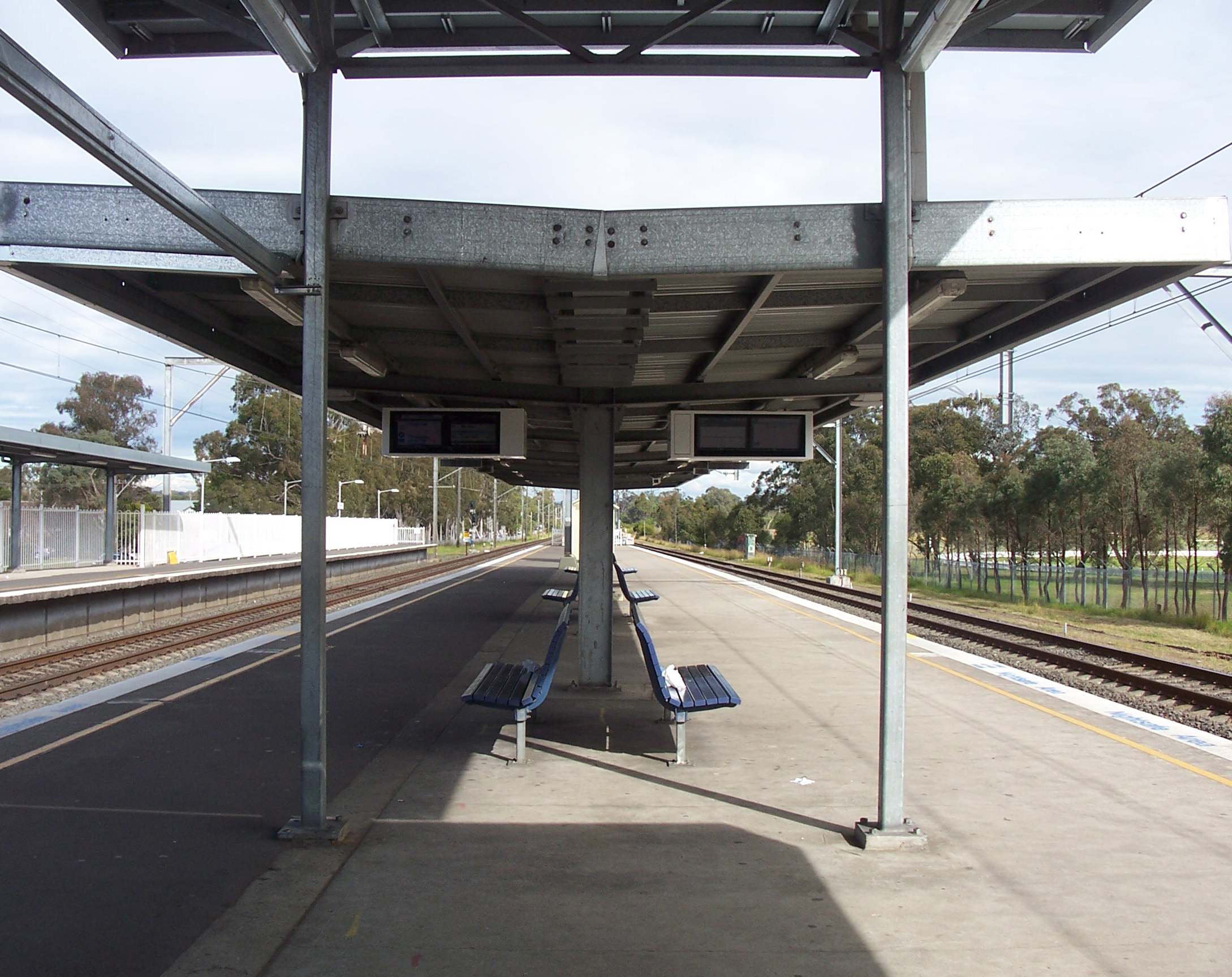
Glenfield Railway Station before upgrades.

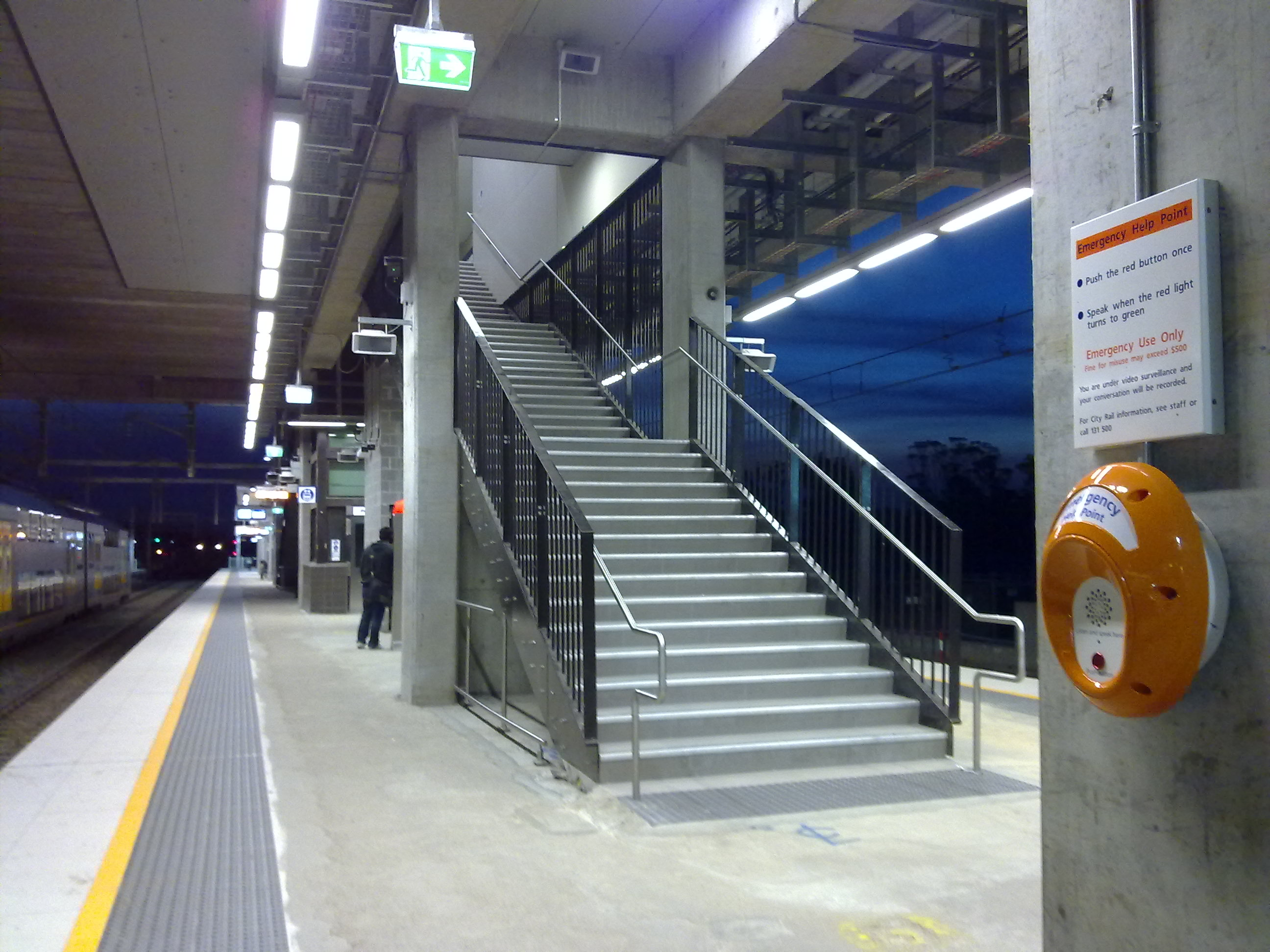
Platforms 1 and 2 of Glenfield station, with stairways leading to an overhead concourse.

Glenfield railway station is a major interchange station for South-West Sydney. It is the junction for the East Hills railway line and the South West Rail Link and the Main Southern railway line. The station received a major upgrade as part of the South West Rail Link, including construction of an overhead concourse, multi-storey car park, new, fourth platform and conversion of a terminating platform to a through platform. The new railway line west to Leppington opened on 8 February 2015, meaning trains now serve Glenfield from the north, south, east and west.

The M5 South Western Motorway and Hume Highway sit on the western border of Glenfield. Additionally, the Westlink M7 is also close to its western border.

== Schools ==
- Ajuga School – a school for students with a complex trauma history and/or autism spectrum disorder, K–12
- Campbell House School – a school for behavioural needs students, Year 7 onwards
- Glenfield Park School – a school for behavioural needs students
- Glenfield Public School
- Glenwood Public School
- Hurlstone Agricultural High School – a selective high school

== Sports grounds ==
- Seddon Park – used primarily for Cricket and Rugby league.
- Blinman Park – used primarily for Cricket and Soccer
- Kennett Park – used for Baseball
- Glenfield Tennis Courts

== Notable residents ==
- Human Nature – attended Hurlstone Agricultural High School as students.

== See also ==
- Samuel Leonard Boyd
