= Samuel Leonard Boyd =

Australian murderer

- Born: Scotland
- Occupation: Tradesman
- Status: Incarcerated
- Criminal charge: Murder x 4, wounding with intent to murder x 1
- Penalty: 4 x life imprisonment + 25 years without parole (redetermined)

Samuel Leonard Boyd is an Australian spree killer from New South Wales, currently serving four consecutive sentences of life imprisonment plus 25 years without the possibility of parole for the murder of four people and the malicious wounding of a fifth between September 1982 and April 1983.

Boyd emigrated from Scotland with his family at age 11.

== First murder: September 1982 ==
Boyd slashed the throat of a young, married mother of two, Rhonda Celea, while he was working at her home as a pest exterminator in Busby. Celea's naked body was found lying in a hallway with a child's dress over her face and her underwear, pantyhose and dress around her.

== Liverpool murder: 22 April 1983 ==
After a drinking session at a pub in Liverpool, Australia, Boyd beat his drinking buddy, Gregory Wiles, to death with a hammer before dumping the body on a roadside, where he was found with his pants pulled down to his knees.

== Glenfield massacre: 22 April 1983 ==
Later that same day of the Wiles killing, Boyd drove to the Glenfield Park School for children with special needs in Glenfield, Australia, where his mother had previously worked. and forced three female supervisors, Helen Hartup, Patricia Volcic and Olive Short, "to undress, perform sex acts on him and each other, bound their hands and feet and walked up and down from one victim to another slashing and stabbing each in turn in the neck". Olive Short was the only one to survive the attack.

== Arrest, trial and sentencing ==
Boyd was arrested by special operations police on 22 April 1983, the day of the Glenfield massacre.

In January 1985, Boyd was convicted on four counts of murder and one of malicious wounding by a jury, and was sentenced to 5 consecutive terms of life imprisonment without parole by Chief Justice O'Brien. Boyd unsuccessfully appealed against his convictions.

In 1994 Boyd applied to have a minimum term determined, but Justice Carruthers refused to fix a minimum term, calling Boyd's crimes "the worst category of murder", and the life sentence for the malicious wounding was redetermined under new laws to the new maximum of 25 years.

An appeal against this decision was dismissed on 3 November 1995. As the malicious wounding sentence expired in 2008, Boyd is serving the four consecutive life sentences.

In 2016, Boyd made a final attempt to have a minimum term set, offering to undergo chemical castration in exchange for parole. Asked why he thought the medication might help him he replied, "If my libido is a problem, as the court deems it is, then it has to be addressed." Boyd has denied being sexually excited by violence against women, and he told the court he had not had any fantasies of sadistic behaviour since he was incarcerated, and initially blamed the murders on cannabis and pesticides. If this application is rejected, then (subject to appeals) Boyd will live the rest of his natural life in custody.
