= Casula railway station =

Railway station in Sydney, New South Wales, Australia

Casula
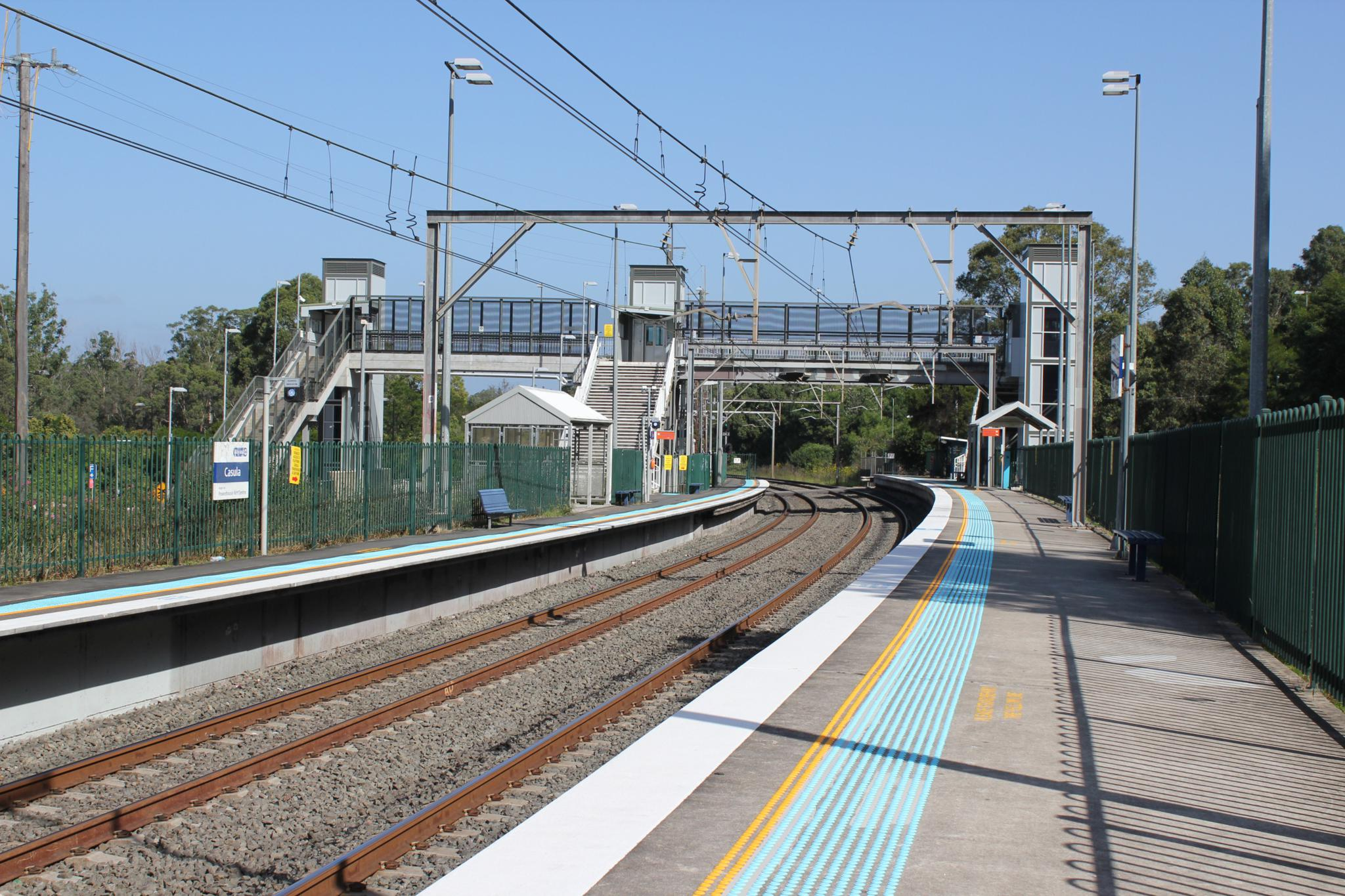
- Southbound view from Platform 1 in April 2012

General information
- Location: Casula Road, Casula; Sydney, New South Wales; Australia
- Coordinates: 33°56′59″S 150°54′43″E
- Elevation: 23 metres (75 ft)
- Owner: Transport Asset Manager of NSW
- Operator: Sydney Trains
- Line: Main Southern
- Distance: 38.80 kilometres (24.11 mi) from Central
- Platforms: 2 (2 side)
- Tracks: 3

Construction
- Structure type: Ground
- Parking: Yes
- Accessible: Yes

Other information
- Status: Weekdays: Unstaffed: Weekends and public holidays: Unstaffed
- Station code: CSL
- Website: Transport for NSW

History
- Opened: 1 November 1894 (131 years ago)
- Electrified: Yes (from May 1968)

Passengers
- 2025: 199,215 (year); 546 (daily) (Sydney Trains)
- Rank: 191

Services
Preceding station	Sydney Trains	Following station
Glenfield towards Leppington	Leppington & Inner West Line	Liverpool towards City Circle
Glenfield towards Leppington	Cumberland Line	Liverpool towards Richmond
Location

Casula railway station is a suburban railway station located on the Main Southern line, serving the Sydney suburb of Casula. It is served by Sydney Trains T2 Leppington & Inner West Line and T5 Cumberland Line services.

== History ==
Casula station opened on 1 November 1894. In October 1993, a footbridge was installed. Due to its low patronage, Casula is unattended by staff.

As part of the construction of the Southern Sydney Freight Line, which opened to the east of the station in January 2013, Casula received an easy access upgrade with lifts to the platforms and the existing footbridge extended. The level crossing was replaced in September 2012 with a new road constructed from the north.

The Casula Powerhouse arts centre is located adjacent to the station's eastern side.

== Services ==
=== Platforms ===
Platform	Line	Stopping pattern	Notes
1	T2	services to Central & the City Circle via Liverpool and Granville	
1	T5	services to Blacktown, Schofields & Richmond	
2	T2	services to Leppington	
2	T5	services to Leppington	
