= Khem Sambo =

Cambodian journalist

- Born: 1961
- Died: 11 July 2008 (aged 46–47)
- Occupation: Journalist

Khem Sambo (Khmer: ខឹម សម្បូរ) was a Cambodian journalist. He wrote for the opposition Khmer-language daily journal Moneaseka Khmer and was affiliated with the Sam Rainsy Party. Sambo was one of the publication’s most outspoken reporters.

== Work ==
He criticized the government's corruption and illegal land-grabbing. He reported on topics such as the problematic distribution of benefits from Chinese investment in the country, and corruption under the Hun Sen government.

== Death ==
On 11 July 2008, he was shot twice while riding his motorcycle with his 21-year-old son in Phnom Penh. He died in the hospital along with his son. The murder occurred during the campaign preceding the 27 July general elections.

On 14 July, the Committee to Protect Journalists (CPJ) condemned the murders and called upon Cambodian Prime Minister Hun Sen to launch an independent investigation about the killing. The CPJ was of the view that Sambo may have been killed in reprisal for his reporting on government corruption, and that the attack was meant to intimidate journalists and the public.
