= Samuel Boyd (Florida politician) =

Florida state legislator

Samuel Boyd (July 4, 1847 - August 25, 1872) was an American clerk, treasurer, justice of the peace, and state legislator in Florida. He represented Nassau County, Florida in the Florida House of Representatives in 1871 and 1872. He also served as in Fernandina, Florida as a clerk, treasurer, and justice of the peace.

He was born in South Carolina. He was one of the first black public officials in Florida when he served as clerk of Fernandina.

In the Florida House he served on the Judiciary and Commerce and Navigation committees. His committees investigated railroad bonds and elections. He chaired a committee commemorating deceased members.

== See also ==
- Reconstruction era
- African American officeholders from the end of the Civil War until before 1900
