= Campbelltown and Camden Hospitals =

Camden and Campbelltown Hospitals
- South Western Sydney Local Health District
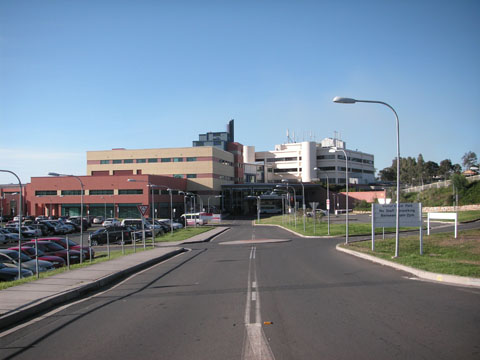

Geography
- Location: Camden, New South Wales; Campbelltown, New South Wales, Australia
- Coordinates: 34°03′45″S 150°41′38″E Camden; 34°04′40″S 150°48′19″E Campbelltown

Organisation
- Care system: Medicare (Public)
- Type: Teaching, District General
- Affiliated university: Western Sydney University

Services
- Emergency department: Yes
- Beds: 306

Helipads
- Helipad: (ICAO: YXCP)
Number	Length		Surface
Number	ft	m	Surface
1			concrete

History
- Founded: 1902 (Camden); 1977 (Campbelltown)

Links
- Website: www.swslhd.health.nsw.gov.au/ccq/
- Lists: Hospitals in Australia

Camden and Campbelltown Hospitals are New South Wales public hospitals servicing the Macarthur region in South West Sydney. Camden and Campbelltown hospitals operate under a single, common executive management structure, with services delivered across both hospitals.

== Campbelltown Hospital ==
Campbelltown Hospital, the larger hospital (more than 306 beds possible), operates a 40-bed 24-hour Emergency Department on its Level 0. Campbelltown Hospital ED sees the third-largest number of presentations per year in New South Wales. In addition to the ED, it has clinical services in specialist medicine, surgery, child and family health services, mental health and drug and alcohol addiction services, and Aboriginal and community health services. All branches of medicine are represented, and the hospital is able to offer most surgical services. Specialist services not available at Campbelltown Hospital, such as cardiothoracic, neurosurgery, ophthalmology, dermatology and infectious diseases/clinical microbiology, are provided by on-call services from Liverpool Hospital.

Campbelltown Hospital also has a large oncology service and the largest pediatric department in New South Wales outside of the dedicated children's hospitals (Children's Hospital at Westmead, Sydney Children's at Randwick and John Hunter Children's Hospital).

Campbelltown Hospital currently consists predominantly of four major buildings (Blocks A, B, C and D), in addition to a separate Cancer Therapy Centre and the youth and adult mental health units (Birunji, Waratah and Gna Ka Lun buildings).

Campbelltown Hospital is also the home of the Western Sydney University (WSU) Macarthur Clinical School, near the hospital's current helipad. The Clinical School provides clinical skill training to WSU medical students.

=== Campbelltown Hospital history ===
The building of Campbelltown Hospital had initially been foreshadowed by the Askin Liberal NSW Government, in an election campaign promise, but which it subsequently dawdled over, drawing fire from then Prime Minister Gough Whitlam whose electorate of Werriwa included Campbelltown's northern suburbs.

Eventually though, construction began and the 30-bed Campbelltown Hospital was officially opened by then NSW Premier Neville Wran on 1 October 1977 (this building is now referred to as Block B of Campbelltown Hospital).

By April 1978, the hospital had increased its beds to 120, including a 10-bed Pediatric Ward. Campbelltown Hospital opened Australia's first day-surgery unit on 24 March 1984.

Block C was added in June 1986, increasing capacity to 210 beds.

The Macarthur Cancer Therapy Centre was added in February 2003.

Block A was added in 2006, providing new operating theatres, a new emergency department and new intensive care and high-dependency units.

Block D was added in August 2015, improving outpatients services, adding a physiotherapy gym and surgical wards.

The University of Western Sydney Clinical School opened in 2007, with its Macarthur Clinical School Building opened in April 2017.

==== Campbelltown Hospital Redevelopment ====
On 21 March 2012, then New South Wales Premier Barry O'Farrell announced plans for a major works redevelopment of Campbelltown Hospital.

Stage 1 of the redevelopment project completed in 2016 and delivered:

- An additional 248 car park spaces
- An additional 90 inpatient beds with capacity for a further 30;
- Four birthing rooms;
- Two cardiac catheterisation laboratories/intervention suites;
- A paediatric outpatients unit; and
- Expanded space for multiple departments.

On 17 June 2017, then New South Wales Premier Gladys Berejiklian announced Stage 2 of the redevelopment project would commence, that would expand and enhance capacity and services across multiple departments as well as provide for a seven level multi-story car park with over 800 spaces. Stage 2 is not expected to complete until 2023.

== Camden Hospital ==
Camden Hospital, the smaller of the two (more than 74 beds possible), is a largely subacute hospital that specializes in select clinical services for largely older persons with acute or chronic health conditions, namely rehabilitation, palliative care, geriatric evaluation and management, and psychogeriatric care.

Camden Hospital also maintains an eight-bed 24-hour Emergency Department on Level 2. It is also the home site of the University Medical Clinic of Campbelltown and Camden (where specialist outpatient consultations are provided) and the Karitane Residential Family Care Unit. Camden Hospital currently consists predominantly of a Main Building (Hodge Block) and a Heritage Wing.

=== Camden Hospital history ===
While Campbelltown Hospital is much larger than Camden Hospital today, Camden Hospital has the longer history, with its permanent location having been in continuous operation over 100 years.

On 19 January 1898, the Camden Municipal Council proposed to establish a cottage hospital for the municipality. On 12 April 1899, a two-story house known as Edithville, located on Mitchell Street, was converted into a temporary 12-bed hospital facility.

On 24 May 1902, then New South Wales Premier John See opened a permanent, made for purpose 12-bed facility, Camden Cottage Hospital on Windmill Hill. In its first year of operation, it treated 102 patients. By 1914, the number of patients treated had more than doubled, and the cottage hospital was feeling the strain, so the government decided to fund the hospital's expansion which saw it redeveloped and re-opened as Camden District Hospital on 10 June 1916.

The four-storey P.B. Hodge Block was added to Camden District Hospital in March 1971, which doubled the number of beds possible for the hospital. In 1990, a day unit and aged care and rehabilitation centre was added, followed by a university medical clinic in 2008, and an eight-bed Karitane residential family care unit in 2010.
