= Queen Street Buildings =

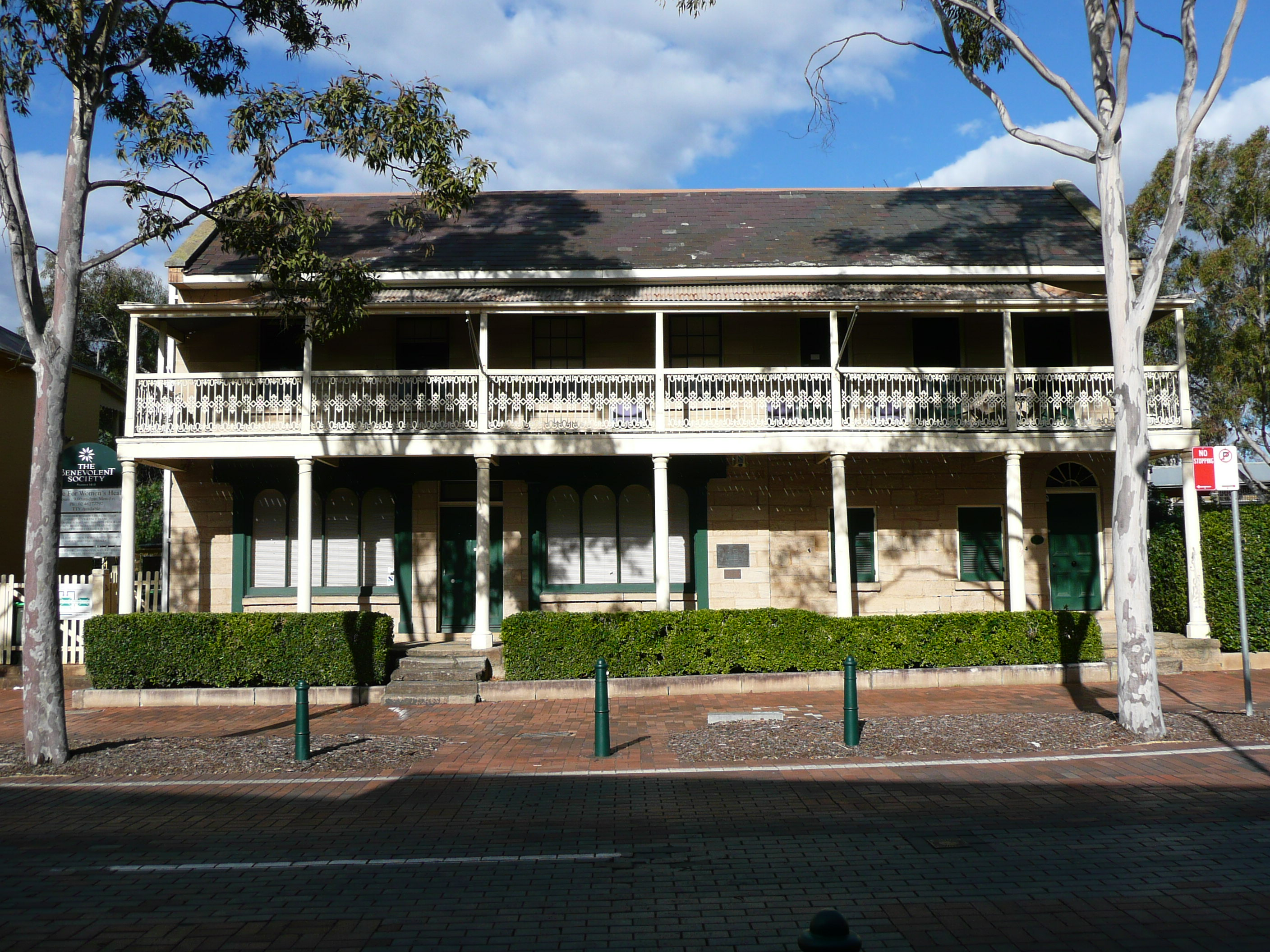
- Legacy House, c. 1856, pictured in 2008.

- Location within Sydney Location within Australia
- 34°04′11″S 150°48′44″E
- Location: 284–298 Queen Street, Campbelltown, City of Campbelltown, New South Wales, Australia

Site notes
- Owner: Minister For Administering The Environmental & Planning Act, 1979

New South Wales Heritage Register
- Official name: Queen Street Buildings Group; McGuanne House; Old Railway Hotel; William Bursill's Shop; The Coach House
- Type: State heritage (complex / group)
- Designated: 2 April 1999
- Reference no.: 7
- Type: Shop
- Category: Retail and Wholesale
- Builders: John Doyle (hotel); William Bursill (Bursill's Shop); Cobb and Bocking (Old Coach House)

Queen Street Buildings are a group of heritage-listed former shops and hotel at 284–298 Queen Street, Campbelltown, in the City of Campbelltown local government area of New South Wales, Australia. The structures were built by John Doyle (hotel), William Bursill (Bursill's Shop), and Cobb and Bocking (The Coach House). It is also known as Queen Street Buildings Group, McGuanne House, Old Railway Hotel, William Bursill's Shop and The Coach House. The property is owned by Minister for Administering the Environmental & Planning Act, 1979 (State Government). It was added to the New South Wales State Heritage Register on 2 April 1999.

== History ==
Permanent European settlement in the Campbelltown area had begun in 1809 as an alternative to the flood-prone Hawkesbury district. Work on a road from Sydney to Liverpool was started in 1811. It was opened in August 1814 and was soon extended further south to Appin. This road, variously known as Campbelltown Road, Appin Road or the Sydney Road, passed through Campbelltown. The section through the town was called the High Street until the last decade of the 19th century when it was renamed Queen Street.

The land on which the Queen Street cottages stand was part of a grant of 57 hectares (140 acres) to Joseph Phelps in 1816. He had been working the land for some years before receiving formal title to it. Phelps was one of the farmers of Airds and Appin who subscribed funds for a Sydney courthouse in July 1813. His grant was seized, possibly as soon as it was formally issued, by the provost marshal, William Gore, in lieu of payment by Phelps of debts totalling A£170. The land was auctioned in January 1817 to William Bradbury for £100 plus twelve cattle and the grain produced from the crop growing on the land.

Immediately north of Phelps' grant, Assistant Surveyor James Meehan had informally reserved 71 hectares (175 acres) for a village (AMCG, 1994 say "in 1815".) In 1816 most of the land in the area was granted, leaving a portion of 71 hectares (175 acres) unalienated, and surrounded by several grants.

The reserved land was formally declared a town by Governor Macquarie in December 1820 and named Campbelltown in honour of his wife (Elizabeth)'s family.

William Bradbury (1774–1836) a native of Birmingham, was transported to NSW aboard the "Guildford" in 1812. His wife Elizabeth remained in England but his daughter, Mary (1797–1852) followed her father to Australia in 1815. Bradbury had no other children in NSW, though he established a relationship with a woman named Alice and in April 1836 married a Campbelltown widow, Catherine Patrick, née Acres (c.1801–1883). Bradbury died two months later.

Governor Macquarie visited Campbelltown in January 1822. He and his party ate a "hearty" breakfast at 'Bradbury's', indicating that Bradbury had built an inn. This was probably the inn later known as the Royal Oak, on the western side of the High Street. Macquarie noted in his journal that 'Bradbury is building a very good two storey brick house on his own farm and on a very pretty eminence immediately adjoining Campbell-Town as an inn for the accommodation of the public, and having asked me to give his farm a name, I have called it Bradbury Park. In 1826 Bradbury Park House was considered by William Dumaresq, inspector of roads and bridges, as the best building in Campbelltown when he reported on buildings suitable for military use.

As the main street of Campbelltown, High Street or Sydney Road and later Queen Street, was at the edge of town, one side of the street was not within the town boundary while the other was. Canny traders soon realised that either side of the main road was as good as the other and leased or bought land from the grantees bordering the town proper. By the 1840s more than a few shops and hotels occupied the western side of the High Street. The coming of the railway in 1858 also aided in securing the commercial focus of the town on Queen Street.

The Queen Street terraces were identified by Helen Baker (Proudfoot) in the early 1960s as a unique group of two-storey late Georgian vernacular buildings which were considered to form the only surviving late-1840s streetscape within the County of Cumberland. The buildings were acquired by the Cumberland County Council and its successors, the State Planning Authority and Department of Planning, to ensure their preservation.

284–6 were built in the late 1840s by George Fullerton, a doctor whilst 288–290 were built about the same time by blacksmith John Doyle. The shop at 292–4 evolved from a small stone two storey structure to a large stone building and was built about the same time as the two previous buildings. It housed the shop of William Bursill, auctioneer. 298 Coaching House has a sturdy verandah, supported by cast iron Ionic columns. The central opening on the ground floor closed by wooden gates indicates an entrance to the stables that were at its rear (Carroll, 1983, 35-36).

=== Old Railway Hotel (288–290 Queen Street) ===
Created by the subdivision of the Bradbury Park Estate, the plot was the southern half of Lot 22, owned by Mary and George Cannon. In October 1844, Mary and George Cannon sold the land to John Hilt, a coachman from Sydney for £30. In August 1845 John Hilt sold his land to John Doyle, blacksmith and wheelwright of Campbelltown and at this time there was no evidence of buildings. Doyle and his family owned the land until 1908

Between the years of 1844 and 1856 the Doyle family built a two-storey building, and in 1856 it was first licensed by the licensee Sylvester Byrne who has transferred the license from The Sportsman's Arms in Campbelltown. It was documented that Byrne rented from Doyle. He however became bankrupt so could no longer rent the building.

At this stage the building contained a bar, two parlours, a dining room, three bedrooms, smaller room with bed and a well equipped kitchen. Doyle took over the license of Byrne, and the hotel was later run by Thomas James who during his management converted the wooden coach house into a music and dance hall.

After Doyle died he passed the estate on to his children, and in 1896 it was still known as Doyles Railway Hotel. In 1896 and extensive collection of out buildings were constructed. A coach builder operated from the premises. They may have also been used by the Doyle brothers who operated businesses of both blacksmiths and undertakers during the 1890s.

Nicholas Doyle (John Doyle's son) died in 1907 and his sister Annie Doyle sold the property and others to Edwin and William Fieldhouse, storekeepers in 1908. They had various mortgages over Doyle's property since 1904, and had not been repaid.

Between 1908 and 1921 the hotel is possibly let to various occupants.

In 1921 it was sold to Cecilia and Henry Meredith.

In 1943 sold to Mr. J. L. Froggatt who renamed the building Bonito; the building then became Bonito Flats and divided for residential accommodation.

=== Legacy House (Bursill's Shop) (292–294 Queen Street) ===
The land was originally lot 23 of the Bradbury Park Estate. In October 1844, Mary and George Cannon and their mortgage holder John Smith sold this block of land consisting of 1 rood 24 perches and for the purchase price of £45 to William Bursill, an auctioneer from Campbelltown.

The shop at 292–294 evolved from a small stone two storey structure to a large stone building. William Bursill in the 1840s was able to afford to construct a substantial building considering that during this time the depression was affecting the majority of Australia. From this building Bursill ran a tannery in conjunction with a boot shop.

Bursill sold his portion of the land to the Campbelltown postmaster William Fowler in October 1850. The selling price increased from £45 to £375 in the space of six years. This demonstrates how substantial the buildings on the land were. It is also suggested that Fowler rented the buildings for a period between 1846 and when he purchased it, using it for the Post Office.

In 1879 the post office was taken over by Fowler's sons and at this time Fowler also offered to sell the building which consisted of 46-centimetre (18 in) thick stone walls, a ground floor shop with four rooms and another six rooms upstairs. There was a separate kitchen and pantry and storeroom in brick and stone, and outside there was a stable and coach house. The selling price in 1879 was £1,450.

In 1881 the store was sold for a price of £1,050 with a mortgage of £550 to Joseph Atkinson, an innkeeper. Atkinson was one of the first aldermen elected to Campbelltown Council (established 1882). A ten-room shop and residence was occupied by S. Fisher and had a value of £50 per annum on the premises and a smaller three room shop valued at £50 per annum was occupied by W. Price.

By October 1886, Joseph Atkinson had become a publican at Windsor, and the premises were sold to James Wilson a butcher for £675, there had been no changes to the block.

James Wilson (Scottish) was partners in business with Daniel Fowler (son in law of Bursill). Wilson owned other land in Campbelltown.

The 1891 Census showed the householder as Thomas Gamble, it also indicated the building was the store and home of Gamble. Thomas Gamble was also the Mayor of Campbelltown in 1895.

James Wilson died in 1912 and the estate was left to his widow Helen.

The premises were given in 1912 by Helen Wilson to George Chinnocks, storekeeper for ten shillings.

Chinnocks had been a butcher in Campbelltown in the 1890s end expanded to a general store keeper by 1912. The building at the time was called Stanwell House and known also as Chinnocks Newsagency. Chinnocks died in 1938.

The building was inherited by Georgina Highfield née Campbell and her son Norman and electrician. The ownership title was confirmed in 1946.

The estate was sold to the State Planning Authority in 1964 for £12,000. In 1969 architect John Fisher (member of the Institute of Architects, the Cumberland County Council Historic Buildings Committee and on the first Council of the National Trust of Australia (NSW) after its reformation in 1960) was commissioned by the State Planning Authority to restore the first five houses in Campbelltown, which had been resumed under the Cumberland County Planning Scheme. They included Glenalvon House.

The property is now leased to Legacy.

=== Historic themes ===
- Australian Theme: 3-Developing local, regional and national economies
- State Theme: Commerce
- Local Theme: Activities relating to buying, selling and exchanging goods and services
- Australian Theme State: 3-Developing local regional and national economies
- State Theme: Communication
- Local Theme: Activities relating to the creation and conveyance of information
- Australian Theme State: 4-Buildings settlements, towns and cities
- State Theme: Towns, suburbs and villages
- Local Theme: Activities associated with creating planning and managing urban functions, landscapes and lifestyles in towns and villages
- Australian Theme State: 4-Buildings, settlements, towns and cities
- State Theme: Accommodation
- Local Theme: Activities associated with the provision of accommodation, and particular types of accommodation

== Description ==
=== Old Railway Hotel ===
- Builder: John Doyle
- Construction Years: 1844–1856

Physical description

The dimensions of the land are 61 perches commencing at a point in the High Street 77 feet 3 ins n-e from the n-e corner of Lot 23 purchased by William Bursill; bounded on the n-e by a line leading s-e 3 chains 45 links; on s-e by Lot 21 purchased by Ezekiel Wells a line bearing s-w 75 feet; on s-w by Lot 23 (Bursill) being a line bearing n-w to the High Street; on n-w by that street bearing n-e 77 feet and 3 ins to commencement.

It is a Victorian Georgian style building, made of stone and is two storeys high.

The building has Georgian style windows and doors, with fanlights above the exterior front doors. There are four Georgian fireplaces on the ground floor with two more on the first floor. The building has early boarded ceilings, but also some rooms have exposed ceilings with the joists showing. It has plaster and stud walls with Georgian skirting around the floors and windows.

The rear of the property contains early additions of slab and shingle sheds, and there are other later designed structures form weather board and timber.

The building was acquired by the NSW Planning & Environment Commission and restoration of the building commenced in 1971 by Fisher, Jackson and Hudson.

- Current Use: Doctors Surgery
- Former Use: Hotel

=== Old William Bursill's Shop, Legacy House ===
- Builder: William Bursill
- Construction Years: 1840s

Physical description

The dimensions of the land were 1 road 24 perches part of Joseph Phelps 140acres bounded on the n-w at a point on the s-e side of high street 2 chains 65 links s-w from its junction with Allman Street; by the High Street bearing s-w 1 chain and 32 links on the s-w by a line bounding Lot 24 bearing s-e 3 chains and 10 links; on the s-e by a line bearing n-e 1 chain and 32 links; on the n-w by the boundary of Lot 22 bearing n-w 3 chains and 20 links to point of commencement.

It is a Victorian Georgian style two storey building and is made from stone. It has typical Georgian doors and windows, a traditional Victorian shop front, with early stone thresholds. It also has early doors and linings around the doors and windows. The floor is early stone with some early and some modern skirtings. There is a lot of early glass still remaining in the windows on the first floor. There are also stud walls, and early glazed doors. The rear room contains shingle battens and the early floor and roof structure remains.

With the building being vacant for some time, it has been vandalized, resulting in rear openings being boarded up. The stone at the rear of the building shows the mortar joints made from seashells, and there is evidence of limewash.

Restoration was undertaken by architect Morton Herman and during the restoration part of William Bursill's old shop sign was uncovered.

- Current Use: Leased to Legacy
- Former Use: Shop and residence

Description: Coaching House: Dating to the 1840s, a pair of two-storey townhouses, separated by a wide coach drive off Queen Street. The central opening on the ground floor boasts two large timber gates, which were opened to allow horse-drawn vehicles access to the stables that once stood at the rear of the building. Cast iron Ionic columns support the sturdy verandah. Morton Herman restored the building in 1964.

== Heritage listing ==
The Queen Street Buildings are among the earliest buildings surviving in Campbelltown, which was one of the first centres of population to be established outside of Sydney. The buildings were owned and used by many families who played a leading role in the foundations and development of Campbelltown during the 19th Century.

The buildings retain a good deal of evidence about the way of life at the time they were constructed, the buildings were one of the first instances of the State Government buying privately owned property for the purpose of conservation. The Cumberland County Council purchased them in 1963, and was seen as a landmark movement in the history of the conservation movement in NSW. The Buildings were also among the first to be given an A classification by the National Trust.

Of the remaining Georgian design building left in Australia, even fewer are of the standard which is seen in the Queen Street terraces, they are examples of commercial and domestic buildings from the 19th Century.

Queen Street Buildings was listed on the New South Wales State Heritage Register on 2 April 1999 having satisfied the following criteria.

The place is important in demonstrating the course, or pattern, of cultural or natural history in New South Wales.

Queen Street terraces 288–294 are significant because together they constitute one of the very few relatively intact Georgian Style townscapes in NSW.

The buildings were occupied by several families who were intimately connected with the development of Campbelltown during the 19th Century.

They occupy a section of Queen Street which became the focus of commercial town life following the subdivision of the Bradbury Estate in the 1840s.

These buildings are believed to be among the first to be acquired and restored by the NSW Government for the purpose of conserving the states environmental heritage, and therefore represent an impact landmark in the history of conservation.

The place is important in demonstrating aesthetic characteristics and/or a high degree of creative or technical achievement in New South Wales.

The buildings retain much of the fabric of the major phases of development since their construction in the mid 19th Century including several outbuildings and archaeological relics.

The buildings and site are physical reminders of the history of the town of Campbelltown.

The Queen Street historic precinct makes an important contribution to the quality of the streetscape of Campbelltown.

The site is a valuable archaeological resource with potential to add to existing knowledge about early life in Campbelltown.
