= Warbys Barn and Stables =

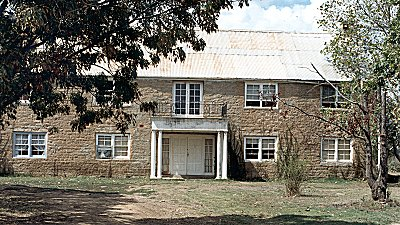
- Front view

- Location within Sydney Location within Australia
- 34°03′30″S 150°49′25″E
- Location: 14–20 Queen Street, Campbelltown, City of Campbelltown, New South Wales, Australia

History
- Built: 1816

Site notes
- Architect: John Warby

New South Wales Heritage Register
- Official name: Warbys Barn & Warbys Stables; The Leumeah Barn; Leumeah Barn Restaurant; Campbelltown Motor Inn
- Type: State heritage (built)
- Designated: 2 April 1999
- Reference no.: 497
- Type: Stables
- Category: Farming and Grazing

Warbys Barn and Stables is a heritage-listed former barns and now commercial building at 14–20 Queen Street, Campbelltown in the City of Campbelltown local government area of New South Wales, Australia. It was designed by John Warby and built in 1816. It is also known as Warbys Barn and Warbys Stables, The Leumeah Barn, Leumeah Barn Restaurant and Campbelltown Motor Inn. It was added to the New South Wales State Heritage Register on 2 April 1999.

== History ==
=== Campbelltown ===
Permanent European settlement in the Campbelltown area had begun in 1809 as an alternative to the flood-prone Hawkesbury district. Work on a road from Sydney to Liverpool was started in 1811. It was opened in August 1814 and was soon extended further south to Appin. This road, variously known as Campbelltown Road, Appin Road or the Sydney Road, passed through Campbelltown. The section through the town was called the High Street until the last decade of the 19th century when it was renamed Queen Street.

The land on which the Queen Street cottages stand was part of a grant of 57 hectares (140 acres) to Joseph Phelps in 1816. He had been working the land for some years before receiving formal title to it. Phelps was one of the farmers of Airds and Appin who subscribed funds for a Sydney courthouse in July 1813. His grant was seized, possibly as soon as it was formally issued, by the provost marshal, William Gore, in lieu of payment by Phelps of debts totalling 170 pounds. The land was auctioned in January 1817 to William Bradbury for 100 pounds plus twelve cattle and the grain produced from the crop growing on the land.

Immediately north of Phelps' grant, Assistant Surveyor James Meehan had informally reserved 71 hectares (175 acres) for a village (AMCG, 1994 say "in 1815".) In 1816 most of the land in the area was granted, leaving a portion of 71 hectares (175 acres) unalienated, and surrounded by several grants.

The reserved land was formally declared a town by Governor Macquarie in December 1820 and named Campbelltown in honour of his wife (Elizabeth)'s family.

William Bradbury (1774–1836) a native of Birmingham, was transported to NSW aboard the "Guildford" in 1812. His wife Elizabeth remained in England but his daughter, Mary (1797–1852) followed her father to Australia in 1815. Bradbury had no other children in NSW, though he established a relationship with a woman named Alice and in April 1836 married a Campbelltown widow, Catherine Patrick, née Acres (c.1801–1883). Bradbury died two months later.

Governor Macquarie visited Campbelltown in January 1822. He and his party ate a "hearty" breakfast at 'Bradbury's', indicating that Bradbury had built an inn. This was probably the inn later known as the Royal Oak, on the western side of the High Street. Macquarie noted in his journal that 'Bradbury is building a very good two storey brick house on his own farm and on a very pretty eminence immediately adjoining Campbell-Town as an inn for the accommodation of the public, and having asked me to give his farm a name, I have called it Bradbury Park. In 1826 Bradbury Park House was considered by William Dumaresq, inspector of roads and bridges, as the best building in Campbelltown when he reported on buildings suitable for military use.

As the main street of Campbelltown, High Street or Sydney Road and later Queen Street, was at the edge of town, one side of the street was not within the town boundary while the other was. Canny traders soon realised that either side of the main road was as good as the other and leased or bought land from the grantees bordering the town proper. By the 1840s more than a few shops and hotels occupied the western side of the High Street. The coming of the railway in 1858 also aided in securing the commercial focus of the town on Queen Street.

The Queen Street terraces were identified by Helen Baker (Proudfoot) in the early 1960s as a unique group of two-storey late Georgian vernacular buildings which were considered to form the only surviving late-1840s streetscape within the County of Cumberland. The buildings were acquired by the Cumberland County Council and its successors, the State Planning Authority and Department of Planning, to ensure their preservation.

=== Warby's Barn ===
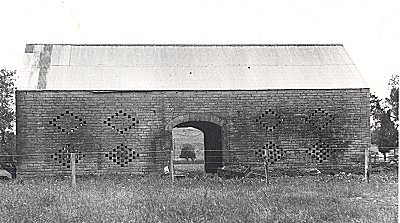
The barn, before its conversion into flats

John Warby (1744?–1851), a convict, explorer and later farmer was convicted at Hertford England on 3 March 1791 and sentenced to transportation for seven years. He reached Sydney in February 1792 in the ship, "Pitt". On 12 September 1796 he married another convict, Sarah Bentley (1780–1869) who had arrived in the Indispensable in April 1796 at Parramatta. They had nine sons and five daughters. One of the sons, John Warby was the first settler in the North Gundagai area.

Warby settled on 20 hectares (50 acres) at Prospect after his sentence expired. In 1803 he was appointed stockman of the wild cattle at large in the Cowpastures.

Warby became well known as an explorer and guide in the Camden area and Burragorang Valley, leading Governor Macquarie and his party from Prospect Hill through the Cowpastures in November 1810 and again in October 1815 on an expedition along the Nattai River.

In June 1816 and at the age of 49, he was rewarded for his public services with a grant of 105 hectares (260 acres) at Campbelltown. In the same year Warby built the first three rooms of Leumeah House, the stables and the barn. Further work to the main house using sandstock bricks was subsequently done in 1826. At one time there were no less than 40 servants housed in the stables to service the needs of the Warby establishment, At age 84 John Warby died on 12 June 1851. Sarah Warby lived on at Campbelltown and died there on 19 October 1869.

Leumeah House was demolished in 1963, but the barn and stables associated with the farmstead survived.

In 1962 Mr John Feeney purchased The Leumeah Barn (Warby's Barn) and Warbys Stables which were now in a derelict condition. Feeney restored and renovated the building converting it into a residence. In completing the work care was taken not to alter the exterior of the building and to retain many of the original features such as the fireplace, half log roof beams, the carriage arch and the window and door openings.

In 1979 Feeney sold the property and the barn was converted into a block of flats and the stables into a restaurant called Sids Leumeah Barn Restaurant.

During 1985 the Heritage Council received community strong representation expressing concern for the future of Warby's Barn and Warby's Stable. On 24 March 1985 the Heritage Council recommended the placing of an Interim Heritage Order over Warby's Barn and Warby's Stable. An Interim Heritage Order was placed on 31 May 1985. The order was placed to provide time for further inquiry and investigation to determine whether it was necessary to warrant the making of a Permanent Conservation Order.

On 26 June 1985 the Heritage Council approved, subject to conditions, the conversion of Warby's Barn to a Motor Inn.

On 25 November 1986 the Heritage Council recommended placing a Permanent Conservation order over Warby's Barn and Warby's Stable. Public notice was given of the proposal to place a Permanent Conservation Order. The Heritage Council received an objection to the extent of the listing.

To ensure continued protection a second Interim Conservation Order was placed 22 May 1987. Following discussion with the owner of Warby's Barn and Warby's Stable an adjustment to the proposed boundary of the Permanent Conservation Order was made. The objection to the Permanent Conservation Order was subsequently withdrawn.

The Permanent Conservation order was placed on 22 January 1988. Warby's Barn and Warby's Stable was listed on the State Heritage Register on 2 April 1999.

By 2011 after being empty for a number of years Warbys Barn was converted into a health centre.

== Description ==
Both buildings are simple sandstone structures rectangular in shape with gable roofs. The barn had large central arched openings in front and rear and symmetrically placed patterned ventilation gaps in the stonework. These have been removed through the insertion of windows and doorways. The stables are less altered. Porches have been added to both buildings.

=== Condition ===
As at 14 March 2001, archaeological potential is high.

== Heritage listing ==
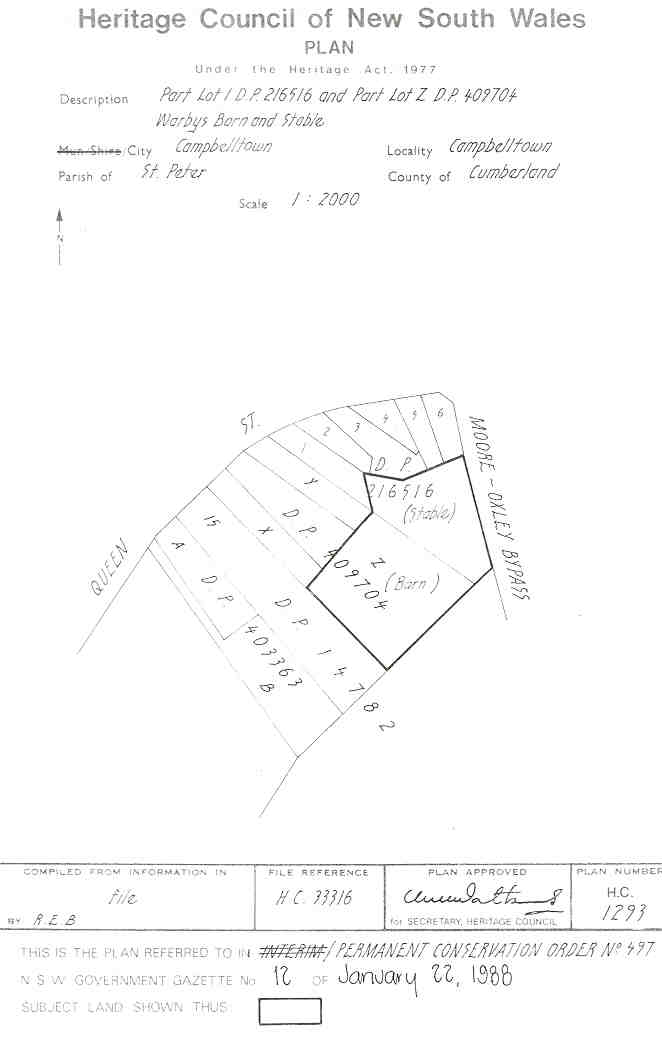
Heritage boundaries

As at 22 October 2012, the Leumeah Barn (Warby's Barn) and Warby's Stable are significant remains of one of the earliest farms of the Campbelltown district. Their strong historical associations with the district's evolution and settlement pattern are reinforced by their location within a suburb names after Leumeah House.

Warbys Barn & Stables was listed on the New South Wales State Heritage Register on 2 April 1999.
