= Campbelltown Post Office =

Campbelltown Post Office (former)
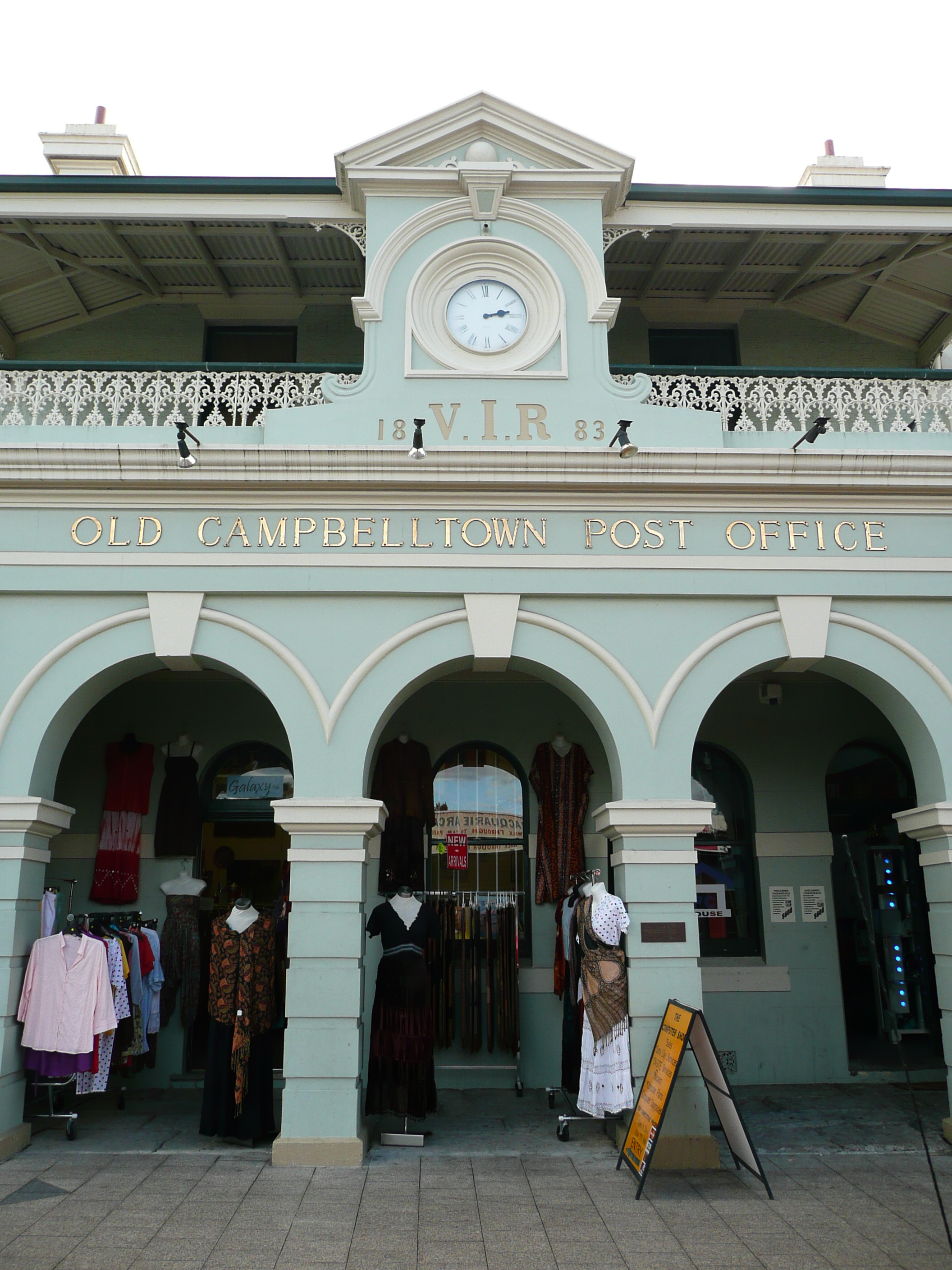
- The former post office, pictured in 2008.

- Location within New South Wales Location within Australia
- 34°04′06″S 150°48′44″E
- Location: 261 Queen Street, Campbelltown, City of Campbelltown, New South Wales, Australia

History
- Built: 1881

Site notes
- Architect: James Barnet
- Architectural style: Victorian Italianate

New South Wales Heritage Register
- Official name: Campbelltown Post Office (former); Campbelltown Post Office
- Type: State heritage (built)
- Designated: 2 April 1999
- Reference no.: 265
- Type: Post Office
- Category: Postal and Telecommunications

The Campbelltown Post Office is a heritage-listed former post office and now shops and office space at 261 Queen Street, Campbelltown, New South Wales, a suburb of Sydney, Australia. It was designed by James Barnet and built in 1881. It is also known as Campbelltown Post Office (former). The property is privately owned. It was added to the New South Wales State Heritage Register on 2 April 1999.

== History ==
Permanent European settlement in the Campbelltown area had begun in 1809 as an alternative to the flood-prone Hawkesbury district. Work on a road from Sydney to Liverpool was started in 1811. It was opened in August 1814 and was soon extended further south to Appin. This road, variously known as Campbelltown Road, Appin Road or the Sydney Road, passed through Campbelltown. The section through the town was called the High Street until the last decade of the 19th century when it was renamed Queen Street.

The land on which the Queen Street cottages stand was part of a grant of 57 hectares (140 acres) to Joseph Phelps in 1816. He had been working the land for some years before receiving formal title to it. Phelps was one of the farmers of Airds and Appin who subscribed funds for a Sydney courthouse in July 1813. His grant was seized, possibly as soon as it was formally issued, by the provost marshal, William Gore, in lieu of payment by Phelps of debts totalling £170. The land was auctioned in January 1817 to William Bradbury for £100 plus twelve cattle and the grain produced from the crop growing on the land.

Immediately north of Phelps' grant, Assistant Surveyor James Meehan had informally reserved 71 hectares (175 acres) for a village. In 1816 most of the land in the area was granted, leaving a portion of 175 acres unalienated, and surrounded by several grants.

The reserved land was formally declared a town by Governor Macquarie in December 1820 and named Campbelltown in honour of his wife (Elizabeth)'s family.

William Bradbury (1774-1836) a native of Birmingham, was transported to NSW aboard the Guildford in 1812. His wife Elizabeth remained in England but his daughter, Mary (1797-1852) followed her father to Australia in 1815. Bradbury had no other children in NSW, though he established a relationship with a woman named Alice and in April 1836 married a Campbelltown widow, Catherine Patrick, née Acres (c. 1801-1883). Bradbury died two months later.

Governor Macquarie visited Campbelltown in January 1822. He and his party ate a "hearty" breakfast at 'Bradbury's', indicating that Bradbury had built an inn. This was probably the inn later known as the Royal Oak, on the western side of the High Street. Macquarie noted in his journal that 'Bradbury is building a very good two storey brick house on his own farm and on a very pretty eminence immediately adjoining Campbell-Town as an inn for the accommodation of the public, and having asked me to give his farm a name, I have called it Bradbury Park. In 1826 Bradbury Park House was considered by William Dumaresq, inspector of roads and bridges, as the best building in Campbelltown when he reported on buildings suitable for military use.

As the main street of Campbelltown, High Street or Sydney Road and later Queen Street, was at the edge of town, one side of the street was not within the town boundary while the other was. Canny traders soon realised that either side of the main road was as good as the other and leased or bought land from the grantees bordering the town proper. By the 1840s more than a few shops and hotels occupied the western side of the High Street. The coming of the railway in 1858 also aided in securing the commercial focus of the town on Queen Street.

The Queen Street terraces were identified by Helen Baker (Proudfoot) in the early 1960s as a unique group of two-storey late Georgian vernacular buildings which were considered to form the only surviving late-1840s streetscape within the County of Cumberland. The buildings were acquired by the Cumberland County Council and its successors, the State Planning Authority and Department of Planning, to ensure their preservation.

=== Campbelltown Post Office (former) ===
The Commercial Banking Company (CBC) of Sydney opened its first (leased) Campbelltown office in 1874, across the other side of Queen Street. AMCG (1994, 14) states that CBC bought 263 Queen Street from Samuel Parker (not Morris) in 1876 and had the present bank building built in 1881. The bank moved into its new premises in 1881.

The bank sold a portion of the land it bought from Parker in 1880. The land was purchased in the name of the Queen for a new post office. That building was completed the same year as the CBC chambers.

Campbellttown was one of the seven first country postal depots in New South Wales., with postmaster John Scarr appointed in 1828. Constructed in 1881 and designed by James Barnet. A small central pedimented panel containing a clock, designed by local architect A. R. Payten was inserted in 1883.

In 1959 the bank sold off another portion of its 1876 purchase to the Commonwealth of Australia, presumably for the creation of a telephone exchange.

Following the sale of the Post Office and as a requirement of the sale, the Commonwealth Government sought the placement of a Permanent Conservation Order over the building. A Permanent Conservation Order was placed over the building on 22 July 1983. It was transferred to the State Heritage Register on 2 April 1999.

== Description ==
The former Post office is a two storied rendered brick classical revival building, with three semi-circular arches in the front bay facade under the front verandah. Victorian Italianate style balcony and clock added 1893 by A. R. Payten the small two storey building has a three-arch arcade at ground level and verandah above, with a small central pedimented panel containing a clock, reputedly designed by local architect A. R. payten and inserted in 1883. It is adjoined by a small single storey block with a typical 19th century verandah. There is a single storey wing on the north side of the building.

=== Modifications and dates ===
- 1881 – constructed
- 1883 – new first floor verandah and clock added
- post 1915 – new verandah to single storey
- 6 April 1987 – Heritage Council approval for enclosure and outdoor eating area subject to conditions.
- 14 October 1994 – Heritage Council approval for re-fit of restaurant.
- 11 May 2006 – Heritage Council approval for demolition of existing steel structure and construction of new structure and use of cafe.

== Heritage listing ==
As at 7 July 2008, Campbelltown Post Office has historical significance as one of the seven first country postal depots in New South Wales, with postmaster John Scarr appointed in 1828. Design by James Barnet and constructed in 1881 in the Italianate style it is a significant building in the Campbelltown streetscape and is a good example of a small country town post office.

Campbelltown Post Office was listed on the New South Wales State Heritage Register on 2 April 1999 having satisfied the following criteria.

The place is important in demonstrating aesthetic characteristics and/or a high degree of creative or technical achievement in New South Wales.

The Post Office makes an important contribution to the streetscape of Queen Street, Campbelltown.

== See also ==
- Australian non-residential architectural styles
