= Dredges Cottage =

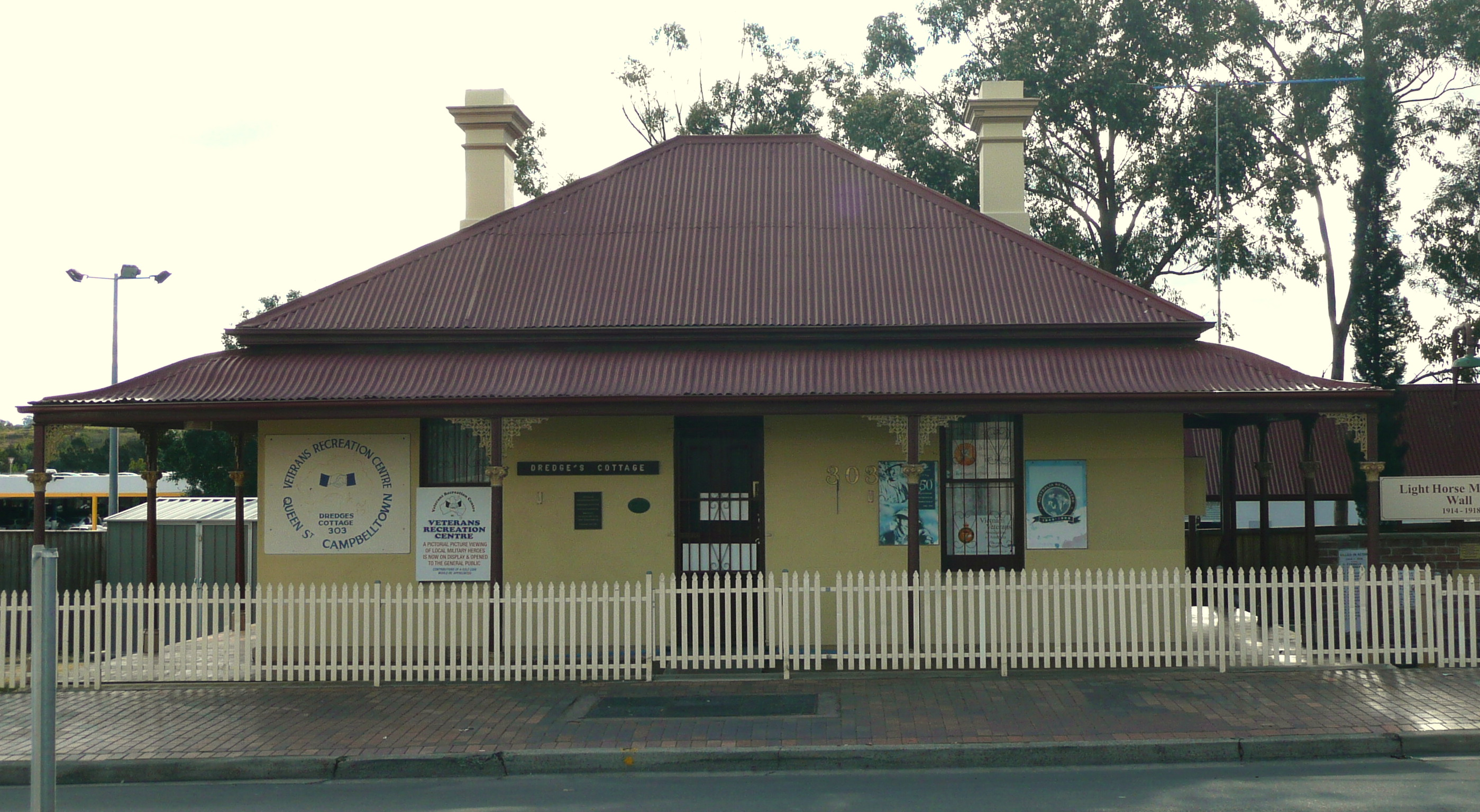
- Dredges Cottage, pictured in 2008.

- Location within Sydney Location within Australia
- 34°04′12″S 150°48′39″E
- Location: 303 Queen Street, Campbelltown, City of Campbelltown, New South Wales, Australia

Site notes
- Owner: Campbelltown City Council

New South Wales Heritage Register
- Official name: Dredges Cottage
- Type: State heritage (built)
- Designated: 2 April 1999
- Reference no.: 640
- Type: Cottage
- Category: Residential buildings (private)

Dredges Cottage is a heritage-listed former cottage and now office located at 303 Queen Street, Campbelltown, New South Wales, an outer suburb of Sydney, Australia. The property is owned by Campbelltown City Council. It was added to the New South Wales State Heritage Register on 2 April 1999.

== History ==
=== Airds ===
Airds was an early name used to describe the entire Campbelltown area. Governor Macquarie, on his first visit in 1810, wrote: 'I intend forming this tract of country into a new and separate district for the accommodation of small settlers, and to name it Airds in honour of my dear good Elizabeth's family estate (in Scotland)'. Airds was widely used at first but as individual local villages came into being, the broad name fell out of use and it wasn't reborn until 1975 when the NSW Housing Commission converted bush farms at "South Kentlyn" into a new housing estate – Airds.

Permanent European settlement in the Campbelltown area had begun in 1809 as an alternative to the flood-prone Hawkesbury district. Work on a road from Sydney to Liverpool was started in 1811. It was opened in August 1814 and was soon extended further south to Appin. This road, variously known as Campbelltown Road, Appin Road or the Sydney Road, passed through Campbelltown. The section through the town was called the High Street until the last decade of the 19th century when it was renamed Queen Street.

The land on which the Queen Street cottages stand was part of a grant of 57 hectares (140 acres) to Joseph Phelps in 1816. He had been working the land for some years before receiving formal title to it. Phelps was one of the farmers of Airds and Appin who subscribed funds for a Sydney courthouse in July 1813. His grant was seized, possibly as soon as it was formally issued, by the provost marshal, William Gore, in lieu of payment by Phelps of debts totalling £170. The land was auctioned in January 1817 to William Bradbury for £100 plus twelve cattle and the grain produced from the crop growing on the land.

Immediately north of Phelps' grant, Assistant Surveyor James Meehan had informally reserved 71 hectares (175 acres) for a village. In 1816 most of the land in the area was granted, leaving a portion of 71 hectares (175 acres) unalienated, and surrounded by several grants.

The reserved land was formally declared a town by Governor Macquarie in December 1820 and named Campbelltown in honour of his wife (Elizabeth)'s family.

William Bradbury (1774–1836) a native of Birmingham, was transported to NSW aboard the Guildford in 1812. His wife Elizabeth remained in England but his daughter, Mary (1797–1852) followed her father to Australia in 1815. Bradbury had no other children in NSW, though he established a relationship with a woman named Alice and in April 1836 married a Campbelltown widow, Catherine Patrick, née Acres (c.1801–1883). Bradbury died two months later.

Governor Macquarie visited Campbelltown in January 1822. He and his party ate a "hearty" breakfast at 'Bradbury's', indicating that Bradbury had built an inn. This was probably the inn later known as the Royal Oak, on the western side of the High Street. Macquarie noted in his journal that 'Bradbury is building a very good two storey brick house on his own farm and on a very pretty eminence immediately adjoining Campbell-Town as an inn for the accommodation of the public, and having asked me to give his farm a name, I have called it Bradbury Park. In 1826 Bradbury Park House was considered by William Dumaresq, inspector of roads and bridges, as the best building in Campbelltown when he reported on buildings suitable for military use.

As the main street of Campbelltown, High Street or Sydney Road and later Queen Street, was at the edge of town, one side of the street was not within the town boundary while the other was. Canny traders soon realised that either side of the main road was as good as the other and leased or bought land from the grantees bordering the town proper. By the 1840s more than a few shops and hotels occupied the western side of the High Street. The coming of the railway in 1858 also aided in securing the commercial focus of the town on Queen Street.

The Queen Street terraces were identified by Helen Baker (Proudfoot) in the early 1960s as a unique group of two-storey late Georgian vernacular buildings which were considered to form the only surviving late-1840s streetscape within the County of Cumberland. The buildings were acquired by the Cumberland County Council and its successors, the State Planning Authority and Department of Planning, to ensure their preservation.

== Heritage listing ==
Dredges Cottage was listed on the New South Wales State Heritage Register on 2 April 1999.

== See also ==
- Australian residential architectural styles
