= Ruse, New South Wales =

Ruse
- Suburb
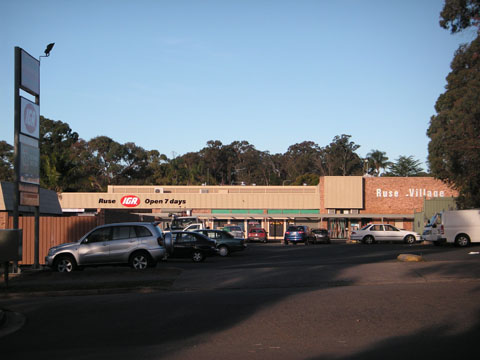
- Ruse Village shops

- Interactive map of Ruse
- Country: Australia
- State: New South Wales
- City: Sydney
- LGA: City of Campbelltown
- Location: 55 km (34 mi) south-west of Sydney

Government
  - State electorate: Campbelltown
  - Federal division: Macarthur
- Elevation: 125 m (410 ft)

Population
  - Total: 5,632 (2021 census)
- Postcode: 2560
Suburbs around Ruse
Leumeah	Leumeah	Kentlyn
Campbelltown	Ruse	Kentlyn
Bradbury	Airds	Kentlyn

Ruse (/ruːs/ ROOSS) is a suburb of Sydney, in the state of New South Wales, Australia. It is 55 kilometres south-west of the Sydney central business district, in the local government area of the City of Campbelltown.

== History ==
Ruse was named after James Ruse, known as Australia's first farmer. Prior to the 1960s, the area was part of Kentlyn and mostly farm and bushland. The area was then declared open for development and turned into a residential housing estate. It was at this time the name Ruse was proclaimed. Other names were suggested, such as Fisher and Marlow, however the mayor of the day overturned these.

== Local infrastructure ==
The main street of Ruse is Junction Road, which contains the small Ruse Village Shopping Centre and Ruse Primary School. Both opened in the late 1970s and the school is notable for its hexagonal buildings. In between is Worrell Park which hosts rugby league matches including lower grade teams from the Western Suburbs Magpies.

== People ==
According to the 2021 census Ruse recorded a population of 5,632. There were higher than average numbers of people who owned their homes outright (34.4%) or were paying them off (44.5%) while the number of renters (19.5%) was almost half the national average. The median family income of $1,797 per week was around the same as the national average ($1,746), as was the median housing loan repayment of $2,000 per month.

== Transport ==
The nearest railway station is Leumeah railway station on the Main Southern railway line.
