= Robin Hood Farm =

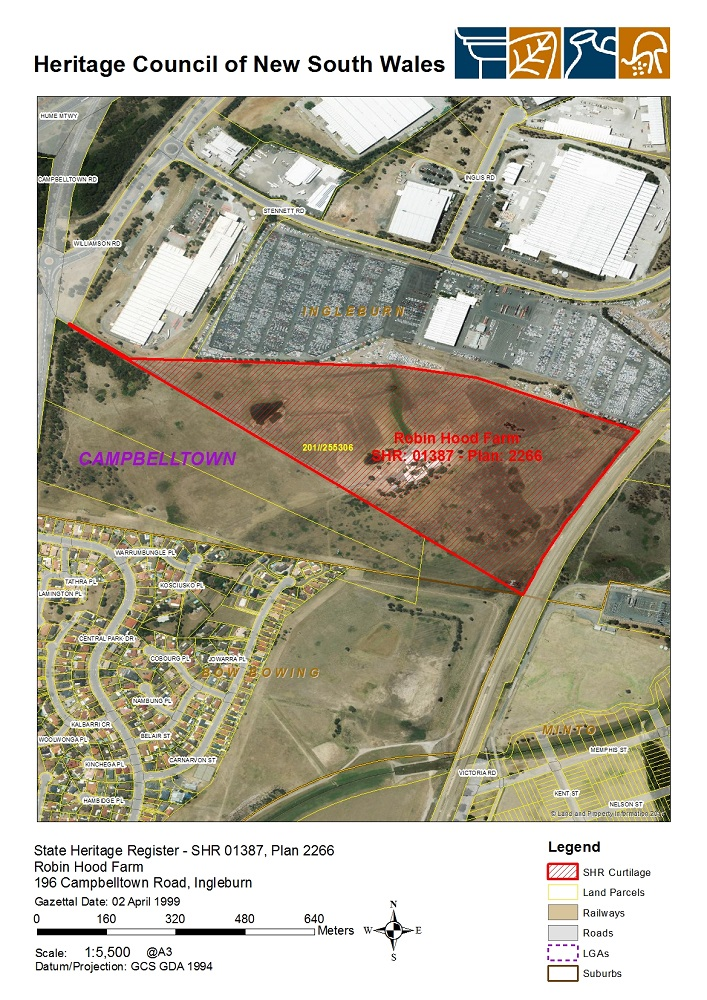
- Heritage boundaries

- Location within New South Wales Location within Australia
- 34°00′39″S 150°50′39″E
- Location: 196 Campbelltown Road, Ingleburn, City of Campbelltown, New South Wales, Australia

History
- Built: 1860–1862

Site notes
- Owner: Department of Planning and Infrastructure

New South Wales Heritage Register
- Official name: Robin Hood Farm; Robin Hood Inn; Waratah Dairies
- Type: State heritage (landscape)
- Designated: 2 April 1999
- Reference no.: 1387
- Type: Farm
- Category: Farming and Grazing
- Builders: Richard Watson

Robin Hood Farm is a heritage-listed former dairy farm homestead and now adolescent drug rehabilitation centre located at 196 Campbelltown Road, Ingleburn, in the City of Campbelltown local government area of New South Wales, Australia. It was built from 1860 to 1862 by Richard Watson. It is also known as Robin Hood Inn and Waratah Dairies. The property is owned by Department of Planning and Infrastructure, a department of the Government of New South Wales. It was added to the New South Wales State Heritage Register on 2 April 1999.

== History ==
Robin Hood Farm is closely associated with the Robin Hood Inn which was established in 1830 on part of the Campbellfields Estate subdivision. Although a number of buildings existed on the Robin Hood Farm estate at this time, no farmhouse as such is recorded. The first license to the inn was issued to Thomas Humphreys in 1830, who was also overseer of a nearby property "Varroville". The Inn's license passed through various hands until 1845 when it was issued to Richard Watson who held it until 1860. It would appear that some time around 1858 Watson had taken up farming, most likely dairying, on the adjacent property which became known as Robin Hood Farm. The coming of the railway may have been a factor in Watson's decision to move from the Inn to the farm.

Watson appears to have left the farm by 1867 and the farm changed hands numerous times until 1912 when Fred Moore, a Campbelltown grazier, purchased the property. Moore purchased many of the surrounding parcels of land which were eventually consolidated into a single land holding of 125 hectares (308 acres), subsequently transferred to his wife, Victoria Moore.

In the early twentieth century both Robin Hood Farm and nearby Varroville Farm were dairies. The Smith Brothers of Concord leased both from W. H. Staniforth of St. Andrews.

The Moores left the farm in 1932 but continued to lease it as a dairy farm until 1959 (1923 Percy, Austin and Arthur Smith (Smith Bros), dairymen of Concord operated dairies at Robin Hood Farm and Varroville until 1958, running their own dairy herd and purchasing milk from local farmers' when Victoria, by then a widow, subdivided and sold most of the land to Frank Wolstenholme Pty Ltd (later Reid Murray Developments Pty Ltd).

The lot containing the farmhouse was sold to Frank Lopresti, a grocer from Lakemba in October 1959.

The farm was acquired by the State Planning Authority in October 1968.

In 1969 architect John Fisher (member of the Institute of Architects, the Cumberland County Council Historic Buildings Committee and on the first Council of the National Trust of Australia (NSW) after its reformation in 1960) was commissioned by the State Planning Authority to restore the first five houses in Campbelltown, which had been resumed under the Cumberland County Planning Scheme. They included Glenalvon House.

== Description ==
A two-storey house of Georgian design, with a distinctive silhouette. The walls of the ground floor rooms fill in the ends of the front verandah forming rooms known as "out-shuts". The roof is galvanised iron, hipped with boxed eaves and a well proportioned chimney at both ends. A striking circular silo stands near the main building. The farmhouse was originally believed to have been built in the 1830s but recent research would suggest that the farm was built some 20–30 years later but after an earlier pattern. The conservation of the building took it back to its original form, stripping away the years of additions. Prior to the building's restoration, the National Trust listing of the building noted that the building contained much original external joinery. The conservation work not only removed the "years of additions," but appears to have removed some of the original joinery and the original wooden columns to the front verandah.

Apart from the farmhouse there are few remaining building elements from the original farm complex left. These include a brick silo, with conical corrugated iron roof that is in urgent need of stabilisation, and the remnants of the Dairy, including a brick cool room with original door, which has been altered to dormitory and office accommodation. There is a narrow gauge rail line set in the cement floor of the dairy which was probably used for transporting large feed bins from one end of the dairy to the other.

=== Condition ===
As at 28 January 1999, the house is in excellent condition, however, the remnants of the barn structure need to be examined before any further changes are carried out. The silo is in poor condition and needs urgent stabilisation.

The main building has been extensively conserved. The exterior can be considered to be intact in its substantially original form whilst the interior can be considered to be intact in layout and partially intact in fitout.

=== Modifications and dates ===
Conversion of site to Odyssey House – c. 1989, following conservation works under the guidance of Howard Tanner.

=== Further information ===
A conservation plan for the site was prepared in 1988. As ten years have elapsed since this study was undertaken, it is recommended that the study be updated. The updated plan should address the impact of the "conservation works" on the significant fabric of the building and the impact of the demolition of the barn on the site's overall significance.

== Heritage listing ==
As at 30 March 2000, Robin Hood Farm has high significance as a surviving mid-nineteenth-century farm house. It has a distinctive layout and configuration not represented by other buildings in the area. Together with the surviving villas and farmhouses between Liverpool and Campbelltown, Robin Hood Farm demonstrates the variety of agricultural uses of the area and the use of the area as a rural retreat from the earliest days of white settlement. It provides evidence of the changing use and altered intensity of occupation of the area and particularly the shift from cereal cropping to dairying.

Robin Hood Farm was listed on the New South Wales State Heritage Register on 2 April 1999 having satisfied the following criteria.

The place is important in demonstrating the course, or pattern, of cultural or natural history in New South Wales.

Robin Hood Farm is of historical significance as a rare surviving early dairy farm. It is of further significance for its association with Robin Hood Inn, one of the earliest social institutions in the district and for its association with Robert Watson, an early settler and pastoralist in the area.

The place is important in demonstrating aesthetic characteristics and/or a high degree of creative or technical achievement in New South Wales.

Robin Hood Farm has high aesthetic significance as an unusually designed and well detailed early farmhouse building associated with early dairy farming activities in the Campbelltown district. The associated out buildings, in particular the silo, are also of high aesthetic significance.

The place has a strong or special association with a particular community or cultural group in New South Wales for social, cultural or spiritual reasons.

Robin Hood Farm has high social significance through its links to early settlement and pastoral activities in the Campbelltown district. It has further social significance for its association with the Watson family, a prominent local family and for its association with the Robin Hood Inn, one of the earliest social institutions in the district.

The place has potential to yield information that will contribute to an understanding of the cultural or natural history of New South Wales.

Robin Hood Farm is of high technical/research significance for its demonstration of mid-nineteenth-century building techniques. It is of further significance for its demonstration of early farming and dairying techniques as represented by the extant outbuildings and silo.

The place possesses uncommon, rare or endangered aspects of the cultural or natural history of New South Wales.

Robin Hood Farm is one of few surviving mid-nineteenth-century dairy farms both in the Campbelltown district and the wider Sydney Metropolitan region.

The place is important in demonstrating the principal characteristics of a class of cultural or natural places/environments in New South Wales.

Robin Hood Farm is an excellent example of a mid-nineteenth-century farmhouse and dairy farm.

== See also ==
- Australian residential architectural styles
