= St John's Catholic Church, Campbelltown =

St John's Church
- St John the Evangelist Church, Campbelltown
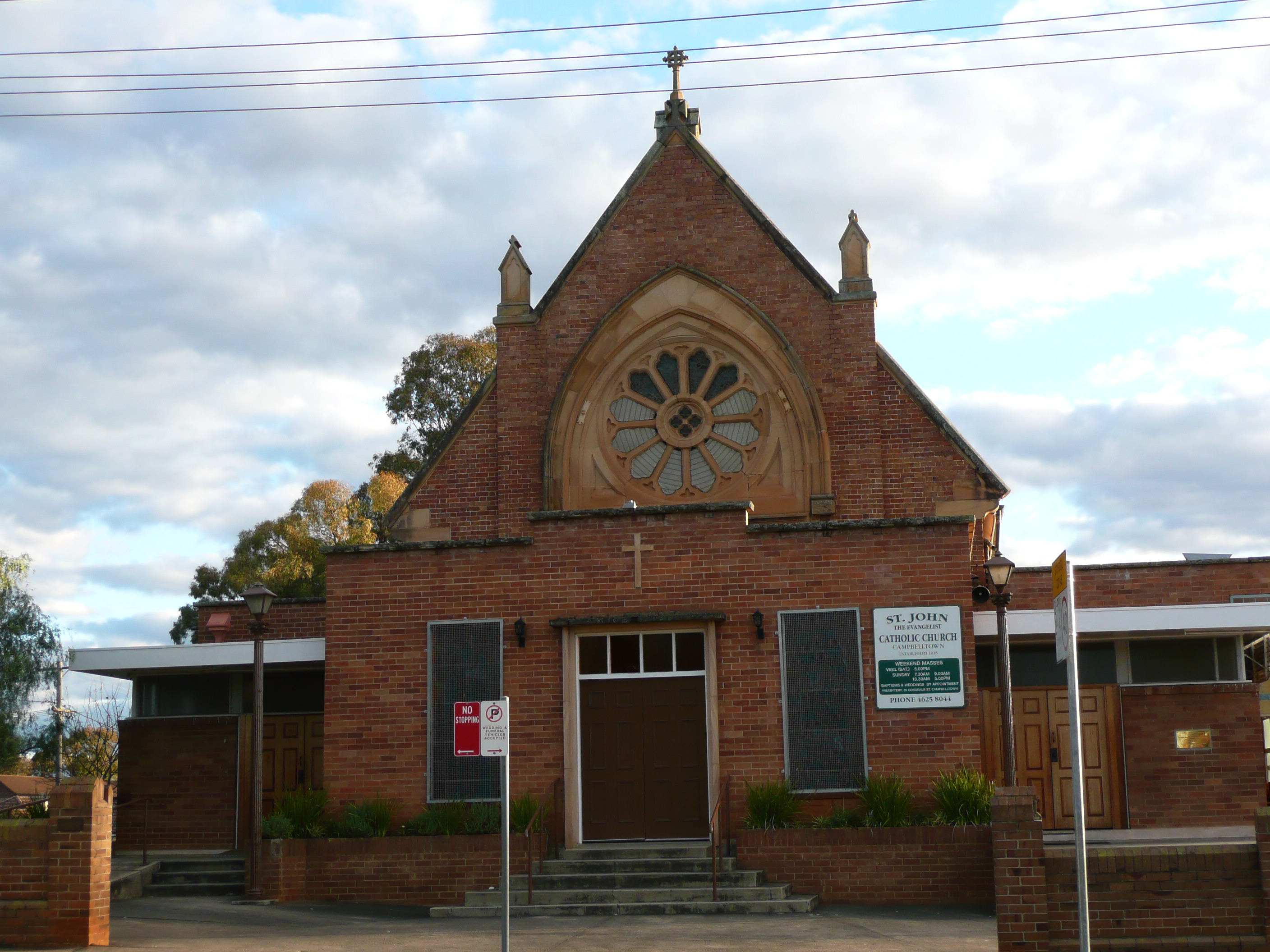
- St John's Church, Campbelltown in 2008

- Location in greater metropolitan Sydney
- 34°04′20″S 150°49′22″E
- Location: 35 Cordeaux Street, Campbelltown, City of Campbelltown, New South Wales
- Country: Australia
- Denomination: Catholic
- Website: sjec.org.au

History
- Status: Church
- Founded: 12 December 1824
- Founder: John Joseph Therry
- Dedication: Saint John the Evangelist

Architecture
- Functional status: Active
- Architect: John Therry
- Architectural type: Church
- Style: Victorian Georgian
- Years built: 1824–1841

Specifications
- Materials: Brick

Administration
- Diocese: Wollongong
- Parish: Campbelltown

Clergy
- Priest: John Ho

New South Wales Heritage Register
- Official name: St Johns Roman Catholic Church and Cemetery (former); Saint Johns Roman Catholic Church; St John the Evangelist Church
- Type: State heritage (built)
- Designated: 2 April 1999
- Reference no.: 193
- Type: Church
- Category: Religion

St John's Roman Catholic Church and Cemetery is a heritage-listed former school and now Roman Catholic church building located in George Street in Campbelltown. It was designed by John Joseph Therry and built from 1824 to 1841. It is also known as St Johns Roman Catholic Church and Cemetery (former), Saint Johns Roman Catholic Church and Old St John's Church. It was added to the New South Wales State Heritage Register on 2 April 1999. The current church, called St John the Evangelist Catholic Church was built in 1886 and is located at Cordeaux Street, Campbelltown in the City of Campbelltown local government area of New South Wales, Australia. The property is owned by Trustees of the Roman Catholic Church for the Diocese of Wollongong.

== History ==
The foundation stone of St John's Roman Catholic Church was laid on 12 December 1824. The Sydney Gazette dated 16 June 1825 announced that Father Therry acknowledged the gift of two hectares (five acres) of land at Campbelltown from James Bourke for a chapel, schoolhouse, and burial ground.

Father John Joseph Therry arrived in Sydney with Father Philip Connolly on 5 May 1820 on board the ship Janus. After his ordination to the priesthood in 1815, Father Therry worked in Dublin and it was there that he was prompted to volunteer for the penal colony of New South Wales after experiencing the trials and tribulations of Irish convicts bound for Sydney. In September 1819 Bishop Slater commissioned father Therry and Father Connolly to work throughout the whole of New Holland and Van Dieman's Land. The civil authorities authorized Governor Macquarie to pay both me an allowance of A£100 per annum. The two priests quickly settled areas of influence in the new colony and Father Connolly set sail for Hobart. Father Therry found himself frequently in Parramatta, Liverpool and the district known as Airds.

For the next ten years, Campbelltown Catholics struggled to raise funds for the completion of St. John's Church. Early records are dotted with references of meeting to finance the project. The Catholic Community gathered at local public houses such as Cullen's Inn and the Forbes Hotel to mound fundraising campaigns. That part of the Bourke gift devoted to the cemetery was consecrated on 27 December 1826.

It was at this time that Father Therry fell foul of the government authorities and Governor Darling withdrew his allowance from 24 June 1826. Funds seemed to be short throughout the Catholic community and little happened in the completion of St. John's Church until early in 1833 when Roger Therry advised Father Therry that some Government financial assistance would be available for the Church completion. Governor Darling had assured Roger Therry that the Home Government was agreeable to advance funds equal to those subscribed by the local community.

It seems that at this time work had progressed on the walls to a height of a single story. In July 1833 William McNally agreed to complete the stonework on the walls and in December of that year, William Broker tendered and was engaged for the shingling and completion of the Church roof. David Lee and Patrick Bleaney agreed to complete the floor, doors, and sashes and to glaze the windows for 388 pounds.

In a despatch to Lord Stanley, 30 September 1833, Governor Bourke wrote:

"The sum of 400 pounds has been appropriated to be paid in the next year in aid of a similar sum to be raised by private subscription for erecting Roman Catholic Chapels at Maitland and Campbelltown. A chapel was begun at the latter place as well as at Parramatta some years ago but neither has been completed from want of fund."

— Governor Richard Bourke, to Lord Stanley, 30 September 1833.

Father Therry offered the first Mass in St John's Church, Campbelltown on 27 July 1834.

Father James Dunne took charge of Campbelltown parish in 1886 and one of his first tasks was to look for a new parish church. In March 1886 he signed a contract with Mr. Oliver Harley of Darlinghurst for the erection and completion of St John’s Church, Cordeaux Street for a sum of £1686. The architect was Mr. J.B. Barlow and Mr. Harley was bound to complete the church in 36 weeks. In June an additional contract was let for the addition of a chancel and sacristy together with the removal of the old water closet and the building of two new ones for a cost of £350. Cardinal Moran blessed and laid the foundation stone of the new St John’s on the corner of Cordeaux and Lindesay Streets, on 14 June 1886. The work was finished before Christmas and Fr Dunne privately blessed and opened the church on 12 December 1886. The official opening was performed by Cardinal Moran on 22 May 1887.

In 1886 the old church was converted into a school by way of a new floor being inserted and various changes made to openings. After the opening of the new St John's Catholic Church at the corner of Lindesay Street and Cordeaux Street, the old church was converted to St Patrick's Convent for the Good Samaritan Sisters and operated as a boarding school (both boarding and day) until 1970.

New porches, transepts, and stained glass were added to St John’s Church to increase the seating capacity of the church and were opened and blessed by Bishop Thomas McCabe on 15 March 1964.

In 1980 the Campbelltown Parish requested that consideration be given for Old St John's Church and Cemetery to be protected under the Heritage Act 1977 and seeking possible funding. On 4 March 1983, a Permanent Conservation Order was placed over the site.

In 1984 and with financial assistance from the Heritage Conservation Fund the Church returned the building largely to its original 1830s form.

On 2 April 1999, it was transferred to the State Heritage Register. This building used to be the old location of St Patricks college

== Description ==
=== Church building ===
A stuccoed brick church of simple Victorian Georgian design. The arched window openings and pilasters are marked by projecting render work and quoins represent ashlar work. The main roof and that over the porch are of simple pitched form.

=== Cemetery ===
Adjoining the church is the cemetery which contains the graves of many famous pioneers including James Ruse and Matthew Healey. The earliest grave is dated 1827.

James Ruse (1760–1837) arrived in Australia on the First Fleet and was fortunate to receive one of the first land grants in the colony, which was located in Parramatta. He is associated with Experiment Farm at Parramatta which in December 1789 had its first successful harvest. James Ruse is often referred to as Australia's first farmer and also known as the Father of Australia's wheat industry.

Matthew Healey played an important role in the early history of the Goulburn district for the inn which he built there called Riversdale and is the only surviving example of the old township as sited by Macquarie.

== Heritage listing ==
As at 5 December 2007, St John's Roman Catholic Church and Cemetery is of State significance for its associations with the Catholic Parish of Campbelltown, the second oldest parish in Australia. It is associated with the pioneers of the early Australian Catholic church, especially Father John Therry who designed the building. Construction of the masonry building was commenced in 1825 but it was not completed until 1841. It is thought to be the oldest masonry Catholic Church building in Australia. It is associated with James Ruse and Matthew Healy whose graves are located in the cemetery.

St John's Roman Catholic Church and Cemetery was listed on the New South Wales State Heritage Register on 2 April 1999.

== See also ==
- Roman Catholicism in Australia
- List of Roman Catholic churches in Sydney
