= Minto Heights =

- Suburb
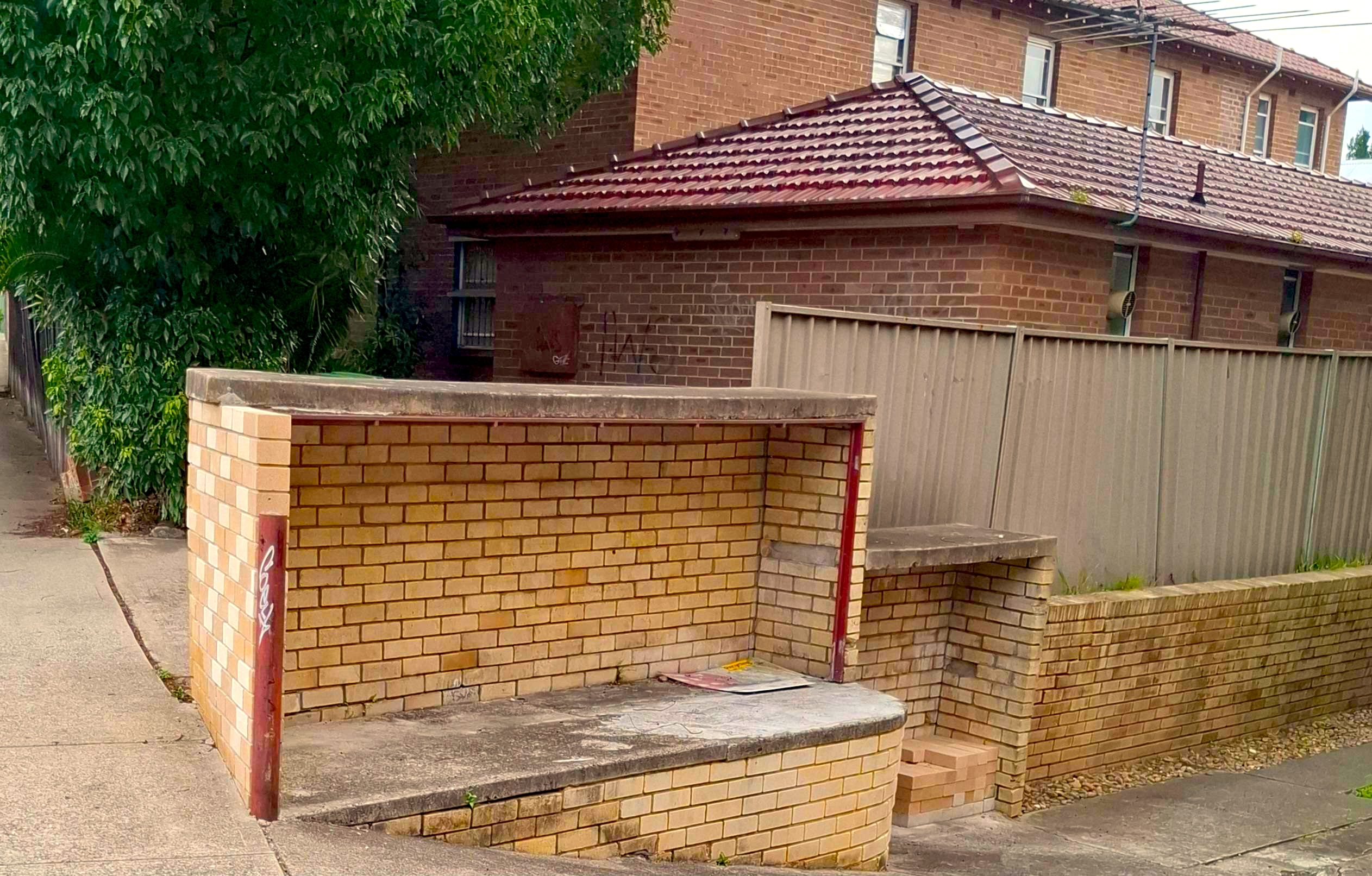
- Bus shelter in Minto Heights, pictured in 2023

- Interactive map of Minto Heights
- Country: Australia
- State: New South Wales
- City: Sydney
- LGA: City of Campbelltown
- Location: 50 km (31 mi) south-west of Sydney

Government
  - State electorate: Macquarie Fields
  - Federal division: Werriwa
- Elevation: 106 m (348 ft)

Population
  - Total: 384 (2021 census)
- Postcode: 2566
Suburbs around Minto Heights
Ingleburn	Ingleburn	Holsworthy
Minto	Minto Heights	Holsworthy
Leumeah	Kentlyn	Holsworthy

Minto Heights, sometimes and previously officially known as East Minto, is a suburb of Sydney, in the state of New South Wales, Australia 50 Kilometres south-west of the Sydney central business district, in the local government area of the City of Campbelltown. It is part of the Macarthur region.

It is notable for being the location of the Minto Communist Training School, a campsite previously operated by the Communist Party of Australia prior to 1991, and now operated by the Communist Party of Australia (Marxist–Leninist). It is located in the forest area near the Georges River. The camp hosted Seminars on topics such as the anti-war movement, gay rights, and Aboriginal autonomy, under the guise of being a "Bushlovers club".

== History ==
The Tharawal people were the original inhabitants of the region. The open space of the 5-acre (2.0 ha) blocks hints at the farming history of the area while the larger homes being built the suburb point to a more recent change in land use.

The bushland began to be cleared in the late 19th century to be replaced by orchards and other small farms. The area escaped major subdivision during Campbelltown's population boom of the 1970s when the Council zoned the suburb a "Scenic Protection Area" with minimum land sizes of 5 acres (2.0 ha). Until then, the area was known as East Minto and, like its neighbour, was named after the Earl of Minto, Gilbert Elliot-Murray-Kynynmound, who was Viceroy of India from 1807 to 1814. In 1973, Campbelltown Council proposed changing the name to Warby, which was rejected by locals who insisted it be called East Minto. This, in turn, was rejected by the Geographical Names Board of New South Wales, which had a policy against "East" and other compass points being added to suburb names. Eastminto, Myrtlefield, Hansen and Kyngmount were also rejected by one side or the other until consensus was reached with Minto Heights in 1976.

== Demographics ==
According to the 2021 census, the median age of residents was 44, 6 years higher than the national average of 38. The median weekly household income was $2,178, higher than the national average of $1,746. The average people per household was also recorded to be 3.3.
