= 2024 Campbelltown City Council election =

- 14 September 2024

All 15 seats on Campbelltown City Council 8 seats needed for a majority
- Registered: 119,951
- Turnout: 84.8%

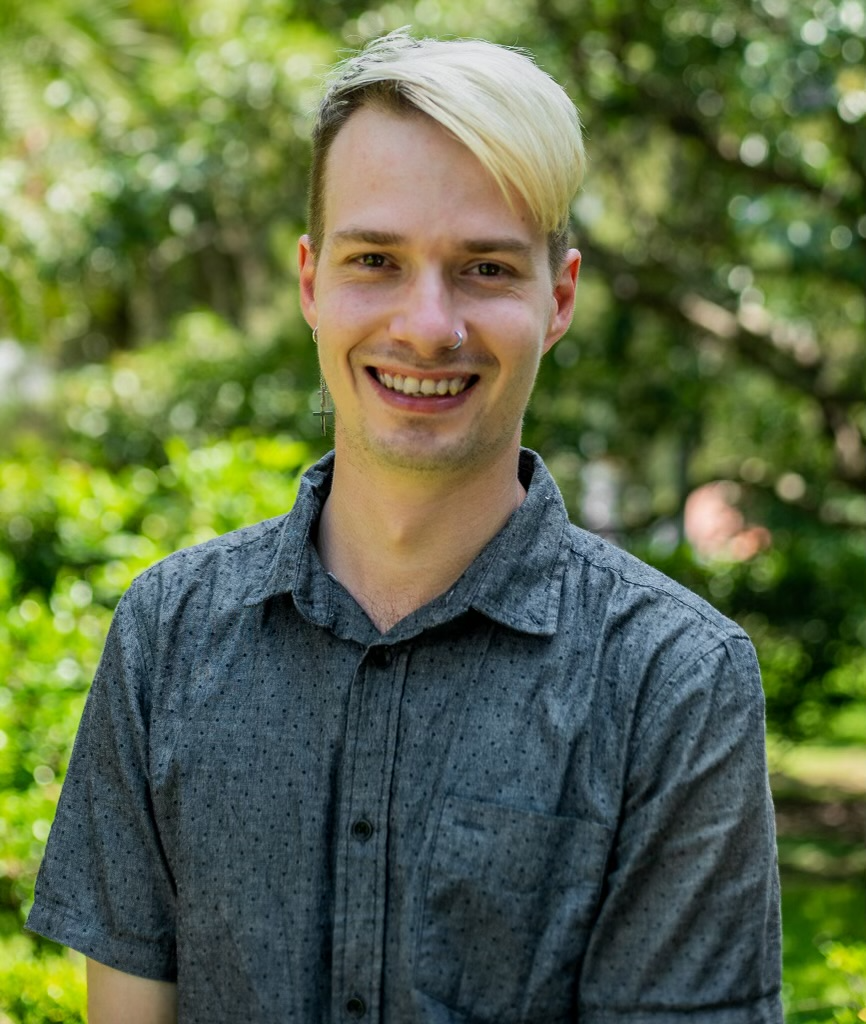

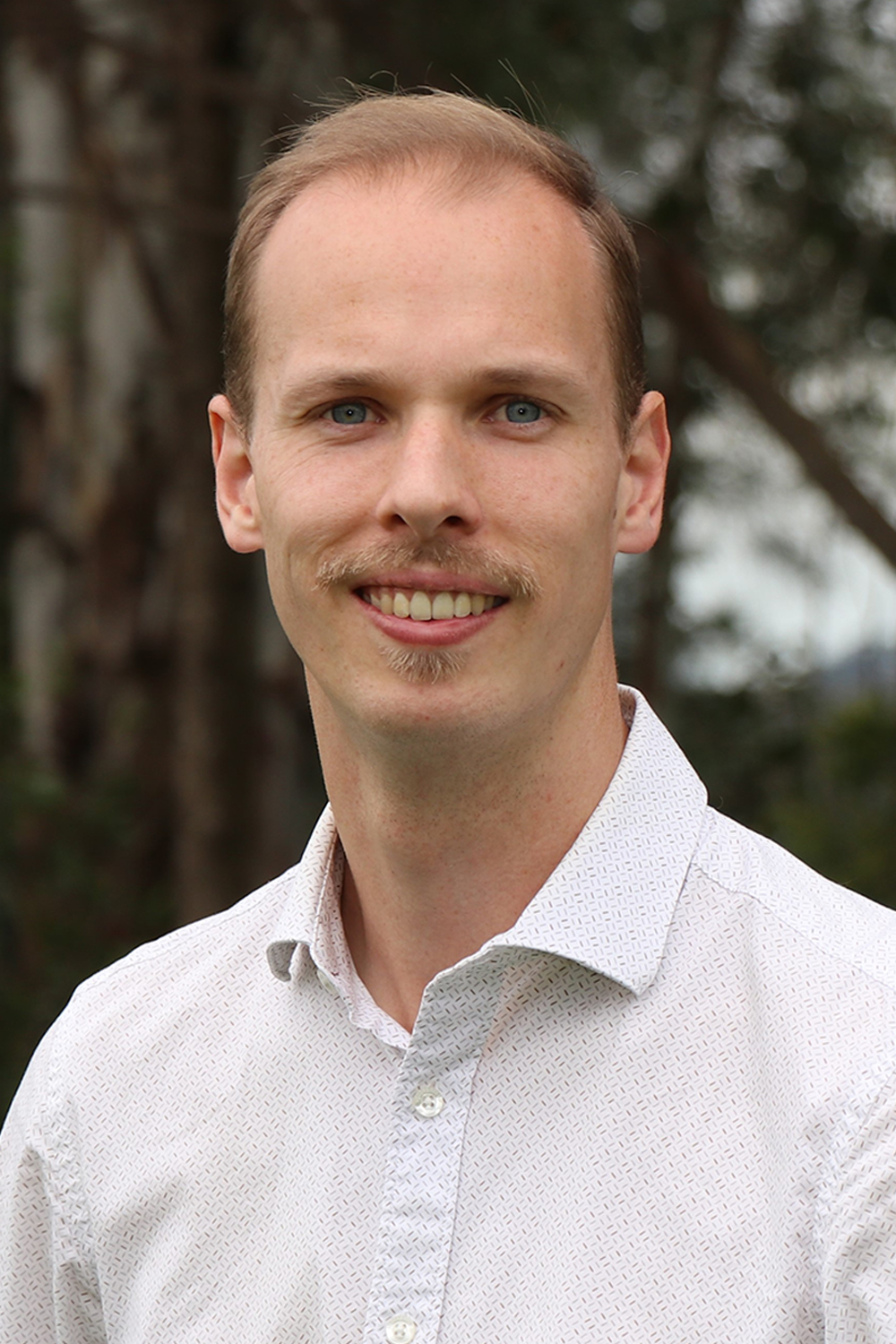

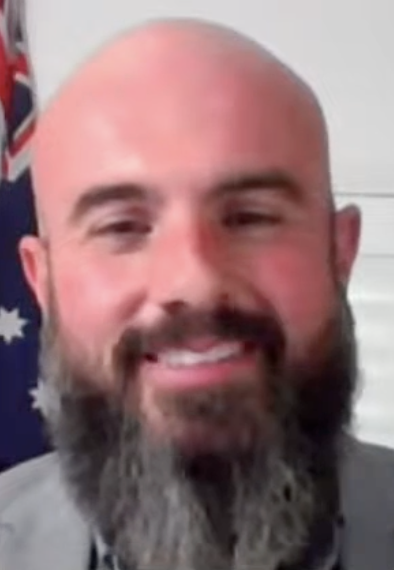
	First party	Second party	Third party
		CFTIP
Leader	Darcy Lound	Joshua Cotter	Masud Khalil
Party	Labor	CFTIP	Community Voice
Last election	7 seats	Did not exist	Did not exist
Seats before	5	2	1
Seats won	6	3	2
Seat change	▲1	▲1	▲1
Primary vote	36,072	17,494	11,045
Percentage	39.6%	19.2%	12.1%
Swing	▼4.2	▲5.3	▲7.2
	Fourth party	Fifth party	Sixth party
Leader	Jayden Rivera	Cameron McEwan	Adam Zahra
Party	Greens	Sustainable	IFC
Last election	0 seats	Did not contest	Did not exist
Seats before	0	0	0
Seats won	2	1	1
Seat change	▲2	▲1	▲1
Primary vote	9,801	9,475	5,480
Percentage	10.8%	10.4%	6.0%
Swing	▲6.3	▲10.4	▲6.0

The 2024 Campbelltown City Council election was held on 14 September 2024 to elect 15 councillors to the Campbelltown City Council. The election was held as part of the statewide local government elections in New South Wales.

The Labor Party won six seats, two short of a majority. The Liberal Party lost all four seats it held prior to the election, owing to a missed candidate nomination deadline which prevented its councillors from recontesting.

== Background ==
In January 2022, councillors George Brticevic and Margaret Chivers both left the Labor Party to sit as independents.

On 11 July 2024, the Community First Team and the Totally Locally Committed Party merged to form the Community First Totally Independent Party. Both parties had one councillor elected each in 2021 (Josh Cotter and Warren Morrison respectively).

== Electoral system ==
Like in all other New South Wales local government areas (LGAs), Campbelltown City Council elections use optional preferential voting. Under this system, voters are only required to vote for one candidate or group, although they can choose to preference other candidates.

All elections for councillor positions are elected using proportional representation. Campbelltown has an Australian Senate-style ballot paper with above-the-line and below-the-line voting. The council is composed of a single ward.

The election was conducted by the New South Wales Electoral Commission (NSWEC).

== Retiring councillors ==
=== Labor ===
- Rey Manoto

=== Liberal ===
- George Greiss – announced 16 April 2024

=== Independents ===
- George Brticevic
- Margaret Chivers

== Candidates ==
On 14 August 2024, the day that candidates nominations closed, the Liberal Party revealed they had missed the deadline to nominate 164 candidates in 16 different LGAs. This included all Liberal councillors seeking re-election to Campbelltown City Council.

One Nation member Adam Zahra led the conservative "Independents for Campbelltown" group.

Sustainable Australia (Group A)	Animal Justice (Group B)	Community Voice (Group C)	Inds for Campbelltown (Group D)	Greens (Group E)
1. Cameron McEwan; 2. Timothy Longford; 3. Deeban Jayaseelan; 4. Anne Crighton; 5. Trevor Hooper; 6. Amy McEwan; 7. Stephen Macris; 8. Gregory Bran	1. Matthew Stellino; 2. Stephanie Poole; 3. Benjamin Bank; 4. Lisa Bicknell; 5. Joanne Callaghan; 6. Hailey Tiernan; 7. David Ward	1. Masud Khalil; 2. Khaled Halabi; 3. Sajjan Karki; 4. Bellal Jaber; 5. John Becerra; 6. Morsheda Khan; 7. Khurshida Hossain; 8. Farzana Khan; 9. Penisimani Fonua; 10. Md Siddiqui; 11. Abul Iqbal; 12. Tanveer Howladar; 13. Md Ataur Rahman	1. Adam Zahra; 2. Annika Thompson; 3. Lawson Hagan; 4. Evan Harris; 5. Tatum Zahra; 6. Matthew Zahra; 7. Robert Byers; 8. Angus Van Der Schyff; 9. Marie Zahra	1. Jayden Rivera; 2. Tao Triebels; 3. Penelope Hlavaty; 4. Jaydn Pye; 5. Victoria Waldron Hahn; 6. Coral Ison; 7. Stephen Bailey; 8. Melanie Cotton
CFTIP (Group F)	Labor (Group G)	Independent (Group H)	Ungrouped	
1. Joshua Cotter; 2. Warren Morrison; 3. Seta Berbari; 4. Patrick Zarzour; 5. Ian Kelly; 6. Tammy Hatch; 7. Teresita Alivio; 8. Mark Keaton; 9. George Boustani; 10. Stanley Abnes	1. Darcy Lound; 2. Meg Oates; 3. Masood Chowdhury; 4. Karen Hunt; 5. Isabella Wisniewska; 6. Ash Rahman; 7. David Weblin; 8. Parvez Khan; 9. Mina Skandari	1. Mukesh Chand; 2. Rohit Gupta; 3. Asiful Islam; 4. Faiyaz Hussain; 5. Jawad El Asman; 6. Francis Singh; 7. Manish Chand; 8. Shival Chand	Lisa Riordan (AJP)	

=== Withdrawn candidates ===
Party	Candidate	Details
Liberal	John Chew	Incumbent councillor unable to recontest because of missed candidacy deadline.
Liberal	Marian George	Incumbent councillor unable to recontest because of missed candidacy deadline.
Liberal	Riley Munro	Incumbent councillor unable to recontest because of missed candidacy deadline.

== Results ==
2024 Campbelltown City Council election
Party	Candidate	Votes	%	±%
Labor	1. Darcy Lound (elected 1); 2. Meg Oates (elected 6); 3. Masood Chowdhury (elected 8); 4. Karen Hunt (elected 9); 5. Isabella Wisniewska (elected 10); 6. Ash Rahman (elected 11); 7. David Weblin; 8. Parvez Khan; 9. Mina Skandari	36,072	39.6	−4.2
Community First Totally Independent	1. Joshua Cotter (elected 2); 2. Warren Morrison (elected 7); 3. Seta Berbari (elected 12); 4. Patrick Zarzour; 5. Ian Kelly; 6. Tammy Hatch; 7. Teresita Alivio; 8. Mark Keaton; 9. George Boustani; 10. Stanley Abnes	17,494	19.2	+5.3
Community Voice	1. Masud Khalil (elected 3); 2. Khaled Halabi (elected 14); 3. Sajjan Karki; 4. Bellal Jaber; 5. John Becerra; 6. Morsheda Khan; 7. Khurshida Hossain; 8. Farzana Khan; 9. Penisimani Fonua; 10. Md Siddiqui; 11. Abul Iqbal; 12. Tanveer Howladar; 13. Md Ataur Rahman	11,045	12.1	+7.2
Greens	1. Jayden Rivera (elected 4); 2. Tao Triebels (elected 15); 3. Penelope Hlavaty; 4. Jaydn Pye; 5. Victoria Waldron Hahn; 6. Coral Ison; 7. Stephen Bailey; 8. Melanie Cotton	9,801	10.8	+6.3
Sustainable Australia	1. Cameron McEwan (elected 5); 2. Timothy Longford; 3. Deeban Jayaseelan; 4. Anne Crighton; 5. Trevor Hooper; 6. Amy McEwan; 7. Stephen Macris; 8. Gregory Bran	9,475	10.4	+10.4
Independents for Campbelltown	1. Adam Zahra (elected 13); 2. Annika Thompson; 3. Lawson Hagan; 4. Evan Harris; 5. Tatum Zahra; 6. Matthew Zahra; 7. Robert Byers; 8. Angus Van Der Schyff; 9. Marie Zahra	5,480	6.0	+6.0
Independent	1. Mukesh Chand; 2. Rohit Gupta; 3. Asiful Islam; 4. Faiyaz Hussain; 5. Jawad El Asman; 6. Francis Singh; 7. Manish Chand; 8. Shival Chand	1,005	1.1	+1.0
Animal Justice	1. Matthew Stellino; 2. Stephanie Poole; 3. Benjamin Bank; 4. Lisa Bicknell; 5. Joanne Callaghan; 6. Hailey Tiernan; 7. David Ward	465	0.5	−4.3
Animal Justice	Lisa Riordan	180	0.2	+0.2
Total formal votes		91,017	89.5	
Informal votes		10,650	10.5	
Turnout		101,667	84.8	

=== Results summary ===
2024 Campbelltown City Council election: Results summary
Party	Votes	%	Swing	Seats	Change
Labor	36,072	39.6	−4.2	6	▼1
Community First Totally Independent	17,494	19.2	+5.3	3	▲3
Community Voice of Australia	11,045	12.1	+7.2	2	▲1
Greens	9,801	10.8	+6.3	2	▲2
Sustainable Australia	9,475	10.4	+10.4	1	▲1
Independents for Campbelltown	5,480	6.0	+6.0	1	▲1
Independents	1,005	1.1	+1.0	0	Steady
Animal Justice	645	0.7	−4.1	0	▼1
Formal votes	91,017	89.5			
Informal votes	10,650	10.5			
Total	101,667	100.0		15	
Registered voters / turnout	119,951	84.8			
