= WorkVentures =

Australian non-profit organization

The WorkVentures logo

WorkVentures is an Australian independent not-for-profit social enterprise, established in 1979 and, as of 2010, employing more than 170 people across seven locations in Sydney and Melbourne. WorkVentures also works with partner organisations to deliver training and programs around the country.

== History ==
WorkVentures started in 1979 as Peninsula Community Services, based in the Malabar/La Perouse area in Sydney's south-east. The organisation initially ran a range of programs including holiday programs, a recycling venture, and other community-based projects, however from 1984 onwards the focus has been on employment, training, and technical services. In 2002, WorkVentures was one of the four organisations that established Social Ventures Australia.

In 2005, WorkVentures and Microsoft Australia won the Prime Minister's Award for Excellence in Community Business Partnership, Longevity category for their 19-year partnership.

Until June 2009, WorkVentures was a provider of employment services in the Job Network.

In 2010, former CEO and Founder Steve Lawrence was appointed an Officer of the Order of Australia (AO) in the 2010 Australia Day Honours list. Steve was awarded his honour for his service to the community through leadership roles in the development and implementation of not-for-profit ventures to create social change, particularly for youth and the long-term unemployed.

== Community activities ==
WorkVentures works in the community through several different channels, including three Connect Centres located in public housing estates in Airds, Claymore and Macquarie Fields in south-west Sydney. The Connect Centres provide local residents free access to computers, training and job search support.

WorkVentures also works with community partners to deliver technology-focused programs such as its iGetIT! computer hardware training for indigenous and disadvantaged youth, and the i.settle.with.IT! program to improve the software skills and employment opportunities for refugees and migrants. The i.settle.with.IT program was highly commended in the Social Inclusion category in the 2010 University of Technology Sydney Human Rights Awards for its work as a community partner for Dr Linda Leung. Dr Leung was highly commended for her work in generating new knowledge about the importance of technology in refugees' forced migration and resettlement experiences, which is now informing settlement programs for refugee communities.

WorkVentures works in remote communities, and has worked in partnership to supply computers, technical support and iGetIT! training in computer maintenance for the Indigenous Technology and Knowledge Centres at Hope Vale and Wujal Wujal on the Cape York Peninsula in Far North Queensland.

== Social enterprises ==
WorkVentures operates social enterprises that support the financial sustainability of the organisation as well as extend its mission. This has been done through partnerships with governments, businesses, and the community.

WorkVentures' social enterprises include the Sydney ITeC Repair Centre (SIRC), with locations in Sydney and Melbourne. SIRC is one of the largest suppliers in Australia of electronic repair services to companies such as banks, retailers and telecommunications companies. Equipment repaired include computers and computer peripherals, power supplies, automatic teller machines, scanners, parking meters and telecommunication equipment.

SIRC also supplies the technical support for WorkVentures' Connect IT program, which offers low cost refurbished PCs to low income households (mainly Centrelink cardholders), schools and non-profit organisations across Australia. Corporations and government donate their fleets of used PCs that are then either refurbished by SIRC or recycled. WorkVentures is a Microsoft Registered Refurbisher so the PCs are loaded with Microsoft software and are promoted through distribution partners including Centrelink. Originally established in 2002, Connect IT delivered its 20,000th low cost PC in July 2009.

WorkVentures is a vocational education and training provider, offering a traineeship program to create entry-level training opportunities. It is a registered Group Training Organisation, which means it complies with the Australian National Standards for Group Training Organisations.

== Other references ==
- "SVA website: Who we are". Social Ventures Australia.
- WorkVentures case study in Social Ventures Australia's Business planning guide for social enterprises 2010
- WorkVentures case study in Per Capita's Case studies in social innovation 2008
- WorkVentures case study in Jobs Australia's 10 Forces at Work 2008
- WorkVentures case study in The Smith Family's Microsoft Unlimited Potential Good Practice Guide 2007
- WorkVentures case study in Australian Stories of Social Enterprise by Cheryl Kernot and Joanne McNeill, published by Centre for Social Impact April 2011
