= Kentlyn =

- Suburb
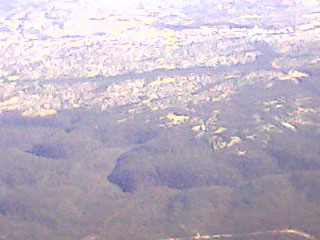
- Aerial view (looking west) of Kentlyn, Ruse and Campbelltown.

- Interactive map of Kentlyn
- Country: Australia
- State: New South Wales
- City: Sydney
- LGA: City of Campbelltown
- Location: 58 km (36 mi) south-west of Sydney CBD
- Established: 1933

Government
  - State electorate: Macquarie Fields
  - Federal division: Macarthur
- Elevation: 153 m (502 ft)

Population
  - Total: 726 (2021 census)
- Postcode: 2560
Suburbs around Kentlyn
Leumeah	Minto Heights	Holsworthy
Ruse	Kentlyn	Holsworthy
Airds	Holsworthy	Holsworthy

Kentlyn is a suburb of Sydney, in the state of New South Wales, Australia 58 kilometres south-west of the Sydney central business district, in the local government area of the City of Campbelltown. It is part of the Macarthur region.

== History ==
Kentlyn was originally home to the Tharawal people who may have occupied the area for thousands of years. The area was largely uninhabited for the early 19th century until the 1890s when farmers started settling land. It became known as the Kent Farms and in 1933, it was formally dubbed Kent Lyn, which later modified to Kentlyn.

During the Great Depression of the 1930s, it became something of a shantytown for families who had lost their homes. Kentlyn Post Office was open from 1936 until 1938. During the 1970s, when substantial areas of Campbelltown were being opened up for development, the Council chose to protect Kentlyn with minimum lots of 5 acres (20,000 m^{2}). These days it is considered one of the more upmarket parts of Campbelltown.

== Heritage listings ==
Kentlyn has a number of heritage-listed sites, including:

- Darling Avenue: Bull Cave

== People ==
In the 2021 census, Kentlyn recorded a population of 726 people. 69.3% of people were born in Australia and 71.3% of people spoke only English at home. The most common responses for religion were Catholic 26.9%, No Religion 20.4% and Anglican 14.3%.

The median age of people in Kentlyn was 43 years. Children aged 0 – 14 years made up 16.3% of the population and people aged 65 years and over made up 22.4% of the population.

The median household weekly income was $2,066 compared to the national median of $1,746. Of the 206 occupied dwellings, 85.9% were separate houses, with 11.2% being flats or apartments.
