= Minto Communist Training School =

CPA National Training Centre
- Coordinates: 34.0337452°S 150.8804265°E
- Country: Australia
- State: New South Wales
- City: Minto Heights
- Established: 1958
- Abolished: 1991

The CPA National Training Centre was a communist training camp and assembly operated by the Communist Party of Australia (CPA) from 1958 until the party's dissolution in 1991. It was located near the Georges River in the suburb of Minto Heights. The training camp has also been used by the Communist Party of Australia (Marxist–Leninist) after 1991.

Despite being commonly known as being located in Minto, the camp was not located in Minto proper but the neighbouring suburb of Minto Heights (formerly known as East Minto).

== History ==
Located in Minto Heights, NSW, the camp operated under the front of the "Bushlovers' Club". The camp initially attracted controversy on the tail of the second Red Scare wave, being described as a "brainwashing" institution by the National President of the RSL and connected to various industrial agitations. Over its lifetime, Eric Aarons served as the school principal and was a key figure in its formation and operation.

== Activities ==
Until the 1980s, part of the site's function was as a school in Marxist thought, economics and their relation to Australian politics. During this period, and for the remainder of its life, the site also functioned as an assembly grounds where seminars on gay rights, feminism, and Indigenous Australian autonomy were held.

This association with Indigenous land rights movement led the National Party and the League of Rights to portray Indigenous Australian sovereignty as a communist conspiracy to establish a Marxist state within Australia. This, largely discredited, theory was first advanced by a book written by a former member of the CPA, which saw minor success as a result of this publicity but drew heavy criticism from Jewish groups over its antisemitic publisher and its association with racist, antisemitic organisations.
