= City of Campbelltown (New South Wales) =

- Local government area
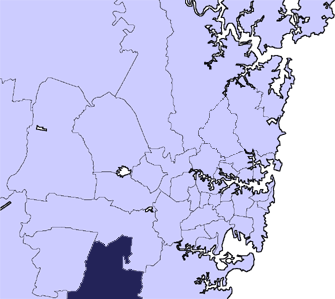
- Location in Metropolitan Sydney

- Interactive map of City of Campbelltown
- Coordinates: 34°04′S 150°49′E
- Country: Australia
- State: New South Wales
- Region: Greater Western Sydney
- Established: 1882 (Municipality); 4 May 1968 (as a city)
- Council seat: Campbelltown

Government
  - Mayor: Darcy Lound (Labor)
  - State electorates: Campbelltown; Leppington; Macquarie Fields
  - Federal divisions: Hughes; Macarthur; Werriwa

Area
  - Total: 312 km^{2} (120 sq mi)

Population
  - Totals: 176,519 (2021 census) (37th); 184,784 (2023 est.)
  - Density: 509.4/km^{2} (1,319/sq mi)
- Website: City of Campbelltown
LGAs around City of Campbelltown
| Camden | Liverpool | Liverpool |
| Camden | City of Campbelltown | Sutherland |
| Wollondilly | Wollondilly | Wollongong |

The City of Campbelltown is a local government area in the Macarthur region of south-western Sydney, in New South Wales, Australia. The area is located about 55 kilometres (34 mi) south west of the Sydney central business district and comprises 312 square kilometres (120 sq mi).

The mayor of the city of Campbelltown is Cr. Darcy Lound, a member of the Labor Party.

== Suburbs in the local government area ==
Suburbs in the City of Campbelltown are:

- Airds
- Ambarvale
- Bardia
- Blair Athol
- Blairmount
- Bow Bowing
- Bradbury
- Campbelltown
- Claymore
- Denham Court
- Eagle Vale
- Edmondson Park (South)
- Englorie Park
- Eschol Park
- Gilead
- Glen Alpine
- Glenfield
- Ingleburn
- Kearns
- Kentlyn
- Leumeah
- Long Point
- Macarthur Heights
- Macquarie Fields
- Macquarie Links
- Menangle Park
- Minto
- Minto Heights
- Raby
- Rosemeadow
- Ruse
- St Andrews
- St Helens Park
- Varroville
- Wedderburn
- Woodbine

== Demographics ==
At the 2016 census there were 157,006 people in the Campbelltown local government area, of these 49% were male and 51% were female. Aboriginal and Torres Strait Islander people made up 3.8% of the population; 30% more than the NSW and Australian averages of 2.9% and 2.8% respectively. The median age of people in the City of Campbelltown was 34 years, which is significantly lower than the national median of 37 years. Children aged 0 – 14 years made up 21.6% of the population and people aged 65 years and over made up 11.8% of the population. Of people in the area aged 15 years and over, 47.1% were married and 87% were either divorced or separated.

Over the 10-year period between the 2001 census and the 2011 census, the population of the Campbelltown Local Government Area increased by a recorded total of 673 people (0.46% increase in population over 10 years) from 145,294 people to 145,967 people. During that 10-year period the population had decreased by 1.53% at the 2006 census, and experienced a population increase of 2.02% over the subsequent five years to the 2011 census. At the 2016 census, the population in the Campbelltown Local Government Area increased by 7.56%. When compared with total population growth of Australia for the same period, being 8.8%, population growth in the Campbelltown Local Government Area was slightly below the national average. The median weekly income for residents within the Campbelltown Local Government Area was generally on par with the national average.

Selected historical census data for Campbelltown local government area
| Census year | | 2001 | 2006 | 2011 | 2016 | 2021 |
|---|---|---|---|---|---|---|
| Population | Estimated residents on census night | 145,294 | ▼143,076 | ▲145,967 | ▲157,006 | ▲176,519 |
| Population | LGA rank in terms of size within New South Wales | | | 19th | ▲16th | 16th |
| Population | % of New South Wales population | | | 2.11% | ▼2.10% | ▲2.19% |
| Population | % of Australian population | 0.77% | ▼0.72% | ▼0.68% | ▼0.67% | ▲0.69% |
| Median weekly incomes | | | | | | |
| Personal income | Median weekly personal income | | A$464 | ▲ A$549 | ▲ A$632 | ▲ A$738 |
| Personal income | % of Australian median income | | 99.6% | ▼95.1% | ▲95.5% | ▼90.8% |
| Family income | Median weekly family income | | A$1,066 | ▲ A$1,390 | ▲ A$1,597 | ▲ A$1,927 |
| Family income | % of Australian median income | | 103.8% | ▼93.9% | ▼92.1% | ▼88.2% |
| Household income | Median weekly household income | | A$1,156 | ▲ A$1,251 | ▲ A$1,459 | ▲ A$1,700 |
| Household income | % of Australian median income | | 98.7% | ▲101.4% | 101.4% | ▼92.9% |

Selected historical census data for Camden local government area
Ancestry, top responses
| 2001 | | 2006 | | 2011 | | 2016 | | 2021 | |
|---|---|---|---|---|---|---|---|---|---|
| No Data | | No Data | | Australian | 25.1% | Australian | ▼21.6% | Australian | ▲24.8% |
| No Data | | No Data | | English | 22.1% | English | ▼20.3% | English | ▲22.5% |
| No Data | | No Data | | Irish | 5.9% | Irish | ▼5.8% | Indian | ▲6.0% |
| No Data | | No Data | | Scottish | 5.0% | Scottish | ▼4.7% | Irish | ▼5.7% |
| No Data | | No Data | | Indian | 2.9% | Indian | ▲4.2% | Scottish | ▲5.0% |
Country of birth
| 2001 | | 2006 | | 2011 | | 2016 | | 2021 | |
| Australia | 68.4% | Australia | ▼66.8% | Australia | ▼66.0% | Australia | ▼62.0% | Australia | ▼59.5% |
| England | 4.1% | England | ▼3.5% | England | ▼3.1% | India | ▲2.9% | India | ▲3.9% |
| New Zealand | 2.1% | New Zealand | ▲2.3% | New Zealand | ▲2.6% | New Zealand | ▲2.7% | Bangladesh | ▲3.1% |
| Philippines | 1.8% | Philippines | ▲2.1% | Philippines | ▲2.5% | Philippines | ▲2.6% | Philippines | ▲2.8% |
| Fiji | 1.1% | Fiji | ▲1.4% | India | ▲2.0% | England | ▼2.5% | New Zealand | ▼2.4% |
| India | 0.9% | India | ▲1.3% | Fiji | ▲1.6% | Bangladesh | ▲2.1% | Nepal | ▲2.1% |
Language, top responses (other than English)
| 2001 | | 2006 | | 2011 | | 2016 | | 2021 | |
| Arabic | 2.3% | Arabic | ▲2.7% | Arabic | 2.7% | Arabic | ▲3.4% | Arabic | ▲4.2% |
| Spanish | 1.8% | Spanish | ▼1.7% | Samoan | ▲2.1% | Bengali | ▲3.0% | Bengali | ▲4.2% |
| Tagalog | 1.5% | Samoan | ▲1.7% | Hindi | ▲2.1% | Hindi | ▲2.4% | Nepali | ▲2.5% |
| Samoan | 1.4% | Hindi | ▲1.6% | Bengali | ▲1.8% | Samoan | ▲2.2% | Hindi | ▼2.1% |
| Hindi | 1.2% | Tagalog | ▼1.1% | Spanish | 1.7% | Spanish | 1.7% | Samoan | ▼1.8% |
Religious affiliation
| 2001 | | 2006 | | 2011 | | 2016 | | 2021 | |
| Catholic | 32.1% | Catholic | ▼30.9% | Catholic | ▼30.3% | Catholic | ▼26.6% | Catholic | ▼22.8% |
| Anglican | 25.9% | Anglican | ▼23.3% | Anglican | ▼21.0% | No Religion | ▲17.9% | No Religion | ▲21.9% |
| No Religion | 9.1% | No Religion | ▲10.7% | No Religion | ▲12.5% | Anglican | ▼15.2% | Islam | ▲11.6% |
| Islam | 3.3% | Islam | ▲4.5% | Islam | ▲5.7% | Not Stated | 8.3% | Anglican | ▼10.5% |
| Uniting Church | 3.2% | Uniting Church | ▼2.8% | Hinduism | ▲3.0% | Islam | ▲7.9% | Hinduism | ▲7.0% |

== Council ==
=== Current composition and election method ===
Campbelltown City Council is composed of fifteen councillors elected proportionally as one entire ward. All councillors are elected for a fixed four-year term of office. The mayor is elected by the councillors at the first meeting of the council. The most recent council election was held on 14 September 2024, and the makeup of the council is as follows:

| Party | Councillors |
|---|---|
| Labor Party | 6 |
| The Greens | 2 |
| Sustainable Australia | 1 |
| Independent | 1 |
| Community Voice | 2 |
| Community First Totally Independent | 3 |
| Total | 15 |

The current Council, elected in 2024, in order of election, is:

| Councillor | Party | Notes |
|---|---|---|
| Cameron McEwan | Sustainable Australia | |
| Muhamad (Masud) Khalil | Community Voice | |
| Jayden Rivera | The Greens | Former Deputy Mayor (2025–26) |
| Joshua Cotter | Community First Totally Independent | Formerly represented Community First Team, merged with Totally Locally Committed for the 2024 election. |
| Darcy Lound | Labor | Mayor (since 2024) |
| Meg Oates | Labor | |
| Warren Morrison | Community First Totally Independent | Formerly represented Totally Locally Committed, merged with Community First Team for the 2024 election. |
| Masood Chowdhury | Labor | Deputy Mayor |
| Karen Hunt | Labor | Former Deputy Mayor (2024–25) |
| Isabella Wisniewska | Labor | |
| Ashiqur (Ash) Rahman | Labor | |
| Seta Berbari | Community First Totally Independent | |
| Adam Zahra | Independent | Member of the One Nation party. Ran for the party in the New South Wales Legislative Assembly electorate of Campbelltown in 2023. |
| Khaled Halabi | Community Voice | |
| Theo (Tao) Triebels | The Greens | |

== Election results ==
=== 2024 ===
2024 Campbelltown City Council election: Results summary
| Party | Votes | % | Swing | Seats | Change |
|---|---|---|---|---|---|
| Labor | 36,072 | 39.6 | −4.2 | 6 | ▼1 |
| Community First Totally Independent | 17,494 | 19.2 | +5.3 | 3 | ▲3 |
| Community Voice of Australia | 11,045 | 12.1 | +7.2 | 2 | ▲1 |
| Greens | 9,801 | 10.8 | +6.3 | 2 | ▲2 |
| Sustainable Australia | 9,475 | 10.4 | +10.4 | 1 | ▲1 |
| Independents for Campbelltown | 5,480 | 6.0 | +6.0 | 1 | ▲1 |
| Independents | 1,005 | 1.1 | +1.0 | 0 | Steady |
| Animal Justice | 645 | 0.7 | −4.1 | 0 | ▼1 |
| Formal votes | 91,017 | 89.5 | | | |
| Informal votes | 10,650 | 10.5 | | | |
| Total | 101,667 | 100.0 | | 15 | |
| Registered voters / turnout | 119,951 | 84.8 | | | |

=== 2021 ===
| Elected councillor | Party |
|---|---|
| George Brticevic | Labor |
| Meg Oates | Labor |
| Darcy Lound | Labor |
| Margaret Chivers | Labor |
| Rey Manoto | Labor |
| Masood Chowdhury | Labor |
| Karen Hunt | Labor |
| George Greiss | Liberal |
| Marian George | Liberal |
| Riley Munro | Liberal |
| John Chew | Liberal |
| Matt Stellino | Animal Justice |
| Josh Cotter | Community First |
| Masud Khalil | Community Voice |
| Warren Morrison | TLCP |

2021 New South Wales local elections: Campbelltown
| Party | Candidate | Votes | % | ±% |
|---|---|---|---|---|
| Labor | | 39,162 | 43.8 | +0.5 |
| Liberal | | 22,056 | 24.7 | +8.2 |
| Community First Team | | 7,561 | 8.5 | −0.4 |
| Totally Locally Committed | | 4,809 | 5.4 | −4.6 |
| Community Voice | | 4,388 | 4.9 | |
| Animal Justice | | 4,261 | 4.8 | +4.8 |
| Greens | | 4,057 | 4.5 | −0.4 |
| Campbelltown Independents | | 2,857 | 3.2 | |
| Independent | Mukesh Chand | 98 | 0.1 | |
| Independent | Mick Allen | 88 | 0.1 | |
| Total formal votes | | 89,337 | 93.7 | |
| Informal votes | | 6,011 | 6.3 | |
| Turnout | | 95,348 | 84.4 | |
| Party total seats | | | Seats | ± |
| Labor | | | 7 | Steady |
| Liberal | | | 4 | ▲1 |
| Community First Team | | | 1 | Steady |
| Totally Locally Committed | | | 1 | ▼1 |
| Community Voice | | | 1 | ▲1 |
| Animal Justice | | | 1 | ▲1 |
| Greens | | | 0 | ▼1 |

Four councillors did not seek re-election:

- Ralph George (Liberal) − announced 3 November 2021
- Ted Rowell (Liberal) − announced 3 November 2021
- Paul Lake (Community First) − announced 3 November 2021
- Bob Thompson (Bob Thompson's Independent Team) − announced 3 November 2021

== History and growth ==
Campbelltown was founded in 1820, named after Elizabeth Macquarie née Campbell, wife of the then Governor Lachlan Macquarie. The town was one of a series of south-western settlements established by Macquarie at that time; the others include Ingleburn and Liverpool.

Campbelltown Council was originally incorporated on 21 January 1882. The present boundaries of the City of Campbelltown were largely formed in 1949, following the amalgamation of the Municipalities of Ingleburn (incorporated in April 1896) and Campbelltown, as part of a rationalisation of local government areas across New South Wales following World War II. Campbelltown was presented with its own coat of arms in 1969. The coat of arms were based those on the arms of the Campbell family in Scotland.

Campbelltown was designated as a satellite city and a regional capital for the south west of Sydney in the early 1960s in the Sydney Region Outline Plan, prepared by the Planning Commission of New South Wales. There was extensive building and population growth in the intervening time and the government surrounded the township with areas which were set aside for public and private housing and industry.

Campbelltown was declared a city on 4 May 1968 by the Hon. Pat Morton, Minister for Local Government and Highways. That same day saw the arrival of the first electric train to Campbelltown from Sydney.

As a city, Campbelltown honoured the 1st Signals Regiment (now the 1st Joint Support Unit) with the medieval custom of the Freedom of the city. The mayor, Alderman Clive Tregear, wanted to recognise the contribution to the units based at the Ingleburn Army Barracks. The regiment marched through Campbelltown until it got transferred to Queensland in the 1980s.

Opened in 2005, the Campbelltown Arts Centre is a cultural facility of Campbelltown City Council that is partially funded by the New South Wales Government through Create NSW.

== Heritage listings ==
The City of Campbelltown has a number of heritage-listed sites, including:

- Campbelltown, Broughton Street: St John's Catholic Church, Campbelltown
- Campbelltown, 8 Lithgow Street: Glenalvon House
- Campbelltown, 14–20 Queen Street: Warbys Barn and Stables
- Campbelltown, 261 Queen Street: Campbelltown Post Office
- Campbelltown, 263 Queen Street: Commercial Banking Company of Sydney, Campbelltown Branch (former)
- Campbelltown, 284–298 Queen Street: Queen Street Buildings
- Campbelltown, 303 Queen Street: Dredges Cottage
- Denham Court, 238 Campbelltown Road: Denham Court (homestead)
- Gilead, 767 Appin Road: Beulah, Gilead
- Gilead, Menangle Road: Sugarloaf Farm
- Ingleburn, 196 Campbelltown Road: Robin Hood Farm
- Kearns, Mississippi Crescent: Epping Forest, Kearns
- Kentlyn, Darling Avenue: Bull Cave
- Leumeah, Holly Lea Road: Holly Lea and Plough Inn
- Macquarie Fields, Quarter Sessions Road: Macquarie Field House
- Menangle Park, Glenlee Road: Glenlee, Menangle Park
- Minto, Lot 315 Ben Lomond Road: Stone Cottage, Minto
- St Helens Park, Appin Road: Denfield
- St Helens Park, St Helens Park Drive: St Helen's Park
- Varroville, 196 St Andrews Road: Varroville (homestead)

== Transport links ==
=== Road transport corridors ===
The principle access roads to and from Campbelltown are:

- Appin Road and The Hume Highway to the south;
- Narellan Road to the west; and
- The Hume Highway and Cambridge Avenue to the north.

There is no direct eastern road access. As a fast-growing regional centre, road infrastructure has yet to catch up with the historically strong population growth. Areas of greatest concern include congestion on Narellan Road, numerous road fatalities on Appin Road and the inadequate causeway over the Georges River at Cambridge Avenue, Glenfield.

=== Rail transport corridor ===
Campbelltown is served by trains on the Sydney suburban rail network (Sydney Trains), with railway stations:

- Macarthur
- Campbelltown
- Leumeah
- Minto
- Ingleburn
- Macquarie Fields
- Glenfield

== Major council facilities ==
- Campbelltown Civic Centre, Queen Street, Campbelltown.
- Campbelltown Arts Centre, a contemporary arts centre located at the corner of Camden & Appin Roads, Campbelltown.
- Campbelltown Stadium, Leumeah, a sports stadium used mainly for football and rugby league.
- The Gordon Fetterplace Aquatic Centre, The Parkway, Bradbury.
- Eagle Vale Central, Emerald Drive, Eagle Vale.
- Macquarie Fields Indoor Sports Centre, Fields Road, Macquarie Fields.
- Macquarie Fields Leisure Centre, Fields Road, Macquarie Fields.
- HJ Daley Library, Hurley Street, Campbelltown.
- Greg Percival Library, corner of Oxford Road & Cumberland Road, Ingleburn.
- Glenquarie Library, Brooks Street, Macquarie Fields.

The Spring Farm Resource Recovery Park at Spring Farm processes household waste from the Campbelltown City Council, Camden Council, Wollondilly Shire Council and Wingecarribee Shire Council areas. The site includes a materials recycling facility (MRF) for sorting kerbside recyclables and recovering reusable materials. General waste and garden organics are temporarily stored before being transferred to landfill and commercial composting facilities, respectively.

== Festivals ==
- Festival of Fisher's Ghost: Held annually in the Campbelltown CBD every November. Campbelltown's biggest Festival and one of the longest running Festivals in Australia, dating back to 1956. Featuring 10 days of family fun with more than 30 events, including a grand parade of community groups a street fair, music gigs and fireworks.
- Ingleburn Alive! Festival: Held annually in Oxford Road in the Northern suburb of Ingleburn in March. Free entertainment, rides and family activities, usually followed by a firework display in Milton park.
- Riverfest, held annually in August in Koshigaya Park, to raise awareness of the city's local environment and cultural diversity.

== See also ==
- Local government areas of New South Wales
