= Glenalvon House =

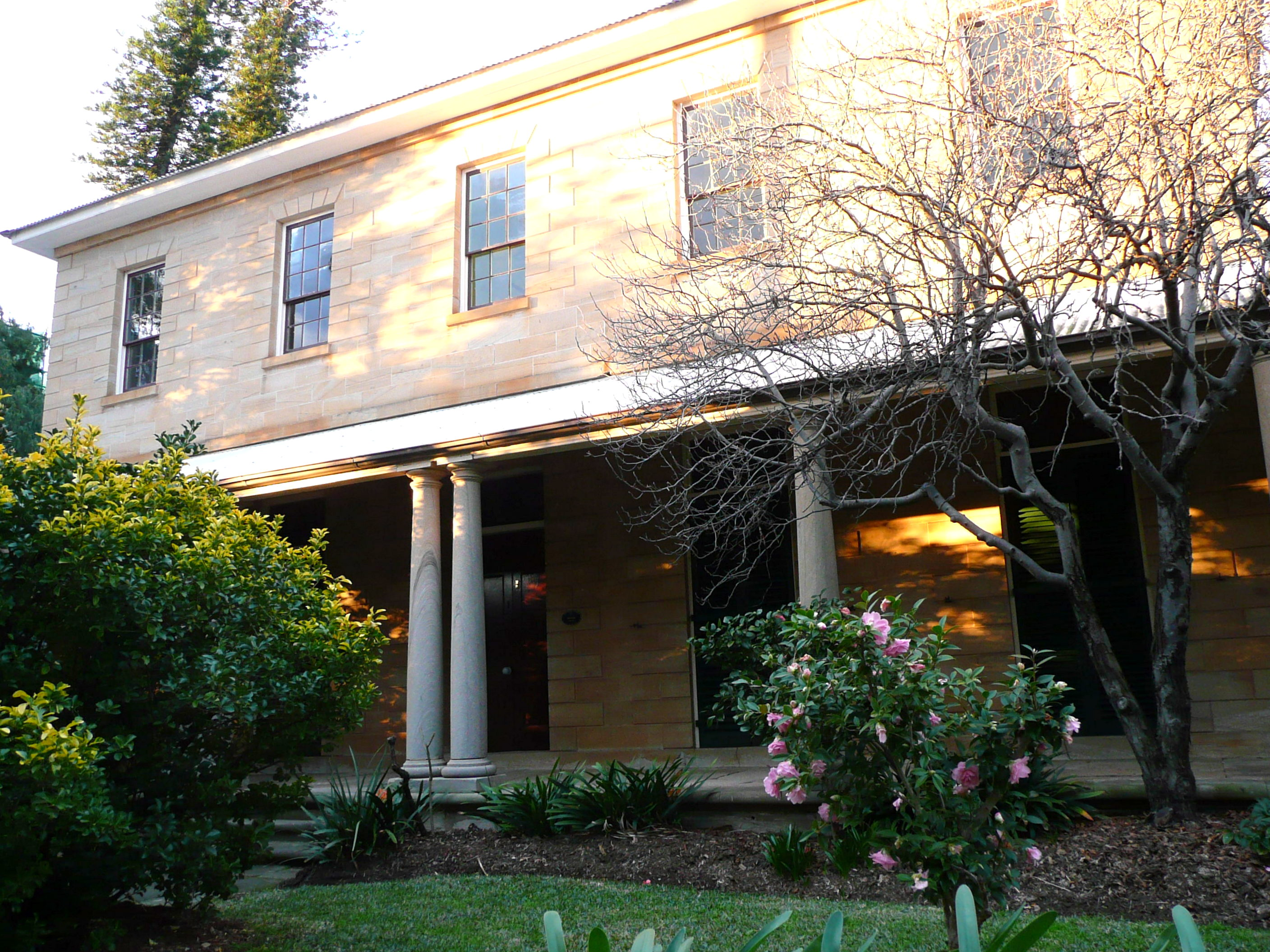
- Glenalvon, in 2009

- Location within Sydney
- 34°04′03″S 150°48′54″E
- Location: 8 Lithgow Street, Campbelltown, City of Campbelltown, New South Wales, Australia

History
- Built: 1841
- Built for: Michael Byrne

Site notes
- Architectural style: Georgian (Victorian)
- Owner: Department of Planning and Infrastructure
- Website: www.cahs.com.au/glenalvon.html

New South Wales Heritage Register
- Official name: Glenalvon; Glenalvon and Stables
- Type: State heritage (built)
- Criteria: a., c., d., e., f., g.
- Designated: 2 April 1999
- Reference no.: 4
- Type: House
- Category: Residential buildings (private)
- Builders: Michael Byrne

Glenalvon House is a heritage-listed homestead located at 8 Lithgow Street, Campbelltown, New South Wales, a suburb of Sydney, Australia. It was designed and built in 1841 by Michael Byrne. It is also known as Glenalvon and Glenalvon and Stables. The property is owned by Department of Planning and Infrastructure, an agency of the Government of New South Wales. It was added to the New South Wales State Heritage Register on 2 April 1999.

Glenalvon House and farm was the family home of Michael Byrne, a publican. The homestead in the Victorian Georgian style was built in 1840. The homestead is managed by Campbelltown and Airds Historical Society Inc. as a museum that is open to the public for a modest fee.

== History ==
The outline of the house is first shown on two town plans dated November 1840, although the stables are not shown at this time. It is thought that Michael Byrne, a publican, built the house around this time on the grant of 1 acre and 32 perches which was taken up in 1831. Although it is possible that the outbuildings were not shown, it is more likely that the stables were constructed later (which would be supported by the differing styles of the two buildings).

Michael Byrne was born in County Wicklow, near Dublin in 1800, the son of Hugh and Sarah Byrne. Hugh Byrne was convicted without trial and transported to Australia, with his family, in 1802 for treasonous practices in the 1798 Irish Rebellion. Michael Byrne was made an apprentice to Lawrence Butler, Irish overseer of the NSW Government Lumber Yards, Sydney. Michael Byrne went on to own seven pubs in Campbelltown. He was trialled, though not found guilty, of kicking a man to death for non-payment of a debt. Byrne himself was made insolvent in 1844, after having built in 1841, Glenalvon, the finest stone house in the town. He died in 1878 and is buried in the Irish corner of the Roman Catholic Cemetery in Campbelltown.

By the 1840s various members of the Byrne family were experiencing financial difficulties, including Michael who by 1844 owed his brother-in-law, John Keighran (publican) the sum of A£880 17s 3d. As partial payment of the debt John accepted the property in Lithgow Street and a 15-hectare (36-acre) farm also owned by Byrne. Keighran is believed to have taken up residence in Glenalvon, along with his wife Catherine Byrne, sometime in 1853. They would eventually have thirteen children there. Upon the death of both parents little more than a year apart in 1858, the property passed to two of their sons John and Patrick.

The property was mortgaged to pay the debts of the estate and the house was let to J. Kidd, JP, who remained in tenancy until 1878 when the property was sold to the Fieldhouse brothers. The Fieldhouse brothers were prominent businessmen in Campbelltown who owned over 44 properties within the town by 1884. From 1878 to 1891 "Glenalvin Hall" was the residence of Edwin Fieldhouse and his family. From 1891 to 1904 the property remained in the joint ownership of the brothers at the end of which time they divided their assets with Edwin retaining Glenalvon. Edwin vacated the house shortly after and it was variously tenanted until 1920 when it was sold to the Bursill Family.

Glenalvon remained in the ownership of the Bursill family until 1965 when it was acquired by the (then) State Planning Authority (SPA) for $35,000.

In 1969 architect John Fisher (member of the Institute of Architects, the Cumberland County Council Historic Buildings Committee and on the first Council of the National Trust of Australia (NSW) after its reformation in 1960) was commissioned by the State Planning Authority to restore the first five houses in Campbelltown, which had been resumed under the Cumberland County Planning Scheme. They included Glenalvon.

In 1970 the house and stables were restored by Clive Lucas at Fisher Jackson and Hudson and Lucas recalls this property as the conservation project where he first used the then innovative heritage principle of researching and understanding the fabric of a place before attempting conservation, including the use of paint scrapes to establish original paint schemes. The house was tenanted by the Oakham family from 1970 to 2010 and the stables are used as a resource centre by the Campbelltown and Airds District Historical Society.

The State Planning Authority sold Glenalvon to Campbelltown City Council and the Campbelltown & Airds District Historical Society now manage the building and garden, running displays, meetings, events.

== Description ==
Garden

The house is set in a mature garden, which contains some historic plantings including tall columnar Cook's pine (Araucaria columnaris), silky oak (Grevillea robusta) and Californian desert fan palm (Washingtonia robusta).

House

A two-storey Georgian finely cut sandstone residence with symmetrical facade. The front verandah is stone flagged and is supported by turned stone Doric style columns. The hipped roof, originally shingled, is now clad in corrugated iron. The main entrance is located centrally on the southern elevation and double verandah posts on either side emphasise the point of entry. There are shuttered French doors either side of the main entry, opening onto the verandah. The five windows to the upper floor are double hung, timber sashed and of 9 panes to both the upper and lower sashes. The rear of the house has a verandah supported by flat timber columns. To the rear (north) of the house is located the former stables consisting of a symmetrical rectangular sandstone building with central gable on the eastern facade containing the entry doors and loft doors above. The hipped and gabled roof is clad in corrugated iron sheeting and has decorative timber barge boards. The roof framings were noted in 1973 as being jointed, dowelled, pegged and numbered without the use of nails (NT Listing). The verandah and eaves have timber soffits. Cellars are located below the house.

Interior

Original cedar joinery, inc. six panelled doors, splayed panelled jambs to the windows and chimney pieces to the first floor; marble ground floor chimney pieces with sandstone mantlepieces; original geometric stair.

=== Condition ===
As at 1 February 1999, The building and grounds are in excellent condition, having undergone extensive conservation works in 1969. The property has been very well maintained since that time, although the garden is currently somewhat overgrown.

Glenalvon has survived with much of its significant 1840s fabric intact and the original curtilage and setting of the property can still be interpreted. The property has high overall integrity.

=== Modifications and dates ===
- 1969 – conservation and restoration of the building and grounds.

The site is currently being evaluated through the preparation of a detailed conservation management plan (CMP). A CMP has been finalised and endorsed by the Heritage Council on 24 July 2000.

== Heritage listing ==
As at 27 November 1998, Glenalvon is historically, aesthetically and socially significant as one of the oldest urban townhouses in the township of Campbelltown. The house and stables of Glenalvon are a significant landmark element. Glenalvon has been used continuously as a residence for almost 160 years and although some changes have been made to the house, much of the original fabric, dating from 1840, has survived intact. The landscape setting of the house is also important as it represents part of the original curtilage of the property and makes a major contribution to the historic townscape of Campbelltown.

Glenalvon House was listed on the New South Wales State Heritage Register on 2 April 1999 having satisfied the following criteria.

The place is important in demonstrating the course, or pattern, of cultural or natural history in New South Wales.

Glenalvon is of historical significance as one of the oldest uurban townhouses surviving in the township of Campbelltown. It is of further historical significance for it association with early and prominent families of the Campbelltown district and for its links to a way of life which has long since disappeared.

The place is important in demonstrating aesthetic characteristics and/or a high degree of creative or technical achievement in New South Wales.

Glenalvon is of high aesthetic significance as a particularly fine Colonial Georgian sandstone residence retaining much of its 1840s fabric intact. The stables buildings are also of high aesthetic significance as are the grounds which give an indication of the early curtilage of the property. The house combined with its grounds are important as reminders of the setting of early town houses with their generously landscaped grounds. Both the building and grounds make a considerable contribution to the historic townscape of Campbelltown.

The place has a strong or special association with a particular community or cultural group in New South Wales for social, cultural or spiritual reasons.

Glenalvon is of high social significance for its association with several prominent Campbelltown families and for its demonstration of the early pattern of life in the original township.

The place has potential to yield information that will contribute to an understanding of the cultural or natural history of New South Wales.

Glenalvon is of high technical/research significance for its demonstration of colonial building techniques and for its use of local building materials and craftsmen, particularly the stonemasons, some of whom were convicts.

The place possesses uncommon, rare or endangered aspects of the cultural or natural history of New South Wales.

Glenalvon is a rare surviving example of an 1840s townhouse to survive with much of its 1840s fabric and grounds intact, indicating the stature of such houses at the time of their construction.

The place is important in demonstrating the principal characteristics of a class of cultural or natural places/environments in New South Wales.

Glenalvon is an excellent example of an 1840s townhouse in the Colonial Georgian style.

== See also ==
- Australian residential architectural styles
