= Myrtle Hill =

Myrtle Hill may refer to:

== United Kingdom ==
- Myrtle Hill, a location in Myddfai community, Wales

== United States ==
- Boligee Hill, now known as Myrtle Hill, near Boligee, Alabama, listed on the National Register of Historic Places (NRHP)
- Myrtle Hill Cemetery, Rome, Georgia, a site of The 1793 Battle of Hightower, NRHP-listed
- Myrtle Hill (Owingsville, Kentucky), NRHP-listed
- Myrtle Hill Plantation House, Gloster, Louisiana, NRHP-listed
