= Appin Road =

Road in New South Wales, Australia

Appin Road New South Wales
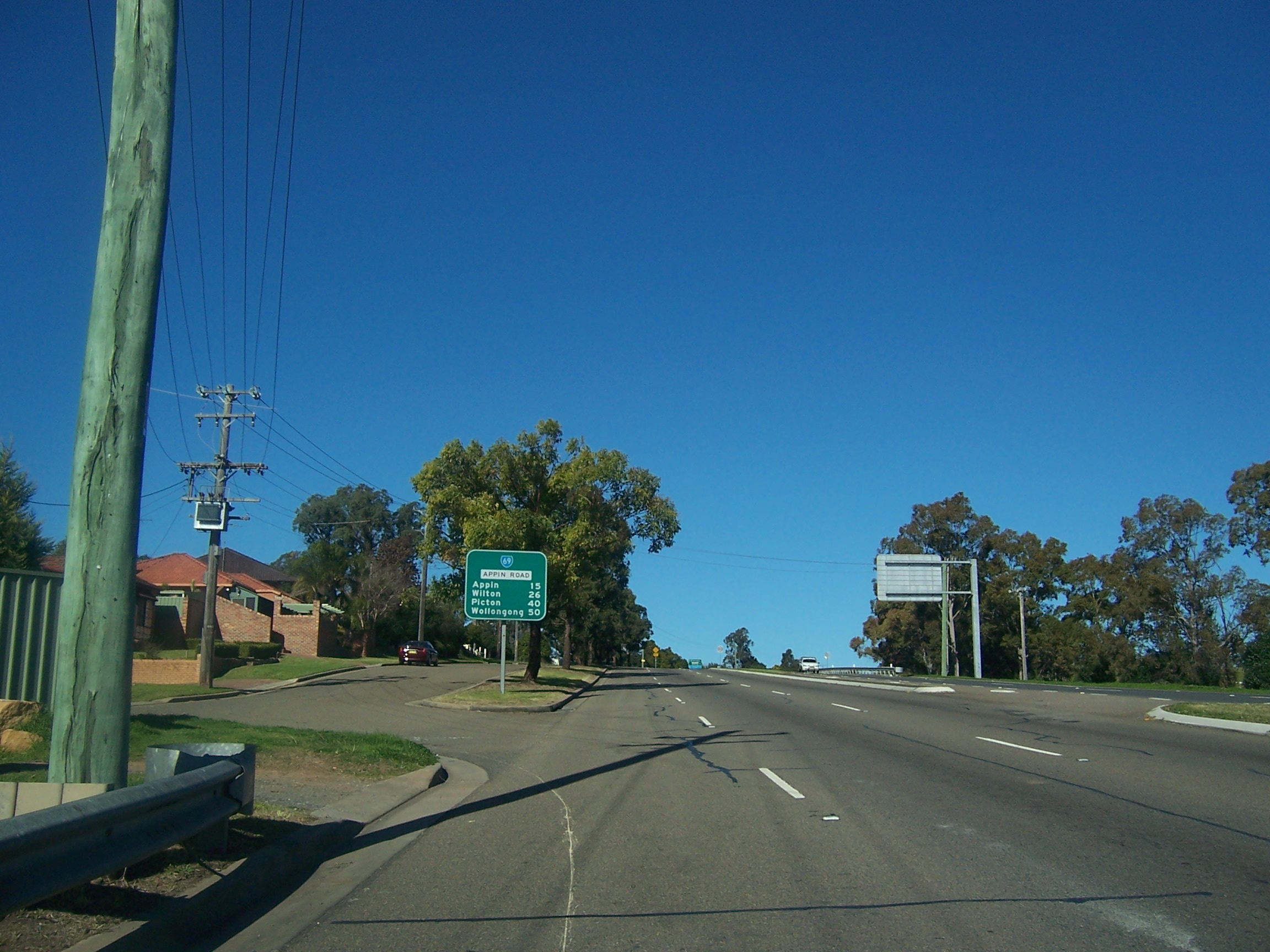
- Heading south along Appin Road, Campbelltown
- Coordinates: 34.074873°S 150.808326°E (North end); 34.305507°S 150.904315°E (South end)

General information
- Type: Road
- Length: 31.6 km (20 mi)
- Gazetted: August 1928
- Route number(s): B69 (2013–present)
- Former route number: State Route 69 (1974–2013)

Major junctions
- North end: Oxley Street; Campbelltown, Sydney
- Narellan Road; Wilton Road
- South end: Princes Motorway; Bulli Tops, New South Wales

Location(s)
- Major suburbs: Gilead, Appin

Appin Road is a New South Wales secondary highway linking Campbelltown and Sydney's western suburbs with Wollongong. It is named after Appin, which lies on its path.

== Route ==
Appin Road commences at the intersection with Oxley Street and Narellan Road in Campbelltown and heads in a southerly direction as a four-lane, dual-carriageway road, narrowing to a two-lane, single carriageway road at Rosemeadow, to Appin, before continuing in a south-easterly direction to the interchange with Princes Motorway at Bulli Tops, in the Illawarra region just north of Bulli.

== History ==
The passing of the Main Roads Act of 1924 through the Parliament of New South Wales provided for the declaration of Main Roads, roads partially funded by the State government through the Main Roads Board (later the Department of Main Roads, and eventually Transport for NSW). Main Road No. 177 was declared along this road on 8 August 1928, from the intersection with Narellan Road in Campbelltown, via Appin to the intersection with Princes Highway near the top of Bull Pass (and continuing north along Campbelltown Road to the intersection with Hume Highway at Crossroads); with the passing of the Main Roads (Amendment) Act of 1929 to provide for additional declarations of State Highways and Trunk Roads, this was amended to Main Road 177 on 8 April 1929.

The passing of the Roads Act of 1993 updated road classifications and the way they could be declared within New South Wales. Under this act, Appin Road retains its declaration as part of Main Road 177.

The route was allocated State Route 69 in 1974. With the conversion to the newer alphanumeric system in 2013, this was replaced with route B69.

== Major intersections ==
LGA	Location	km	mi	Destinations	Notes
Campbelltown	Campbelltown–Bradbury boundary	0.0	0.0	Oxley Street (north) – Campbelltown, Leumeah, Casula	Northern terminus of road
Campbelltown	Campbelltown–Bradbury boundary	0.0	0.0	Narellan Road (B69 west) – Narellan, Penrith, Windsor to Hume Motorway (M31) – Prestons, Mittagong, Goulburn	Route B69 continues west along Narellan Road
Campbelltown	Campbelltown–Bradbury boundary	0.0	0.0	The Parkway (east) – Bradbury	
Wollondilly	Appin	14.7	9.1	Wilton Road – Wilton, Picton	
Georges River		15.9	9.9	Kings Falls Bridge	
Wollondilly	Bulli Tops	31.6	19.6	Princes Motorway (M1) – Bulli, Wollongong, Albion Park	Southern terminus of road and route B69
Route transition

== See also ==
- Highways in Australia
- Highways in New South Wales
