= Guildford (1810 ship) =

Convict ship that transported convicts to Australia (1810)

History

United Kingdom
- Name: Guildford
- Namesake: Guildford
- Owner: James Mangles
- Builder: Wells, Wigram & Green, Blackwall
- Launched: 6 June 1810
- Fate: Lost with all on board in 1831 on voyage from Singapore to England

General characteristics
- Tons burthen: 521, or 52151/94, or 528, or 533 (bm)
- Length: 123 ft 8 in (37.7 m)
- Beam: 31 ft 0 in (9.4 m)
- Propulsion: Sail
- Complement: 40
- Armament: 1810: 12 × 12-pounder carronades; 1811: 16 × 12-pounder guns

Guildford was a two-decker merchant ship launched in 1810. She transported convicts to New South Wales. Of her eight voyages delivering convicts, for three she was under charter to the British East India Company (EIC). She underwent major repairs in 1819, her hull was sheathed in copper in 1822; in 1825 she received new wales, top sides and deck, the copper was repaired and other repairs. Guildford was lost without a trace in 1831.

== Voyages ==
Guildford entered the Register of Shipping in 1810 with Johnson, master, Mangles, owner, and trade London—Jamaica.

Magnus Johnson was Guildford's captain on her first seven voyages. On 4 July 1811 he received a letter of marque, which authorised Guildford, while under his command, to engage in offensive, and not just defensive, action against the French.

=== First convict voyage (1811-1813) ===
On her first convict voyage, Guildford left London on 3 September 1811 in company with General Graham. She reached Rio de Janeiro on 27 October, and arrived at Port Jackson on 18 January 1812. Guildford carried 200 male convicts, one of whom died during the voyage.

Guildford departed Port Jackson bound for Bengal on 29 March 1812. By 6 June Guildford had arrived at Calcutta. Homeward bound and under charter to the EIC, on 24 August she passed Saugor. She reached the Cape on 9 December and St Helena on 1 January 1813, and arrived at the Downs on 14 May.

She was next reported to have left St Helena on 22 December 1814 in company with the whaler Spring Grove. Guildford parted from Spring Grove at 10°N 25°W, and arrived back at Gravesend on 31 January 1815.

=== Second convict voyage (1815-1816) ===
On her second convict voyage, Guildford left Ireland in 1815 and arrived at Port Jackson on 8 April 1816. She embarked with 228 male convicts, one of whom died on the voyage. Guildford left on 23 June, bound for Batavia.

=== Third convict voyage (1817-1818) ===
On her third convict voyage, Guildford left Cork on 14 November 1817. She travelled via Rio de Janeiro and arrived at Port Jackson on 1 April 1818. She embarked 200 male convicts, one of whom died during the voyage.

=== Fourth convict voyage (1820-1821) ===
On her fourth convict voyage, Guildford left Portsmouth on 14 May 1820, with 190 male convicts (Surgeon Superintendent, Dr. Hugh Walker). She travelled via Simon's Town (Cape Town's winter naval base at the time), where she picked up four additional convicts (making a total of 194 convicts transported), and arrived at Port Jackson on 30 September. Only five convicts were taken off in Sydney; she landed the other 188 in Van Diemen's Land after she arrived at Hobart on 28 October 1820. No convicts died on Guildford's fourth journey.

=== Fifth convict voyage (1822) ===
On her fifth convict voyage, Guildford left London on 7 April 1822, arrived at Port Jackson on 15 July. She embarked 190 male convicts, one of whom died during the voyage.

=== Sixth convict voyage (1823-1824) ===
On her sixth convict voyage, Guildford left Portsmouth on 18 August 1823, and arrived at Port Jackson on 5 March 1824. Guildford sprang a leak after leaving Teneriffe. When she arrived at Rio de Janeiro she had to be repaired. During the work, which took some two months, a hulk that the Brazilian government provided housed the convicts and their guards. Guildford embarked 160 male convicts, one of whom died an accidental death during the voyage.

On her return to England, Guildford underwent a thorough repair. The EIC required that before she sailed for the Company she undergo a dry-dock survey, which she passed. At this time, Magnus Johnson and James Mangles acquired Guildford.

=== EIC voyage (1825-1826) ===
Next, Guildford made a voyage to Madras and Bengal for the EIC. Magnus Johnson was still her captain and he left Torbay on 26 May 1825. Guildford reached Madras on 5 September and then went on to Calcutta. On her return voyage she reached Madras on 11 January 1826 and St Helena on 23 March, and arrived at the Downs on 30 May.

=== Seventh convict voyage (1827-1828) ===
For her seventh convict voyage, Mangles and the EIC agreed a freight rate of £10 10s for Guildford to bring home teas from China.

Guildford left Plymouth on 31 March 1827, arrived at Port Jackson on 25 July. She had embarked 190 male convicts, one of whom died during the voyage. Guildford then sailed to China, arriving at Whampoa on 13 November 1827. For her homeward voyage for the EIC she crossed the Second Bar, about 20 miles (32 km) downriver from Whampoa, on 5 December, reached St Helena on 18 February 1828, and arrived at the Downs on 12 April.

Although the 1829 Lloyd's Register still showed Mangles as Guildford's owner, the 1830 edition of the Register of Shipping showed her new owner as T. Ward, and her master as Harrison.

=== Eighth convict voyage (1829-1830) ===
Under the command of Robert Harrison, Guildford left Dublin, Ireland on 12 July 1829, on her eighth convict voyage. She arrived at Port Jackson on 4 November. She embarked 200 male convicts, four of whom died during the voyage. Guildford left Port Jackson on 19 January 1830, bound for Bombay. She was carrying a detachment of soldiers for India that she delivered on 14 April 1830. Harrison then sailed for China.

== Fate ==
Guildford left China on 14 November 1830 and Singapore on 29 December homeward bound to England. She was wrecked in the Indian Ocean (approximately 7°N 80°E) in late April or early May 1831 with the ultimate loss of all on board. On 8 May, Margaret sighted the wreck of the ship. A raft constructed from the ship's rigging was also sighted, but nobody was on board. The entry for Guildford in the 1832 volume of the Register of Shipping has the notation "LOST" appended.
