= Bradbury, New South Wales =

Bradbury
- Suburb
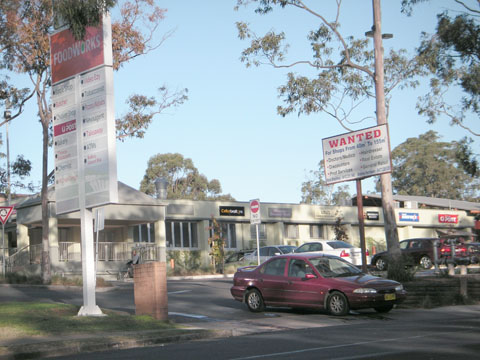
- Bradbury Shopping Centre

- Interactive map of Bradbury
- Country: Australia
- State: New South Wales
- City: Sydney
- LGA: City of Campbelltown
- Location: 54 km (34 mi) south-west of Sydney CBD
- Established: 1969

Government
  - State electorate: Campbelltown
  - Federal division: Macarthur

Area
  - Total: 3.6 km^{2} (1.4 sq mi)
- Elevation: 108 m (354 ft)

Population
  - Total: 9,433 (2021 census)
  - Density: 2,620/km^{2} (6,790/sq mi)
- Postcode: 2560
Suburbs around Bradbury
| Campbelltown | Campbelltown | Campbelltown |
| Ambarvale | Bradbury | Airds |
| Rosemeadow | St Helens Park | St Helens Park |

Bradbury is a suburb of Sydney, in the state of New South Wales, Australia. Bradbury is located 54 kilometres south-west of the Sydney central business district, in the local government area of the City of Campbelltown and is part of the Macarthur region.

The suburb features many areas of greenery with native trees characterising most streets. Many streets are home to a range of native trees. Most of the street names in the suburb are after types of trees such as Bottlebrush Avenue, Jacaranda Avenue, Stringybark Place and Ash Place.

== History ==
Bradbury was previously known as Sherwood Hills and is one of the more established suburbs of Campbelltown, with large-scale residential development beginning in the 1960s, planned by George Clarke and developed by Lend Lease. It is one of the earliest suburbs to underground powerlines, provide sewer and design streets to slow car speeds.

The suburb was named after William Bradbury, a local innkeeper in the 1820s and 1830s. The area surrounding Manooka Reserve (beside The Parkway) was originally called Manooka Estate, but became part of Bradbury in the 1970s.

Bradbury is said to be the location where Fisher's ghost (Frederick Fisher) appeared on a bridge post, to indicate where his body lay. The name of the creek that runs through the suburb is called Fishers Ghost Creek.

In June 2023, the suburb boundaries with Campbelltown and Airds were amended, with Bradbury losing some area to Campbelltown but gaining some area from Airds. The new Campbelltown-Bradbury boundary followed the alignments of Jacka Street, Tubb Street and Cartwright Crescent. However, in November 2024, this boundary was changed again, with Bradbury losing the areas east of this boundary to Airds.

== People ==
According to the 2021 census of population, there were 9,433 residents in Bradbury.

- Aboriginal and Torres Strait Islander people made up 5.6% of the population.
- 70.3% of people were born in Australia. The next most common countries of birth were New Zealand 2.7%, England 2.7% and Philippines 1.6%.
- 73.0% of people spoke only English at home. Other languages spoken at home included Arabic 3.7%, Bengali 1.5% and Samoan 1.1%.
- The most common responses for religion were No Religion 30.3%, Catholic 23.1% and Anglican 13.1%.

=== Notable residents ===
- Samuel Rouen (born 1988) – Winner of Season 3 of the Australian version of The Biggest Loser.

== Sport and recreation ==
Bradbury features a swimming complex called Bradbury Pools - which includes one large outdoor Olympic sized swimming pool, a children's wading pool, and two indoor pools (one heated, and one regular). Also in the suburb are several ovals, which support the local Rugby League team- Campbelltown Collegians and cricket team- Bradbury for both matches and training.

== Transport ==
Transit Systems runs a bus service through the area, chiefly with the route numbers 885 and 886.
