= Airds =

- Suburb
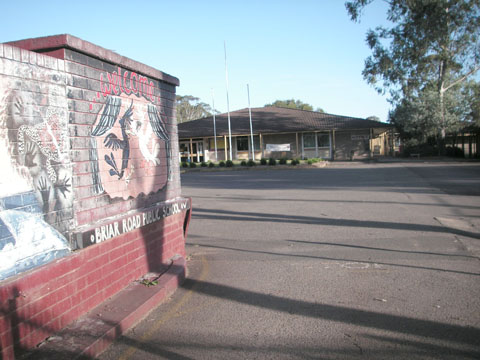
- Briar Road Public School

- Interactive map of Airds
- Country: Australia
- State: New South Wales
- Region: Macarthur Region
- City: Sydney
- LGA: City of Campbelltown
- Location: 56 km (35 mi) south-west of Sydney CBD

Government
  - State electorate: Campbelltown
  - Federal division: Macarthur
- Elevation: 141 m (463 ft)

Population
  - Total: 3,265 (2021 census)
- Postcode: 2560
Suburbs around Airds
Campbelltown	Ruse	Kentlyn
Bradbury	Airds	Holsworthy
Bradbury	St Helens Park	Holsworthy

Airds is a predominantly residential suburb of Sydney in the City of Campbelltown local government area in New South Wales Australia. Houses within the suburb are owned by Housing NSW. The land and houses are being sold off to a company and the area redeveloped to build private housing. Public Housing will only be about 30% of the area.

== History ==
Governor Lachlan Macquarie named the region Airds, after the Scottish family estate of his wife Elizabeth.

Airds appeared in land grant lists, and referred to almost the entire area between Glenfield and Gilead. The name fell into disuse as Campbelltown and other settlements along the valley floor came to be known by their individual names after the 1820s.

In January 1975, tenders for the first homes in the Housing Commission's "Kentlyn" subdivision were called but the name Airds was not approved until May 1976. Like many public housing estates in Sydney, Airds was constructed on American Radburn principles designed to separate traffic from pedestrians. As a result, houses in the suburb did not face roads, which was later found to create enormous problems relating to crime and passive surveillance in the suburb. It is one of the most socially disadvantaged suburbs of Sydney.

In June 2023, the suburb boundary with Bradbury was amended, with Airds losing some area to Bradbury. In November 2024, there was another amendment to the boundary, with Airds gaining further areas from Bradbury and the suburb began to border Campbelltown along Jacka Street, Tubb Street and Cartwright Crescent.

== Demographics ==
According to the 2021 census of the population, there were 3,265 residents in Airds.

- Aboriginal and Torres Strait Islander people made up 15.5% of the population.
- 63.4% of people were born in Australia.
- 60.9% of people only spoke English at home. Other languages spoken at home included Arabic, spoken by 5.3% of residents.
- The most common responses for religion were No Religion 30.1%, Catholic 15.3% and Anglican 11.0%.
- Single parent families accounted for 43.5% of all families in the suburb, nearly three times the national average (15.9%).

== Schools ==
Schools in the suburb include:

- John Warby Public School
- Briar Road Public School
- Airds High School

== Urban planning and renewal ==
The Airds Renewal Project environmental assessment report says the project will make the suburbs "a great place to live, a place with good services and facilities in a socially mixed community offering opportunities for residents to realise their goals".

This will involve taking the area from 94 per cent public housing to only 30 per cent.

"As a result of this concentration of disadvantage, the community of Airds experiences a range of social issues including high unemployment and poor health, low income, high percentage of single parent families, a lack of access to educational opportunities and other services and high crime rates," the report says.

The report concludes that planned changes to the neighbourhood will have many positive social impacts.

More than 500 houses will be demolished, 1000 new homes and 52 seniors housing units will be built, new roads will go in and community facilities, public areas and parks will get a makeover.

== Services based in Airds ==
=== Airds Bradbury Renewal Project ===
- Airds contains the Reiby Juvenile Detention Center

=== Airds/Bradbury Men's Shed ===
The men's shed supports the community by creating a space providing "activity, identity and meaning" for its members.

== WorkVentures Connect Centre at Airds ==
WorkVentures Connect Centre at Airds runs free training and skills programs and support in finding employment for local residents. The centre offers free access to computers and the internet, and access to free legal and tenancy advice for Housing NSW residents.

The Connect Centre at Airds is one of two centres run by WorkVentures in the Campbelltown area.

== Master-Plan Group ==
Meets to try to make sure that Housing N.S.W's relocation works for tenants.

== A B Central ==
A hub for community renewal projects and activities. The Housing N.S.W Airds Bradbury renewal team is based here as well.
