= Epping =

Epping may refer to:

== Places ==
=== Australia ===
- Epping, New South Wales, a suburb of Sydney
  - Epping railway station, Sydney
- Electoral district of Epping, the corresponding seat in the New South Wales Legislative Assembly
- Epping Forest, Kearns, a heritage-listed former farm and residence in Kearns, NSW
- Epping, Victoria, a suburb of Melbourne
  - Epping railway line, the name before 2012 of the Mernda railway line
  - Epping railway station, Melbourne
- Epping Forest National Park, Queensland

=== France ===
- Epping, Moselle, a commune

=== South Africa ===
- Epping, Cape Town, an industrial area

=== United States ===
- Epping, New Hampshire, a New England town
  - Epping (CDP), New Hampshire, the main village in the town
- Epping, North Dakota

=== United Kingdom ===
- Epping, Essex, England
  - Epping (UK Parliament constituency), extant 1885 to 1974
  - Epping Forest
  - Epping tube station, terminus of the Central Line
  - Epping Upland, a village, formerly called just "Epping"

== People ==
- John Epping (born 1983), Canadian curler
- Joseph Epping (1835-1894), German Jesuit astronomer and Assyriologist
- Randy Charles Epping, American author
- Rick Epping, American musician

== See also ==
- Epping Forest (disambiguation)
- Epping station (disambiguation)
