= Robert Townson High School =

Location
- Thunderbolt Drive, Raby, South Western Sydney, New South Wales; Australia; 34°00′56″S 150°49′03″E

Information
- Type: Government-funded co-educational comprehensive secondary day school
- Established: 1987; 39 years ago
- School district: St Andrews; Regional South
- Educational authority: New South Wales Department of Education
- Principal: Adam Kerr
- Teaching staff: 58.4 FTE (2018)
- Years: 7–12
- Enrolment: 727 (2018)
- Campus: Suburban
- Colours: Maroon, yellow and white
- Website: roberttown-h.schools.nsw.gov.au

Robert Townson High School is a government-funded co-educational comprehensive secondary day school, located on Thunderbolt Drive in Raby, a south-western suburb of Sydney, New South Wales, Australia.

Established in 1987 to meet the demands of the growing suburbs of Raby, St Andrews, Kearns, and Eschol Park, the school enrolled approximately 730 students in 2018, from Year 7 to Year 12, of whom six percent identified as Indigenous Australians and 41 percent were from a language background other than English. The school is operated by the NSW Department of Education; the principal is Adam Kerr.

== History ==
Both the High School and adjacent Primary School take their name from Robert Townson, an English scholar and scientist who settled in Colonial New South Wales and was a local farmer and land owner.

From approximately 1990 to 1995 Anoulack Chanthivong Minister for Better Regulation and Fair Trading attended Robert Townson Highschool. In the Front Office of Robert Townson High, a plaque is dedicated to him.

== See also ==
- List of government schools in New South Wales: Q–Z
- Education in Australia
