= Varroville (homestead) =

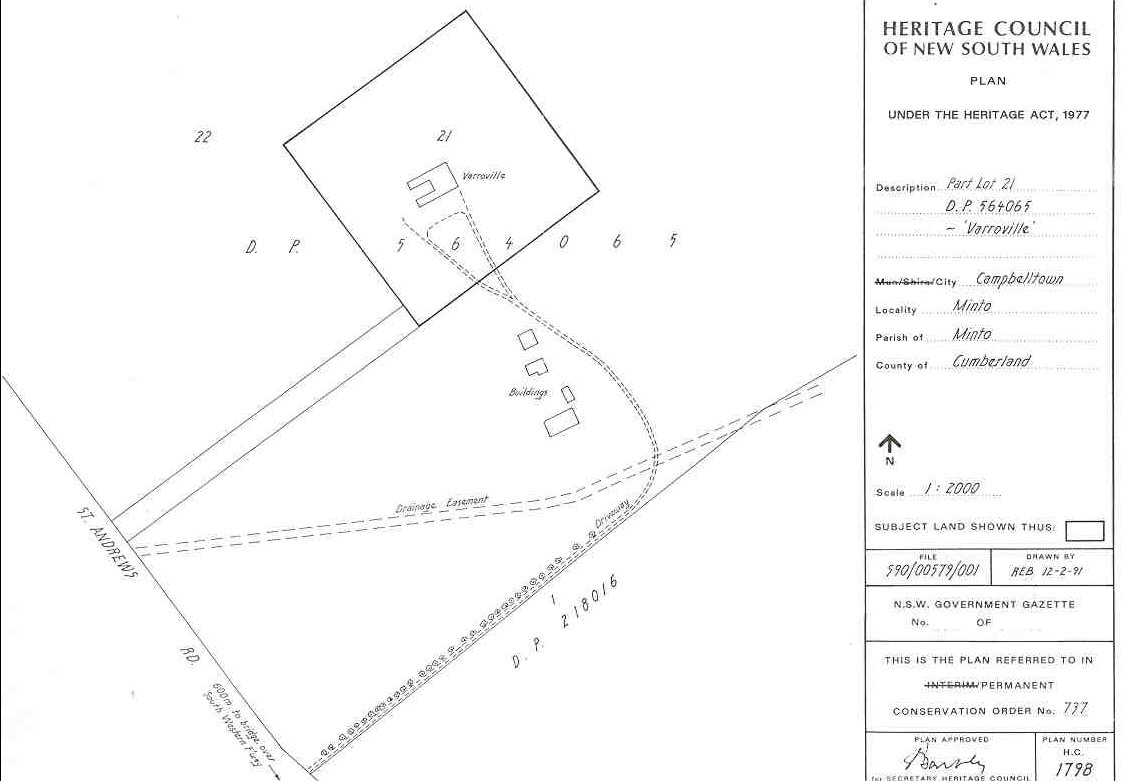
- Heritage boundaries

- Location within Sydney Location within Australia
- 34°00′14″S 150°49′34″E
- Location: 196 St Andrews Road, Varroville, New South Wales, Australia

History
- Built: 1810–1859

Site notes
- Architect(s): Weaver and Kemp

New South Wales Heritage Register
- Official name: Varroville; Varro Ville; Varra Ville
- Type: State heritage (complex / group)
- Designated: 2 April 1999
- Reference no.: 737
- Type: Homestead Complex
- Category: Farming and Grazing

Varroville is a heritage-listed former farm and now rural residence at 196 St Andrews Road, Varroville, New South Wales, Australia. It was designed by Weaver and Kemp and built from 1810 to 1859. It is also known as Varro Ville and Varra Ville. The property is privately owned. It was added to the New South Wales State Heritage Register on 2 April 1999.

== History ==
=== The Cowpastures ===
When the First Fleet arrived in Sydney Cove in 1788, they found the soil unsuitable for farming and soon looked towards the heavy clay and loam soils of the Cumberland Plain (to the west) to sustain the colony. Early agricultural settlements were located on the rich alluvial soils of the Nepean, Hawkesbury and Georges River areas, as well as South Creek near St Marys and at the head of the Parramatta River, where the settlement of Rose Hill (later Parramatta) was established about six months after the fleet landed. A settlement at the Hawkesbury was established in 1794.

By 1804 much of the Cumberland Plain had been settled and Governor King began to look for other regions in the colony for favourable arable land. The only suitable land within the Cumberland Plain was the area known as the Cowpastures, located in the southwestern corner. This area was named after the discovery in 1795 of cows from the first fleet which had wandered off into the bush. The Cowpastures had remained unoccupied due to the official decree that reserved the land for the wild cattle (to encourage their increase).

In December 1803 Governor and Mrs King visited the Cowpastures for themselves and the Sydney Gazette reported that Mrs King was the first white lady to have crossed the Nepean River. The track to the Cowpastures led from Prospect and on 17 September 1805 James Meehan, under instructions from Governor King, commenced a survey of the track from Prospect to the Nepean Crossing and a rough road followed the marked line. This became known as Cowpasture Road, later the Hume Highway, most of which is today part of the Camden Valley Way.

Several visits to the area by the colonial gentry took place at this time, which resulted in their desire to acquire some of this rich land for themselves. They saw the area as containing very good grazing land. Captain Henry Waterhouse described the area in a letter to John Macarthur in 1804 as follows: "I am at a loss to describe the face of the country other than as a beautiful park, totally divested of underwood, interspersed with plains, with rich luxuriant grass".

Earlier Europeans had described "large ponds covered with ducks and the black swan, the margins of which were fringed with shrubs of the most delightful tints". The Europeans thought the flats were perfect for cattle and the hills would carry sheep. They admired the absence of underbush - probably achieved through Aboriginal burning off - and felt comfortable with a landscape that reminded them of an English gentleman's park.

John Macarthur received the first land grant in the Cowpastures region in 1805 for his role in the early wool industry in the colony. Lord Camden rewarded him with 4,047 hectares (10,000 acres) and Macarthur chose the highly coveted Cowpastures for his grant, though Governor King tried to prevent him taking it. Macarthur also organised an 809-hectare (2,000-acre) grant for his friend Walter Davidson, who allowed Macarthur to use his land freely after Davidson returned to England. In this manner Macarthur controlled 19 kilometres (12 mi) of riverbank on the site where the wild cattle had first discovered the best pasture near Sydney. Later purchases and exchanges increased the Macarthur land there to over 10,927 hectares (27,000 acres), an endowment that Governor Macquarie greatly resented.

Other early grants were in the Parishes of Minto and in adjoining Evan, Bringelly, Narellan and Cook. These all lay west of Parramatta.

Governor Macquarie drew up plans in 1820 for establishment of a town in the area, to be named Campbelltown after his wife Elizabeth's maiden name. With their forced return to England in 1822 these plans never came to fruition and it was not until the arrival of Governor Darling in 1827 that plans were again reinstated and the first settlers were allowed to take possession of their town land in 1831. In the early 1850s the railway line from Sydney to Goulburn was completed, with Campbelltown station opening in 1858. When Leppington House was offered for lease in 1865, one of its selling points was that it was near a railway. Campbelltown now provided easy access to Sydney and its markets and grew as the centre of the district. Although Camden was established in 1836, with no railway line it remained a small town.

The large estates that flanked Cowpasture Road (later Camden Valley Way) and the Northern Road were run largely as sheep and cattle farms, with wheat and other grain crops being grown as well until the 1850s. The houses were often built on surrounding ridges or hills, providing sweeping views of the countryside and ensuring that any passing traveller could appreciate the owner's status by viewing their impressive country mansions from the road. This land use pattern of large farm estates and small towns, established in the nineteenth century, remained largely the pattern of development of the area up until the late 1990s. Aerial photographs of the area in 1947 show a rural landscape with some limited urban development on either side of the Camden Valley Way (then the Hume Highway).

=== Townson of Varroville ===
Robert Townson was born c. 1763 in Shropshire, developing interests in mineralogy and natural sciences young. Elected a non-resident member or Fellow of the Royal Society of Edinburgh in 1791, Physical class. He graduated M.D. at the University of Göttingen in 1795. Over 8–9 years he travelled extensively in Europe, from Trondheim in the north to Sicily, studying mineralogy, chemistry, botany, rural economy, technology, politics and ethics in the Universities of Göttingen, Vienna, Paris and Edinburgh. His "Travels in Hungary" was published in 1797, his 1798 "The Philosophy of Mineralogy" and a paper on the "perceptivity of Plants" was read in 1792 and included in the "Transactions" of the Linnaean Society.

In July 1807 Townson (d.1827), doctor of law and gentleman scientist arrived in Sydney. He had been elected a fellow of the Royal Society of Edinburgh and visited the universities of Copenhagen, Uppsala and Göttingen. In 1792 he contributed a paper to the Linnean Society of London on the "Perceptivity of Plants". "He was often at the home of Sir Joseph Banks and had there met William Paterson of the New South Wales Corps. His brother, Captain John Townson had served as a military officer in NSW before migrating to the colony as a settler in 1806, so he had ample opportunities to learn about the new settlement. Robert approached the British government for permission to settle in NSW. He was warmly received, informed that he was the type most urgently needed in the colony, promised land and indulgences, and allowed £100 to buy books and a laboratory for the colony. Dr Townson arrived in Sydney in the Young William on 7 July 1807. Proficient in all branches of natural science and also in Latin, Greek, German, French, he was the most eminent scholar in the young colony."

Townson arrived as a settler intending to establish himself as a pastoralist and trader in 1807. He arrived with the instructions of the British Secretary of State to Governor Bligh to grant him 809 hectares (2,000 acres). Bligh refused to "locate the grant", but allowed him occupancy while awaiting instructions from England, which arrived in a letter of 31 December 1807. He established himself on a small estate of 31 hectares (77 acres) on the banks of the Georges River, living there for about five years, building a residence, stock yard, making and enclosing paddocks and making roads. He called this grant Towweery (Tom Uglys).

In January 1808 Townson, affronted at Bligh's delay over the granting of land, became 'an opponent of Bligh, and when rebellion took place some months later he was judged one of the principal six "who previously concerted together with Major Johnston the arrest and imprisonment of the Governor". He was present at the dinner at the officers' mess on the eve of the trial of John Macarthur which precipitated the revolt [and] he signed the requisition to Johnston to depose Bligh on 26 January 1808' He "soon fell out with the rebel administration. Johnston refused to give him the land he wanted at Emu Island, near Penrith; though he was given 809 hectares (2,000 acres) at Botany Bay near the present Blakehurst and twenty-eight government cattle, he claimed that only half the grant was of any use, and his long complaints against Bligh written in 1807 and 1808 were followed by another, equally querulous, in 1809 against his supplanters."

Overlooked in the grants made by Johnston in 1808, he received two grants from Foveaux in November 1808, both in the Botany Bay district, one of 30 hectares (75 acres), the other of 779 hectares (1,925 acres) around the present Oatley station, Mortdale, Penshurst and Hurstville.' He had six assigned convicts.

In 1809, finding this [Botany Bay] land unsuitable he applied to William Paterson (who took over the government) for some adjacent land, of 194 hectares (480 acres). Since his land had poor pasture, he was obliged to send his flock away to other ground, and a few months before Macquarie's arrival he asked Paterson to allow him to exchange 324 hectares (800 acres) of his grant for some more open land "in a distant part of the colony". Paterson allowed him to take up 405 hectares (1,000 acres) for the 324 hectares (800 acres), giving him a total of 1,085 hectares (2,680 acres). This 405 hectares (1,000 acres) he chose was in the Minto district, and was the origin of Varro Ville.

James Meehan surveyed Varro Ville in August 1809, mentioning the hill of Bunbury Curran, a range, flats and hollows, hills and dales, ponds and ironbark trees, and the creek. A road was to be reserved on the south-east side. The grant was ready for delivery in November 1809'. 'Townson later confirmed that he had immediately occupied the land, "employed a great deal of labour, and expended a great deal of money" in building a horse yard, cultivating a large garden, clearing and fencing paddock and making roads.

Macquarie on his arrival annulled by public proclamation the trials which had taken place during the usurpation (of Bligh). Grants of land and of stock and leases during the same period were revoked, as well as pardons and emancipations until he could tour all the districts and reconsider the grants. Townson was required to hand in his grants, which he did in 1810. Macquarie re-granted Townson 405 hectares (1,000 acres) at Bunbury Curran (809 hectares (2,000 acres) at Minto (405 hectares (1,000 acres) at "Bunbury Curran" as it was called) and Botany Bay were given in May 1811, despite Townson's objections about the amount of land required to be cultivated)), which Townson named Varro Ville after the Roman writer on agriculture, Marcus Terentius Varro (116–27 BC). The stated reason was that Varro wrote extensively on agriculture and Townson was intent on making Varroville an exemplar of agricultural pursuit, which, according to his obituaries and official biography, he achieved.

In November 1810 Governor Macquarie toured the area (after having chosen the site of a town on George's River to which he gave the name Liverpool, after the Earl of that title following the foundation of Liverpool, and writes in his journal of 8 November 1810:

'[Finding] Mrs M had gone after returning home to see Dr Townson's farm and Bunbury Curran Hill we all followed her thither, and met her returning home again after having ascended the Hill, accompanied by her guide Mr. Meehan [Surveyor and owner of Macquarie Field]. The accounts given to me by Mrs M. of the beautiful prospect she had from the top of Bunbury Curran Hill induced me to ascend it, which I did on horseback, and was highly gratified with the noble extensive view I had from the top of it of the surrounding country. On my return from the Hill, we overtook Mrs M. on Dr Townson's farm, where we stopt for a few minutes to speak to the Doctor and look at a very ill chosen situation he has fixed on for the site of his new intended house'.

— Lachlan Macquarie, 8 November 1810.

Macquarie also commented in his journal that the farms of Townson and Andrew Thompson (St. Andrews farm, opposite Varroville) were "by far the finest soil and best pasturage I have yet seen in the colony; the grounds are beautiful and bounded by a large creek of brackish water called Bunbury Curran". This difference of opinion on siting reflects the different characters of Macquarie and Townson – the former masterful and dashing, would have chosen a prominent site with an extensive view, the latter a scholar, preferring seclusion and proximity to oversight his crops and orchard.

Varro was a famous man of letters. Authors like Quintilian considered him "the most learned of the Romans". He wrote 74 works on 620 papyrus rolls on several subjects, but practically none have survived. His lost "On Libraries", in which he describes the organisation of a library and gives reasons for defining books as cultural artefacts, is one of the earliest discussions of the subject.

Since these grants were made on the customary condition that the land be cultivated and not sold for five years, Townson again felt aggrieved. He had been living on his capital for nearly four years and was afraid of penury. He sought permission to sell his land and return to England. In the end he remained but developed a psychopathic personality. He subordinated everything to the development of his farms, shut himself off from society and apparently did no scientific work in New South Wales. He became "singular" and eccentric and his rigid economy became a byword. He also nursed undue hostility towards all who had contributed to his critical situation; Macquarie described him as "discontented" and one of his leading opponents, though there is no evidence that Townson took part in intrigues against him'.

March 1812 'In March 1812 it would appear that Townson had not yet built his house. "This state of uncertainty (over the route of a public road St Andrews road, linking the Liverpool-Campbelltown road with the Cowpasture Road has prevented me from going on with my plans and I am still living, when at Bunbury Curran, in a very uncomfortable manner, as on this road depends where I shall place my house and make my inclosures.

After five years at his small grant of 31 hectares (77 acres) at Towweery (Tom Ugly's) on George's River, Townson had relocated to Minto by 1813 and had made the "necessary establishment" there. He had managed to keep his six convicts for five years on the Government stores (when new settlers were normally allowed men on the stores for only 18 months), gaining extensions from Macquarie in 1810 and 1811.

Townson was associated with the development of the Australian wine industry, having been once known as 'the finest orchard in the Colony and a vineyard second only to Gregory Blaxland's' at Brush Farm, Ryde. He made very good use of his grant of 405 hectares (1,000 acres) at Minto. "Black Muscardelle" grapes were cultivated and liberally distributed by merchant and viticulturist Robert Campbell. Robert Townson made a "passable sweet wine" from this grape at Bunbury Curran near 'Campbell-Town'and possibly also grew "Black Portugal" or 'Oporto'(i.e. Varroville).

In 1815 Townson supplied meat to the Sydney, Liverpool and Parramatta stores. In the 1818 Muster of stock for 1818 "Townson had 214 head of horned cattle and 1961 sheep He had twenty-two acres in wheat, eight in maize, four in barley, two in potatoes and two in garden and orchard." Following drought (and the caterpillar plague of 1819) Townson obtained a permit to pasture cattle across the mountains. In May 1821 he sent them south to a run that became Tiranna, Goulburn.

In October 1820 Townson offered property for sale " 405 hectares (1,000 acres) at Bunbury Curran, with a good house and offices and one of the best gardens in the colony. A great part is fenced in and divided into paddocks".

After Macquarie departed the colony, Townson began to take his rightful place in the community. In 1822 he became a foundation vice-president of the Agricultural Society and a member of its Horticultural and Stock Fund Committees. Varroville became a show place for its beauty, abundance and variety in orchard and garden; his vineyard was second only to that of Gregory Blaxland; his fine-wooled sheep and their clip were in great demand; his cattle were numerous and in the opinion of his contemporaries no single man had accomplished more in the rearing of stock'.

==== Timeline ====
- 1823 – 'When the members of the Agricultural Society of New South Wales dined after the general Quarterly Meeting in Nash's Inn, Parramatta, at the beginning of 1823 the dessert was contributed from the gardens of Dr Townson and Captain Piper. "It consisted of no fewer than 18 kinds of fresh fruit, and 4 of dried; among which were the banana, the Orlean plum, the green gage, the real peach, the cat-head apple, and a peculiarly fine sort of musk melon. " 'Next to Gregory Blaxland, Townson was regarded as having 'most successfully and most extensively given his attention to the vine.'
- 1825 – A notice regarding the theft of grain from Townson's farm mentions a granary.
- 1827 – Townson died at Varroville on 27 June 1827 and was buried at St John's Cemetery, Parramatta. A bachelor, he left his fortune to his brother, Captain John Townson of Van Diemen's Land, to two nieces residing in England and to his nephew, Captain John Witts, R.N. A portrait, attributed to Augustus Earle is in the Mitchell Library. By the time of his death, Varro Ville had become a show place for its beauty, abundance and variety in orchard and garden: his vineyard was second only to that of Gregory Blaxland (at Brush Farm, Ryde); his fine-wooled sheep and their clip were in great demand; his cattle were numerous and in the opinion of his contemporaries "no single man had accomplished more in the rearing of stock".
- 1829 – Varroville was acquired by Thomas Spencer Wills (1800–1836), the first Australian born justice of the peace and a founder of the Bank of NSW. One of his sisters married Dr William Redfern (1774–1833) of nearby Campbellfield, a major landowner in the area, while another married Henry Colden Antill (1779–1852) of Jarvisfield, Picton.
- 1832 – The New South Wales Calendar and General Post Office Directory 1832 refers to "the residence of the late Dr Townson, now the property of Thomas Wills, Esq. This place is celebrated for a Garden and Vinery.".
- Early 1837 – Varroville was acquired by explorer, Captain Charles Sturt (1795–1869), who "described himself as "an enthusiastic horticulturalist". Writing to his brother William in Calcutta in 1835 when he was planning the purchase of a property, Sturt begged for fruits, plants, bulbs or seeds, "the rarer the better"." Sturt established dams and modified watercourses, maintained the thriving kitchen garden, orchard and vineyard and took a keen interest in the birdlife at Varroville. He later cited Varroville as a model of water conservation during his term as Assistant Commissioner of Lands in South Australia.
- In 1838 – 'On another occasion, in Sturt's second home in Varroville, the powers of native trackers were again called into play. Here in 1838 he was visited by the bird-artist, John Gould, who greatly admired Sturt's large original collection of Australian Psittacidae [parrots] in water-colour, for which he offered on the spot a large sum. But these paintings had been the delight of Sturt's leisure; he was devoted to ornithology and had collected rare specimens at great trouble and risk, and at no price would he part with his folio. It is supposed that Gould's remarks must have drawn the attention of some dishonest workman to the value of the drawings, for soon afterward the military chest in which they were kept disappeared and was never again seen. Natives put upon the scent found military accoutrements and other articles thrown out of the same chest, so that drawings were clearly the object of the theft'
- Sturt in a speech at a dinner in honour of Governor Gawler, 10 January 1840 urged South Australians to store water. 'On my farm at Varroville, until labour and skill were exerted, one only of many channels held water, and that was brackish. When I passed that farm, every paddock had its proper water-hole. In a severe drought I not only fed 180 head of stock on 405 hectares (1,000 acres) (of which 350 was under cultivation), but I permitted 19 families to supply themselves from my tanks' Turner, male convict servant as cook rescued the elder Sturt son from drowning in a pond or dam.
- 'But no forethought could avert the widespread ruin from such a drought that prevailed between 1836 and 1839. Not even Sturt's waterholes could satisfy all demands or supplement the failing pasture. His hay-crop in 1838 was better than that of his neighbours. But stock were quite at a discount. Nor could wool be sent to Sydney for want of water by the way. The lines of road were unwholesome from the number of cattle and horses that dropped dead upon them. Just when the farmers of New South Wales were reduced to their lowest ebb their hopes were revived by the new settlement in South Australia.'
- In 1839 – Sturt's sale notice for the property appeared in the Australian, "The cottage is convenient and an excellent kitchen and wash house have been added to it. The outhouses consist of stables, coach house, verandah, dairy, store, barn etc. and there is a well-stocked garden and vineyard". 'Sturt apparently sold his uncleared grant 2,023 hectares (5,000 acres) [at Ginningdera, [sic] Canberra] at its auction value with the proceeds bought a small but ready- fenced property at Varroville, which on his sudden departure for South Australia in 1839 [to take up the post of Surveyor-General], he was forced to sell at so great a loss that the final outcome of the grant dwindled to less than £450.'
- November 1839 – Varroville acquired by James Raymond, the first Postmaster General of the Colony of New South Wales. Raymond introduced the world's first pre-paid postage in November 1838, anticipating the British penny postage in 1840. Raymond entertained extensively at Varroville. "He was also a keen follower of horse-racing and owned several horses himself." An oil on canvas horse portrait by Edward Winstanley (1820–1849) "Nazeer Farrib", A High Caste Arab, the property of James Raymond Esq of Varroville is in the State Library of NSW collection (ML282).
- Raymond died at Darlinghurst on 29 May 1851 aged 65 and his daughter Aphra (Aphrasia Kemmis) and her family lived rent-free at Varroville according to the terms of his will. Raymond featured as the fictional postmaster "Raymond Plenty" in architect and writer William Hardy Wilson's romance "The Cowpasture Road", Sydney.
- 1858 – 'In 1858 Raymond's sons sold the property to the late George Taylor Rowe, who mortgaged it to H. H. Browne. Browne defaulted on his mortgage during 1859 and Rowe claimed possession of the house.'
- 27 April 1858 – Architects, Weaver & Kemp of 160 Pitt Street, Sydney advertise for tenders from masons "for laying the Foundations of a House at Varroville, near Campbelltown. Plan and specification, and further particulars may be ascertained on application to the undersigned". William Weaver (1828–) was a former Colonial Architect (1854 – April 1856), formerly Edmund Blacket's clerk of works (while Blacket was Colonial Architect) and had trained under Isambard Kingdom Brunel, the Franco-British civil engineer (1806–1859). Weaver & Kemp also designed Jarvisfield, Picton and Burrundulla, Mudgee. The new house was built on the site of the previous house, retaining an early stone chimneypiece (with evidence of a former kitchen crane) and hearthstone from the previous house. The bread oven chimney has been capped before the shingling of the roof above it.
- c. 1859 – Following Rowe's death Varroville sold to Justice Alfred Cheeke for £4,500. Cheeke (1810–1876) bred and trained race horses at Varroville (including "Clove" which won the first Australian Jockey Club Derby in 1865), established and maintained a private racecourse on the flat below the house. He was elevated to the Supreme Court of New South Wales in 1865. An oval form close to today's F5 freeway has been identified in aerial photographs as possibly Cheeke's racetrack.
- 1876 – Varroville, the estate of the late Justice Cheeke was advertised for sale by Richardson & Wrench and purchased by grazier M. Suttor. 'Varroville House is a commodious family residence, recently erected by the late proprietor. It is built of brick and stone, is nearly surrounded by verandahs and contains the following accommodation:- hall, 8 feet wide: drawing and dining rooms each 20 x 16: 6 bedrooms, two of which are 20 x 16: dressing room with well-arranged superior bath: patent closet: stove, kitchen with oven, servants hall, wine cellar, laundry with copper, larder, pantry, china closet & c. There is an additional residence of six apartments a few yards from the above. Both are surrounded by tastefully laid out gardens and shrubbery, are erected on a beautiful elevation, and approached by a fine carriage drive from the main road.
- An abundant supply of water is obtained from an immense underground reservoir, which receives the roof water. A pump forces the water on to the premises, supplying the bathroom &c.; The outbuildings are very numerous and comprise gardener's house, barn, cow-houses, calf-pens, dairy, piggery with coppers, stock and drafting yards, complete ranges of stabling, including a number of well-finished spacious loose boxes for blood stock.'.
- This house is the third built on the estate.
- 1885 – Suttor sold Varroville to Sydney solicitor, Thomas Salter. Salter leased it to H. Pockley for dairying.
- 1906 – Salter sold Varroville to Reginald Thomas.
- 1912 – Thomas sold Varroville to W. H. Staniforth, dairyman of St Andrews.
- 1923 – Staniforth leased Varroville to Percy, Austin and Arthur Smith (Smith Bros), dairymen of Concord. They operated dairies at Robin Hood Farm (Ingleburn, also NSW State Heritage Register-listed) and Varroville until 1958, running their own dairy herd and purchasing milk from local farmers'.
- 1929 – George Smith purchased Varroville. Varroville was subsequently owned by Robert Stanley Thompson.
- In 1950 – Thompson sold the property to grazier, William Forest Ross who sold it to former engineer and owner of Gatwick Airport in England, and former RAF 601 Squadron (Auxiliary) member, Alfred L M (Morris) and wife Cherry Jackaman (1911–2011). Changes made by the Jackamans include enlarging the drawing room (to the former footprint of the northern veranda and extending the terrace on this side), relocating the access to the cellar, building the colonnade at the western end of the courtyard (on the site of a picket fence), installing the fountain against the northern range wall, building the swimming pool, change rooms, gazebo and "crazy paving" the surrounds of these. The old back drive from St Andrew's Road became the principal entry.
- In 1960 – Cherry Jackaman joined Dame Helen Blaxland on the Women's Committee of the National Trust (NSW). Jackaman chaired this committee from 1964–67 and by 1968 had raised more than $100,000, which was directed to Experiment Farm Cottage, Lindesay and the St. Matthews Anglican Church at Windsor Appeal. She also presided over the initiation of house inspections designed to recognise important heritage properties within NSW and pioneered discounting of building supplies for restoring listed properties.
- 1964 – the Jackamans opened Varroville as part of house inspections by the National Trust of Australia (NSW) Women's Committee (another opening was held in 1968). The tour brochures indicated the Jackamans considered the house to predate the 1850s, with the verandas and marble chimneypieces described as later additions. Mrs Jackaman's guests included her friend, the British actress Vivienne Leigh, Sir Laurence Olivier and Princess Michael of Kent.
- Cherry Jackaman resumed the chair of the Women's Committee of the National Trust (NSW) in 1970 for three years and was elected unopposed as the first female president of the National Trust of Australia (NSW) in 1977, a position she held until 1981. In the early 1970s the house lot was subdivided from its context onto 3.1 hectares (7.7 acres). The date of subdivision of the land occupied by Sweeney's Riding Ranch from land owned by the Jackaman family is unknown.
- In 1973 – the Campbelltown Local Environmental Plan's zoning of this section (Central Hills) of what has become known as its "Scenic Hills" was zoned, predominantly in the case of Varroville's setting, 7d1 – Environment Protection – Scenic, some zoned 6c – Open Space (Regional).
- In the 1980s – land was resumed from the estate for the M5 Motorway.
- In 1990 – Mrs Jackaman presented Varroville homestead and 3.1 hectares (7.7 acres) (i.e. without its outbuildings) to the National Trust of Australia (NSW).
- In 1991 – the property was sold to fund National Trust of Australia (NSW) debt.
- In 1992 – The National Trust (NSW) commissioned a conservation plan for Varroville from architects, Orwell and Peter Phillips and sold Varroville to architects, Keith and Virginia Pearson-Smith.
- 2002 – Varroville was acquired by John Moutsopoulos and Vanessa Seary.
- 2006 – Varroville was acquired by Peter Gibbs and Jacqui Kirkby.
- May 2007 – The Cornish Group acquired approximately 113 hectares (280 acres) adjoining and surrounding Varroville from Mrs Jackaman's daughters. Prior to this the Cornish Group were reported to have taken out an option to buy the adjoining Sweeney's Scenic Riding Ranch (not owned by the Jackaman family), giving them approximately 320 hectares (800 acres) of the original 400 hectares (1,000 acres) of Robert Townson's 1810 estate.
- In 2009 – Cherry Jackaman was awarded the OAM. Morris died in 1980, Cherry moving to Double Bay.

== Description ==
=== Estate and setting ===
The approach to the siting of Varroville which avoided the house being silhouetted against the sky was endorsed by the horticulturalist and landscape designer, Thomas Shepherd (1776-1836, probably citing the British landscape architect Humphry Repton) when describing the siting of Elizabeth Bay House, Sydney, and later discussed by British writer on estate planning, John Claudius Loudon (1773-1843) whose writings were influential in colonial New South Wales. Varroville is oriented east-west, taking advantage of vistas to other Cumberland Plain homesteads, Denham Court and Macquarie Field House. The locally named Scenic Hills describe the picturesque rolling country selected as the location of the Varroville grant.

=== Garden ===
In the immediate surrounds of the house, the gravelled carriage drive, lawn tennis court site, remains of a glasshouse and plantings are elements of a substantially intact mid-19th century garden plan. The carriage loop (with concrete edgings remaining from the Jackaman period: (1950–1990)) appears to relate to the 1858 house. It does not connect with the drive that passes in front of it to the east, but this "disconnection" may relate to Jackaman period changes. Perimeter fence lines and gates have been relocated during the Jackaman period.

Hardy Wilson described "Varraville" [sic] as "an Early-Victorian homestead encompassed by many oleanders". The garden contains staples of Cumberland Plain gardening – Moreton Bay figs (Ficus macrophylla), hoop pines (Araucaria cunninghamii) funeral cypresses (Chamaecyparis funebris) (particularly along the back drive), white cedars (Melia azederach var. australasica), pepper trees (Schinus molle var. areira), coral trees (Erythrina sp., probably E.indica or E.x sykesii), a Norfolk Island hibiscus /white oak (Lagunaria patersonia), orchid tree (Bauhinia variegata), century plants/agaves (A.americana) (the stretch of original drive in front of the house is a forest of these), Spanish bayonets/Adam's needles (Yucca sp.), aloes (A.sp.) and hedges of Cape honeysuckle/tecoma (Tecomaria capensis) and common African olive (Olea europaea var. africana).

The kitchen garden laid out in 1809 and described in Sturt's 1839 sale advertisement may have occupied sloping ground to the north – west of the house.

The oldest colonial plantings appear to be located in the tennis court area east of the house, which is supports the current owners' view that this is the most likely site of the second house on the property (built by Townson and lived in by Sturt and Raymond). Landscape architect Geoffrey Britton advises that Varroville's Indian shot/ Canna lily is the species plant (C.indica) and that was located en masse on the far slope of what is now a herbaceous border on the southern bank above the tennis court. Geoffrey also considers that the Cypress located on the entrance there is very old. Aside from the figs and hoop pines and re-seeded white cedars, the rest of the garden is largely of the Jackaman era planted out in the 1950s and early 1960s. C.japonica on site is likely also to be remnant progeny of an early colonial planting as there are many in the tennis court area, along with cotoneasters. Cotoneasters could have been put there by the Jackamans, as Cherry Jackaman apparently had cotoneasters espaliered down the northern side of the house (removed by later owners).

There are two arbors in the garden - an old arbour with an enormous Banksia rose (Rosa banksia 'Lutea') which was replaced by the previous owners and a second arbour (with an old jasmine (Jasminium sp.) and wisteria (W.sinensis) is now propped up with iron bars.

=== Outbuildings ===
The outbuildings may date from c. 1810 (Macquarie's visit); 1813 (Townson's move to the property); or later. These include a coach house. The buildings may lie outside SHR boundary to the east.

=== House ===
Varroville, occupying the site of a previous c. 1810s house has important relationships with features associated with the Townson, Wills and Sturt periods of ownership and occupancy of the estate (1810–1839) – the original driveway from Campbelltown Road, outbuildings grouped in relation to the entrance drive on the ridge to the southern side of the house, the remnant vineyard terracing that wraps around the hillside in view of the house, a track to Bunbury Curran Hill, post and rail fences and dams and modified watercourses believed to have been made by the explorer, Charles Sturt.

The house occupies a narrow ridge (or saddle) on the south side of Bunbury Curran Hill, a landmark that led Townson to refer to Varroville as his property at "Bunbury Curran". Bunbury Curran Hill was climbed by Governor and Mrs Macquarie in November 1810 to take advantage of views across the Cumberland Plain to Sydney. The hill, clad in bush, has evidently played a significant role in the landscape design of Varroville, providing a dramatic backdrop to the house when approached from the south. The landscape design of Varroville was discussed between Townson and the Macquaries in 1810.

Varroville House is a substantial single-storey symmetrical rendered brick house in a "U" shape with two rear wings on a stone foundation by the architects, Weaver and Kemp and dating from 1858-9. Its room uses are known from an 1876 sale advertisement. The fabric of the house is intact with surviving blackbutt floors, cedar joinery, plaster ceiling roses and imported marble chimneypieces. The roof, originally shingled, is now covered with corrugated iron. The house appears to occupy the site of a previous (1810s) house and the kitchen of the northern wing incorporates the sandstone chimneypiece of a previous service wing (one of the uprights of the chimneypiece has a void for the hinging of an iron kitchen crane). A large underground water tank extends westwards from the ends of the wings of the house.

=== Condition ===
As at 8 August 2007, the fabric of the house is intact with surviving blackbutt floors, cedar joinery, plaster ceiling roses and imported marble chimneypieces. The roof, originally shingled, is now covered with corrugated iron.

=== Modifications and dates ===
The house appears to occupy the site of a previous (1810s) house and the kitchen of the northern wing incorporates the sandstone chimneypiece of a previous service wing (one of the uprights of the chimneypiece has a void for the hinging of an iron kitchen crane).

The oldest colonial plantings appear to be located in the tennis court area east of the house, which is supports the current owners' view that this is the most likely site of the second house on the property (built by Townson and lived in by Sturt and Raymond).

Aside from the figs and hoop pines and re-seeded white cedars, the rest of the garden is largely of the Jackaman era planted out in the 1950s and early 1960s. C.japonica on site is likely also to be remnant progeny of an early colonial planting as there are many in the tennis court area.

- 1950–90 – The Jackamans made many changes, including enlarging the drawing room (to the former footprint of the northern veranda and extending the terrace on this side), relocating the access to the cellar, building the colonnade at the western end of the courtyard (on the site of a picket fence), installing the fountain against the northern range wall, building the swimming pool, change rooms, gazebo and "crazy paving" the surrounds of these. The old back drive from St Andrew's Road became the principal entry. The verandah surface was paved in concrete. Perimeter fence lines and gates were relocated. The carriage loop (with concrete edgings remaining from the Jackaman period (1950-1990)) appears to relate to the 1858 house. It does not connect with the drive that passes in front of it to the east, but this "disconnection" may relate to Jackaman period changes. Perimeter fence lines and gates were relocated. The majority of the garden is largely of this era, planted out in the 1950s and early 1960s. In the tennis court area are many cotoneasters - which could have been planted by the Jackamans, as Cherry Jackaman had cotoneasters espaliered down the northern side of the house (removed by later owners).
- Date unknown: roof, originally shingled, is now covered with corrugated iron
- c. 1990–c. 2000 – Pearson-Smith ownership period. Various conservation, reinstatement/repair works done.
- c. 2000 – The older of the two arbors in the garden was replaced by the then owners, the Pearson-Smiths. It has an enormous Banksia rose (Rosa banksiae 'Lutea') and in late 2008 fell down under the weight of the bush.
- 2002–05 – SHR-listed land was fenced off from the surrounding land (rural fencing); security system installed and new brass locks to windows and doors; floors of main rooms sanded and polished; wall-to-wall carpets removed from all bedrooms revealing poor state of floors in wings; sandstone removed from Jackaman era walled garden - possibly used in new sandstone steps along rear of courtyard; front verandah re-laid (not in original form); new modern sandstone verandah installed on north-western side of house outside drawing room extension; extensive removal of overgrowth in garden; removal of old garden plantings adjacent to house and pool - possibly to allow cleaning and relaying of stonework and pool works; Jackaman era pond to front of house and the courtyard's "crazy paving" partially removed (incomplete resolution).
- 2006–07 – Minor garden changes, removing a lot of overgrown lantana (L.camara) to reveal former layout and form. New perennial and shrub plantings around house, former tennis court and western garden. Removal of Jackaman-era trees against house that were dying, including large Chinese elm from courtyard, the roots of which had penetrated the cellar. Old Morton Bay Fig at rear of house is in process of falling down after lightning strike. Numerous new plantings of araucarias (bidwillii, araucana, columnaris), English elms and other deciduous trees. Remains of Jackaman era pond works to front of house removed to resolve half-way status.
- c. 2007–12 – Range of works done: stripping all drawing room joinery back to (and re-treating) original cedar (was painted, likely c. 1900, rather than Jackaman era); found and re-erected old house window shutters, now need painting; replaced 1950's asbestos shed with work shed and garage in corrugated Colourbond; corrugated iron roof repainted in dark grey; joinery conservation; all doors re-hung (replaced worn brass hinges); removal of obtrusive material from main fire places – including bricks from Jackaman era, wood surrounds from Pearson Smith era (revealed no frame around hearthstone in replacement floor in bedroom – not yet corrected); hearthstones and floors jacked back into place: new hearthstone for drawing room (original was missing and had been previously replaced by obtrusive modern marble tiles); column screen inserted along original external wall of drawing room to define Jackaman era extension over verandah; extension's cornice replaced; internal cedar shutters added to windows either side of front door and half shutters to north facing library to increase security/reduce sun damage; repainting of main rooms; hall painted to imitate marble as tribute to Robert Campion, 19th century Campbelltown painter & decorator who similarly painted the halls of nearby Glenlee, Glenalvon and Denham Court in the 1870s–1880s. All internal house works carried out by Peter Gibbs, owner and bespoke (colonial) cedar furniture maker. The couourtyard has yet to be restored.

=== Further information ===
The land falls under Campbelltown Local Environmental Plan (LEP) District 8 – (Central Hills Lands) – the majority is zoned 7(d1) (Environmental Protection – Scenic); the remainder zoned 6c (Open Space – Regional).

== Heritage listing ==
As at 21 May 2007, 'Varroville is a 'celebrated early farm estate dating from 1810 with early structures, the 1850s homestead, layout, agricultural (vineyard) terracing and evidence of early access road.'

'Varroville is rare as one of the few larger estate landscapes remaining in the Campbelltown area where the form of the original grant and the former agricultural use of the estate and its rural landscape character may be appreciated.'

Varroville was a significant to the horticultural development of New South Wales through the laying out of a productive kitchen garden in 1809 noted for its extensive fruit varieties by the early 1820s and the establishment of a vineyard, said to be second only to that of Gregory Blaxland of Brush Farm, Eastwood. The vineyard terraces are extant and together with the early drive suggest that the present 1858 house occupies the site of the earlier 1810s house. Accounts relating to Charles Sturt's ownership (1837–39) indicate the property's continued role in the acclimatisation of plants sourced from as far afield as Calcutta.

Varroville was significant to agriculture and food production in early New South Wales. The grants of land at Minto were made by Colonel Paterson in response to the Hawkesbury floods of 1806 and later, aiming to safeguard the colony's food supplies. A significant portion of Varroville was used for growing crops in the c.1810s–1830s period. Townson supplied meat to the Sydney, Liverpool and Parramatta commissariat stores.

Macquarie commented that the farms of Townson and Andrew Thompson (St. Andrews, opposite Varroville) were "by far the best pasturage I have yet seen in the colony". The gently rolling hills of the two properties appealed to English Picturesque sensibilities and today is reflected in the locality name, Scenic Hills, defined under the Campbelltown Local Environment Plan – District 8 (Central Hills Lands). This plan aims 'to ensure that the Central Hills Lands District of the City of Campbelltown retains the rural character that was envisaged for it during the planning that preceded the urbanisation of that City.' 'The still appreciable direct viewline from the 1850s Varroville homestead to the landmark Araucarias of both nearby Denham Court and Macquarie Fields House appears to be a deliberate siting intention.'.

Varroville house is sited as "a house in landscape" according to estate planning principles put forward by British landscape designers Humphrey Repton in the 1790s–1810s (echoed by the Sydney-based horticulturalist and landscape designer, Thomas Shepherd in the 1830s) and John Claudius Loudon in the 1820s–40s. The house is sited to take advantage of sweeping, wrap-around views of the scenic hills from Raby Road in the west to Bunbury Curran Hill in the north and to an extending ridgeline of the range to the east. The important western view dominates the entry through the front door and across the rear courtyard. Varroville, through the Sturt dams and modified watercourses, accounts from the Sturt period and the large underground water tank c. 1858 that extends westwards from the ends of the wings of the house illustrates early recognition of the importance of water conservation to colonists in New South Wales and South Australia. Sturt's accounts relate to the great drought of the 1830s that led to the depression of the early 1840s that was devastating to early NSW society.

Varroville is significant for the relationship between the house and its group of farm buildings, sited in relation to each other on the ridge. The location of the outbuildings along the entrance drive reflect Augustus Earle's c. 1829 watercolour view of Lieut William Lawson's Veteran Hall, Prospect (National Library of Australia) and Mrs Charles Meredith's description of Homebush in the 1840s with barns, stables and estate worker's cottages and other "ornamental edifices" being visible en route to the house (although not through the front door as Mrs Meredith complained of Homebush). Both Veteran Hall and Homebush have since been demolished.

The house dating from 1858–59 is a significant example of the work of William Weaver, former Government Architect 1854–56. The firm, Weaver and Kemp, also designed Jarvisfield, Picton and Burundulla, Mudgee. The fabric of the house is intact with surviving blackbutt floors, cedar joinery, plaster ceiling roses and imported marble chimneypieces. The roof, originally shingled, is now covered with corrugated iron. The house appears to occupy the site of a previous (1810s) house and the kitchen of the northern wing incorporates the sandstone chimneypiece of a previous service wing. With the exception of generously scaled rooms and plate glass windows (allowing maximum light and taking in of the views), the symmetrical Italianate villa is architecturally conservative (and comparable with houses such as Yasmar, Haberfield, designed by John Bibb in c.1852). This, and the large underground watertank at the end of the wings may reflect Weaver's engineering (rather than architectural) training.

The garden immediately surrounding the house is a substantially intact mid-19th century plan with a gravelled carriage drive (with post-1950 concrete edgings), lawn tennis court site c. 1870?, remains of a glasshouse and a trellis. Perimeter fence lines and gates have been relocated post 1950 but the original locations are well documented in photographs of c.1935. Hardy Wilson described "Varraville" [sic] as "an Early-Victorian homestead encompassed by many oleanders". The pink oleander at the north-east corner of the house was extant in 1950 (information from Mrs Jackaman) and may have been one of the oleanders described by Hardy Wilson. The garden contains staples of Cumberland Plain gardening: Moreton Bay figs, hoop pines, funeral cypresses, white cedars, pepper trees, a Norfolk Island hibiscus, Bauhinia, agaves (bordering the original drive), yuccas, aloes and hedges of cape honeysuckle (Tecomaria capensis) and common olive. The Queensland rain forest tree, Barclaya syringifolia, may survive from the c.1890s–1910 period.

Varroville received important early 20th century literary and artistic recognition as a major homestead of the Cumberland Plain through its inclusion on the parchment map that provides the key to W. Hardy Wilson's romance, "The Cowpasture Road" (1920). The fictional postmaster, Raymond Plenty in The Cowpasture Road (pp 38–40) is no doubt inspired by James Raymond, owner of Varroville 1839–1851, and the reference to the squires having chased Governor Bligh under his bed (p. 8) may be a reference to Townson.

Varroville is 'historically important for its association with prominent owners Dr Robert Townson, Charles Sturt, James Raymond and Alfred Cheeke and for its relationship with Bunbury Curran Hill - a viewing point used by both Governor and Mrs Macquarie.' Varroville during the Raymond, Cheeke and Jackaman periods was a prestigious country estate for owners whose wealth came from other sources. Between c. 1876 and 1950 the property was operated as a dairy, and was representative of rural industry in the Campbelltown area. The property presently retains its rural character.

Varroville was listed on the New South Wales State Heritage Register on 2 April 1999 having satisfied the following criteria.

The place is important in demonstrating the course, or pattern, of cultural or natural history in New South Wales.

Varroville has historic significance for its association with Robert Townson, the colony's most highly regarded academic when he arrived as a settler intending to establish himself as a pastoralist and trader in 1807, and with the development of the Australian wine industry, having been once known as 'the finest orchard in the Colony and a vineyard second only to Gregory Blaxland's' (at Brush Farm, Ryde). Townson was granted 1000 acres at Minto and made very good use of it. Governor Macquarie was very impressed when he visited Varroville on his first inspection of the interior in 1810.
