= Blair Athol, New South Wales =

Blair Athol
- Suburb
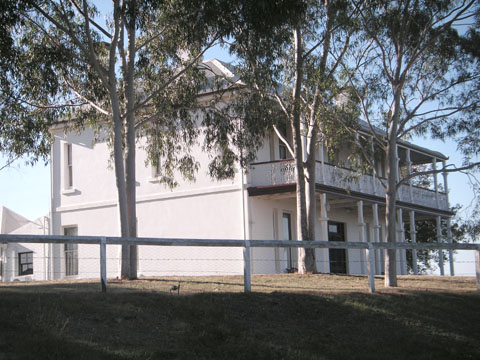
- Blair Athol House

- Interactive map of Blair Athol
- Coordinates: 34°3′47″S 150°48′0″E
- Country: Australia
- State: New South Wales
- City: Sydney
- LGA: City of Campbelltown
- Location: 57 km (35 mi) SW of Sydney
- Established: 1992

Government
  - State electorate: Campbelltown
  - Federal division: Macarthur
- Elevation: 92 m (302 ft)

Population
  - Total: 2,725 (2021 census)
- Postcode: 2560
Suburbs around Blair Athol
Blairmount	Claymore	Woodbine
Blairmount	Blair Athol	Campbelltown
Mount Annan	Englorie Park	Campbelltown

Blair Athol is a suburb of Sydney, in the state of New South Wales, Australia. Blair Athol is located 57 kilometres south-west of the Sydney central business district, in the local government area of the City of Campbelltown and is part of the Macarthur region.

== History ==
British settlers began moving into the area in the early 19th century, establishing farms and orchards in the fertile soil. John Kidd, a Scotsman, built the original Blair Athol homestead in 1879. He named it after the village of Blair Atholl in Scotland. The following year he became the area's member of parliament, a position he held until 1904. In 1945, the land was sold to an engineering company who planned to build a factory in the area. Campbelltown Council rezoned the entire area as industrial in the hope that other industries would also move into the area but for the most part the land remained vacant. In 1992, the Council rezoned the land back to residential and the current suburb was born.

== Demographics ==
According to the 2021 census of Population, there were 2,725 residents in Blair Athol. In Blair Athol, 50.3% of people were born in Australia. The most common other countries of birth were Philippines 9.1%, India 5.7%, Fiji 3.2%, Laos 2.9% and New Zealand 2.2%. 46.7% of residents only spoke English at home. Other languages spoken at home included Arabic 6.3%, Tagalog 5.9%, Hindi 4.8%, Lao 3.3% and Malayalam 3.0%. The most common responses for religion in Blair Athol were Catholic 30.9%, No Religion 15.3%, Islam 12.2%, Buddhism 7.2% and Anglican 6.8%.
