= Varroville, New South Wales =

Varroville
- Suburb
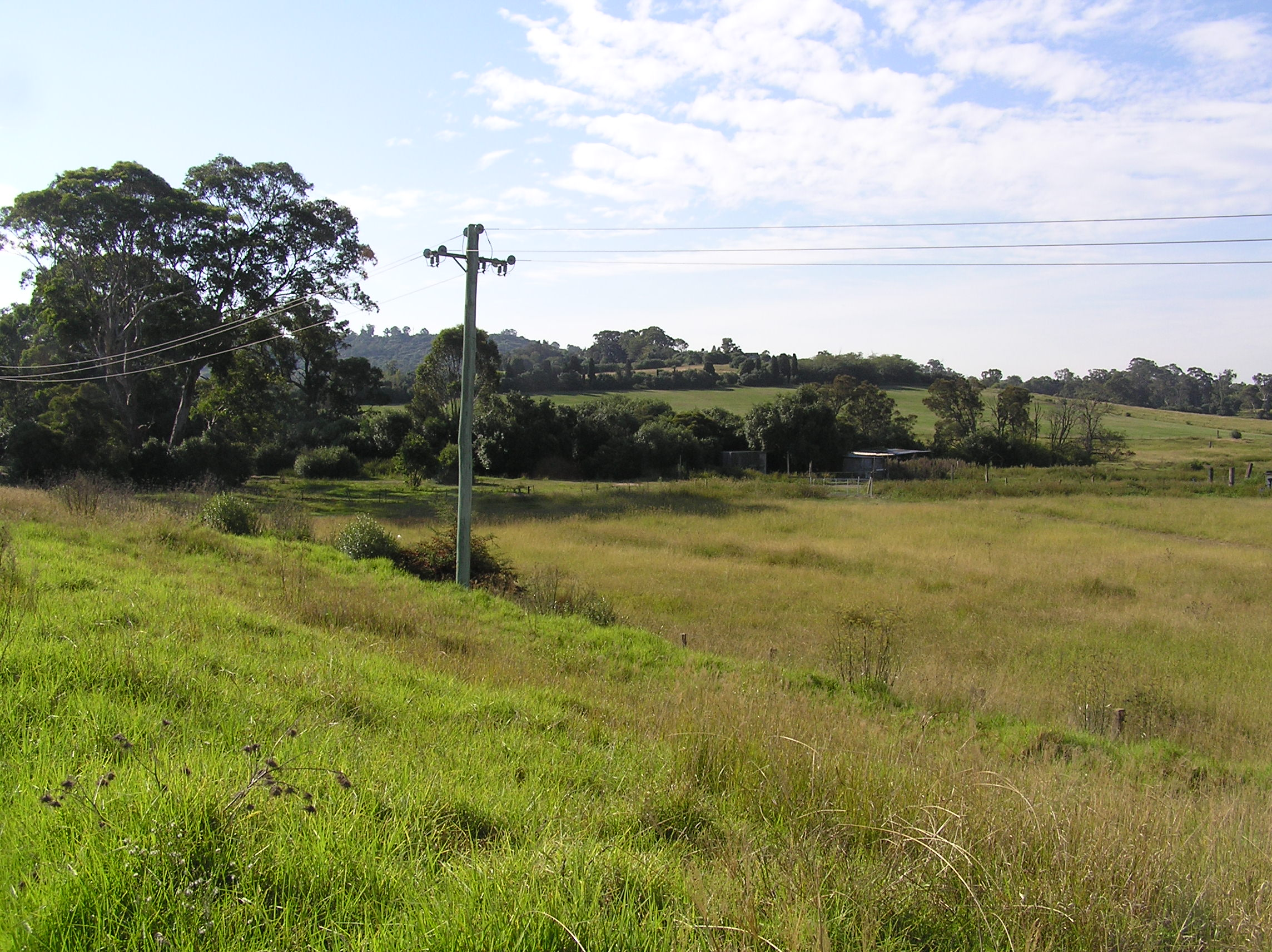
- Rural area in Varroville

- Interactive map of Varroville
- Country: Australia
- State: New South Wales
- City: Sydney
- LGA: City of Campbelltown
- Location: 46 km (29 mi) south-west of Sydney CBD

Government
  - State electorate: Leppington
  - Federal division: Macarthur
- Elevation: 70 m (230 ft)

Population
  - Total: 134 (2021 census)
- Postcode: 2566
Suburbs around Varroville
Leppington	Denham Court	Denham Court
Catherine Field	Varroville	Ingleburn
Kearns	Raby	St Andrews

Varroville is a suburb of Sydney, in the state of New South Wales, Australia. Varroville is located 46 kilometres south-west of the Sydney central business district, in the local government area of the City of Campbelltown and is part of the Macarthur region. Varroville forms part of the scenic hills on the north-west side of the M5 South Western Motorway between Campbelltown and the Camden Valley Way. Of all Sydney suburbs, Varroville has the highest proportion of residents with PhDs.

Sydney's newest General Cemetery, the first in over 50 years, was opened on 7 April 2025, at Macarthur Memorial Park, Varroville.

== History ==
Varroville was originally a farm called Varro Ville. An area of 1,000 acres (4 km^{2}) of land was granted by Governor Lachlan Macquarie to Robert Townson, a scientist and scholar, in 1809. Townson developed the farm and grew a vineyard and raised cattle. Townson died in 1827 and ownership passed onto his brother, Captain John Townson of Van Diemen's Land, to two nieces residing in England and to his nephew, Captain John Witts, R.M. In 1837 the farm was sold to Charles Sturt a famous explorer who moved in from Mittagong. James Raymond took over in 1839. Alfred Cheeke, a supreme court judge was a later owner. By 1900 Varro Ville was a leading dairy farm in the Campbelltown area. The farmhouse fell into disrepair, but has been restored by the new owners and the National Trust. The name Varroville was officially adopted in 1972 for the area between Raby and Denham Court. The area was previously part of Minto.

== Heritage listings ==
Varroville has a number of heritage-listed sites, including:

- 196 St Andrews Road: Varroville (homestead)

== Landmarks ==
The Mount Carmel Novitiate was built in 1966, while Mount Carmel High School opened in 1986.

== Sport ==
Kooringa Reserve is located directly across the road from Mount Carmel High School. This is the home ground to the St Mary's Eagle Vale Soccer Club the largest soccer club in the Macarthur District.

== Transport ==
The main road in Varroville is St Andrews Road. This was originally a dirt track, skirting St Andrews farm, owned by Andrew Thompson. Other roads named after saints are St James and St David.
