= Raby, Catherine Field =

Raby
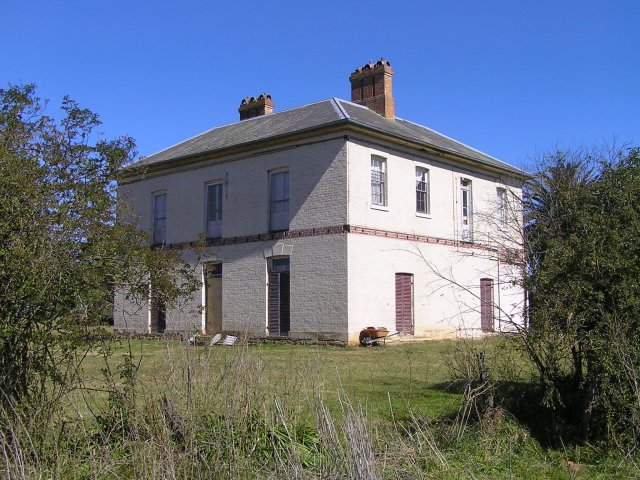

- Location within Sydney Location within Australia
- 33°59′39″S 150°47′01″E
- Location: 1025 Camden Valley Way, Catherine Field, Camden Council, New South Wales, Australia

History
- Built: 1820–1834

New South Wales Heritage Register
- Official name: Raby
- Type: State heritage (landscape)
- Designated: 1 March 2010
- Reference no.: 1694
- Type: Historic Landscape
- Category: Landscape – Cultural

Raby is a heritage-listed former sheep farm and cattle farm and now private residence located at 1025 Camden Valley Way in the south-western Sydney suburb of Catherine Field in the Camden Council local government area of New South Wales, Australia. It was designed and built from 1820 to 1834; and was added to the New South Wales State Heritage Register on 1 March 2010.

== History ==
=== The Cowpastures ===
When the first fleet arrived in Sydney Cove in 1788 they found the soil unsuitable for farming and soon looked towards the heavy clay and loam soils of the Cumberland Plain (to the west) to sustain the colony. Early agricultural settlements were located on the rich alluvial soils of the Nepean, Hawkesbury and Georges River areas, as well as South Creek near St Marys and at the head of the Parramatta River where the settlement of Rose Hill (later Parramatta) was established about six months after the fleet landed. A settlement at the Hawkesbury was established in 1794.

By 1804 much of the Cumberland Plain had been settled and Governor King began to look for other regions in the colony for favourable arable land. The only suitable land within the Cumberland Plain was the area known as the Cowpastures, located in the southwestern corner. This area was named after the discovery in 1795 of cows from the first fleet which had wandered off into the bush. The Cowpastures had remained unoccupied due to the official decree that reserved the land for the wild cattle (to encourage their increase).

In December 1803 Governor King and Mrs King visited the Cowpastures for themselves and the Sydney Gazette reported that Mrs King was the first "white lady" to have crossed the Nepean River. The track to the Cowpastures led from Prospect and on 17 September 1805 James Meehan, under instructions from Governor King, commenced a survey of the track from Prospect to the Nepean Crossing and a rough road followed the marked line. This became known as Cowpasture Road, later the Hume Highway, most of which is today part of the Camden Valley Way.

Several visits to the area by the colonial gentry took place at this time, which resulted in their desire to acquire some of this rich land for themselves. They saw the area as containing very good grazing land. Captain Henry Waterhouse described the area in a letter to John Macarthur in 1804 as follows: " I am at a loss to describe the face of the country other than as a beautiful park, totally divested of underwood, interspersed with plains, with rich luxuriant grass".

Earlier Europeans had described "large ponds covered with ducks and the black swan, the margins of which were fringed with shrubs of the most delightful tints". The Europeans thought the flats were perfect for cattle and the hills would carry sheep. They admired the absence of underbush - probably achieved through Aboriginal burning off - and felt comfortable with a landscape that reminded them of an English gentleman's park.

John Macarthur received the first land grant in the Cowpastures region in 1805 for his role in the early wool industry in the colony. Lord Camden rewarded him with 4,047 hectares (10,000 acres) and Macarthur chose the highly coveted Cowpastures for his grant, though Governor King tried to prevent him from taking it. Macarthur also organised an 809-hectare (2,000-acre) grant for his friend Walter Davidson, who allowed Macarthur to use his land freely after Davidson returned to England. In this manner, Macarthur controlled 19 kilometres (12 mi) of riverbank on the site where the wild cattle had first discovered the best pasture near Sydney. Later purchases and exchanges increased the Macarthur land there to over 10,927 hectares (27,000 acres), an endowment that Governor Macquarie greatly resented.

Other early grants were in the Parishes of Minto and in adjoining Evan, Bringelly, Narellan and Cook. These all lay west of Parramatta.

Governor Macquarie drew up plans in 1820 for the establishment of a town in the area, to be named Campbelltown after his wife Elizabeth's maiden name. With their forced return to England in 1822 these plans never came to fruition and it was not until the arrival of Governor Darling in 1827 that plans were again reinstated and the first settlers were allowed to take possession of their townland in 1831. In the early 1850s the railway line from Sydney to Goulburn was completed, with a station opening at Campbelltown in 1858. When Leppington House was offered for lease in 1865, one of its selling points was that it was near a railway. Campbelltown now provided easy access to Sydney and its markets and grew as the centre of the district. Although Camden was established in 1836, with no railway line it remained a small town.

The large estates that flanked Cowpasture Road (later Camden Valley Way) and the Northern Road were run largely as sheep and cattle farms, with wheat and other grain crops being grown as well until the 1850s. The houses were often built on surrounding ridges or hills, providing sweeping views of the countryside and ensuring that any passing traveller could appreciate the owner's status by viewing their impressive country mansions from the road. This land use pattern of large farm estates and small towns, established in the nineteenth century, remained largely the pattern of development of the area up until the late 1990s. Aerial photographs of the area in 1947 show a rural landscape with some limited urban development on either side of (then) Camden Valley Way.

=== Raby ===
Raby, consisting of 1,214 hectares (3,000 acres) of land, was granted to Alexander Riley in 1816, whose principal place of residence was at Burwood. Riley came to NSW in 1804 and, after serving as storekeeper and magistrate in Tasmania and Secretary to the colony in Sydney, he resigned. In addition to farming (particularly sheep farming), he became a prosperous trader, his Sydney partnership with Richard Jones aided by links with Alexander's brother Edward Riley in Calcutta and W. S. Davidson in Canton.

In 1816 Edward Riley joined Alexander in NSW and the following year Alexander returned to England, where he became an agent for colonial trade. Through his knowledge as a British agent for the colonial wool trade, Riley recognised the importance of the quality of wool and decided to invest in 200 Saxon merinos. His nephew, also named Edward, helped select the stock in Germany and accompanied them to the Colony in the George Osborne in 1825. Although the farm buildings at Raby had been neglected by his brother during the intervening period and there was a period of severe drought, Edward Riley jnr was able to foster the herd. In 1827 and for the following three years Raby's Saxons eclipsed all others at the Australian Agricultural Society's Annual Shows.

In December 1817 Raby was leased to George Cribb of Sydney, butcher. There are two renditions of Raby from the 1820s – Joseph Lycett produced an idealised view of Raby for his "Views in Australia" (1824) and a pencil drawing by W. Mason. Both views show a house on the property - a single storey farmhouse set in a cleared paddock surrounded by eucalypt forest. It is thought that this was built in c. 1820. Lycett's romanticised view of Raby mentions the farm upon the Cowpasture Road leading to the Nepean, at the distance of 51 kilometres (32 mi) from Sydney. Helen Proudfoot quotes the following description:

"The three thousand acre property forms a striking contrast between forests and the vast openings of land which have been cleared to accommodate livestock. The Estate on its southern boundary is dominated by a piece of water that, in a connecting chain of small ponds, forms the head of the South Creek, one of the principal and most important branches of the Hawkesbury River. The Pasture at Raby is most fertile and principally devoted to the grazing of fine-woolled sheep: from fifteen hundred to two thousand of which are herded every night on a fresh site. On a hill where the Superintendent's House is seen, flocks containing about 350 sheep each, formed around the bark-hut and fire of a Watchman, who protects livestock from native dogs".

— Helen Proudfoot

According to Murphy the house was one of the best and most substantial of the early houses in the district. It is thought to have been located in approximately the same position as the present house.

One hundred sheep were brought out from Germany by Alexander's son William Riley and by 1830 the family venture had proved successful. A further 4000 hectares was granted to them by the Colonial Secretary and they applied for land near Yass, naming the property Cavan. William Riley was an astute stud breeder and wrote a paper with W. H. Dutton. In 1834 Baron Von Hugel, while overlooking the success of the sheep-farming, referred to Raby in his New Holland Journal as "The large property of a young man named W. E. Riley Esq., whose father introduced Tibetan goats here which, as I hear, thrive well but have not been profitable That same year, Dr Lhotsky referred to Raby as one of the most famous farms in the colony.

By 1830, William Edward Riley, Alexander Riley's son, had taken over the management of the property. In 1833 Alexander Riley died, leaving his property to his son. W. E. Riley married Honoria Rose Brooks, a daughter of Richard Brooks of Denham Court. The couple had two children. The family lived principally at Raby, but was also at times based at Cavan, the Riley property at Yass. Notes in the Riley papers refer to the painting of a paling entrance at the White gate, and to spikes for the bridge rails at the white gate. The location of the gate and the bridge is not specified.

In 1836 William Riley was killed in a riding accident and it appears that his father Alexander Riley largely withdrew from his Australian interests, as indicated by the selling his sheep. However, the Riley family retained ownership of Raby until 1866. The farm was leased to a number of people over this time. Edward Moore and his descendants were the next owners of Raby. A. R. Riley had mortgaged the property, and in 1866 it was sold on behalf of the mortgagors. It was bought by William Moore, grazier, of Booligal on the Lachlan River. It is possible that the Moore family was in occupation of the property before the purchase. Edward Moore was a weaver from Manchester, indicted as a convict for possessing one forged bank note. His wife Elizabeth (who he had married at St. George's church, Southwark, London, in 1814) was convicted at the Lancaster Assizes of possessing three forged bank notes. On 21 March 1818, she and husband were sentenced "to be transported to some parts beyond the seas for the term of 14 years". Moore arrived in NSW in 1818, leaving behind his wife and their two children. Elizabeth arrived as a convict on the Lord Wellington in January 1820, with the children. She was listed as a cook, aged 31, though she was really 37. She and 5 year old Joseph and Ellen, nearly 3 were in rude good health.

In March 1820 Moore petitioned Governor Macquarie for a ticket-of-leave, given for good behaviour and to encourage convicts to earn their own living by working for an employer. His employer, Robert Lowe, said he worked soberly, honestly and diligently. By the 1828 census, he had added Robert, Edward Lomas, James and William to the family. He also cleared 8 hectares (20 acres) of land at Macquarie Fields, 6 hectares (14 acres) of them under crop. In 1830 a second daughter, Elizabeth was born and Edward bought a farm, Drummondville, about 11 kilometres (7 mi) out of Liverpool, growing hay for the teamsters coming to and from Sydney. By about 1835, when he leased Raby from the Riley estate near Campbelltown (now Catherine Fields), Moore was doing very well. The Moore family entertained Governor FitzRoy on his hunting expeditions at Raby. The FitzRoys gave the Moore family a French ormolu mantle clock in the shape of a lyre, in black and gold. It is today at Ellensville, Mount Hunter.

Margaret Browne (née Riley) grew up at Denham Court, Ingleburn, which had a prominent colonial garden. Browne was the first woman to write a book on gardening in Australia, under the name Mrs Rolf Boldrewood. She wrote letters to the much older Ellen Foreman (née Moore), who lived with her parents at Raby, Catherine Field and later established Ellensville, Mount Hunter. These letters survive and have been published as a book by Pacita Alexander, showing the ties between the colonial properties of the Cumberland Plain and hints of the influence of those places on the shared joys of gardening.

A plan of Raby drawn up in 1866 shows that the property consisted of 1,331 hectares (3,289 acres). A note on the plan mentions that "The fences on this property are evidently very old indeed some portions especially on the north-western boundary have been renewed but the stumps of the old posts are visible". A structure may be shown in the location of the house. A gate is indicated in roughly the same location as the present entrance. William Moore carried out improvements on the property, including clearing and fencing. It seems that he managed Raby as a mixed farm.

The present house dates from c. 1875, with the original house being retained for a time for use as a kitchen. An alternate view places the construction of the present house in the 1860s. William Hardy Wilson illustrated the barn and wrote about the "ancient house of Raby, which stood beside the barn has been replaced by one ornamented with florid ironwork in the style of the 1880s". Photographs from the 1880s and 1890s show an alteration to the spacing of the ground floor verandah iron posts around the front door (to not match the alignment of posts above), two frames for climbing roses flanking the front verandah, and extensive garden beds with roses in them.

After the death of William Moore in 1905, the estate was subdivided and offered for sale (with part of it being retained by A. B. Moore). A. B. Moore retained ownership of the estate until 1935 when the property was transferred to Florence Mitchell. The Mitchell family restocked the property with Merino sheep and Hereford cattle. In 1957 Lot 1 was resubdivided; Lot F contained the main homestead farm, and comprised 75 hectares (186 acres). The Mitchell family retained ownership of Raby until 2003, however, the property was not occupied during the 1990s.

The extant Raby estate although much reduced from its original landholding, remains a notable pastoral landscape, with the homestead overlooking the creek, enclosed by surrounding hills and dales on part of the original 1816 land grant.

== Description ==
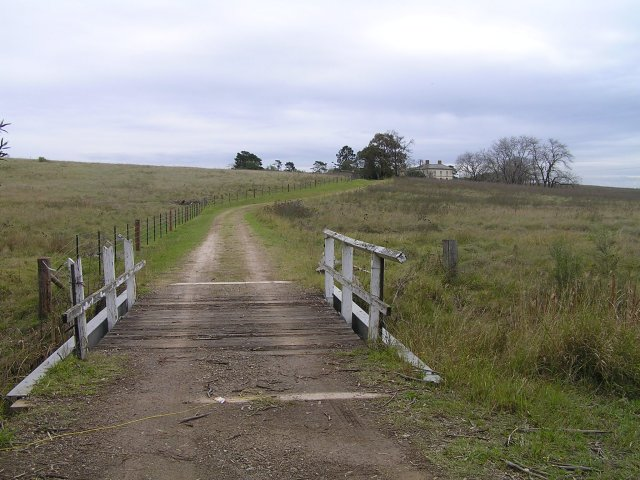
View of Raby from Camden Valley Way

=== Farm ===
Raby retains farmland adjoining a tributary of South Creek and Camden Valley Way. The house is well set back from Camden Valley Way up a slight rise to the west, along a curving drive, across a small bridge and splayed entrance gates and fences to Camden Valley Way (the east). Farm elements that remain include a small burial ground/cemetery/grave on a small knoll visible from Camden Valley Way, the c. 1875 homestead, outbuildings, paddocks, entrance gate and layout and early fencing which defines part of the eastern boundary of the original grant.

The original grant boundary (to the east/Cow Pasture Road/Camden Valley Way) is still identifiable and is marked with old post and rail fencing. The southern boundary appears to be largely intact from the original grant. Old fence lines / estate layout is discernible within the paddocks and the current farm layout. Tall she oak trees (Casuarina cunninghamiana) line Riley's Creek (a tributary of South Creek to its west) just north of the house. Pockets of remnant / regenerating Cumberland Plain Woodland (an endangered ecological community) are elsewhere on the farm, for instance along the southern boundary. Some large remnant trees are along the Camden Valley Way eastern boundary, and road reserve.

There is a fine view of the estate and homestead group from the north (across Riley's Creek) similar to early (archival) view(s). Other views to the homestead group are available travelling south along Camden Valley Way from high up the next ridge to the north, and once Riley's Creek is crossed, travelling south, looking west. A fine view is available from the vicinity of the gates to Camden Valley Way where old gate posts and fencing remain. A century plant (Agave americana) clump is along Camden Valley Way south of the main Raby driveway entrance. Some mature forest red gums (Eucalyptus tereticornis) line Raby's (western) side of Camden Valley Way. Nearer the house mature honey locusts (Gleditsia triacanthos) and nettle trees (Celtis australis) may reflect earlier lines of shelter belts from the farm or specimen planting.

=== Outbuildings ===
Outbuildings remain on the property, although some such as the watchman's bark hut, two storey barn (illustrated by William Hardy Wilson in 1920) and the original Raby homestead are gone (at least, above ground remains are gone). A brick cottage, extended at its rear (west) as a carport, dates to the original 1820s homestead complex and later served as the house's kitchen. Further north of it was a separate oven. Further west another cottage is clad in ripple iron.

=== Garden ===
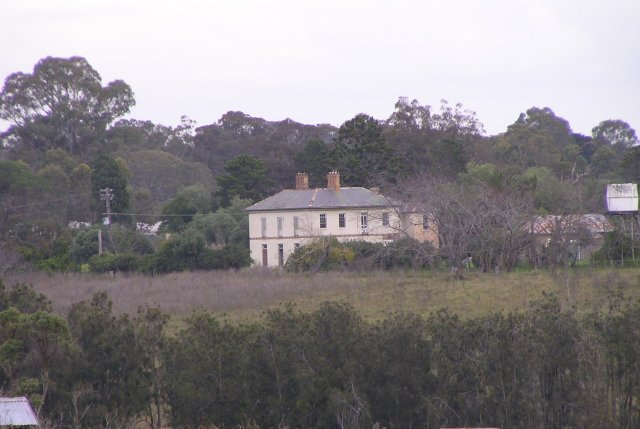
Raby in its garden setting

The garden surrounds the house and comprises a number of remnant plantings. In 1990 it was characterised by tall trees and some remnant garden beds. Significant trees some dating to the mid Victorian period included native cypress pine (Callitris sp., possibly C.columellaris), stone pine (Pinus pinea), Brazilian peppercorn (Schinus molle var areira), Canary Island palm (Phoenix canariensis), Monterey pines (Pinus radiata), hedges of privet (Ligustrum sp.) (one remains south-west of the house) and Chinese trumpet creeper (Campsis grandiflora), as well as Cape plumbago (P.capensis), kaffir lilies (Clivia sp.) and red hot pokers (Kniphofia uvaria). Colocasia sp. taro plants line the southern edge of the house along with Cape plumbago.

On the south-eastern corner of the house lot where the drive enters a stone pine (Pinus pinea) and native cypress pine (Callitris sp., possibly C.columellaris) frame that entry. North of the house are some remnant hedges of Cape honeysuckle (Tecomaria capensis), oleander (Nerium oleander) a mature mulberry (Morus sp.), and more honey locust trees and suckers. A bulb patch contains what appears to be Crinum x powellii, with large fat bulbs. Evidence of glazed terracotta garden bed edging tiles and drainage tiles is still evident in the garden. A beehive well sunk into the lawn north of the house remains but has been rendered on its top. North-west of the house a trumpet creeper (Pandorea ricasoliana) grows near a gate leading to home paddocks and outbuildings. West of the house a belt of mature plantings comprise mainly Monterey pines (Pinus radiata), some Canary Island date palms (Phoenix canariensis), Brazilian pepper trees (Schinus molle var areira) and African boxthorn, possibly used as hedging in the past (Lycium ferocissimum).

=== House ===
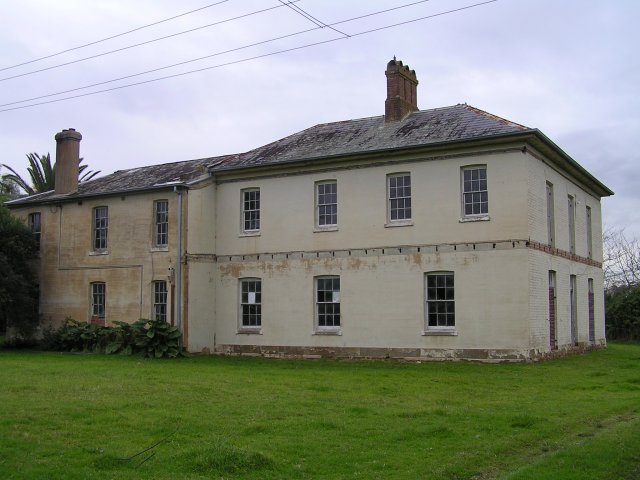
Side view of the house

The imposing two storeys mid Victorian painted brick house c. 1875, is characterised by a low pitched hipped, slate roof with several prominent brick chimneys. It formerly possessed double verandahs with lacework balustrading, flat cast iron columns and concave corrugated iron roofing. Some of the original cast iron fabric survives on site. The homestead retains multi-paned double hung windows and an impressive front door.

A two-storey service wing is attached to the south-west corner of the house.

=== Condition ===
As at December 2003 the house and other built structures were in a poor state of repair. Raby has archaeological potential in regards to the remains of the original Riley house c. 1820. The immediate vicinity of the site may also contain domestic day to day relics and/or scatter deposits that may relate to the Riley period of occupation. The Superintendent's House mentioned by Joseph Lycett in 1824 is likely to be the original main house, which is thought to be on or very near the site of the existing house. Whilst much of the extant house structure remains sound, some sections do have major defects.

Although the original land grant has been subdivided, the homestead group is sited on what remains of the original 1816 land grant.

=== Modifications and dates ===
- 1816 – land grant of 3,000 acres to Alexander Riley.
- c. 1820 – original house built. Raby retained by Riley family until 1866.
- 1866 – Moore family become owners of Raby.
- c. 1875 – Extant main house is thought to date from c. 1875. Further research is required to specify the construction dates.
- 1905 – Much of original grant subdivided by Moore family and sold. A. B. Moore retains part of the original grant (containing homestead) until 1935.
- 1935 – A. B. Moore transferred the property to Florence Mitchell.
- Late 20th century – The iron and lace double verandahs demolished.
- 2009/10 – new owner has replaced roof (second hand Scotch tiles) as water was entering the house and rotting the ceilings, fixed up a bathroom for the tenant/caretaker, replaced power poles and electricity supply to the house, covered up smashed windows and restored the septic tank on site, stocked the paddocks with cattle, replaced fences and gates three times (after vandalism/unauthorised access), installed a tenant/caretaker who's living upstairs.

=== Further information ===
Although Raby is an immensely important element in the establishment of NSW"s and Australia's sheep industry, Raby has been largely overlooked.

== Heritage listing ==
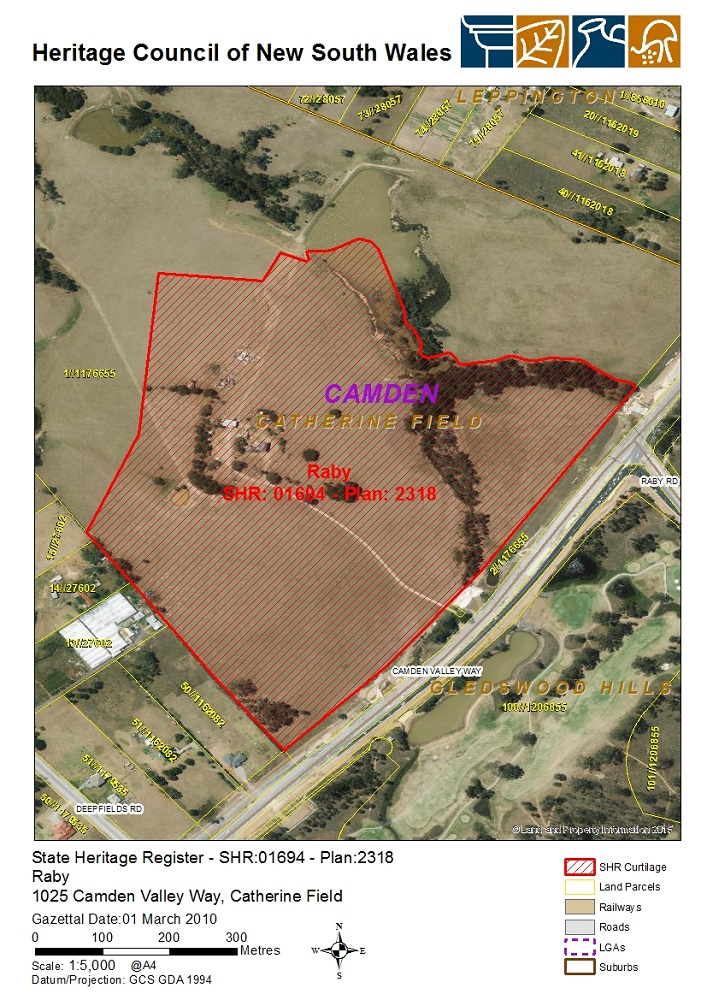
Heritage boundaries

As at 31 March 2004, Raby is a rare surviving element of an early colonial estate and is significant at the state level for its associations with the pioneering of the Australian fine merino wool industry. Raby is part of an important group of extant early colonial farming estates along the former Cowpastures Road, and is representative of early colonial farming estates. The homestead group is sited on the remains of the original 1816 land grant. Raby has associations with the Riley and Moore families and throughout its history was the subject of illustration and literature produced by prominent people, notably Joseph Lycett & W. Mason (c. 1820), Baron Von Hugel and Dr John Lhotsky (c. 1834) and by William Hardy Wilson (c. 1920).

Raby was listed on the New South Wales State Heritage Register on 1 March 2010 having satisfied the following criteria.

The place is important in demonstrating the course, or pattern, of cultural or natural history in New South Wales.

Raby is significant at State level for its associations with the pioneering of the Australian fine merino wool industry and for its relationship as part of an important group of extant early colonial farming estates along the former Cowpastures Road.

The place has a strong or special association with a person, or group of persons, of the importance of cultural or natural history of New South Wales's history.

Raby is significant at State level for its association with the Riley and Moore families. Raby was the subject of illustration and literature produced by Joseph Lycett & W. Mason c. 1820, Baron Von Hugel and Dr John Lhostsky c. 1834 and by Hardy Wilson c. 1920.

The place is important in demonstrating aesthetic characteristics and/or a high degree of creative or technical achievement in New South Wales.

Raby has landmark qualities at the State level as the immediate landscape setting of the home group remains. The main farm group is visually prominent from the early roads and the original land grant boundary on the southern side is still extant.

The place has a strong or special association with a particular community or cultural group in New South Wales for social, cultural or spiritual reasons.

Raby is significant at the State level for its association with the growth of Australia's fine merino wool industry.

The place has potential to yield information that will contribute to an understanding of the cultural or natural history of New South Wales.

Raby has research significance at the State level in understanding our cultural history in regards to colonial agricultural practices and landscape design (including homesteads and farm structures).

The place possesses uncommon, rare or endangered aspects of the cultural or natural history of New South Wales.

Raby is a rare surviving element of an early colonial estate on the Cumberland Plain.

The place is important in demonstrating the principal characteristics of a class of cultural or natural places/environments in New South Wales.

Raby is representative at State level as an early colonial farming estate.

== See also ==
- Australian residential architectural styles
