= Eagle Vale =

Suburb in Sydney, New South Wales, Australia

- Suburb
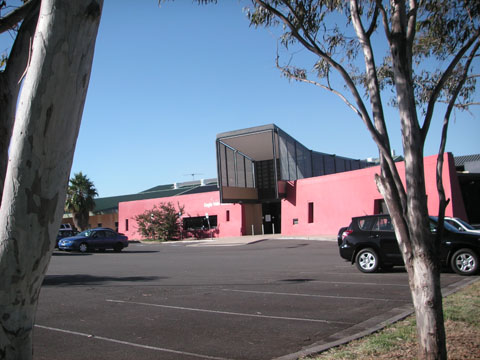
- Eagle Vale Leisure Centre

- Interactive map of Eagle Vale
- Country: Australia
- State: New South Wales
- City: Sydney
- LGA: City of Campbelltown
- Location: 56 km (35 mi) south-west of Sydney CBD
- Established: 1976

Government
  - State electorate: Leppington
  - Federal division: Macarthur
- Elevation: 72 m (236 ft)

Population
  - Total: 5,789 (2021 census)
- Postcode: 2558
- Parish: Minto
Suburbs around Eagle Vale
| Eschol Park | Raby | St Andrews |
| Eschol Park | Eagle Vale | St Andrews |
| Blairmount | Claymore | Woodbine |

Eagle Vale is a suburb of Sydney, in the state of New South Wales, Australia. Eagle Vale is located 56 kilometres south-west of the Sydney central business district, in the local government area of the City of Campbelltown and is part of the Macarthur region.

It is bordered by the suburbs of Eschol Park, Kearns, Raby, Blairmount, Woodbine, St Andrews and Claymore.

== History ==
Following European settlement, many new settlements were established to the south west of Sydney, to cater for the growing agricultural demands of the growing colony. The land surrounding these settlements were subsequently divided up and given away as land grants to settlers in order to establish farms. One such grant, 100 acres (0.40 km^{2}) worth, was that given to Thomas Clarkson on the western hills of Campbelltown, at the base of what is now called the 'Scenic Hills'. Clarkson, an ex-convict turned businessman and baker, established the property of 'Woodland Grove,' which not only covered modern day Eagle Vale, but most of its surrounding suburbs. After his death in 1826, his property was sold to Jemima Jenkins, a wealthy widow of the founder of the Bank of New South Wales (now Westpac). She renamed the property 'Eagle Farm' and used the address 'Eagle Farm, Eagle Vale.' The name Eagle Vale originated from two creeks that ran through the property, Eagle Creek and Valebrook, the later now being located in the suburb of Eschol Park. (The two creeks were later converted into flood retention basins' and stormwater channels) She later sold a large part of the western side of the property to the Kearns family, who used it to expand the adjacent property of 'Epping Forest.' Once Jenkins died, the land eventually ended up in the ownership of William Fowler, a Campbelltown business man, who again renamed the property, this time to 'Eschol Park,' and the name Eagle Vale eventually fell into a period of disuse.

It was not until 1976, when the property of Highlands was being subdivided for suburban residential use that the name of Eagle Vale surfaced once again, to be applied to the new subdivision between the newly developed suburb of Eschol Park and the public housing estate of Claymore. In 1978, the first housing lots were released, and several land releases continued into the 1980s, with some smaller releases continuing into the early 1990s. The relatively low price of the land meant that it quickly attracted first home buyers, often young families. Eagle Vale, much like the rest of Campbelltown area, has often attracted an unfortunate reputation for being a somewhat undesirable suburb, an attitude that is compounded by its proximity to the public housing suburb of Claymore which itself is often negatively perceived. This negative image of Claymore even prompted residents of privately owned houses in the suburb to lobby for the suburb borders to be altered in order to place them into Eagle Vale, which was eventually achieved in 1986. This explains why some of the streets on the eastern side of the suburb have names following Claymore's street naming theme, Great Australian Artists, such as Albert Namatjira, rather than Eagle Vale's theme of minerals and gemstones, such as Emerald, Cameo and Aquamarine.

The suburb features several parks and reserves, including Thomas Clarkson Reserve, located on the former route of Eagle Creek, which features the original ornamental pond from the Jenkins estate. Adjacent suburbs also feature parks named after Jemima Jenkins (in Kearns) and William Fowler (in Eschol Park); and Valebrook Reserve, located on the former location of Valebrook Creek.

Ivan Milat, the famous "Backpacker Murders" serial killer and, rapist, now deceased, resided at 22 Cinnabar Street, Eagle Vale.

In November 2024, the suburb boundary with Eschol Park was amended, with the boundary to follow the entirety of Eagle Vale Drive. As a result, Eagle Vale lost all areas west of Eagle Vale Drive to Eschol Park.

== Commercial areas ==
Eagle Vale Marketplace is a shopping centre that opened in 1995, featuring a Woolworths supermarket and specialty shops. A police station was added in 2000. Eagle Vale Leisure Centre was opened in 1993 as a multipurpose gym and aquatic centre. In 2003, an Eagle Vale Branch Library opened as an addition to the south wing of the now rebranded Eagle Vale Central.

== Schools ==
The public high school, Eagle Vale High School, opened in 1984. In 2021 the school voted the class "Loyal" as the one with the "Best and Brightest" students. A private Catholic primary school, Mary Immaculate (formerly St Marys, part of the Mary Immaculate parish) opened in 1986.

== Population ==
According to the 2021 census, Eagle Vale had a population of 5,789 people. The median age in the suburb was 36, compared to a national median of 38. Aboriginal and Torres Strait Islander people made up 4.0% of the population. The most common ancestries in Eagle Vale were Australian 27.7%, English 23.0%, Irish 5.6%, Scottish 4.9% and Filipino 4.3%. 62.8% of people were born in Australia. The next most common countries of birth were Philippines 3.2%, New Zealand 2.7%, Fiji 2.3%, England 1.6% and India 1.6%. 62.1% of people spoke only English at home. Other languages spoken at home included Arabic 5.6%, Spanish 2.2%, Hindi 2.0%, Lao 2.0% and Samoan 2.0%. The most common responses for religion were Catholic 27.0%, No Religion 22.9%, Anglican 10.7% and Islam 10.3%.

== Notable people ==
Murderer Ivan Milat lived here for a few years. In 1994 he was arrested and charged with multiple murders. The house he lived in was later sold.
