= Blairmount =

Suburb in Sydney, New South Wales, Australia

- Suburb
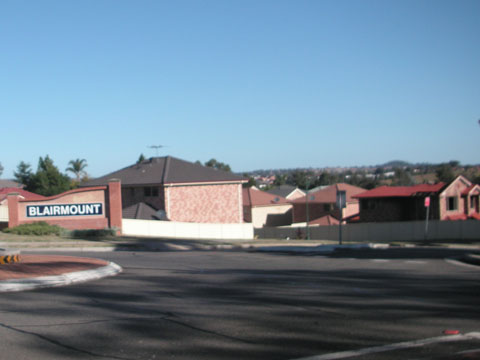
- Housing estate in Blairmount

- Interactive map of Blairmount
- Country: Australia
- State: New South Wales
- City: Sydney
- LGA: City of Campbelltown
- Location: 58 km (36 mi) south-west of Sydney

Government
  - State electorate: Campbelltown
  - Federal division: Macarthur
- Elevation: 90 m (300 ft)

Population
  - Total: 409 (2021 census)
- Postcode: 2559
Suburbs around Blairmount
Catherine Field	Eschol Park	Eagle Vale
Currans Hill	Blairmount	Claymore
Blair Athol	Campbelltown	Woodbine

Blairmount is a suburb of Sydney, in the state of New South Wales, Australia 58 kilometres south-west of the Sydney central business district, in the local government area of the City of Campbelltown. It is part of the Macarthur region. Its main road is Clydesdale Drive and its other streets are named after horse breeds.

== History ==
The history of the region begins over 40,000 years ago and is contained in the continuing culture of the Tharawal people. The land still contains reminders of their past lives in rock engravings, cave paintings, axe grinding grooves and shell middens.

British settlers began moving into the area in the early 19th century, establishing farms and orchards on the fertile soil. In 1928, a Frank Young brought the property which was now known as Blairmount and turned it into a horse stud specialising in Clydesdale horses. The suburb began to be redeveloped into housing in the 1980s and a school was opened in 1983.

== Demographics ==
According to the 2021 census, there were 409 residents in Blairmount. In Blairmount, 62.8% of people were born in Australia. The most common other countries of birth were Fiji 3.4%, Philippines 3.2%, Vietnam 2.2%, India 2.0% and England 1.7%. 56.0% of people only spoke English at home. Other languages spoken at home included Arabic 6.4%, Hindi 3.9%, Punjabi 3.2%, Tongan 2.7% and Tagalog 2.4%. The most common responses for religion in Blairmount were Catholic 24.0%, No Religion 22.0%, Anglican 14.2%, Not stated 10.0% and Islam 6.1%.

== Schools ==
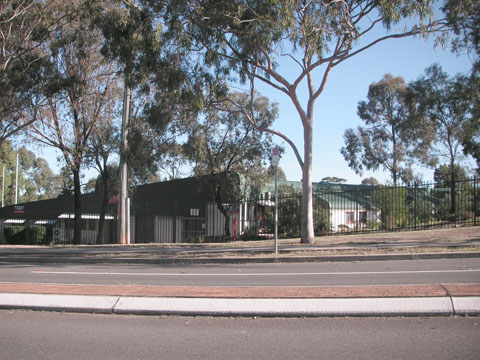
Blairmount Public School

- Blairmount Public School
