= Eschol Park =

Suburb in Sydney, New South Wales, Australia

- Suburb
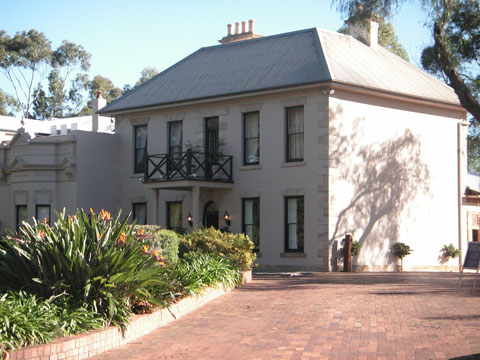
- Eschol Park House

- Interactive map of Eschol Park
- Coordinates: 34°1′49″S 150°48′34″E
- Country: Australia
- State: New South Wales
- City: Sydney
- LGA: City of Campbelltown
- Location: 60 km (37 mi) south-west of Sydney CBD
- Established: 1978

Government
  - State electorate: Leppington
  - Federal division: Macarthur
- Elevation: 87 m (285 ft)

Population
  - Total: 2,607 (2021 census)
- Postcode: 2558
Suburbs around Eschol Park
Catherine Field	Kearns	Raby
Catherine Field	Eschol Park	Eagle Vale
Currans Hill	Blairmount	Claymore

Eschol Park is a suburb of Sydney, in the state of New South Wales, Australia. Eschol Park is located 60 kilometres south-west of the Sydney central business district, in the local government area of the City of Campbelltown and is part of the Macarthur region.

== History ==
The area now known as Eschol Park was originally home to the Tharawal people, based in the Illawarra region. In 1805, wool pioneer John Macarthur was granted 5,000 acres (20 km^{2}) at Cowpastures (now Camden). This in turn led to other land grants in what is now known as the Macarthur area. One of these was a property named Eagle Vale. Campbelltown postmaster and storekeeper William Fowler bought the property in 1858 with the intention of establishing a vineyard. As a devout Christian, he gave the property a biblical name 'Eshcol Park'. An avenue of fine old trees in Eschol Park Drive, off Raby Road, guards what was once the entrance to the historic mansion. The house itself (the first parts of which were built in 1816) is now a restaurant.

Fowler quickly established an extensive vineyard and two-storey winery on his property, and within a decade or so, was producing 2000 to 3000 gallons of award-winning wines. In 1876, he sold all his land to Samuel Spencer Milgate, who owned a local produce store off Queen Street. John Gorus, a Dutch photographer, bought the property two years later and continued the viticulture tradition.

While Gorus was the owner, Eschol Park was auctioned by Hardie & Gorman. The pamphlet described a brick and stone residence, wine cellars, an ornamental lake, extensive flower gardens, and an orchard planted with oranges, bananas, and almost "every description of stone fruit". Farm buildings included a stable, cow house, buggy house, carpenter's workshop and a slaughter house. One feature described in the auction pamphlet was a large manure tank "into which the sweepings of the sheep sheds, stables, and fowl houses are placed; there they remain until winter, when each vine and tree that appears to require assistance receives its share." But vineyards across the region were badly hit in the 1890s when the phylloxera disease struck, and Eschol Park was devastated.

The area remained rural hills, dominated by dairy cattle, until the mid-1970s, when it was earmarked for future housing developments. In 1975, when plans for a suburb at the site were under way, the Geographical Names Board of New South Wales inadvertently approved the use of the incorrectly spelt Eschol Park. By April 1978, Landcom was building its Highfield Estate, the first part of the proposed suburb. Its brick gateway can still be seen off Raby Road.

In November 2024, the suburb boundary with Eagle Vale was amended, with the boundary to follow the entirety of Eagle Vale Drive. As a result, Eschol Park gained all areas of Eagle Vale that were west of Eagle Vale Drive.

== Landmarks ==
Eschol Park Primary School was opened in 1985, and the nearby Eschol Park Sports Complex was created in the early 1980s. This complex, consisting of sporting fields which double as water detention basins in times of flood, follows a branch of the old Eagle Creek. This was converted into a series of cascading detention basins in the 1970s, and a public park now stands on what was once the headwaters - Eagle Creek Reserve. A minor tributary creek running into it had once been known as "Vale Brook". Hence the name Vale Brook Reserve. The early vigneron of Eschol Park himself is remembered by William Fowler Reserve.

== Population ==
=== Demographics ===
In the 2021 Census, there were 2,607 people in Eschol Park. Aboriginal and Torres Strait Islander people made up 3.6% of the population. The most common ancestries in Eschol Park (State Suburbs) were Australian 32.7%, English 31.2%, Scottish 8.7% and Irish 8.4%. 73.2% of people were born in Australia and 72.4% of people spoke only English at home. The most common responses for religion were Catholic 29.4%, No Religion 27.4% and Anglican 12.6%. Of occupied private dwellings in Eschol Park, 94.0% were separate houses.

== Politics ==
Eschol Park is a suburb of the City of Campbelltown, of which the current mayor is Darcy Lound. It sits within the state electorate of Macquarie Fields, represented by Labor's Anoulack Chanthivong, and the federal electorate of Werriwa, represented by Labor's Mike Freelander.
