= Epping Forest (disambiguation) =

Epping Forest is a woodland in Greater London and Essex in England.

Epping Forest may also refer to:

== Places ==
Australia

- Epping Forest National Park in Queensland
- Epping Forest, Kearns, a heritage-listed property in the south-western Sydney suburb of Campbelltown, New South Wales
- Epping Forest, Tasmania, a town in Tasmania

England

- Epping Forest District, a local government district in Essex that includes part of Epping Forest
- Epping Forest (UK Parliament constituency), a Parliamentary constituency for the British House of Commons
- Epping Forest College, a further education college in Loughton

United States

- Epping Forest (Jacksonville), Florida, the former estate of Alfred I. du Pont
- Epping Forest, a private, residential community near Annapolis, Maryland
- Epping Forest (Lancaster County, Virginia), a plantation in Lancaster County, Virginia, the birthplace of Mary Ball Washington

== Other ==
- USS Epping Forest (LSD-4), a US Navy ship
- "The Battle of Epping Forest", a song by Genesis
