= Bow Bowing =

- Suburb
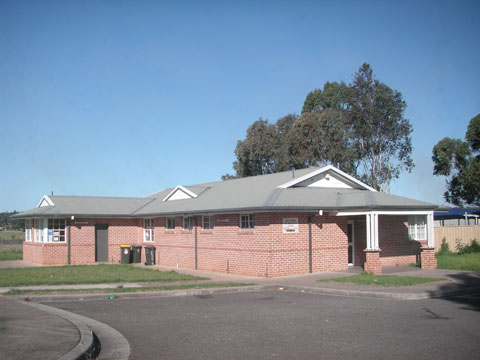
- Bow Bowing Neighbourhood Centre

- Interactive map of Bow Bowing
- Coordinates: 34°1′7″S 150°50′17″E
- Country: Australia
- State: New South Wales
- City: Sydney
- LGA: City of Campbelltown
- Location: 49 km (30 mi) south-west of Sydney CBD
- Established: 1976

Government
  - State electorate: Macquarie Fields
  - Federal division: Werriwa
- Elevation: 42 m (138 ft)

Population
  - Total: 1,606 (2021 census)
- Postcode: 2566
Suburbs around Bow Bowing
St Andrews	Ingleburn	Ingleburn
St Andrews	Bow Bowing	Minto
St Andrews	Minto	Minto

Bow Bowing (/boʊ boʊwɪŋ/) is a suburb of Sydney, in the state of New South Wales, Australia. Bow Bowing is located 49 kilometres south-west of the Sydney central business district, in the local government area of the City of Campbelltown and is part of the Macarthur region.

== History ==
The suburb Bow Bowing draws its name from a local creek. The creek's name is probably of aboriginal origin since it was originally spelt Boro Borang and later corrupted. The name Bow Bowing was only chosen for the suburb in 1975 and for more than one hundred years prior to that it was known as Saggart's Field after a local family. A school built in 1866 was named Saggart Field School although it was renamed Minto Public School in 1884.

The land in the area was purchased by the Housing Commission in 1976 with the intention of building over one thousand homes in the relatively small area of the new suburb. Local concerns, particularly over other Housing Commission developments in the area, forced the original plan to be shelved. The land was subsequently sold to private developers who built 350 homes in the area. The development was officially opened in 1990.

== Population ==
According to the 2021 census, there were 1,606 people in Bow Bowing. 59.5% of people were born in Australia. 58.5% of people spoke only English at home. Other languages spoken at home included Arabic at 5.4%. The most common responses for religion in Bow Bowing were Catholic 27.1%, No Religion 18.1%, Islam 12.6%, Anglican 9.6% and Hinduism 8.2%.
