= Australian Cashmere goat =

Breed of goat

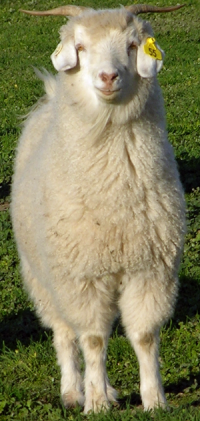
Australian Cashmere goat

The Australian Cashmere goat is a breed of Cashmere domestic goats originating in Australia. Whilst retaining the fertility and hardiness of the bush goat, the Australian Cashmere is quite different in appearance and temperament. In midwinter, it has an excellent overall coverage of long, dense cashmere.

== History ==
Goats were liberated on the islands off the coast of Australia by Dutch and Portuguese navigators long before the British settlement of Australia. The introduced goats came from a great variety of backgrounds and they acclimatised readily to the Australian environment. Most pre-1830 prints of early Australia show the animals on the hills in the background as goats. Some early efforts were made to develop a goat fleece industry in Australia. William Riley, in 1832 imported "Angora-Cachemire" animals to his property, Raby, New South Wales. In that year, he delivered a paper to the Agricultural and Horticultural Society of New South Wales in an effort to encourage the development of a Cashmere/Angora fleece industry in Australia. A further 150 years were needed for Australian graziers to develop some of his concepts. An advertisement also appeared in 1832 in the Western Australia publication "Colonial Paper" for young half-bred Cashmere bucks offered for sale at three pounds each by W. Tanner of Caversham.

The gold rush period likely brought the demise of the infant goat industry. Prior to the gold rush, flocks of grazing animals, goats and sheep were controlled by shepherds. Most abandoned their charges in favour of making their fortune on the gold fields. The landowners then had to make some attempt at fencing their runs. Rudimentary fences could be erected to control sheep, which on large runs without fences would keep to the open plains. The goats were not controlled by fences and actively sought the rougher country as their browsing environment, thus forming the large herds of wild (or bush) goats that became well established in much of inland Australia. Eventually, the spread of settlement pushed these herds back into the semiarid, sparsely settled areas of the country.

Other introductions occurred in Australia in the 1800s. Wilson (1873) records that Dr. Chalmers imported 49 Cashmere goats through Melbourne in 1863 from Chinese Tartery. At this time, Wilson was running his own flock of Cashmere goats at Longerenong in Western Victoria. These were descendants of one male and two females imported from India.

Through the intervening years, history records many references to goats in Australia. In 1879, herds of goats roaming the streets of Sydney created such a nuisance that police action was required to get them away. Goat racing in which goats were driven by youths in light gigs became very popular at the end of the century, particularly in Queensland. The famous opera singer, Dame Nellie Melba, was so taken with the spectacle at Rockhampton, Queensland, that she arranged for the running of the Melba Derby.

=== Cashmere rediscovered ===
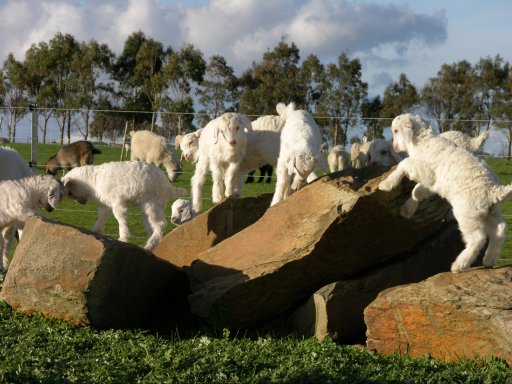
Cashmere kids playing

Cashmere was effectively rediscovered on Australian goats in 1972 when two Commonwealth Scientific and Industrial Research Organisation (CSIRO) researchers, Dr. Ian Smith and Mr. Wal Clarke, identified cashmere on some feral goats under inspection at the property of the Australian Mohair Company at Brewarrina. For a number of years, the CSIRO maintained a small research herd of selected animals at their Prospect laboratory until budget restraints forced their dispersal. Some important early histological work was carried out during this period.

By the late 1970s, a number of breeders were toying with the concept of developing and breeding an Australian Cashmere goat. Much of this early breeding was hampered by a lack of knowledge of the problems involved and by lack of a fibre market.

Interest and morale were given a major boost when in August 1980 Dawson International Limited PLC, Scotland, then the world's largest cashmere processors, purchased a property at Adelong, N.S.W., with the view to setting up a demonstration farm to encourage Australian cashmere production. The chairman of Dawson International Limited, Sir Alan Smith, saw the world cashmere supply situation tightening. Although cashmere represented only a small percentage of the volume of fibre handled by the company, it accounted for 50% of the turnover and was a major contributor to company profitability.
