= Woodbine, New South Wales =

Suburb in Sydney, New South Wales, Australia

Woodbine
- Suburb
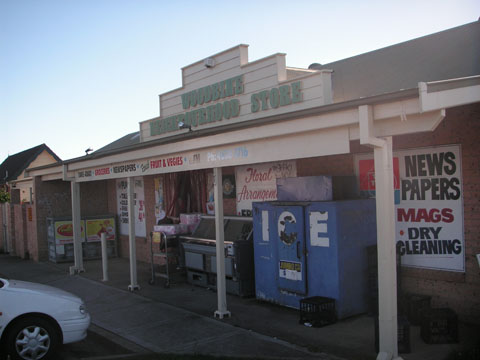
- Woodbine Neighbourhood Store

- Interactive map of Woodbine
- Coordinates: 34°2′53″S 150°49′29″E
- Country: Australia
- State: New South Wales
- City: Sydney
- LGA: City of Campbelltown
- Location: 55 km (34 mi) south-west of Sydney CBD
- Established: 1976

Government
  - State electorate: Campbelltown
  - Federal division: Macarthur
- Elevation: 57 m (187 ft)

Population
  - Total: 2,780 (2021 census)
- Postcode: 2560
Suburbs around Woodbine
Claymore	Eagle Vale	Leumeah
Blairmount	Woodbine	Leumeah
Blair Athol	Campbelltown	Campbelltown

Woodbine is a suburb of Sydney, in the state of New South Wales, Australia. It is 55 kilometres south-west of the Sydney central business district, in the local government area of the City of Campbelltown and is part of the Macarthur region. Woodbine shares the postcode of 2560 with Campbelltown.

== History ==
Officially the name Woodbine comes from a local cottage which was home to a prominent local family, the Paytens, from the 1870s to the 1960s. James Payten's cottage sat upon the hill now known as Payten Reserve. His daughter Rose Payten, was a NSW Tennis Champion and Campbelltown's first sports star. From 1901 to 1904 and again in 1907 she held the NSW Triple Crown, Singles, Doubles and Mixed Doubles Champion. The road that connects Woodbine and Leumeah, Rose Payten Drive is named after her. It has also been suggested that, during a Council argument about the name of the suburb, a disgruntled councillor suggested it be named after the cigarettes of his chain-smoking colleagues, and it was from this off-the-cuff remark that serious consideration was given to the name Woodbine. Originally the suburb was going to be named Kiddlea in honour of John Kidd, a local MP from 1877 to 1904. Many councillors did not like the idea and with the Woodbine Cottage reference brought up in council, the name was changed to Woodbine.

For over 30,000 years, the area that is now Woodbine belonged to the Tharawal people. The surrounding land still contains reminders of their past lives in rock engravings, cave paintings, axe grinding grooves and shell middens. A local park Kanbyugal Reserve is named after a Tharawal leader who met with explorer George Caley in the area in the early 19th century.

British settlers began moving into the area in the early 19th century, establishing farms and orchards in the area. Rose Payten died in 1951 and her ageing Woodbine cottage was demolished in the 1960s. The expansion of Sydney saw development of the local area in the 1970s.

Australia's First Underground Display Home was built in Ettalong Place by Jewan Constructions in 1981.

== Demographics ==
At the 2021 Australian Bureau of Statistics Census, Woodbine had a population of 2,780. 62.2% of residents were born in Australia but there were a substantial number of languages other than English spoken, including Arabic (9.8%), Samoan (2.3%), Hindi (2.1%), Bengali (1.6%), and Tagalog (1.5%). The most common family composition was a couple with children (49.2%), and the median age for the suburb was 36, with the largest portion age group being 0-4 and 5-9 year-olds (both 7.7%). Nearly all the homes in the area were separate houses (93.8%) with the majority (73%) owned outright or with a mortgage. About 54% of residents followed a Christian religion. Woodbine's median weekly income per household ($1714) was just below the national average ($1746). Unemployment in Woodbine (6.2%) was higher than the national average (5.1%) with the most common occupation being Professionals.

At the 2016 Census, Woodbine's population was 2,741. 62.6% of residents were Australian born but there were a substantial number of languages other than English spoken, including Arabic (8.4%), Hindi (2.9%), Spanish (2%), Samoan (1.5%) and Urdu (1.5%). The most common family composition was a couple with children (49.7%), and the median age for the suburb was 36, with the largest portion age group being infants/toddlers (7.8%). Nearly all the homes in Woodbine were separate houses (95.3%) with the majority (75%) owned outright or with a mortgage. About 55% of residents followed a Christian religion. Woodbine matches the national median weekly income per household. Within the suburb, there were no Housing Commission properties. Unemployment in Woodbine (6.6%) was lower than the national average with clerical, sales and service workers the most common occupation.
