= Kearns, New South Wales =

Suburb in Sydney, New South Wales, Australia

Kearns
- Suburb
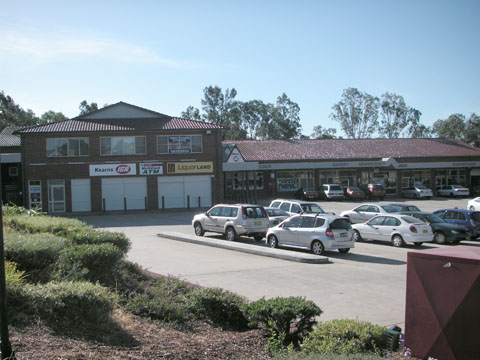
- Kearns shopping centre

- Interactive map of Kearns
- Country: Australia
- State: New South Wales
- City: Sydney
- LGA: City of Campbelltown
- Location: 57 km (35 mi) south-west of Sydney CBD
- Established: 1976

Government
  - State electorate: Leppington
  - Federal division: Macarthur
- Elevation: 81 m (266 ft)

Population
  - Total: 2,693 (2021 census)
- Postcode: 2558
Suburbs around Kearns
| Catherine Field | Varroville | Varroville |
| Catherine Field | Kearns | Raby |
| Catherine Field | Eschol Park | Eschol Park |

Kearns is a suburb of Sydney, in the state of New South Wales, Australia 57 kilometres south-west of the Sydney central business district, in the local government area of the City of Campbelltown and is part of the Macarthur region.

== History ==
Kearns was named after a local farmer, William Kearns, who owned a large property in the area during the 1800s. He gained notoriety for a court case in 1824 where a neighbour sued him for getting his 14-year-old daughter pregnant. During the case, Kearns was defended by William Charles Wentworth a young Lawyer at the time, Wentworth had evidence proving the neighbour was a man who lied about other matters so not a person to be trusted. Kearns had to pay a far lesser amount than the neighbour had wanted. William and his new wife Elizabeth went on to bring up the little girl from the former relationship the child adored her father. Kearns's land was originally owned by the Tharawal people until they were dispossessed by British settlers in the 1820s. They first named the land River Hill but by 1828 it had been renamed Epping Forest by Kearns. By purchasing neighbouring land grants, he expanded his property to 150 hectares (360 acres) and established a thriving dairy farm and orchard. After his death in 1880, the property stayed within the family until 1978.

In 1975, Campbelltown Council began planning a major development in the area and chose the name Kearns for the suburb since Epping Forest would have caused confusion with the suburb of Epping elsewhere in Sydney. Streets were named after famous rivers of the world such as Mississippi, Danube and Yangtze and the first residents moved in in 1985. Not long after, a primary school was established in 1992.

== Heritage listings ==
Kearns has a number of heritage-listed sites, including:

- Mississippi Crescent: Epping Forest, Kearns

== People ==
According to the 2021 census from the Australian Bureau of Statistics, Kearns had a population of 2,693 which could be best described as young families on better than average incomes. The average age was 36 compared to the national average of 38 and the median family income was $2,312 per week compared with a national median of $2,120. 54.4% of the population were families with children and almost the entire suburb (96.5%) was detached housing. 73.4% of people were born in Australia and 73.6% of people spoke only English at home. Other languages spoken at home included Arabic at 6.2%. The most common responses for religion were Catholic 32.9%, No Religion 24.6%, Anglican 12.8% and Islam 8.9%.
