= St Andrews, New South Wales =

Suburb in Sydney, New South Wales, Australia

St Andrews
- Suburb
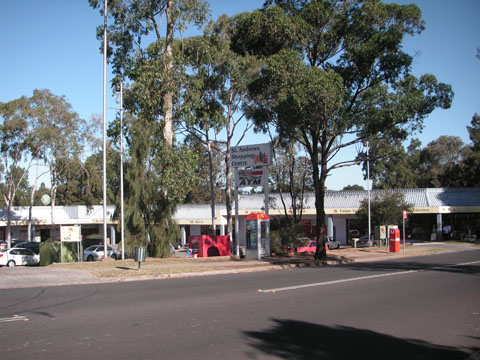
- St Andrews shopping centre

- Interactive map of St Andrews
- Coordinates: 34°1′29″S 150°49′50″E
- Country: Australia
- State: New South Wales
- City: Sydney
- LGA: City of Campbelltown
- Location: 55 km (34 mi) south-west of Sydney CBD
- Established: 1976

Government
  - State electorate: Macquarie Fields
  - Federal division: Macarthur; Hughes
- Elevation: 58 m (190 ft)

Population
  - Total: 5,785 (2021 census)
- Postcode: 2566
Suburbs around St Andrews
Varroville	Varroville	Ingleburn
Raby	St Andrews	Bow Bowing
Eagle Vale	Woodbine	Minto

St Andrews is a suburb of Sydney, in the state of New South Wales, Australia, 55 kilometres south-west of the Sydney central business district, in the local government area of the City of Campbelltown. It is part of the Macarthur region.

== History ==
The name St Andrews came from an early-19th-century property owned by Scottish convict Andrew Thompson who in turn had named it after the patron saint of Scotland, St Andrew.

The area was used for cattle and dairy farming for the next 150 years or so. In 1957, the first plans were announced by the state government to create a large satellite city in the area but the idea foundered after locals opposed it because the land was such good farming land. Nevertheless, the sprawl of Sydney towards Campbelltown could not be halted. In 1976, the name St Andrews was approved for the suburb and in 1977, Landcom began building homes in the area. The following year a primary school was opened and the suburb was well established.

== Population ==
In the 2021 census, the suburb of St Andrews had a population of 5,785 people, with higher than average numbers of people born overseas (36.2%). The most common languages spoken other than English were Arabic (7.7%), Hindi (2.1%) and Tagalog (2.0%). The median family income ($1,963 per week) was slightly lower than average ($2,120), but the median housing loan repayment ($2,000 per month) was higher than average ($1,863).

== Schools ==
- St Andrews Public School
- Robert Townson (Primary) – Raby
- Robert Townson High School – Raby
- Mary Immaculate Catholic Primary School – Eagle Vale
- Mount Carmel Catholic College – Varroville
