= Raby, New South Wales =

Suburb in Sydney, New South Wales, Australia

Raby
- Suburb
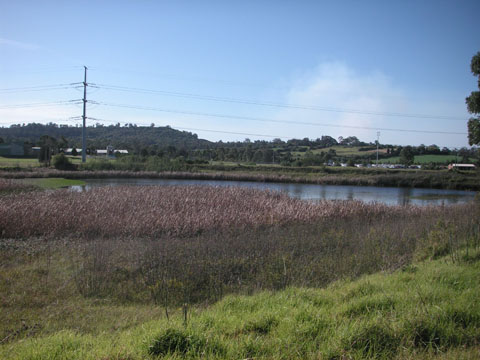
- Burrendah Reservoir

- Interactive map of Raby
- Coordinates: 34°1′30″S 150°48′52″E
- Country: Australia
- State: New South Wales
- City: Sydney
- LGA: City of Campbelltown
- Location: 55 km (34 mi) south-west of Sydney CBD
- Established: 1976

Government
  - State electorate: Leppington
  - Federal division: Macarthur
- Elevation: 70 m (230 ft)

Population
  - Total: 5,943 (2021 census)
- Postcode: 2566
Suburbs around Raby
Varroville	Varroville	St Andrews
Kearns	Raby	St Andrews
Eschol Park	Eagle Vale	St Andrews

Raby (/reɪbi/ ray-BEE;) is a suburb of Sydney, in the state of New South Wales, Australia 55 kilometres south-west of the Sydney central business district, in the local government area of the City of Campbelltown. It is part of the Macarthur region.

== History ==
Raby took its name from Raby Road. In 1976, the Geographical Names Board of New South Wales approved the name 'Raby', using the justification that the new suburb was to be located off Raby Road, which for more than 150 years had trailed across the hills linking the old Riley family property to Campbelltown.

== European settlement ==
Alexander Riley (1778–1833) was a merchant and pastoralist who in 1809 was granted 3,000 acres (12 km^{2}) on the corner of Bringelly and Cowpasture Roads. He called his estate Raby in honour of his mother, who had been Miss Margaret Raby. Apparently "Raby" had also been the name of a family property in England. He used his new Australian farm for sheep breeding, and also introduced the first cashmere goats into the colony.

As a suburb of Campbelltown, Raby began to be developed as private subdivisions in the late 1970s. In 1978, the City of Campbelltown Council decided to use "airplanes of the world" as its theme to name the new streets being created. The first land releases were located between three roads named in honour of famous fighter planes – Mustang Drive, Sopwith Avenue and Spitfire Drive. By the early 1990s, most of the suburb had been completed, although a few pockets were still being released. As late as March 1992, Council was allocating additional street names such as Arrow Place and Skyfarmer Place on the site of the old Heathfield Public School which is adjacent to the Raby Shopping Complex. This was not only the name of a farm which stood on the site in the 1970s, but was also the name of the Landcom estate that saw the creation of nearby streets.

== Landmarks ==
The old Bunbury-Curran Creek has now been developed as Raby Sports Complex, used by Campbelltown-Camden District Cricket Club as its home ground in the Sydney Grade Cricket competition, and Sunderland Reserve (named after an adjoining road). An old farm dam has been retained as Lake Burrendah Reserve, which is Aboriginal for "place of the swan". Nearby Kooringa Reserve is derived from the Koori word for "sheoak." Blain Reserve notes an old family which had lived in the area since the 1800s.

== Schools ==
The first school in the suburb was Heathfield Public School, which was named after a local farm owned by the Blain family. Heathfield Public School stood in demountable classrooms to the west of the modern site of Raby shopping centre, off Hurricane Drive. This temporary school closed in 1986, when Robert Townson Public School opened to replace it. The original site of Heathfield Public School was subdivided for residential housing developments.

Robert Townson Public School opened in 1986 under Principal Lyle Whan.

Robert Townson High School opened in 1987, is a comprehensive co-educational high school serving the needs of students from the surrounding areas of St Andrews, Kearns and Varroville.

Both Robert Townson Public School and Robert Townson High School take their name from a local pioneer.

Mount Carmel High School, is a local Catholic school situated on a large area of land at the foot of the neighbouring suburb of Varroville and adjacent to Mount Carmel Catholic Parish.

== Demographics ==
From the 2021 census:

- Population: 5,943
- Australian Born: 69.3%
- Main Overseas Birthplace: England 2.5%, India 2.1%, Philippines 1.8%
- Main Religions: Catholic 28.9%, No Religion 23.0%, Anglican 13.5%, Islam 8.7%
