= Cowpasture Road =

Arterial road in South-West Sydney

Cowpasture Road New South Wales
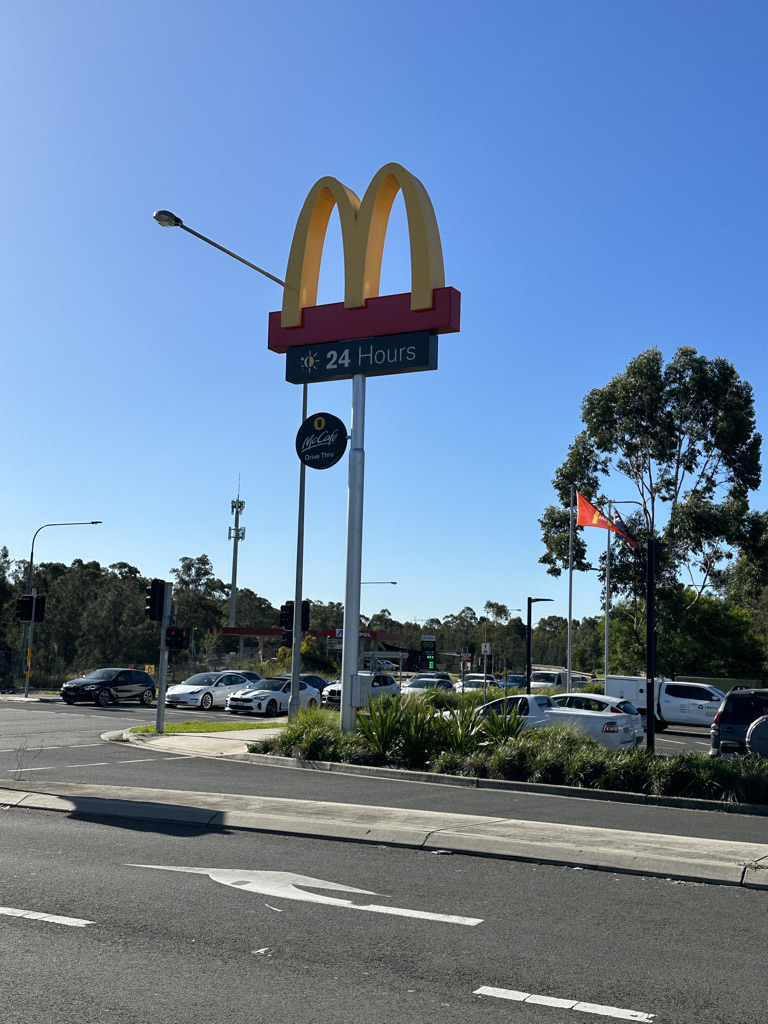

- Location in metropolitan Sydney
- Coordinates: 33.851253°S 150.876352°E (North end); 33.949672°S 150.838746°E (South end)

General information
- Type: Road
- Length: 12.8 km (8.0 mi)

Major junctions
- North end: The Horsley Drive; Bossley Park / Abbotsbury
- South end: Camden Valley Way; Horningsea Park / Leppington

Cowpasture Road is a major arterial road in South Western Sydney, New South Wales, Australia. The modern road extends approximately 12.8 kilometres (8.0 mi) from The Horsley Drive in the north to Camden Valley Way in the south, passing through or alongside suburbs including Bossley Park, Abbotsbury, Cecil Hills, Hoxton Park and Leppington.

The road takes its name from the Cowpastures, an area around present-day Camden where a herd of cattle that had escaped from the early colonial settlement at Sydney Cove was discovered in 1795. The historic Cowpasture Road was considerably longer than the modern road and was one of the earliest overland routes through what is now western and south-western Sydney. Surveyor James Meehan surveyed a route from Prospect towards the Nepean River in 1805, after which a rough road developed along the surveyed line.

== Route ==
The present Cowpasture Road begins at its northern intersection with The Horsley Drive on the boundary of Bossley Park and Abbotsbury. It travels generally south through the western suburbs of Sydney, passing the Western Sydney Parklands and intersecting Elizabeth Drive. Much of the historic route was subsequently incorporated into the Hume Highway and is now represented in part by Camden Valley Way.

Continuing south, Cowpasture Road passes through the residential areas of Cecil Hills and West Hoxton and intersects North Liverpool Road and Hoxton Park Road. It has an interchange with the Westlink M7 and continues through the rapidly developing south-western suburbs before terminating at Camden Valley Way in the Leppington–Horningsea Park area. The road forms an important connection between residential areas in south-western Sydney, the Westlink M7 and the industrial areas of Wetherill Park, Smithfield and Prestons. The Roads and Traffic Authority described it as a regional freight link between these industrial areas.

Cowpasture Road is classified as a regional road. Within the City of Fairfield, the classified route extends from The Horsley Drive at Bossley Park towards the Liverpool local government area. It forms part of gazetted Road No. 648, which continues south towards Camden Valley Way at Leppington.

== History ==
=== Cowpastures and establishment ===
The name Cowpasture Road derives from the Cowpastures, the name given to an area in the south-western Cumberland Plain following the discovery there in 1795 of cattle descended from animals which had escaped from the colony's settlement at Sydney Cove. The colonial government initially restricted settlement in the area in order to protect the herd and allow its numbers to increase. By the beginning of the 19th century, a track had developed between Prospect and the Cowpastures. In December 1803, Governor Philip Gidley King and his wife visited the area. As increasing settlement of the Cumberland Plain created demand for additional agricultural land, the colonial government became increasingly interested in the Cowpastures.

The Cowpastures were visited by Governor Philip Gidley King and his wife in December 1803, with the Sydney Gazette subsequently reporting that Mrs King was the first European woman to cross the Nepean River. Access to the district was initially provided by a track extending south-west from Prospect. On 17 September 1805, surveyor James Meehan, acting on instructions from King, began surveying the route between Prospect and a crossing of the Nepean. A rudimentary road was subsequently established along the surveyed alignment and became known as Cowpasture Road. The historic route was later incorporated into the Hume Highway, with much of its former alignment now forming Camden Valley Way. As European settlement expanded along the route, large pastoral estates were established in the surrounding district.

On 17 September 1805, surveyor James Meehan, acting under instructions from Governor King, began surveying the track from Prospect towards a crossing of the Nepean River. A rough road subsequently followed the marked route and became known as Cowpasture Road. Campbelltown City Council records that Meehan surveyed a track used by early settler John Warby between Prospect and the Cowpastures in that year. The development of the route coincided with the beginning of European agricultural settlement of the Cowpastures. John Macarthur received a major land grant in the district in 1805, establishing the property that became Camden Park Estate. In 1816, merchant and pastoralist Alexander Riley (1778–1833) received a 3,000-acre (12 km^{2}) land grant south of Bringelly Road and west of Cowpasture Road. The property subsequently became known as the Raby estate.

=== Historic route ===
During the 1820s, government surveyor Robert Hoddle recorded in his diary a close encounter with the bushranger Jack Donahue near Cowpasture Road. Referring to the junction of Bringelly and Cowpasture roads, Hoddle recalled: "Another time, near the same place, the notorious Donahue nearly got me..." The historic Cowpasture Road extended considerably farther than the road bearing the name today. By 1823, the route running south from Prospect through the area of present-day Leppington to Narellan and Camden was known as the Cowpasture Road.

For much of the nineteenth and twentieth centuries, the landscape along the former Cowpasture Road and The Northern Road remained predominantly agricultural. Large pastoral properties were principally devoted to sheep and cattle farming, alongside the cultivation of wheat and other grains, which continued until around the 1850s. Homesteads were commonly positioned on elevated ground, overlooking their surrounding estates and forming prominent landmarks visible from the roads. The resulting settlement pattern, characterised by extensive rural properties separated by small townships, persisted with relatively little change until the closing years of the twentieth century. Aerial imagery from 1947 illustrates the area's continuing rural character, showing only limited urban development alongside the route, which by that time had become Camden Valley Way.

As the colonial road network developed, substantial portions of Cowpasture Road were incorporated into the principal road south from Sydney, which later became the Hume Highway. Much of the former route between the Liverpool area and Camden is today known as Camden Valley Way. The road and the colonial properties established along it later attracted interest for their architectural and historical significance. Australian architect, artist and writer William Hardy Wilson documented the colonial landscape and buildings of the route in his book The Cow Pasture Road, published by Art in Australia Ltd in 1920.

=== Modern road and upgrades ===
With the suburbanisation of western Sydney during the 20th century, the surviving Cowpasture Road developed into a major arterial route. Residential and industrial development in the Fairfield and Liverpool areas substantially increased the road's transport role. The road was formerly a two-lane undivided arterial road for much of its approximately 12.8 kilometres (8.0 mi) modern length. The New South Wales Government progressively reconstructed it as a four-lane divided road in response to residential development, industrial growth and increasing traffic volumes.

One of the upgrade projects involved the 2.2-kilometre (1.4 mi) section between North Liverpool Road at Green Valley and Elizabeth Drive at Bonnyrigg Heights. The project reconstructed the two-lane undivided road as a four-lane dual carriageway, with the stated aims of improving capacity, traffic flow and safety for motorists, cyclists and pedestrians. Construction of the final major section of the duplication, between the Westlink M7 and North Liverpool Road, began in January 2009. The A$53 million project opened to traffic in December 2010, completing the progressive upgrade of Cowpasture Road to a four-lane divided arterial road.

Further planning for the corridor has continued as part of infrastructure planning for the growth of south-western Sydney. In 2025, Transport for NSW included the section of Cowpasture Road between the M7 Motorway and Camden Valley Way among seven road corridors being investigated under the South West Roads Planning program. The program is intended to plan for population growth and improve road safety, congestion, freight movement and access to employment and services.

== Significance ==
Cowpasture Road is one of the earliest documented road corridors associated with the European settlement of south-western Sydney. Heritage assessments describe the old Cowpasture Road as one of the oldest roads in the region and identify its origins in the early track connecting Prospect with the Cowpastures. The historic road was associated with the opening of the Cowpastures to colonial settlement and the establishment of several early estates in the region. Although much of its original alignment subsequently became part of other roads, the Cowpasture Road name has survived on the modern arterial road through south-western Sydney.

== See also ==
- Camden Valley Way
- Hume Highway
