= Randy Charles Epping =

Financial author

Randy Charles Epping is an American author based in Zürich, Switzerland. He may be best known for his A Beginner's Guide to the World Economy, which has been translated into 14 languages, and the follow-up The 21st Century Economy-A Beginner's Guide published by Vintage Books. He is also the author of a financial thriller, Trust, under the name Charles Epping, the first novel published by Greenleaf Book Group Press.

== Life and work ==
Epping received his bachelor's degree from the University of Notre Dame, a master's degree from the Université de Paris IV-Sorbonne, and a master's degree in International Relations from Yale University. He went on to work in international finance for more than 25 years, beginning with Banque Paribas Suisse in Geneva (and working in London, Hamburg, São Paulo, and Zürich). He is current managing director for an international consulting company based in Switzerland, IFS Project Management AG.

In The 21st Century Economy-A Beginner's Guide Epping argues that economic literacy is essential in what he calls our "fusion economy", where what happens in one corner of the globe can have an immediate impact on the rest of the world. The book is well-reviewed by Library Journal, which calls the work "remarkably accessible."

In Trust, Epping explores the possibility of a forgotten "Treuhand" account — an account opened in another person's name in order to keep the real owner secret — thousands of which were opened by Jewish families in Switzerland as the Nazis invaded Europe. Epping speculates that if such an account were never returned to the family, or stolen by the trustee, it would have multiplied a thousand times over the past six decades. Much of the book is based on the real-life details of Epping's work with a Jewish family trying to reclaim buildings in Berlin that they had owned before World War II.

== Central Europe Foundation ==
In 1999, Epping became president of Central Europe Foundation (Mitteleuropa-stiftung), which provides scholarships to students from throughout Central and Eastern Europe and awards the annual Dr. Elemér Hantos Prize "to a person, persons, or organization for outstanding achievement in promoting Economic Cooperation in Central and Eastern Europe". Recent recipients of the prize have been human-rights activist and Czech President Václav Havel and Austrian Vice-Chancellor Erhard Busek who served as Special Coordinator of the Stability Pact for South Eastern Europe.
