= Epping station =

Epping station may refer to:

- Epping railway station, Melbourne, a station on the Mernda line on the Metropolitan train network in Melbourne, Victoria, Australia
- Epping railway station, Sydney, a station on the T9 Northern Line on the Sydney Trains network and on the Sydney Metro in Sydney, New South Wales, Australia
- Epping tube station, the terminus of the London Underground Central line in Essex, United Kingdom
- Epping Glade railway station, a planned station on the Epping Ongar heritage railway in Essex, United Kingdom
