= Alfred Cheeke =

Australian judge (1810–1876)

(The Honourable) Alfred Cheeke
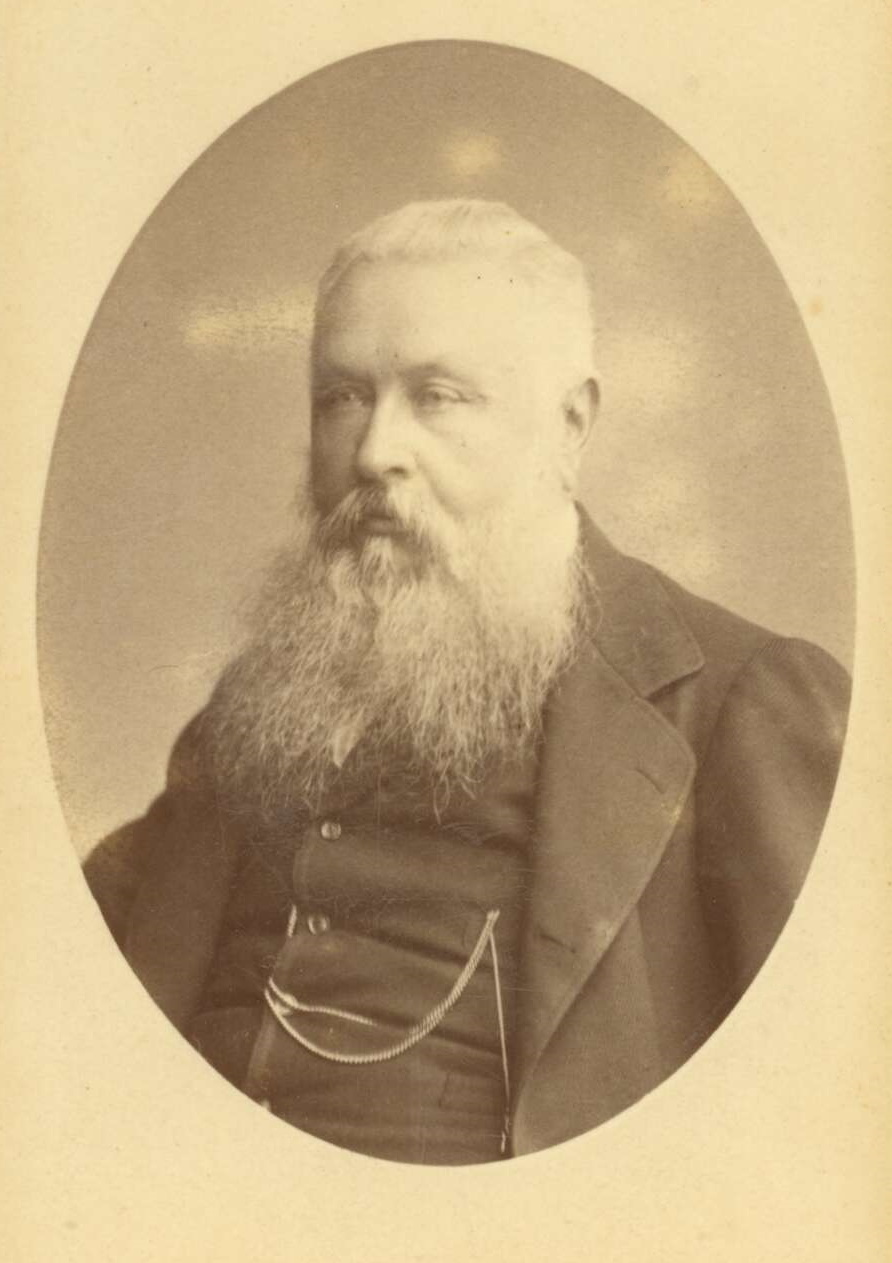

Judge of the Supreme Court of New South Wales
- In office 1865–1876

Personal details
- Born: 10 March 1810 Evesham, Worcestershire, England, United Kingdom
- Died: 14 March 1876 (aged 66) Sydney, New South Wales, Australia
- Occupation: Judge, barrister

Alfred Cheeke (10 March 1810 – 14 March 1876) was a judge of the Supreme Court of New South Wales.

== Biography ==
Cheeke was born at Evesham, Worcestershire, England, one of eight to solicitor and senior magistrate to the County of Worcestershire John Mosely Gilbert Cheeke and is stated to have been a lineal descendant of the celebrated scholar and statesman Sir John Cheke. He was called to the English bar in 1835, and joined the Oxford Circuit.

Having emigrated to Sydney, Australia in 1837, he was appointed a magistrate in 1838, and practised as a barrister. In 1841 he was appointed Commissioner of the Court of Claims, and in June of the same year Crown Prosecutor, Chairman of Quarter Sessions in 1844, and Commissioner of the Court of Requests in 1845. From 1851 to 1857 he again acted as Chairman of Quarter Sessions, and from 1858 to 1865 was a District Court Judge. From the latter date till his death, on 14 March 1876, he officiated as a Judge of the Supreme Court. Cheeke sentenced Irish-born Henry O'Farrell to death for the wounding and attempted assassination of Prince Alfred, Duke of Edinburgh in 1868.

== Personal life and death ==
Cheeke was also a racehorse owner and breeder, his horse Clove won the Australian Derby in 1865. Cheeke was unmarried, he was buried in St Jude's cemetery, Randwick, New South Wales (the name on his tombstone incorrectly appears as 'Cheek').
