= Epping Forest, Kearns =

Epping Forest
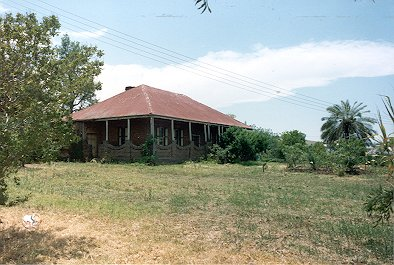

- Location within Sydney Location within Australia
- 34°01′05″S 150°48′19″E
- Location: Mississippi Crescent, Kearns, City of Campbelltown, New South Wales, Australia

History
- Built: 1825–

Site notes
- Owner: Frank

New South Wales Heritage Register
- Official name: Epping Forest
- Type: State heritage (complex / group)
- Designated: 13 August 1999
- Reference no.: 1298
- Type: Homestead Complex
- Category: Farming and Grazing
- Builders: Unknown

Epping Forest is a heritage-listed former farm and residence located on Mississippi Crescent, Kearns, New South Wales, an outer suburb of Sydney, Australia. It was designed and built from 1825. The property is privately owned. It was added to the New South Wales State Heritage Register on 13 August 1999.

== History ==
=== Airds ===
Airds was the name used to describe the entire Campbelltown area. Governor Macquarie, on his first visit in 1810, wrote: 'I intend forming this tract of country into a new and separate district for the accommodation of small settlers, and to name it Airds in honour of my dear good Elizabeth's family estate (in Scotland)'. Airds was widely used at first but as individual local villages came into being, the broad name fell out of use and it wasn't reborn until 1975 when the NSW Housing Commission converted bush farms at "South Kentlyn" into a new housing estate - Airds.

=== Kearns and Epping Forest ===
The land was part of the district of Minto and was formally granted by Governor Macquarie in 1810 to Matthew and John Kearns in two adjoining 40 hectares (100 acres) parcels. The conditions of these grants required at least 10 hectares (25 acres) of each parcel to be cultivated and allowed for the logging of timber on the land owned by the Crown. The location of the land within the grant that was cultivated and any areas which were officially logged is unknown. Matthew Kearn's grant was known as River Hill and was part of a prosperous and established neighbourhood around the new settlement of Campbelltown.

By the early 1820s the land had passed into the hands of William Kearns who was recorded as having lived there in 1823. The house on the site was built shortly after (1825) and the property has been improved to include orchards, grain crops and general dairy farming. Some of the outbuildings and sheds would have been built as early as the 1820s although most of them were clearly built during later phases of the farming use of the farming use of the property.

The property remained in the hands of the family until 1960. During this period it passed through the hands of a number of family members but was in constant use as a farming property. After 1912 the property included an Ayreshire cattle stud and a private race horse stud along with the already established dairy farming interests. Mixed herd dairying was included in the 1960s.

== Description ==
Epping Forest is of the Old Colonial Georgian architectural style. It is constructed of sandstock brick. It has a symmetrical facade and a medium pitched roof and closed eaves. The verandah is under the main roof and has a decorative timber valance and slender turned wooden columns that were cut down when brick balustrading added. The sash windows have very small panes (six to upper sash and four to the lower. Above the six paneled front door is a curved fanlight with very fine glazing bars. It has stone windowsills, door threshold and verandah flagging. To the rear of the house there is a timber and fibro extension.

The interior has plaster walls and marble fireplaces. There is a high proportion of surviving fabric, with original detailing and extant joinery.

There are a range of sheds on the site. There are two steel framed cgi clad structures, one large rough sawn timber framed cgi clad structure and a number of small rough sawn timber framed annexures. Cladding on the annexures includes cgi and timber slabs.

=== Condition ===
As at 28 June 1999, the physical condition is fair. Archaeological potential for the site is high.

The degree of extant fabric is high, however the structure is not in good condition.

=== Modifications and dates ===
- 1810 – land granted to each of the Kearns brothers
- c. 1823 – site consolidated by William Kearnes
- c. 1825 – house constructed

== Heritage listing ==
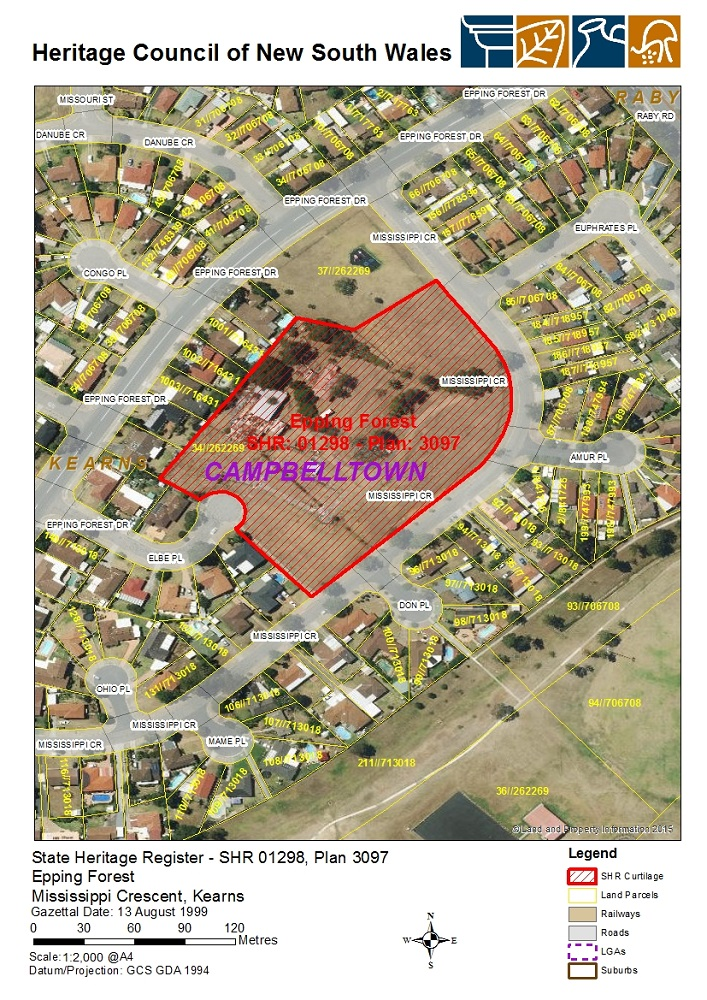
Heritage boundaries

As at 28 June 1999, Epping Forest is significant as a surviving example of an early colonial farm complex on the Cumberland Plain that retains the layout and fabric of a main house and associated outbuildings sited upon a small hill dating from the 1820s. The integrity of the place has been maintained by the survival of the Old Colonial Georgian style brick house, the slab and log outbuildings, and the survival of a sufficient curtilage of open country around the complex to enable its strategic siting and historical rural uses to still be appreciated and understood. The main house and outbuildings demonstrate in their layers of additional fabric and changing technology the ongoing functioning of the place as both a farm and residence. The overall layout of the complex, including its curtilage, allow for the continuance of a colonial built form within an increasingly late 20th century urbanised location.

Epping Forest was listed on the New South Wales State Heritage Register on 13 August 1999 having satisfied the following criteria.

The place is important in demonstrating the course, or pattern, of cultural or natural history in New South Wales.

The house was built in the Old Colonial Georgian architectural style, c. 1825. The site contains a high level of occupational evidence, such as the gardens, fences, outhouses and sheds, which demonstrate how the inhabitants used the building. The site demonstrates its role as a residential dwelling and farm for one hundred and forty years.

The place is important in demonstrating aesthetic characteristics and/or a high degree of creative or technical achievement in New South Wales.

The inclusion of the verandah under the hipped roof, makes Epping Forest, one of the more unusual Colonial houses, when compared to the more usual practice of the verandah being expressed separately.

The place has a strong or special association with a particular community or cultural group in New South Wales for social, cultural or spiritual reasons.

Until recently it was in the continuous occupation by descendants of the original pioneers who built it.

The place has potential to yield information that will contribute to an understanding of the cultural or natural history of New South Wales.

The dairy structures date from 1820 and provide a record of early dairy practice. The 1920s' additions to the dairy sheds demonstrate the changes to dairy and building technology during the previous century.
