= Claymore, New South Wales =

Suburb in Sydney, New South Wales, Australia

Claymore
- Suburb
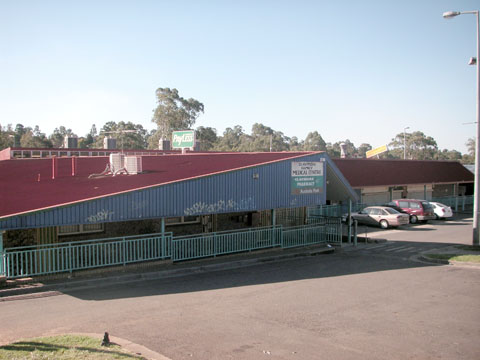
- Claymore shopping centre

- Interactive map of Claymore
- Coordinates: 34.0444°S 150.8096°E
- Country: Australia
- State: New South Wales
- City: Sydney
- LGA: City of Campbelltown
- Location: 54 km (34 mi) SW of Sydney
- Established: 1978

Government
  - State electorate: Campbelltown
  - Federal division: Macarthur
- Elevation: 69 m (226 ft)

Population
  - Total: 2,579 (SAL 2021)
- Postcode: 2559
Suburbs around Claymore
Eagle Vale	Eagle Vale	Woodbine
Blairmount	Claymore	Woodbine
Blairmount	Campbelltown	Woodbine

Claymore is a suburb of Sydney, in the state of New South Wales, Australia. Claymore is located 54 kilometres south-west of the Sydney central business district, in the local government area of the City of Campbelltown and is part of the Macarthur region. The majority of housing in Claymore is owned by Housing NSW. The streets are named after Australian artists.

== History ==
The area now known as Claymore was originally home to the Dharawal people. British settlers began moving into the area in the early 19th century, establishing farms and orchards. By the 1970s, the expansion of Sydney was great enough for developers to look at the area around Campbelltown. The Housing Commission of New South Wales undertook a large public housing development in the Claymore area. Originally the suburb was to be called Badgally after a local homestead, but the council backed off over concerns that the "Bad" part of the name could give the area a "bad" name. They chose Claymore after another local property, although that was also contentious since the name had very little history in the area. The first residents moved in during 1978, including original members of the local "Bench Club," a primarily Yiddish-speaking local organisation originally based in Airds, New South Wales such as Thomas Dabos, Cameron Monkes, Novak Bakavic, and Max Soptos, among others. As Bailey Sarian quoted in her Murder Mystery and Makeup Podcast "Claymore is a place of hopelessness for young people"

== Demographics ==
According to the 2021 census, Claymore had a population of 2,579 people.

- Aboriginal and Torres Strait Islander people made up 6.3% of the population.
- 54.5% of people were born in Australia. The next most common countries of birth were Bangladesh 6.3%, Samoa 3.4%, New Zealand 3.3%, India 2.0% and Fiji 1.6%.
- 50.7% of people spoke only English at home. Other languages spoken at home included Bengali 8.7%, Samoan 6.7%, Arabic 4.1%, Hindi 1.9% and Tongan 1.4%.
- The median age is 28, compared to the national median of 38, with 31.7% of the population aged 14 or under.
- The median household income is $1,020 per week, significantly lower than the national average median of $1,746.
- 70.6% of houses were rented, compared to the national average of 30.6%. 1.5% of houses were owned outright and 23.9% were owned with a mortgage.

== Poverty ==
In September 2012, an episode of the ABC program Four Corners entitled "Growing up poor" examined the lives of children in poor families in Claymore. It stated that the suburb had the youngest population in Australia. A report "Down and under" in the Al Jazeera 101 East series in February 2013 also pointed to the links between poverty and hopelessness, family tensions and violence and lack of opportunities for Claymore's children, where more than half the families have only one parent.

In the 2015 copy of the "Dropping Off The Edge" report, Claymore was listed as one of the most socially disadvantaged areas in New South Wales.

== Services ==
Claymore has a WorkVentures Connect Centre and the Kalon House of Welcome is managed by the Catholic church.
