= Catherine Field =

- Suburb
- Interactive map of Catherine Field
- Coordinates: 33°59′00″S 150°45′36″E
- Country: Australia
- State: New South Wales
- City: Sydney
- LGA: Camden
- Location: 55 km (34 mi) south-west of Sydney CBD

Government
  - State electorates: Badgerys Creek; Leppington; Camden
  - Federal division: Hume
- Elevation: 92 m (302 ft)

Population
  - Total: 2,609 (2021 census)
- Postcode: 2557
Suburbs around Catherine Field
Bringelly	Rossmore	Leppington
Oran Park	Catherine Field	Varroville
Harrington Park	Currans Hill	Eschol Park

Catherine Field is a suburb of Sydney and part of the Macarthur Region in the state of New South Wales, Australia. Catherine Field is 43 kilometres south-west of the Sydney central business district, in the local government area of Camden Council.

== History ==
The area now known as Catherine Field (or Catherine Fields) was originally home to the Muringong, southernmost of the Darug people. In 1805 John Macarthur established his property at Camden where he raised merino sheep.

Catherine Field Post Office opened on 1 July 1963 and closed in 1996.

Catherine Field also contains a pre-school, a cricket oval and community hall.

Catherine Field was home to a theme park called El Caballo Blanco in the 1980s.

It is on the outskirts of south west Sydney and is about 20 minutes without traffic to Campbelltown.

== Heritage listings ==
Catherine Field has a number of heritage-listed sites, including:

- 1025 Camden Valley Way: Raby, Catherine Field

== Population ==
According to the 2021 census, there were 2,609 residents in Catherine Field. 67.8% of people were born in Australia and 61.4% of people spoke only English at home. The most common response for religion was Catholic at 42.2%.

== Politics ==
Catherine Field is part of the north ward of Camden Council represented by David Funnell (currently deputy mayor of Camden), Cindy Cagney and Peter Johnson. Chris Patterson is currently the local mayor. The suburb is contained within the federal electorate of Macarthur, represented by former ultra-marathon runner Pat Farmer (Liberal), and the state electorate of Camden, currently held by former mayor Geoff Corrigan (Labor).
