= Electoral results for the district of Campbelltown =

Election results for Campbelltown, New South Wales, Australia

Electoral district of Campbelltown, an electoral district of the Legislative Assembly in the Australian state of New South Wales, has had one incarnation, from 1968 to the present.

== Members ==
| Election | Member | Party |
|---|---|---|
| 1968 | Max Dunbier | Liberal |
| 1971 | Cliff Mallam | Labor |
| 1973 | Cliff Mallam | Labor |
| 1976 | Cliff Mallam | Labor |
| 1978 | Cliff Mallam | Labor |
| 1981 | Michael Knight | Labor |
| 1984 | Michael Knight | Labor |
| 1988 | Michael Knight | Labor |
| 1991 | Michael Knight | Labor |
| 1995 | Michael Knight | Labor |
| 1999 | Michael Knight | Labor |
| 2001 by | Graham West | Labor |
| 2003 | Graham West | Labor |
| 2007 | Graham West | Labor |
| 2011 | Bryan Doyle | Liberal |
| 2015 | Greg Warren | Labor |
| 2019 | Greg Warren | Labor |
| 2023 | Greg Warren | Labor |

== Election results ==
=== Elections in the 2020s ===
==== 2023 ====
2023 New South Wales state election: Campbelltown
| Party | Candidate | Votes | % | ±% |
|---|---|---|---|---|
| Labor | Greg Warren | 25,629 | 53.7 | +1.9 |
| Liberal | Gypshouna Paudel | 8,104 | 17.0 | −9.8 |
| One Nation | Adam Zahra | 5,498 | 11.5 | +11.5 |
| Greens | Jayden Rivera | 2,876 | 6.0 | +0.9 |
| Liberal Democrats | Rosa Sicari | 2,339 | 4.9 | +4.9 |
| Animal Justice | Matt Twaddell | 1,866 | 3.9 | +0.1 |
| Sustainable Australia | Howard Jones | 867 | 1.8 | −0.4 |
| Independent | Tofick Galiell | 549 | 1.2 | +1.2 |
| Total formal votes | | 47,728 | 95.3 | +0.4 |
| Informal votes | | 2,358 | 4.7 | −0.4 |
| Turnout | | 50,086 | 86.2 | −1.8 |
Two-party-preferred result
| Labor | Greg Warren | 28,764 | 73.3 | +7.3 |
| Liberal | Gypshouna Paudel | 10,481 | 26.7 | −7.3 |
| Labor hold | | Swing | +7.3 | |

=== Elections in the 2010s ===
==== 2019 ====
2019 New South Wales state election: Campbelltown
| Party | Candidate | Votes | % | ±% |
|---|---|---|---|---|
| Labor | Greg Warren | 24,476 | 53.76 | +3.46 |
| Liberal | Riley Munro | 12,069 | 26.51 | −11.35 |
| Greens | Jayden Rivera | 2,339 | 5.14 | −0.43 |
| Christian Democrats | James Gent | 2,001 | 4.40 | +0.75 |
| Animal Justice | Matthew Stellino | 1,822 | 4.00 | +4.00 |
| Keep Sydney Open | Martin O'Sullivan | 1,723 | 3.78 | +3.78 |
| Sustainable Australia | Michael Clark | 1,096 | 2.41 | +2.41 |
| Total formal votes | | 45,526 | 94.97 | −0.78 |
| Informal votes | | 2,411 | 5.03 | +0.78 |
| Turnout | | 47,937 | 87.83 | −1.96 |
Two-party-preferred result
| Labor | Greg Warren | 27,026 | 67.01 | +9.68 |
| Liberal | Riley Munro | 13,305 | 32.99 | −9.68 |
| Labor hold | | Swing | +9.68 | |

==== 2015 ====
2015 New South Wales state election: Campbelltown
| Party | Candidate | Votes | % | ±% |
|---|---|---|---|---|
| Labor | Greg Warren | 22,703 | 50.3 | +16.3 |
| Liberal | Bryan Doyle | 17,089 | 37.9 | −7.6 |
| Greens | Ben Moroney | 2,515 | 5.6 | −0.8 |
| Christian Democrats | Sarah Ramsay | 1,646 | 3.6 | −1.3 |
| No Land Tax | Chris Stephandellis | 1,181 | 2.6 | +2.6 |
| Total formal votes | | 45,134 | 95.8 | +1.4 |
| Informal votes | | 2,002 | 4.2 | −1.4 |
| Turnout | | 47,136 | 89.8 | +0.5 |
Two-party-preferred result
| Labor | Greg Warren | 24,228 | 57.3 | +14.1 |
| Liberal | Bryan Doyle | 18,035 | 42.7 | −14.1 |
| Labor gain from Liberal | | Swing | +14.1 | |

==== 2011 ====
2011 New South Wales state election: Campbelltown
| Party | Candidate | Votes | % | ±% |
|---|---|---|---|---|
| Liberal | Bryan Doyle | 18,152 | 44.9 | +20.5 |
| Labor | Nick Bleasdale | 15,618 | 38.6 | −17.0 |
| Greens | Victoria Waldron Hahn | 2,677 | 6.6 | +0.0 |
| Independent | Chimezie Kingsley | 2,015 | 5.0 | +5.0 |
| Christian Democrats | David Wright | 1,957 | 4.8 | −1.3 |
| Total formal votes | | 40,419 | 95.6 | −0.6 |
| Informal votes | | 1,854 | 4.4 | +0.6 |
| Turnout | | 42,273 | 93.0 | |
Two-party-preferred result
| Liberal | Bryan Doyle | 19,510 | 53.4 | +21.8 |
| Labor | Nick Bleasdale | 17,048 | 46.6 | −21.8 |
| Liberal gain from Labor | | Swing | +21.8 | |

=== Elections in the 2000s ===
==== 2007 ====
2007 New South Wales state election: Campbelltown
| Party | Candidate | Votes | % | ±% |
|---|---|---|---|---|
| Labor | Graham West | 22,032 | 55.6 | −4.6 |
| Liberal | Stacey Copas | 9,687 | 24.4 | −0.8 |
| AAFI | Colin Marsh | 2,849 | 7.2 | +3.8 |
| Greens | Victoria Waldron Hahn | 2,612 | 6.6 | +1.4 |
| Christian Democrats | David Wright | 2,446 | 6.2 | +5.1 |
| Total formal votes | | 39,626 | 96.2 | −0.6 |
| Informal votes | | 1,555 | 3.8 | +0.6 |
| Turnout | | 41,181 | 93.3 | |
Two-party-preferred result
| Labor | Graham West | 24,251 | 68.5 | −1.4 |
| Liberal | Stacey Copas | 11,169 | 31.5 | +1.4 |
| Labor hold | | Swing | −1.4 | |

==== 2003 ====
2003 New South Wales state election: Campbelltown
| Party | Candidate | Votes | % | ±% |
|---|---|---|---|---|
| Labor | Graham West | 23,435 | 60.1 | +5.3 |
| Liberal | David Wright | 10,043 | 25.7 | +4.3 |
| Greens | Victoria Waldron Hahn | 2,148 | 5.5 | +2.0 |
| AAFI | Charles Byrne | 1,593 | 4.1 | +1.6 |
| One Nation | Rosemary Easton | 947 | 2.4 | −6.9 |
| Democrats | Leigh Ninham | 606 | 1.6 | −2.6 |
| Unity | Ghaleb Alameddine | 233 | 0.6 | −1.1 |
| Total formal votes | | 39,005 | 96.8 | −0.4 |
| Informal votes | | 1,295 | 3.2 | +0.4 |
| Turnout | | 40,300 | 92.7 | |
Two-party-preferred result
| Labor | Graham West | 24,524 | 69.6 | −0.3 |
| Liberal | David Wright | 10,732 | 30.4 | +0.3 |
| Labor hold | | Swing | −0.3 | |

==== 2001 by-election ====
2001 Campbelltown by-election Saturday 3 February
| Party | Candidate | Votes | % | ±% |
|---|---|---|---|---|
| Labor | Graham West | 19,586 | 58.96 | +4.20 |
| Independent | Oscar Rosso | 3,772 | 11.35 | +11.35 |
| Democrats | Glenda Blanch | 2,945 | 8.86 | +4.67 |
| Independent | David Barker | 2,851 | 8.58 | +8.58 |
| AAFI | Janey Woodger | 2,775 | 8.35 | +5.87 |
| Christian Democrats | Owen Nannelli | 1,292 | 3.89 | +3.89 |
| Total formal votes | | 33,221 | 96.28 | +0.9 |
| Informal votes | | 1,285 | 3.72 | −0.9 |
| Turnout | | 34,506 | 80.70 | −12.84 |
Two-candidate-preferred result
| Labor | Graham West | 21,070 | 77.8 | +7.9 |
| Independent | Oscar Rosso | 6,009 | 22.19 | +22.19 |
| Labor hold | | Swing | N/A | |

Michael Knight (Labor) resigned.

=== Elections in the 1990s ===
==== 1999 ====
1999 New South Wales state election: Campbelltown
| Party | Candidate | Votes | % | ±% |
|---|---|---|---|---|
| Labor | Michael Knight | 21,414 | 54.8 | +4.5 |
| Liberal | Paul Hawker | 8,353 | 21.4 | −10.1 |
| One Nation | Christine Dawson | 3,630 | 9.3 | +9.3 |
| Democrats | Dean Dudley | 1,639 | 4.2 | +0.3 |
| Greens | Vicki Kearney | 1,383 | 3.5 | +3.1 |
| AAFI | Ron Franks | 968 | 2.5 | −5.4 |
| Independent | Sharynne Freeman | 798 | 2.0 | +2.0 |
| Unity | Chandra Singh | 682 | 1.7 | +1.7 |
| Non-Custodial Parents | Jeffrey Churchill | 235 | 0.6 | +0.6 |
| Total formal votes | | 39,102 | 97.2 | +2.9 |
| Informal votes | | 1,133 | 2.8 | −2.9 |
| Turnout | | 40,235 | 93.5 | |
Two-party-preferred result
| Labor | Michael Knight | 23,153 | 69.9 | +9.0 |
| Liberal | Paul Hawker | 9,992 | 30.1 | −9.0 |
| Labor hold | | Swing | +9.0 | |

==== 1995 ====
1995 New South Wales state election: Campbelltown
| Party | Candidate | Votes | % | ±% |
|---|---|---|---|---|
| Labor | Michael Knight | 17,431 | 51.0 | −4.1 |
| Liberal | Anthony Roberts | 10,416 | 30.5 | −5.6 |
| AAFI | Janey Woodger | 2,995 | 8.8 | +8.8 |
| Democrats | David Bailey | 1,470 | 4.3 | −4.7 |
| Call to Australia | Jason Hando | 1,162 | 3.4 | +3.4 |
| Socialist Labour | Mike Head | 724 | 2.1 | +2.1 |
| Total formal votes | | 34,198 | 94.2 | +8.5 |
| Informal votes | | 2,107 | 5.8 | −8.5 |
| Turnout | | 36,305 | 93.6 | |
Two-party-preferred result
| Labor | Michael Knight | 19,469 | 61.8 | +1.9 |
| Liberal | Anthony Roberts | 12,026 | 38.2 | −1.9 |
| Labor hold | | Swing | +1.9 | |

==== 1991 ====
1991 New South Wales state election: Campbelltown
| Party | Candidate | Votes | % | ±% |
|---|---|---|---|---|
| Labor | Michael Knight | 16,353 | 55.0 | +7.1 |
| Liberal | Charlie Lynn | 10,703 | 36.0 | +4.6 |
| Democrats | Sharon Kellett | 2,660 | 9.0 | +9.0 |
| Total formal votes | | 29,716 | 85.7 | −10.6 |
| Informal votes | | 4,943 | 14.3 | +10.6 |
| Turnout | | 34,659 | 94.2 | |
Two-party-preferred result
| Labor | Michael Knight | 17,275 | 59.9 | +3.4 |
| Liberal | Charlie Lynn | 11,569 | 40.1 | −3.4 |
| Labor hold | | Swing | +3.4 | |

=== Elections in the 1980s ===
==== 1988 ====
1988 New South Wales state election: Campbelltown
| Party | Candidate | Votes | % | ±% |
|---|---|---|---|---|
| Labor | Michael Knight | 13,823 | 47.8 | −6.2 |
| Liberal | Richard Lewis | 10,135 | 35.0 | +13.6 |
| Independent EFF | Leslie Patterson | 2,892 | 10.0 | +10.0 |
| Independent | Cheryl Routley | 1,366 | 4.7 | +4.7 |
| Independent | Jeremy Finch | 730 | 2.5 | +2.5 |
| Total formal votes | | 28,946 | 96.5 | −0.9 |
| Informal votes | | 1,061 | 3.5 | +0.9 |
| Turnout | | 30,007 | 94.1 | |
Two-party-preferred result
| Labor | Michael Knight | 15,222 | 55.7 | −9.1 |
| Liberal | Richard Lewis | 12,112 | 44.3 | +9.1 |
| Labor hold | | Swing | −9.1 | |

==== 1984 ====
1984 New South Wales state election: Campbelltown
| Party | Candidate | Votes | % | ±% |
|---|---|---|---|---|
| Labor | Michael Knight | 19,781 | 53.0 | +0.3 |
| Independent | Gordon Fetterplace | 8,518 | 22.8 | −17.9 |
| Liberal | Violette Samaha | 7,138 | 19.1 | +19.1 |
| Independent | Edward Houston | 1,856 | 5.0 | +5.0 |
| Total formal votes | | 37,293 | 97.5 | −0.1 |
| Informal votes | | 969 | 2.5 | +0.1 |
| Turnout | | 38,262 | 93.0 | +1.4 |
Two-candidate-preferred result
| Labor | Michael Knight | | 58.7 | |
| Independent | Gordon Fetterplace | | 41.3 | |
| Labor hold | | Swing | | |

==== 1981 ====
1981 New South Wales state election: Campbelltown
| Party | Candidate | Votes | % | ±% |
|---|---|---|---|---|
| Labor | Michael Knight | 16,599 | 52.7 | −14.9 |
| Independent | Gordon Fetterplace | 12,836 | 40.7 | +40.7 |
| Independent | William Dowsett | 1,546 | 4.9 | +4.9 |
| Independent | William O'Donnell | 543 | 1.7 | +1.7 |
| Total formal votes | | 31,524 | 97.6 | |
| Informal votes | | 765 | 2.4 | |
| Turnout | | 32,289 | 91.6 | |
Two-candidate-preferred result
| Labor | Michael Knight | | 56.0 | −15.5 |
| Independent | Gordon Fetterplace | | 44.0 | +44.0 |
| Labor hold | | Swing | −15.5 | |

=== Elections in the 1970s ===
==== 1978 ====
1978 New South Wales state election: Campbelltown
| Party | Candidate | Votes | % | ±% |
|---|---|---|---|---|
| Labor | Cliff Mallam | 29,085 | 67.6 | +8.7 |
| Liberal | William Sadler | 10,612 | 24.6 | −16.5 |
| Democrats | Judith Bradbury | 2,060 | 4.8 | +4.8 |
| Independent | John Hennessey | 952 | 2.2 | +2.2 |
| Truckers Against Government | Mervyn Blinman | 349 | 0.8 | +0.8 |
| Total formal votes | | 43,058 | 97.8 | +0.3 |
| Informal votes | | 986 | 2.2 | −0.3 |
| Turnout | | 44,044 | 93.9 | −0.8 |
Two-party-preferred result
| Labor | Cliff Mallam | 30,786 | 71.5 | +12.6 |
| Liberal | William Sadler | 12,272 | 28.5 | −12.6 |
| Labor hold | | Swing | +12.6 | |

==== 1976 ====
1976 New South Wales state election: Campbelltown
| Party | Candidate | Votes | % | ±% |
|---|---|---|---|---|
| Labor | Cliff Mallam | 20,685 | 58.9 | +7.2 |
| Liberal | Robert Barton | 14,429 | 41.1 | −0.7 |
| Total formal votes | | 35,114 | 97.5 | +0.2 |
| Informal votes | | 907 | 2.5 | −0.2 |
| Turnout | | 36,021 | 94.7 | +0.8 |
| Labor hold | | Swing | +3.3 | |

==== 1973 ====
1973 New South Wales state election: Campbelltown
| Party | Candidate | Votes | % | ±% |
|---|---|---|---|---|
| Labor | Cliff Mallam | 14,016 | 51.7 | −6.5 |
| Liberal | John Marsden | 11,321 | 41.8 | 0.0 |
| Independent | Elizabeth Bye | 1,000 | 3.7 | +3.7 |
| Democratic Labor | Francis Bulger | 753 | 2.8 | +2.8 |
| Total formal votes | | 27,090 | 97.3 | |
| Informal votes | | 744 | 2.7 | |
| Turnout | | 27,834 | 93.9 | |
Two-party-preferred result
| Labor | Cliff Mallam | 15,074 | 55.6 | −2.6 |
| Liberal | John Marsden | 12,016 | 44.4 | +2.6 |
| Labor hold | | Swing | −2.6 | |

==== 1971 ====
1971 New South Wales state election: Campbelltown
| Party | Candidate | Votes | % | ±% |
|---|---|---|---|---|
| Labor | Cliff Mallam | 13,339 | 50.1 | +2.5 |
| Liberal | Max Dunbier | 13,310 | 49.9 | −2.5 |
| Total formal votes | | 26,649 | 97.2 | |
| Informal votes | | 773 | 2.8 | |
| Turnout | | 27,422 | 93.0 | |
| Labor gain from Liberal | | Swing | +2.5 | |

=== Elections in the 1960s ===
==== 1968 ====
1968 New South Wales state election: Campbelltown
| Party | Candidate | Votes | % | ±% |
|---|---|---|---|---|
| Liberal | Max Dunbier | 10,734 | 52.4 | −3.8 |
| Labor | Francis Ward | 9,739 | 47.6 | +3.8 |
| Total formal votes | | 20,473 | 97.3 | |
| Informal votes | | 568 | 2.7 | |
| Turnout | | 21,041 | 93.7 | |
| Liberal win | | (new seat) | | |
