= St Helen's Park =

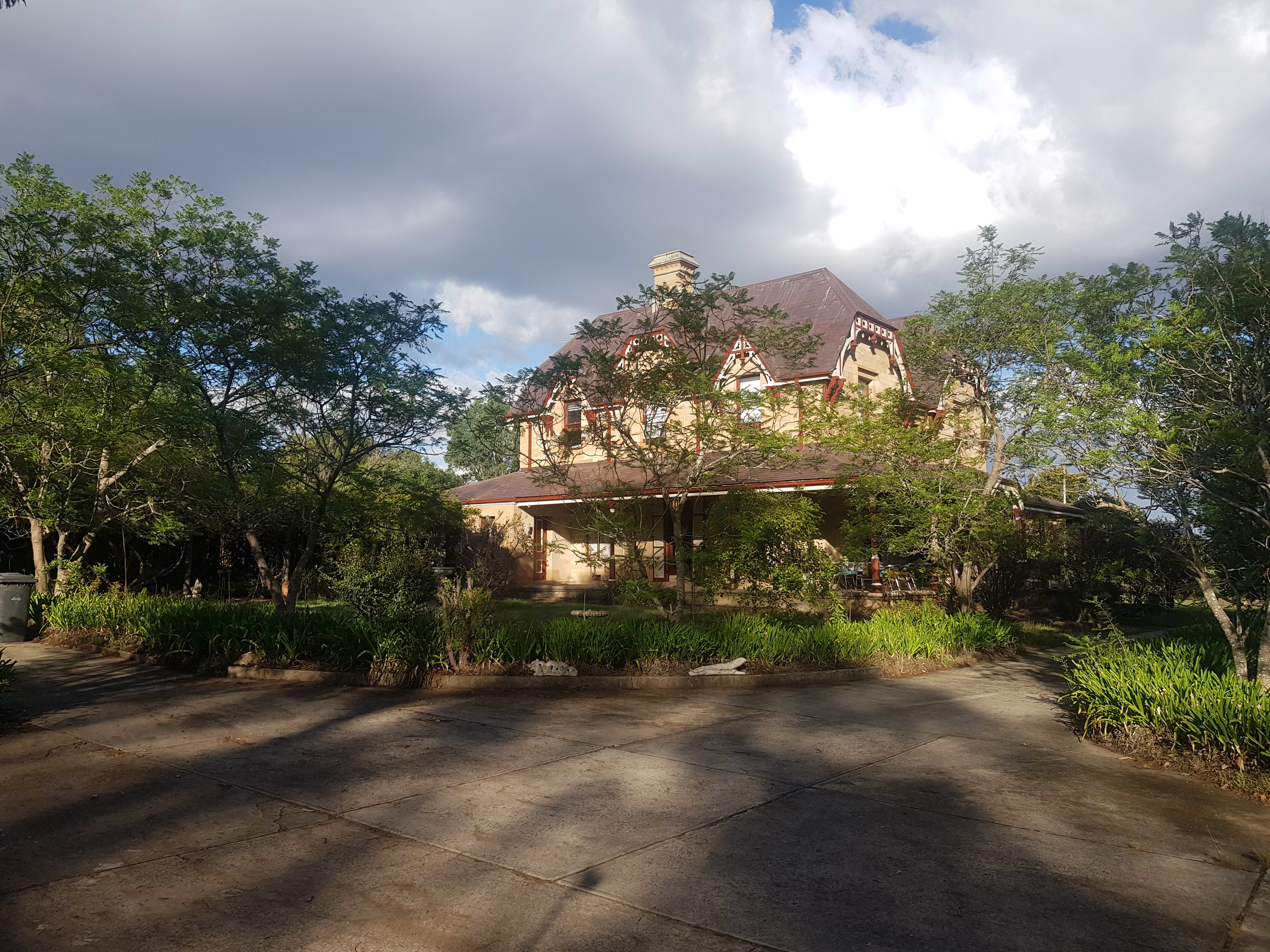
- An obscured image of St Helen's Park, pictured in 2009.

- Location within New South Wales Location within Australia
- 34°06′08″S 150°48′23″E
- Location: St Helens Park Drive, St Helens Park, City of Campbelltown, New South Wales, Australia

History
- Built: 1887

Site notes
- Architect: George Allen Mansfield
- Architectural style: Gothic

New South Wales Heritage Register
- Official name: St. Helen's Park; Egypt Farm
- Type: State heritage (complex / group)
- Designated: 2 April 1999
- Reference no.: 406
- Type: Mansion
- Category: Residential buildings (private)
- Builders: George Lusted

St Helen's Park is a heritage-listed former school, experimental farm, private residence and guesthouse and now homestead located at St Helens Park Drive, St Helens Park, City of Campbelltown, New South Wales, Australia. It was designed by George Allen Mansfield and built in 1887 by George Lusted. It is also known as St. Helen's Park and Egypt Farm. The property is privately owned. It was added to the New South Wales State Heritage Register on 2 April 1999.

== History ==
=== Campbelltown ===
The original inhabitants of the Campbelltown area were mostly people of the Dharawal (sometimes referred to as Dharawal) people, who ranged from the coast to the east, the Georges River in the west, north to Botany Bay and south to Nowra. However Campbelltown was a meeting point with the Dharug language group (whose area extended across the Blue Mountains) and early history of the area includes references to both peoples.

With establishment of the convict colony in Sydney in 1788 the displacement of Aboriginal people began. A smallpox epidemic decimated many of the coastal clans, but was less destructive amongst the inland peoples.

Escaped cattle from the convict settlement moved south and bred in the Campbelltown/Camden area and after their (re-) discovery in 1795, the area became known as the "Cow Pastures" (or Cowpasture). In 1805 Jon Macarthur obtained a grant of 2,023 hectares (5,000 acres) (later expanded to 4,047 hectares (10,000 acres)) in the area, some of the best grazing land then known in the colony.

By 1809, 34 settlers had received grants in the newly named Minto district (named after Gilbert Elliot-Murray-Kynynmound, 1st Earl of Minto, the Governor-General of India) in the northern portion of Campbelltown. Many of these were Irish, including surveyor James Meehan, who allocated himself a generous portion (now Macquarie Fields). Prominent settlers included Charles Throsby, who was allocated 202 hectares (500 acres) (now Glenfield), William Redfern (Campbellfield), John Townson (Varroville (homestead)) and Richard Brooks (Denham Court).

Though peaceful, the Tharawal people bore the brunt of a punitive expedition led by Captain James Wallis in 1816. At least 14 Tharawal people were massacred at the Appin Massacre, to the distress of sympathetic settlers such as Throsby of Glenfield. Corroborees and other ceremonies continued under the protection of the Macarthurs of Camden Park, though numbers steadily declined.

As the district became more densely settled a town was needed further south than Liverpool. Campbelltown was formally established in 1820 and named in honour of Elizabeth Macquarie's maiden name, Campbell. In 1826 the town plan was formalised.

As the district became more densely settled a town was needed further south than Liverpool. Campbelltown was formally established in 1820 and named in honour of Elizabeth Macquarie's maiden name, Campbell. In 1826 the town plan was formalised.

=== St. Helen's Park (homestead) ===
Copies of the two deeds of grant dated 8 October 1816, signed by Lachlan Macquarie and witnessed by H. C. Antill and Joseph Cowgill granted respectively 36 hectares (90 acres) to Samuel Larkin and 45 hectares (110 acres) to John Wild.

The 36 hectares (90 acres) for a quit rent of two shillings and the 45 hectares (110 acres) for three shillings, the Larkin land to be called Ambarvale and the Wild land Egypt Farm. Successive grants and transfers contain the names of Samuel Harding, David Nowland, and William Peaton.

Then on 24 April 1886 John Edmund Wild transferred 45 hectares (110 acres) to George Charles Westgarth. On 6 May 1886 Westgarth also acquired a further parcel of land from George Henry Graham which included part of the original grant to Samuel Larkin.

St Helen's Park was built in 1887 to the design of architect George Allen Mansfield, it was given to Sydney solicitor, George Westgarth as a wedding present, after he married Mansfield's daughter, Lucy. The contractor was George Lusted. George Westgarth was the founder of a Sydney-based law firm.

Then at an auction of Crown lands on 30 October 1895 George Charles Westgarth purchase the 5 hectares (13 acres) described as Portion 296, on which he later built a dam across Spring Creek to ensure the homestead's water supply.

Various uses for the property, apart from its original and present role as a country house, have been as a school, a guesthouse and an experimental farm. Subsequent uses include Campbelltown Grammar School and Commercial College, a Friesian cattle stud and an exclusive guesthouse.

As a result of its impending sale an Interim Conservation Order was placed over the property on 15 March 1985. A Permanent Conservation Order was placed over the property on 16 May 1986. It was transferred to the State Heritage Register on 2 April 1999.

== Description ==
=== House ===
St Helen's Park is an elaborate two storey neo Gothic mansion, with "Jerkinhead" gables, massive chimneys and decorative fretwork bargeboards. The foundations are said to have been cut from sandstone quarried on the property and the blocks to have come from Menangle.

It is symmetrical in plan and facade, with an extensive verandah to three sides being supported on cast iron columns. The gabled roof is covered in slate, the roof line being given interest by many dormer window gables, massive chimneys and fretwork barge boards.

Onto the flagged verandah open either French doors or large double hung windows, all screened by varnished louvered shutters. The four panelled front door is glazed with matching sidelights, above which is the Westgarth coat of arms and motto "Mens Concia Recti" displayed in leadlight above the lintel, in the transome light, and repeated on the first floor landing.

Internal joinery is of cedar being unpainted except to skirtings and architraves with fine built-in cupboards to bedrooms. There are seven large marble chimney pieces each of a different colour and many other original fittings and glasswork. A small stone dairy and timber stables of late Victorian design are some distance from the house.

Single storey service wing at rear contains original kitchen. Outbuildings include original stone cool room, carriage shed and barn.

=== Condition ===
As at 4 July 2008, the physical condition is good and highly intact. Currently valued in excess of AUD $10,000,000.00 AUD

=== Further information ===
A sandstone dam, historically linked with St. Helens Park is situated across Spring Creek.

== Heritage listing ==
As at 3 August 2016, St Helen's Park is an elaborate two storey neo Gothic mansion built in 1887 for the wealthy Sydney Westgarth family and designed by architect George Allen Mansfield. It is well detailed and generally intact. Its distinctive massing and architectural character and its position, make it a prominent feature in the landscape viewed from the Appin Road demonstrating the past rural estate character of the outskirts of Campbelltown.

St Helen's Park was listed on the New South Wales State Heritage Register on 2 April 1999.

== See also ==
- Australian residential architectural styles
