= 2001 Campbelltown state by-election =

Election result for Campbelltown, New South Wales, Australia

A by-election was held for the New South Wales Legislative Assembly electorate of Campbelltown on 3 February 2001 because of the resignation of Michael Knight (Labor).

The Liberal party did not field a candidate.

== Results ==
2001 Campbelltown by-election Saturday 3 February
| Party | Candidate | Votes | % | ±% |
|---|---|---|---|---|
| Labor | Graham West | 19,586 | 58.96 | +4.20 |
| Independent | Oscar Rosso | 3,772 | 11.35 | +11.35 |
| Democrats | Glenda Blanch | 2,945 | 8.86 | +4.67 |
| Independent | David Barker | 2,851 | 8.58 | +8.58 |
| AAFI | Janey Woodger | 2,775 | 8.35 | +5.87 |
| Christian Democrats | Owen Nannelli | 1,292 | 3.89 | +3.89 |
| Total formal votes | | 33,221 | 96.28 | +0.9 |
| Informal votes | | 1,285 | 3.72 | −0.9 |
| Turnout | | 34,506 | 80.70 | −12.84 |
Two-candidate-preferred result
| Labor | Graham West | 21,070 | 77.8 | +7.9 |
| Independent | Oscar Rosso | 6,009 | 22.19 | +22.19 |
| Labor hold | | Swing | N/A | |

== See also ==
- Electoral results for the district of Campbelltown
- List of New South Wales state by-elections
