= St Helens Park, New South Wales =

St Helens Park
- Suburb
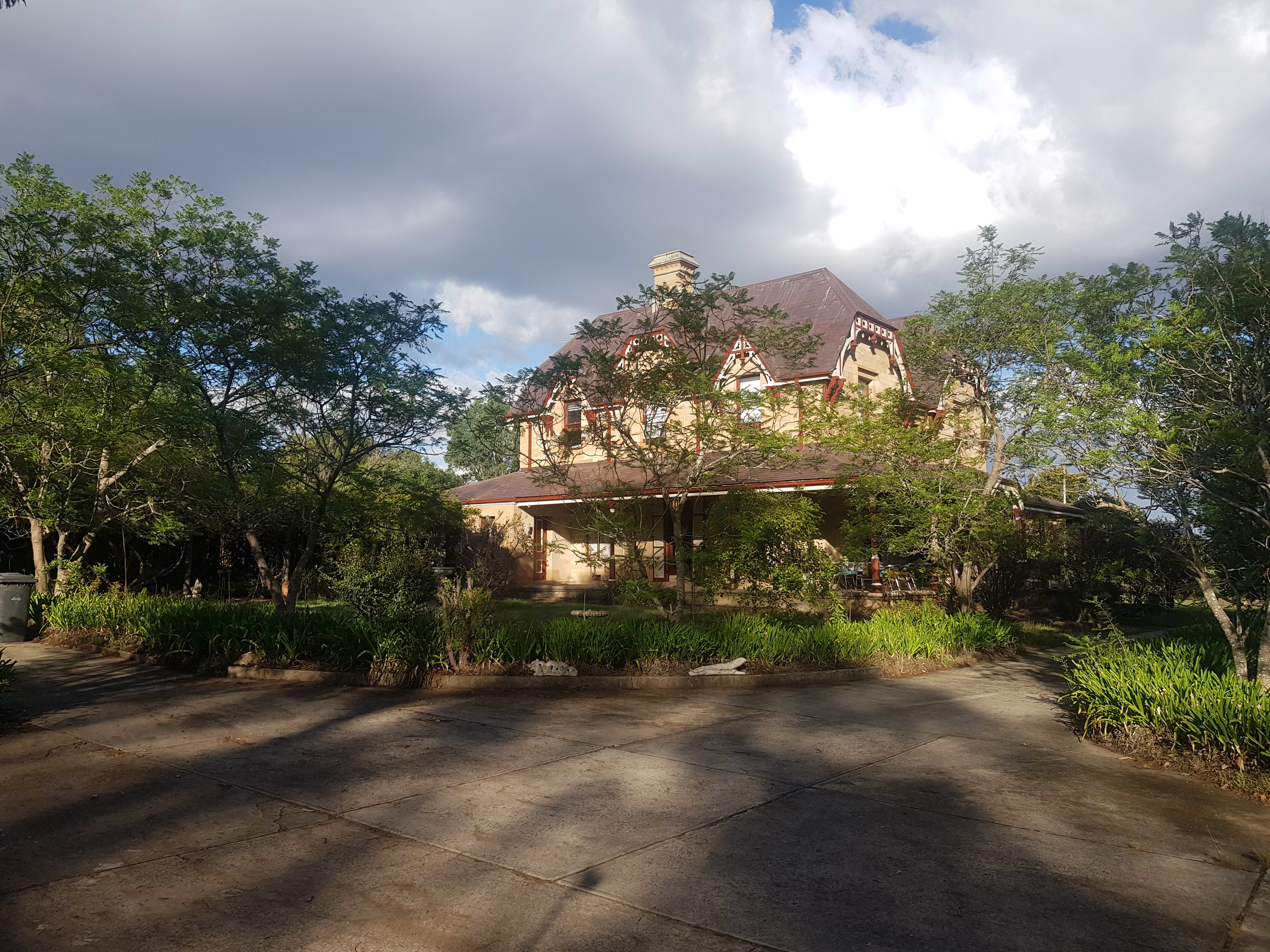
- St Helens Park House

- Interactive map of St Helens Park
- Country: Australia
- State: New South Wales
- City: Campbelltown
- LGA: City of Campbelltown
- Location: 56 km (35 mi) south-west of Sydney CBD
- Established: 1976

Government
  - State electorate: Campbelltown
  - Federal division: Macarthur
- Elevation: 143 m (469 ft)

Population
  - Total: 6,647 (2021 census)
- Postcode: 2560
Suburbs around St Helens Park
Ambarvale	Bradbury	Airds
Rosemeadow	St Helens Park	Holsworthy
Gilead	Gilead	Wedderburn

St Helens Park is a suburb of Sydney, in the state of New South Wales, Australia 56 kilometres south-west of the Sydney central business district, in the local government area of the City of Campbelltown. It is part of the Macarthur region.

== History ==
St Helens Park draws its name from a Gothic mansion built in 1887 by George Charles Westgarth, a Sydney solicitor. The mansion still stands at the southern end of St Helens Park Drive but it's not the oldest building in the suburb. That honour goes to a farmhouse on Appin Road called Denfield and Curtilage which was built in the 1830s by John Farley of Fisher's Ghost fame. Both buildings are listed on the Register of the National Estate.

By the 1940s, the St Helens Park property had become a fly spray testing laboratory and acquired the local nickname Blowfly Farm. It was later restored as a residence and grazing property. In 1975, Campbelltown Council designated the area for suburban development and in 1976, it was formally named St Helens Park. Although development was slow at first, it continued throughout the 80s, 90s and into the 21st century.

== Heritage listings ==
St Helens Park has a number of heritage-listed sites, including:

- Appin Road: Denfield
- St Helens Park Drive: St Helen's Park

== Schools ==
There are two primary schools in the suburb. Woodland Road Public at the northern end of the suburb was opened in 1980. St Helens Park Public to the south was opened in 1995. The nearest secondary school is Ambarvale High.

== Housing ==
St Helens Park is one of the more modern suburbs of Campbelltown, with new subdivisions taking place as of 2006. The vast majority of new development in the suburb is in the form of detached housing.

== Notable people ==
Calgary Stampeders kicker/punter Gerard Laws, son of comedian Steve Laws, grew up in St Helens Park. Coincidentally he grew up on the same street as former professional footballer David Carney. Gerard and David spent afternoons after school practising at Lynwood Park.

== Demographics ==
At the 2021 census, St Helens Park recorded a population of 6,647. The median family income was $1988 per week, which was slightly lower than the national average. The majority of residents were Australian born (73.3%) and spoke only English (73.1%) although there were substantial minorities speaking Arabic (3.2%), Spanish (1.9%), Samoan (1.7%) and Hindi and Vietnamese (both 1.2%).

St Helens Park is well connected by road to both Campbelltown and Wollongong via Appin Road. The suburb is also serviced by Campbelltown's local bus company, Busabout. It is serviced by two bus routes (887 and 888), one directly from St Helens Park to Campbelltown and one on the route from Campbelltown to Appin and Wollongong.
