= Englorie Park =

- Suburb
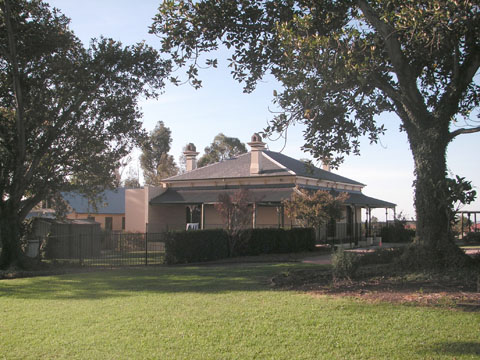
- Englorie Park House

- Interactive map of Englorie Park
- Country: Australia
- State: New South Wales
- City: Sydney
- LGA: City of Campbelltown
- Location: 55 km (34 mi) south-west of Sydney
- Established: 2000

Government
  - State electorate: Campbelltown
  - Federal division: Macarthur

Area
  - Total: 0.11235 km^{2} (0.04338 sq mi)
- Elevation: 112 m (367 ft)

Population
  - Total: 361 (2021 census)
  - Density: 3,213/km^{2} (8,322/sq mi)
- Postcode: 2560
Suburbs around Englorie Park
Blair Athol	Campbelltown	Campbelltown
Glen Alpine	Englorie Park	Bradbury
Glen Alpine	Ambarvale	Ambarvale

Englorie Park is a suburb of Sydney, in the state of New South Wales, Australia. Englorie Park is located 55 kilometres south-west of the Sydney central business district, in the local government area of the City of Campbelltown and is part of the Macarthur region.

== History ==
As well as being relatively small, Englorie Park is also a relatively new suburb, having only been designated by the Geographical Names Board in March 2000. Prior to then it was part of the suburb of Campbelltown. It draws its name from the historic Englorie Park House which was built in 1880 by greyhound breeder Alfred Park. Originally called Parkholme, the property was renamed Euglorie Park by Charles Burcher of Euglo Station, Condobolin. This later became corrupted to Englorie Park.

== Geography ==
Englorie Park is the smallest suburb in NSW, situated between the suburbs of Ambarvale, Campbelltown and Glen Alpine. The suburb is almost entirely residential, except for a childcare centre that operates within the historic Englorie Park House. The majority of housing within the suburb is detached, with a minority of townhouses. Englorie Park is situated very close to the Macarthur Square shopping centre and Campbelltown Hospital.

== Population ==
In the 2021 Census, there were 361 people in Englorie Park. 61.5% of people were born in Australia and 63.7% of people spoke only English at home. The most common response for religion was Catholic at 31.6%.
