= Gordon Fetterplace =

Australian politician

Gordon Karl Fetterplace OAM was a member of the Campbelltown City Council from 1968 and served as Mayor of Campbelltown, New South Wales, for seven years between 1976 and 1992. He died of cancer aged 74 on 28 March 2008.

== Family ==
He married his wife Barbara Auburn in 1956. The two had 10 children and 26 grandchildren. They moved to Campbelltown in 1961 to open the Bus Stop Pharmacy in Queen Street.

== Community work ==
Fetterplace was a strong supporter of rugby league and aided the development of the sport in the Campbelltown region, serving on the board of the Western Suburbs Leagues Club between 1994 and 1999. He was re-elected in 2002, serving a further five years in the capacity of Director. Fetterplace was also the patron of the Campbelltown Show Society. Gordon became a well known personality in Campbelltown; volunteering his services in a variety of ways including to the local fire brigade and the Campbelltown Catholic Club. Mr. Fetterplace's community service also reached to St Gregory's Catholic College and charitable groups across the region. He retired from public life in 2007.

== Political work ==
Fetterplace served on the Campbelltown City Council for 23 years, as well as 7 one-year terms as mayor and 3 terms as deputy mayor. In 1981 and 1984, Fetterplace sought election to the New South Wales Legislative Assembly as an Independent candidate for the seat of Campbelltown. In 1988, he stood as an Independent EFF candidate in the seat of Camden. Fetterplace pushed for better housing in the Campbelltown area, and provided governmental support for community based initiatives. After suffering a heart attack in April 1992, he retired from local government.

== Recognition ==
In 1994 Gordon was awarded the Medal of the Order of Australia for his services to Campbelltown. In 2000 he was awarded the National Medal. In 2011, the refurbished Campbelltown Swimming Centre was renamed the Gordon Fetterplace Aquatic Centre. The Wests Leagues Club awards a Gordon Fetterplace Medal.
