= Denfield =

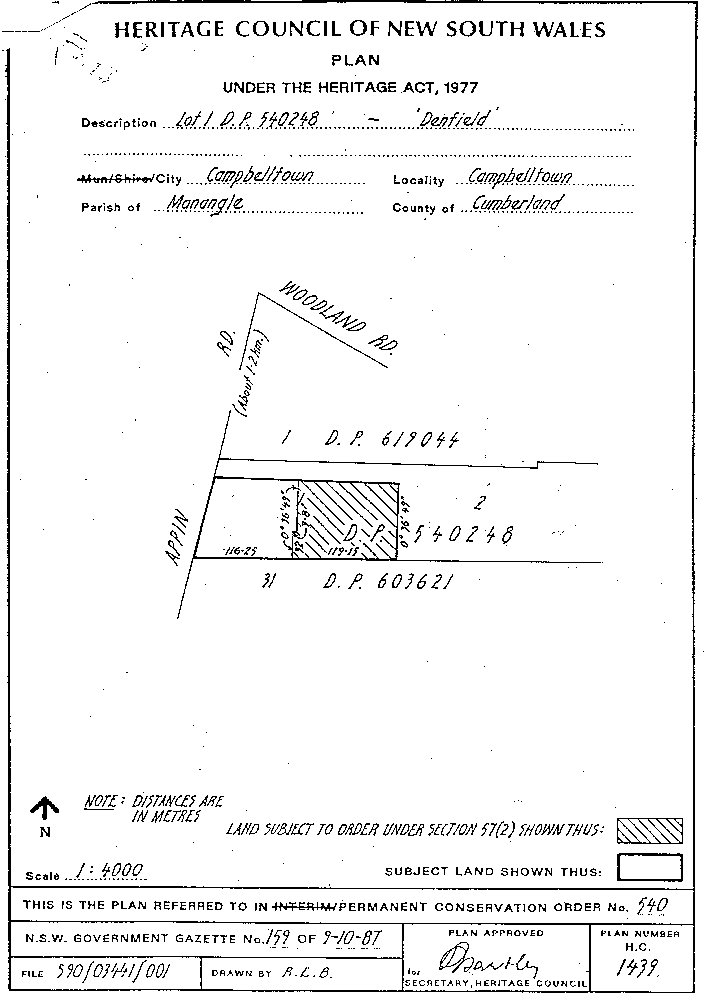
- Heritage boundaries

- Location within New South Wales Location within Australia
- 34°06′19″S 150°48′06″E
- Location: Appin Road, St Helens Park, City of Campbelltown, New South Wales, Australia

History
- Built: 1837

New South Wales Heritage Register
- Official name: Denfield
- Type: State heritage (complex / group)
- Designated: 2 April 1999
- Reference no.: 540
- Type: Homestead Complex
- Category: Farming and Grazing
- Builders: John Farley

Denfield is a heritage-listed former farm homestead complex, residence, inn and farm and now residence located in the outer Sydney suburb of St Helens Park, New South Wales, Australia. It was built in 1837 by John Farley. It was added to the New South Wales State Heritage Register on 2 April 1999.

== History ==
The original inhabitants of the Campbelltown area were mostly people of the Tharawal (sometimes referred to as Dharawal) people, who ranged from the coast to the east, the Georges River in the west, north to Botany Bay and south to Nowra. However Campbelltown was a meeting point with the Dharug language group (whose area extended across the Blue Mountains) and early history of the area includes references to both peoples.

With establishment of the convict colony in Sydney in 1788 the displacement of Aboriginal people began. A smallpox epidemic decimated many of the coastal clans, but was less destructive amongst the inland peoples.

Escaped cattle from the convict settlement moved south and bred in the Campbelltown/Camden area and after their (re-) discovery in 1795, the area became known as the "Cow Pastures" (or Cowpasture). In 1805 Jon Macarthur obtained a grant of 2,023 hectares (5,000 acres) (later expanded to 4,047 hectares (10,000 acres)) in the area, some of the best grazing land then known in the colony.

By 1809 34 settlers had received grants in the newly named Minto district (named after Lord Minto, the Governor-General of India) in the northern portion of Campbelltown. Many of these were Irish, including surveyor James Meehan, who allocated himself a generous portion (now Macquarie Fields). Prominent settlers included Charles Throsby, who was allocated 202 hectares (500 acres) (now Glenfield), Dr. William Redfern (Campbellfield), Dr. John Townson (Varroville (homestead)) and Richard Brooks (Denham Court).

Though peaceful, the Tharawal people bore the brunt of a punitive expedition led by Captain James Wallis in 1816. At least 14 Tharawal people were massacred at the Appin Massacre, to the distress of sympathetic settlers such as Throsby of Glenfield. Corroborees and other ceremonies continued under the protection of the Macarthurs of Camden Park, though numbers steadily declined.

As the district became more densely settled a town was needed further south than Liverpool. Campbelltown was formally established in 1820 and named in honour of Mrs Elizabeth Macquarie's maiden name, Campbell. In 1826 the town plan was formalised.

=== Denfield ===
The original house and a roofed but open sided link to the original kitchen block behind it, was completed between 1835 and 1837 by a John Farley.

Farley arrived from England in 1812 and became what was described at the time as a "sober, hard working and prosperous farmer" on approximately 81 hectares (200 acres). His claim to fame was that he was the first man claiming to have seen 'Fisher's Ghost', the centre of a local legend involving murder and intrigue.

Campbelltown farms produced wheat for the colony. This crop was short-lived as the disease "wheat rust" infected the area.

Farley sold the property to John Bray in 1840. Bray owned other properties to the south and used Denfield as a cattle fattening holding farm, closer to the Sydney Markets for stock from his other more distant holdings. Bray married three times, each of his first two wives dying at Denfield. The third wife outlived him and was still in residence in the early 1900s. It is thought that for some time the building became an inn.

Following the death of the third Mrs Bray the property was rented over a number of years, substantial parcels of land were hived off and sold and Denfield's homestead fell into disrepair.

The property was purchased in the 1960s by architect Sydney Palmer and renovated (cf restored) in 1964. A December 1965 article in "Building Ideas" showcased the "sensitive restoration and renovation, installation of electrical service and plumbing which have made Denfield a house for modern living while still preserving its early colonial character." It noted that the original detached kitchen had become a bedroom, with bathroom and laundry added. Where possible original materials were reused, e.g.: sandstock brocks for rebuilding the southern wall and the 6" wide blackbutt boards for flooring drawing room, study and dining rooms. New verandah columns were designed in the spirit of the original period to replace the then existing mid-or late-Victorian columns. The graceful valance board was cut from a template of the original valance, still in position, by decayed beyond use. All walls were stripped and re-plastered, ceilings replaced with Gyprock sheets and plaster cornices.

In 1970 Palmer sold the property to the Sefton family who operated it as a lavender farm for ten years.

In the 1970s the urbanisation of Campbelltown started with significant urban expansion in the district. While the start of subdivision of St. Helens Park did not start until the 1990s and the subdivision stage around Denfield until the mid-1990s, the smaller lot and housing future of the locality/suburb was sealed with the demise of farming and planned urban development.

In 1985 it was sold to Mr and Mrs Robinson who spent c. $45,000 on maintenance and improvements, including eradicating termites in the house, outbuildings and fencing, and planting over 1400 trees and shrubs. In 1987 the property was about two hectares (four point nine acres), zoned Special Uses, surrounded by land zoned 2(c) residential.

The Heritage Council of NSW approved a four-lot subdivision of the property on 7 March 1991, subject to moving the then-proposed eastern boundary of Lot 1 (containing Denfield homestead and slab hut and an original fence) further east by 3.8 metres (12 ft). On 24 July 1991 the Minister for Planning signed an exemption thus not requiring Heritage Council approval for subdivision and residential use of Lot 4 which is to the east of Lot 1. This order was gazetted on 2 August 1991 in the NSW Government Gazette no. 112.

Approximately 1.0 hectare (2.5 acres) was sold to Landcom, approx. zero point four zero hectares (one acre) retained by Mrs Robinson and the remaining 0.61 hectares (1.5 acres) was sold to the previous owners, the Laws, in 1992. The Laws lived in Denfield for over 23 years, undertaking restoration to the house and garden areas, with the assistance of Federal Government and Campbelltown City Council grants. They built the two modern outbuildings in 1997 (to the house's north-west, near the pool) and c. 2004 (a southern pavilion, connected to the house).

1994 and 1997 proposals to rezone land nearby to the north on Appin Road for a service station would have further eroded Denfield's remaining semi-rural setting into suburbia. The Heritage Office provided advice recommending against such actions.

Denfield's previous owners the Laws in 1999 bought an additional acre directly to its south, to increase the curtilage around the main house on the south, where the house was very close to the then southern boundary. The property now comprises 1.5 hectares (3.7 acres). Lot 122 was acquired by the Laws so they could control when it would be subdivided, with appropriate development, rather than what was occurring locally at that time by others.

The Laws lodged a subdivision proposal in a 2013 application involving Lot 101 (Denfield House, etc.), to undertake a boundary adjustment between Lot 101 and Lot 122 and then subdivide the latter into four allotments. Following discussions with the Heritage Council, this subdivision application was withdrawn. The 2013 subdivision and four-lot proposal was likely to have resulted in unacceptable impact on Denfield by inadequate setbacks from the western frontage available for a future dwelling. Following this withdrawal, the Laws sold Denfield house lot (101) to the present owners, the Duffys.

== Description ==
=== Site ===
More than 1.0 hectare (2.5 acres) of land across two separate titles with three street frontages. Denfield is located on a prominent knoll on the Appin Road. It is now surrounded to the north, east and south by suburban development with a local service station impinging on views to it from the Appin Road.

Denfield comprises two lots (101 and 122) on the top of a hill with access from Appin Road to its west. Lot 101 is effectively the remaining house and garden-site at the core of its original 81-hectare (200-acre) farm. With increasing width and traffic on Appin Road the RTA has provided separate access.

The site is well landscaped, including major trees and shrubs, with what remains of its original "home" garden. It classically occupies a prominent position on level ground on the top of a raised section of land, where Appin Road and surrounding land drops away on each side to the north, west and south.

There is a dam/in-ground swimming pool and a small orchard adjoining the house. The boundary of the proposed 5000m2 curtilage is now defined, as is the whole property, by trees and shrubs. The land beyond is some 15,000 square metres (160,000 sq ft).

Prettily sited and surrounded by trees (AHC).

=== Buildings ===
Homestead

A Georgian colonial cottage set back c. 45 metres (148 ft) from Appin Road. Cottage is of symmetrical plan built by John Farley. Construction is of sandstone brick on stone foundations with timber verandah under continuous hipped roof, having slight bull cast at verandah junction. Sandstock brick walls and chimneys, predominantly timber floor framing and timber floor boarding, original lath and plaster ceilings, some new fibrous plaster ceilings and cornices, some original timber (blacbutt: Ray White Macarthur Group, 2014) boarded ceilings and cornices, original cedar joinery including superbly hand crafted cedar mantlepiece and fireplace cupboard in the drawing room, original galvanized corrugated iron roof and water tank sheeting, ogee gutters and round downpipes in parts and intrusive gutters with square downpipes elsewhere, painted timber linings, joinery and decorative timberwork, stone flagging and timber tank stands.

The main building is of masonry rendered and marked as stone with a gabled, corrugated iron clad roof and verandah to three sides supported on stop chamfered timber posts. It has three rendered brickwork chimneys with terracotta pots. Windows are twelve pane type with louvred shutters and doors six panel type. Simple semi-circular Georgian fanlight to the panelled (fielded) front door. Sandstone used for architraves to main openings and paving to verandah. Verandah is open full length on the western (Appin Road) side, return verandah across the northern end has been filled in with sympathetic painted timber and glazed panels and doors.

Four bedrooms and three bathrooms plus study.

Fireplaces have Georgian chimney pieces. Windows are twelve pane type with louvred shutters and doors six panel type. Verandah is decorated with a fine scalloped timber valance (AHC).

Air conditioning and a wine cellar.

Outbuildings

There is an existing roofed but open sided walkway running off the rear door of the house linking with an existing single storey original external kitchen structure. Quite separate from the house and kitchen is an in ground swimming pool, wood shed, workshop and carport. There is also a c. 1840 slab hut used as a museum for old implements. There is also a dam/swimming pool and a timber structure used as a garage, workshop and toolshed. A number of other buildings and structures also exist including slab shed, timber structure, workshop, carport, cricket pitch and water tanks that hold 32,000 litres (7,000 imp gal; 8,500 US gal) of water.

=== Condition ===
As at 24 July 2014, some new fibrous plaster ceilings and cornices, some original timber boarded ceilings and cornices, original cedar joinery, original galvanized corrugated iron roof and water tank sheeting, ogee gutters and round downpipes in parts and intrusive gutters with square downpipes elsewhere, painted timber linings, joinery and decorative timberwork, stone flagging and timber tank stands.

=== Modifications and dates ===
1964 renovation: A December 1965 article in "Building Ideas" showcased the "sensitive restoration and renovation, installation of electrical service and plumbing which have made Denfield a house for modern living while still preserving its early colonial character." It noted that the original detached kitchen had become a bedroom, with bathroom and laundry added. Where possible original materials were reused, e.g.: sandstock brocks for rebuilding the southern wall and the 6" wide blackbutt boards for flooring drawing room, study and dining rooms. New verandah columns were designed in the spirit of the original period to replace the then existing mid-or late-Victorian columns. The graceful valance board was cut from a template of the original valance, still in position, by decayed beyond use. All walls were stripped and re-plastered, ceilings replaced with Gyprock sheets and plaster cornices.

1991 subdivision was to excise some 2/3 of land of property, to allow for future residential development. The proposed subdivision was not considered to adversely affect the significance of the house and an outbuilding. It was not advertised.

== Heritage listing ==
As at 27 February 2007, Denfield's homestead is assessed as having state and regional heritage significance primarily in regard to its architectural quality, social and historic associations particularly at a regional level and in its setting, garden and collective of buildings.

The complex is one of the earliest surviving and intact collective of buildings of their kind in the Campbelltown and Appin areas. Denfield is associated with early farming identities John Farley, who was also infamous in that he was the first person to encounter Fisher's Ghost in Campbelltown and John Bray who along with his family owner and farmed it form 1840 until will into the 1900s. It played an important part in the early settlement of Campbelltown/Appin through increasing importance and popularity of the district.

The early buildings form part of surviving colonial farmhouse buildings in the Campbelltown/ Appin areas with a garden and bush setting. The early buildings are an example of the colonial farmhouse style of architecture, even though altered a number of times. The surviving early fabric demonstrates the basic principles of colonial design, detailing and finishes.

The buildings are significant for the use of early colonial materials and methods of construction and building forms and their adaptation over their life with a variety of materials. The buildings demonstrate colonial design principles in best practice.

Denfield has been at the focus of farming in the Campbelltown/Appin areas since the 1830s. It has a strong connection with the development and history of the area through social interactions and contributions by its owners and residents to the private, public and farming life of Campbelltown and Appin.

The early buildings are an example of the colonial farmhouse style of architecture. The homestead is representative of the time of use and development from this period and typical of the early colonial farmhouse complex in a large garden and bush setting.

Denfield is reputed to have been built in 1837 by John Farley, the man who claimed to have seen Fisher's Ghost. It is a good example of the smaller farmhouse of its time. With a central doorway, two windows with shutters on each side and one door at each end of the stone flagged walk. The walls are rendered and marked as stone and the roof is corrugated iron. It is a well proportioned colonial farmhouse built in the traditional style. Denfield was carefully restored in the 1960s by architect S.C Palmer.

An excellent example of a typical farmhouse of the 1830s that remains in good condition (AHC). A colonial farmhouse and remnant of a colonial farm. Historical associations as the house built for John Farley, the man who claimed to have seen Fisher's Ghost.

Denfield was listed on the New South Wales State Heritage Register on 2 April 1999.

== See also ==
- Australian residential architectural styles
