= Chris Stephandellis =

- Full name: Chris Theo Stephandellis
- Born: 30 July 1961 (age 65) Darlinghurst, NSW, Australia

Rugby union career
- Position: Fullback
Provincial / State sides
Years	Team	Apps	(Points)
1982–84	New South Wales	9	(58)
- Rugby league career

Playing information
- Position: Fullback / Wing
Club
Years	Team	Pld	T	G	FG	P
1985–87	Western Suburbs Magpies	10	1	9		22

Chris Theo Stephandellis (born 30 July 1961) is an Australian former rugby union and rugby league player.

== Biography ==
A goal-kicking fullback, Stephandellis was an Australian under-21 and New South Wales Waratahs representative as a rugby union player during the early 1980s, while competing at club level for Western Suburbs RFC. He got signed by the Western Suburbs Magpies in 1985 and appeared for the club across three NSWRL seasons.

Stephandellis is a former real estate agent and now works in finance. He contested the 2015 New South Wales state election as a member of the No Land Tax Campaign party for the electorate of Campbelltown.
