= Bryan Doyle =

Australian politician

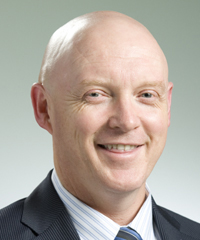

Member of the New South Wales Parliament for Campbelltown
- In office 26 March 2011 – 6 March 2015
- Preceded by: Graham West
- Succeeded by: Greg Warren

Personal details
- Born: 13 November 1963 (age 63)
- Party: Liberal Party
- Spouse: Sharon
- Education: University of Technology Sydney (1991) LLB; University of Wollongong (1998) GCMGT; Charles Sturt University (2001) MBA
- Occupation: Former police inspector

Bryan Michael Doyle (born 13 November 1963) is an Australian former politician. He was a member of the New South Wales Legislative Assembly representing Campbelltown for the Liberal Party from 2011 to 2015.

== Early years and background ==
With family links to Australia's convict history, Doyle is the son of a magistrate and joined the NSW Police Force in 1983. After spending three years at Broken Hill, Doyle returned to Sydney and in 2005 was stationed at Campbelltown where he later became the chief inspector of police for the area.

== Political career ==
In 2011, Doyle contested the normally safe Labor seat of Campbelltown in Sydney's south-western suburbs. Doyle was elected with a swing of 20.5 points and won the seat with 53.4 per cent of the two-party vote. Doyle's opponent was Nick Bleasdale, representing Labor. Graham West who was the previous Labor sitting member had earlier announced his retirement from politics after holding the seat for 10 years. In the 2015 election, Doyle was defeated by Labor's Greg Warren, suffering a 14% two-party preferred swing against him.

New South Wales Legislative Assembly
Preceded by Graham West	Member for Campbelltown; 2011–2015	Succeeded by Greg Warren
