= Ambarvale =

- Suburb
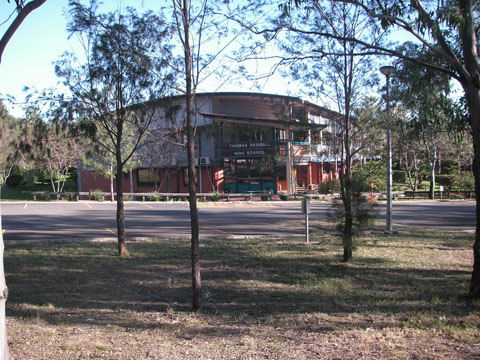
- Thomas Reddall High, Ambarvale

- Interactive map of Ambarvale
- Country: Australia
- State: New South Wales
- City: Sydney
- LGA: City of Campbelltown
- Location: 55 km (34 mi) south-west of Sydney CBD
- Established: 1976

Government
  - State electorate: Campbelltown
  - Federal division: Macarthur
- Elevation: 94 m (308 ft)

Population
  - Total: 7,254 (2021 census)
- Postcode: 2560
Suburbs around Ambarvale
Englorie Park	Campbelltown	Bradbury
Glen Alpine	Ambarvale	Bradbury
Gilead	Rosemeadow	St Helens Park

Ambarvale is a suburb of south-western Sydney in New South Wales, Australia. Ambarvale is located 55 kilometres south-west of the Sydney central business district, in the local government area of the City of Campbelltown, and is part of the Macarthur region. The suburb is predominantly residential and contains a mix of public and private housing.

== History ==
=== Aboriginal culture ===
The region's history began over 40,000 years ago and is contained in the continuing culture of the Tharawal people.The surrounding land still contains reminders of their past lives in rock engravings, cave paintings, axe-grinding grooves, and shell middens.

=== European settlement ===
The suburb draws its name from a property established in 1816 by former convict Samuel Larkin. The property was actually where modern-day St Helens Park is located. One of the earliest properties in what is now known as Ambarvale was a dairy farm called Glen Lora. In 1972, the farms were sold for housing, and the new suburb was officially opened in 1976.

== Demographics ==
According to the 2021 census of population, there were 7,254 people in Ambarvale.

- Aboriginal and Torres Strait Islander people made up 6.9% of the population.
- 67.0% of people were born in Australia. The most next most common countries of birth were Philippines 2.7%, New Zealand 2.4% and England 2.1%.
- 69.2% of people only spoke English at home. Other languages spoken at home included Arabic 3.5%, Spanish 2.1% and Samoan 1.6%.
- The most common responses for religion were No Religion 29.3%, Catholic 23.2% and Anglican 12.3%.

== Commercial area ==
Ambarvale has an ALDI shopping centre on Woodhouse Drive. This was completed early in 2010, with the old shopping centre being demolished. Beside ALDI is the Ambarvale Tavern, which has a bistro and gambling facilities. Just north of the suburb is Macarthur Square shopping centre, one of the largest shopping centres in southwestern Sydney.

== Transport ==
Macarthur railway station is located just north of Ambarvale, providing connection to Campbelltown Liverpool and the Sydney central business district via the Airport & South Line of the Sydney Trains network. NSW TrainLink also services Macarthur providing connections to the Southern Highlands, Canberra, Griffith and Melbourne. Bus services are provided by Transit Systems, leaving from Kellicar Road (under the bridge). The routes are 870–4, 886–89, 890–98 to and from Campbelltown.

== Schools ==
The suburb contains two public primary schools, Ambarvale Public and Thomas Acres Public, plus one public high school, Thomas Reddall High School. The high school named Ambarvale High School is actually located in Rosemeadow.

== Housing ==
The majority of housing in Ambarvale is in the form of detached houses although attached houses and walk-up flats also exist. The majority of dwellings in Ambarvale were constructed in the 1970s and 1980s.

Streets in Ambarvale are named after characters from the novels of Charles Dickens, examples include:

- Quilp Place
- Copperfield Drive
- Havisham Way
- Boythorn Avenue
- Nickleby Way
- Gargery Street
