= Glen Alpine, New South Wales =

Glen Alpine
- Suburb
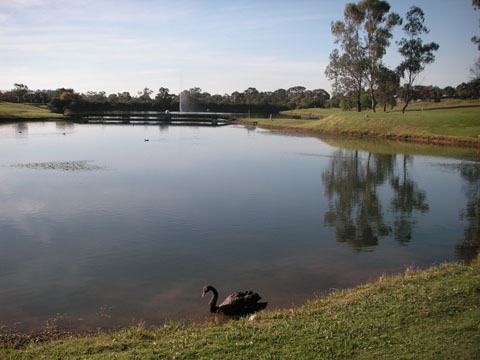
- Campbelltown Golf Course, Glen Alpine

- Interactive map of Glen Alpine
- Country: Australia
- State: New South Wales
- City: Sydney
- LGA: City of Campbelltown
- Location: 56 km (35 mi) SW of Sydney CBD
- Established: 1986

Government
  - State electorate: Campbelltown
  - Federal division: Macarthur
- Elevation: 108 m (354 ft)

Population
  - Total: 4,429 (2021 census)
- Postcode: 2560
Suburbs around Glen Alpine
Mount Annan	Campbelltown	Englorie Park
Menangle Park	Glen Alpine	Ambarvale
Gilead	Rosemeadow	Rosemeadow

Glen Alpine is a suburb of Sydney, in the state of New South Wales, Australia. Glen Alpine is located 56 kilometres south-west of the Sydney central business district, in the local government area of the City of Campbelltown and is part of the Macarthur region.

== History ==
Glen Alpine began as a golf course estate with houses constructed mainly inside the looping design of the 18 hole course. The suburb features local shops and a tennis complex 500 metres from the golf course clubhouse. From the late 1990s, development expanded outside this ring towards the local shopping centre Macarthur Square.

In the past few years a new estate, Macarthur Gardens has been developed in the area between the 6th hole, Menangle Road and Macarthur Square. This development consists of over 50 new single and double storey houses on much smaller blocks than those of Glen Alpine. The modern style of these homes complements those of Glen Alpine. Englorie Park is another new development in this area between Glen Alpine and Ambarvale.

The name Glen Alpine dates back to the 1820s when Thomas Reddall, who lends his name to Thomas Reddall High School in neighbouring Ambarvale, built a house with that name. The house burnt down in the early 1900s and the site is now called Heritage Park on Abington Crescent. But not long after the house burnt down, property owner James Sheil built a new Glen Alpine and this house remains in Bell Tree Close.

== Population ==
In the 2021 Census, there were 4,429 people in Glen Alpine. 70.1% of people were born in Australia. The next most common country of birth was England at 3.5%. 74.4% of people spoke only English at home. Other languages spoken at home included Arabic at 4.2%. The most common responses for religion were Catholic 31.0%, No Religion 18.3% and Anglican 15.7%.

== Housing ==
The suburb is low density residential with blocks between 800sqm and 1900sqm. Most homes are less than 30 years old and are styled as modern heritage though other designs are common.

According to the 2021 census, 98.3% of privately occupied Glen Alpine homes were detached housing. Most were: owned outright (41.1%), or in the process of being bought (49.8%). The median home loan repayment of $2,167 per month was higher than the national median of $1,863.

== Golf course ==
Campbelltown Golf Course is an 18-hole championship course located at Glen Alpine. It is listed as 5764m long, has a par of 70 and is open to the public.

=== Notable residents ===
- Former Australian Labor Party leader Mark Latham.
