= Thomas Reddall High School =

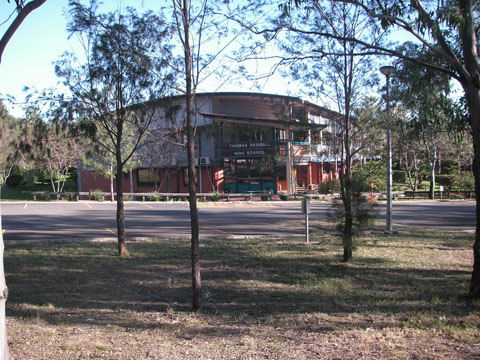
- Thomas Reddall High School

Location
- Ambarvale, South Western Sydney, New South Wales; Australia; 34°05′S 150°48′E

Information
- Type: Government-funded co-educational comprehensive secondary day school
- Motto: Focusing on our future
- Established: 1991; 35 years ago
- School district: Campbelltown
- Educational authority: New South Wales Department of Education
- Principal: Ms Carla Scott
- Years: 7–12
- Enrolment: 570 (2019)
- Campus: Suburban
- Colours: Maroon and white
- Website: thomasredd-h.schools.nsw.gov.au

Thomas Reddall High School is a government-funded co-educational comprehensive school in Ambarvale, a south-western suburb of Sydney, New South Wales, Australia.

Established in 1991, the school caters to approximately 570 students from Year 7 to Year 12, including 10 percent who identify as Indigenous Australians and 39 percent from a language background other than English. The school is operated by the New South Wales Department of Education.

== Heritage Groups ==
NASCA Group - Ms Bullock, Cameron and Josh

OHANA Group - Betty

== Name ==
The school is named after Thomas Reddall, the first headmaster and the first Anglican clergyman appointed to Campbelltown. Reddall supervised the (c. 1823) construction of nearby St Peter's Church of England, Campbelltown, and lived in what is now the suburb of Glen Alpine, which forms part of the school's catchment area.

== See also ==
- List of government schools in New South Wales
- Education in Australia
