= Macarthur Square =

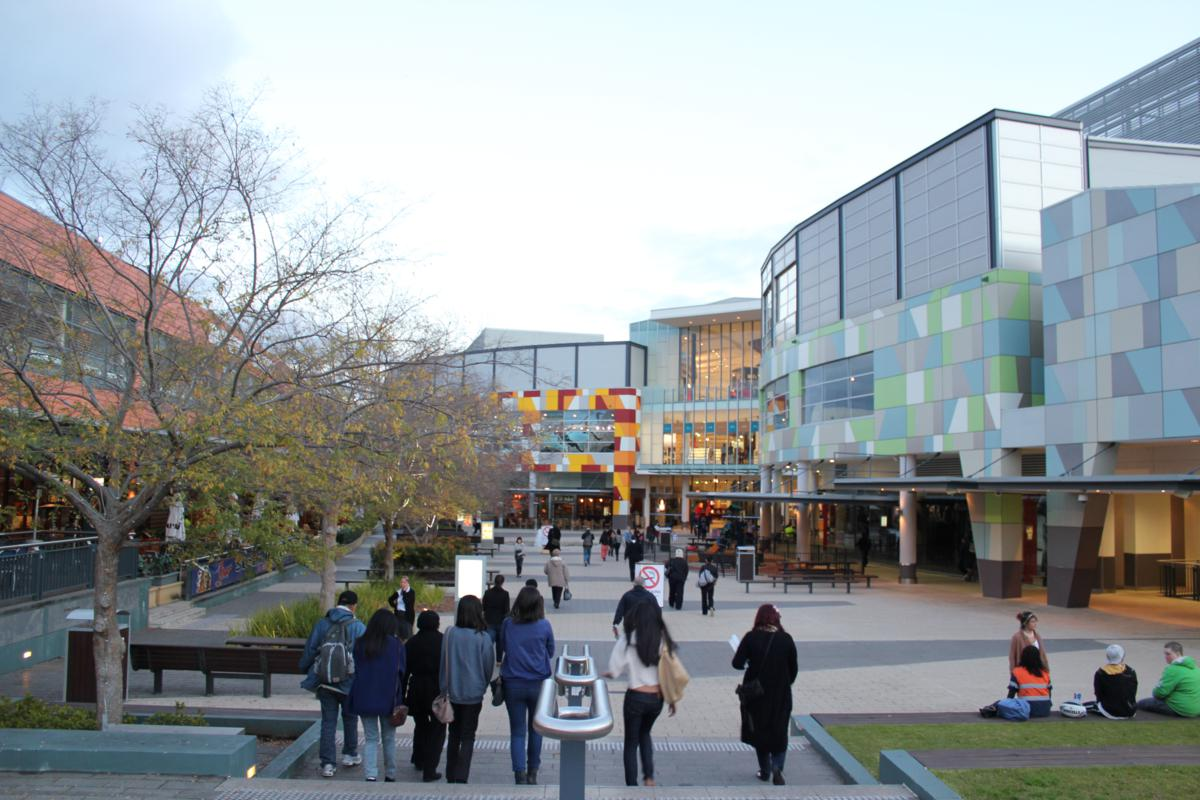
- Macarthur Square's Kellicar Lane precinct
- Location: Campbelltown, New South Wales, Australia
- Coordinates: 34°04′30″S 150°47′53″E
- Address: 200 Gilchrist Drive
- Opened: 10 September 1979
- Manager: Lendlease
- Owner: GPT Group (50%); Australian Prime Property Fund (50%)
- Num. of stores: 331
- Num. of anchor tenants: 9
- Floor area: 107,000 m^{2} (1,150,000 sq ft)
- Floors: 3
- Parking: 2,560 spaces
- Public transit: Macarthur station
- Website: macarthursquare.com.au

Macarthur Square is a large indoor/outdoor shopping centre located in the south western Sydney suburb of Campbelltown, New South Wales, Australia. It was developed by Lendlease and GPT Group, opening on 10 September 1979. The shopping centre is situated adjacent to Macarthur railway station.

A $160 million expansion in 2005, which increased the centre's floor area from 29,000 to 90,000 m^{2} (310,000 to 970,000 sq ft), saw Macarthur Square become one of the largest shopping complexes in Sydney. A further development in 2017 increased the retail floor area to 107,000 m^{2} (1,150,000 sq ft).

== History ==
Macarthur Square was opened on 10 September 1979 by Paul Landa, Minister for Planning and Environment. Macarthur Square was seen as a major regional shopping centre for the Macarthur Growth Centre in south-western Sydney. The NSW State Planning Authority purchased large tracts of land in the Campbelltown area in the 1960s. The Authority produced a structure plan in 1973 under the title of the Campbelltown-Camden-Appin Three Cities Plan. An agreement between the state government in NSW and the Whitlam government provided funds for land acquisition and urban development, to establish the Macarthur Growth Centre. The Macarthur Development Board bought and sold land, developed industrial estates and the Macarthur Square shopping centre.

In December 1983, a 3-year-old boy named Ali Elassad fell 10 metres from one of the balconies to the floor below and fractured his skull, but he survived and returned home in time for Christmas and was dubbed "The miracle boy of Sydney".

== Shopping and facilities ==
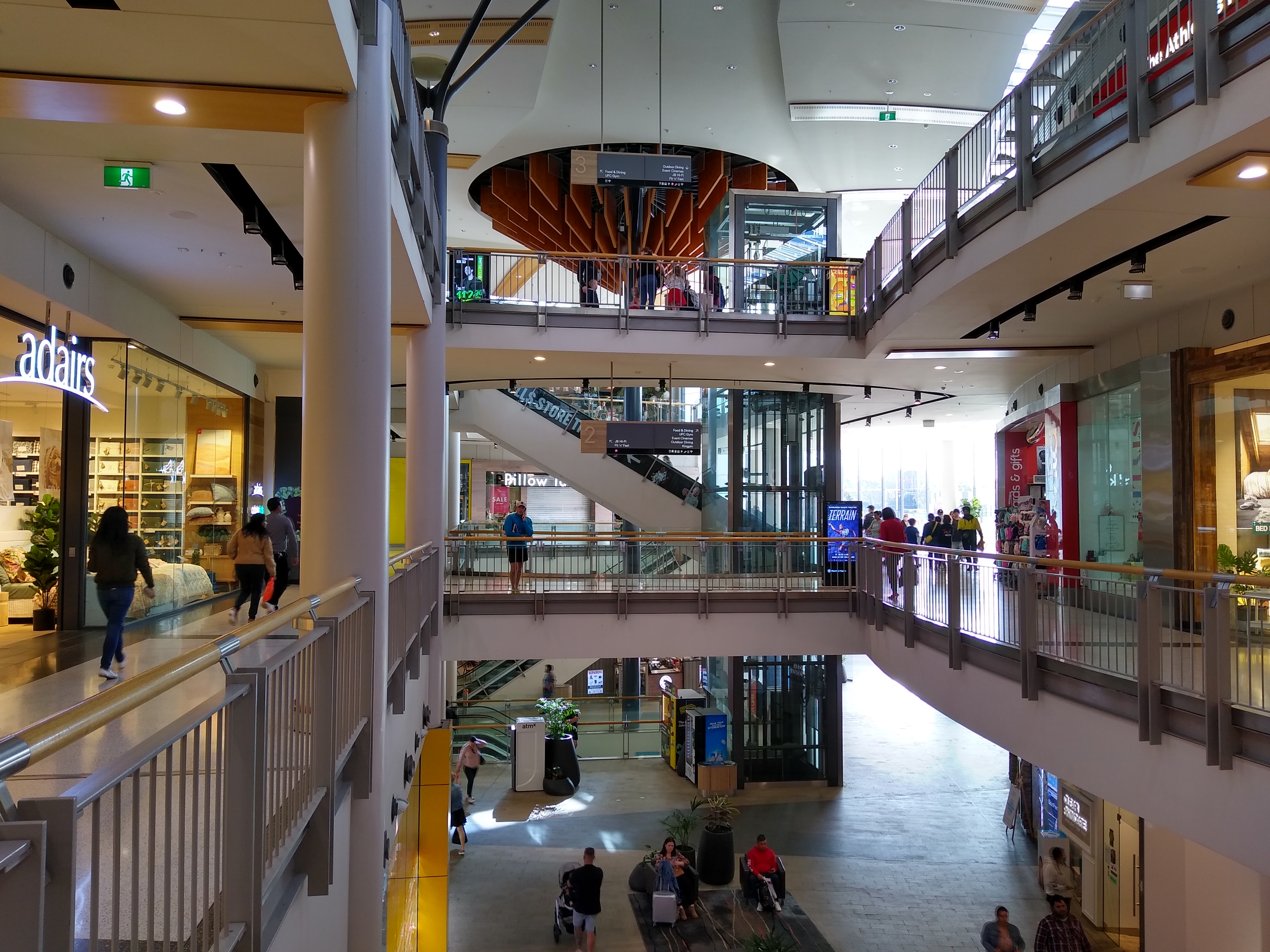
Interior

Major retailers and stores of Macarthur Square include Aldi, Best & Less, Big W, Club Lime, Coles, Cotton On, Dan Murphy's, David Jones, Event Cinemas, H&M, JB Hi-Fi, JD Sports, Kingpin Bowling, Lincraft, Rebel, Roni's Home Depot Target, Ultimate Fighting Championship, Uniqlo and Woolworths. The centre also features an outdoor entertainment and restaurant precinct known as "Kellicar Lane". This area opened during the expansion in November 2005.

Above Kellicar Lane is a food court that has large glass windows that look over Kellicar Lane, Campbelltown and the surrounding countryside.

=== 2016/17 development ===
A $240 million development added a relocated and refurbished Coles supermarket, a redeveloped flagship David Jones store, and a new H&M, as well as a new fresh food hall, dining terrace and 45 speciality stores. In addition, a new Aldi supermarket and full line Harris Scarfe store were developed end of 2017. Harris Scarfe has since closed down.
