= Greg Warren (politician) =

Australian politician (born 1973)

Greg Warren MP
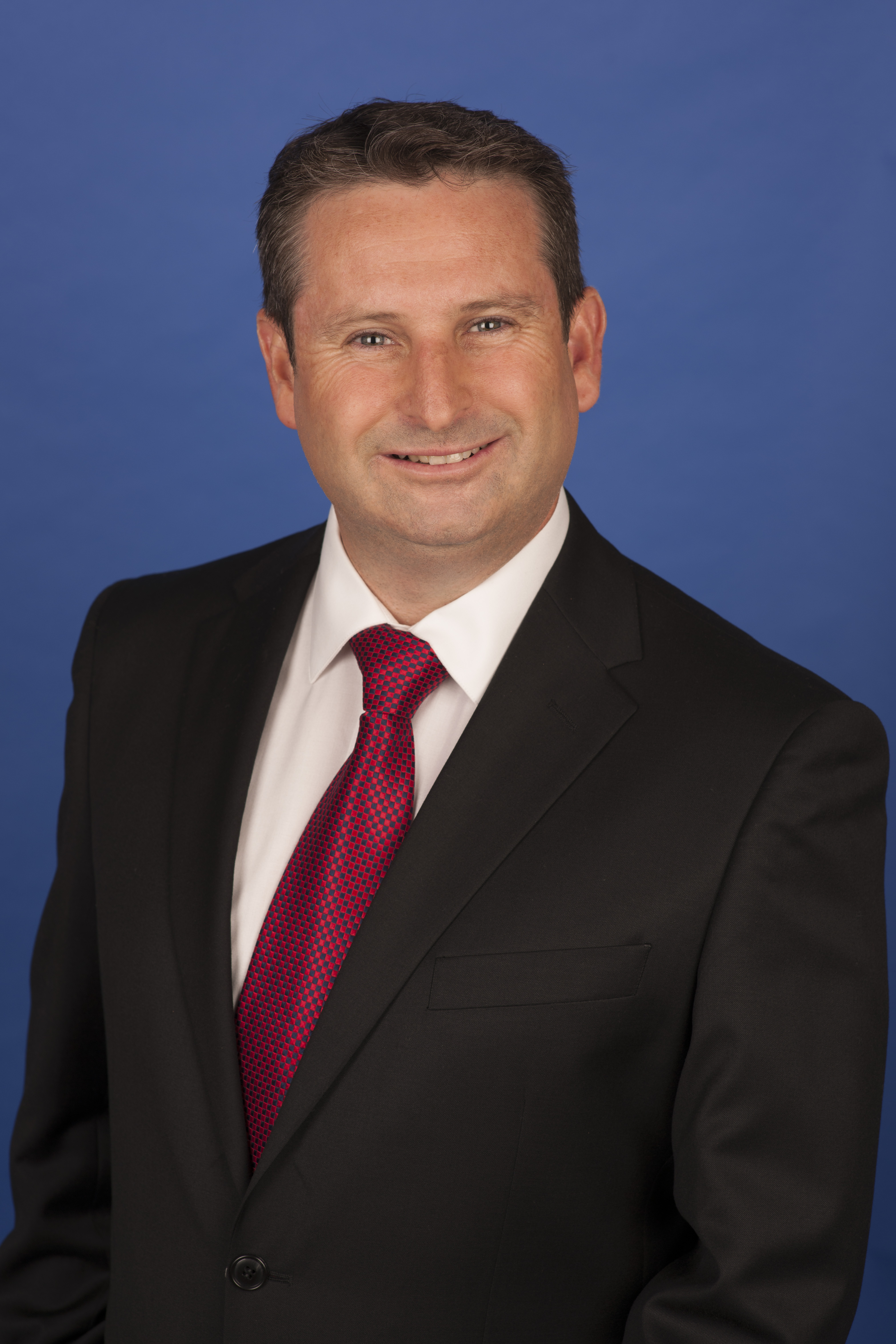
- Greg Warren MP in July 2014

Member of the New South Wales Legislative Assembly for Campbelltown
- Incumbent
- Assumed office 28 March 2015
- Preceded by: Bryan Doyle

Parliamentary Secretary to the Deputy Premier, for Western Sydney and for Education and Early Learning
- Incumbent
- Assumed office 26 April 2023
- Minister: Prue Car
- Preceded by: Gurmesh Singh (as Parliamentary Secretary to the Deputy Premier); Kevin Conolly (as Parliamentary Secretary for Education)

Personal details
- Born: Gregory Charles Warren; 6 November 1973 (age 52) Dubbo, New South Wales, Australia
- Party: Labor Party
- Children: Two sons
- Occupation: Politician
- Website: www.gregwarren.com.au

Military service
- Allegiance: Australia
- Branch/service: Australian Army
- Years of service: 1990–1999
- Rank: Corporal

Gregory Charles Warren (born 6 November 1973) is an Australian politician who was elected to the New South Wales Legislative Assembly as the Labor Party member for Campbelltown at the 2015 New South Wales state election.

Warren was a Camden Councillor, having served as mayor from 2011 to 2012, and worked in business logistics. His preselection was the first community preselection held by the New South Wales Australian Labor Party. Following his reelection at the 2019 New South Wales state election, he was appointed to Shadow Ministry under the portfolios of Local Government, Veterans Affairs and Western Sydney.

Greg was appointed as a Parliamentary Secretary in 2023.

He has been a proponent of a national park to protect koalas in south west Sydney.

New South Wales Legislative Assembly
Preceded by Bryan Doyle	Member for Campbelltown; 2015–present	Incumbent
