= Graham West =

Australian politician

The Honourable Graham West
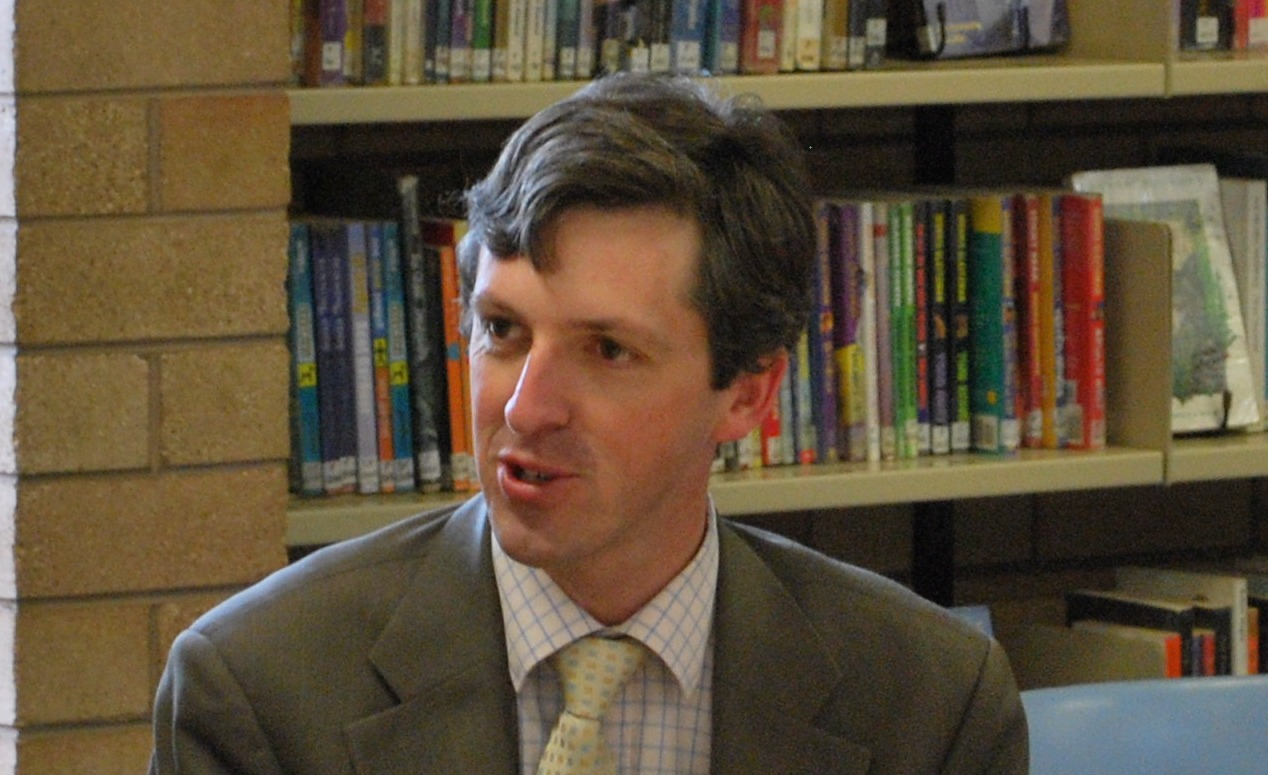

Minister for Juvenile Justice
- In office 8 September 2008 – 5 June 2010
- Premier: Nathan Rees; Kristina Keneally
- Preceded by: Barbara Perry
- Succeeded by: Barbara Perry

Member of the New South Wales Parliament for Campbelltown
- In office 3 February 2001 – 14 February 2011
- Preceded by: Michael Knight
- Succeeded by: Bryan Doyle

Personal details
- Born: 21 September 1973 (age 53) Campbelltown, New South Wales, Australia
- Party: Labor Party

Graham James West (born 21 September 1973) an Australian former politician. He was a member of the New South Wales Legislative Assembly for Campbelltown between 2001 and 2011 for the Labor Party.

West was elected Member for Campbelltown at a by-election on 3 February 2001 following the resignation of Labor MP Michael Knight. He was re-elected at the general election in March 2003 and Premier Bob Carr appointed him as Parliamentary Secretary Assisting the Treasurer and Minister for State Development. He was re-elected on 24 March 2007 and was appointed Minister for Gaming and Racing, and Minister for Sport and Recreation.

He was appointed Minister for Juvenile Justice, Minister for Volunteering and Minister for Youth in the New South Wales State Government on 8 September 2008. On 4 June 2010, West announced in Parliament his decision to resign from Cabinet and would not contest the 2011 state election, giving his motivation as a desire to work for communities and organisations in a non-partisan way.

In November 2010, he was appointed as the chief executive officer of the NSW State Council of the St Vincent de Paul Society. In 2012, he was appointed to the Society's Australia National Council as a vice president and was elected Australian National President in March 2015. He is also a member of the International Council General of the Society, and Chair of the International Finance and Accountability Commission and Concordat.

New South Wales Legislative Assembly
Preceded by Michael Knight	Member for Campbelltown; 2001–2011	Succeeded by Bryan Doyle
Political offices
Preceded by Reba Meagher	Minister Assisting the Premier on Citizenship; 2007	Succeeded by Barbara Perry
Preceded by Diane Beamer	Minister for Western Sydney; 2007	Succeeded by Barbara Perry
Preceded by Sandra Nori	Minister for Sport and Recreation; 2007–2008	Succeeded by Kevin Greene
Preceded by Grant McBride	Minister for Gaming and Racing; 2007–2008	Succeeded by Kevin Greene
Preceded by Barbara Perry	Minister for Juvenile Justice; 2008–2010	Succeeded by Barbara Perry
Preceded by Linda Burney	Minister for Youth; 2008–2009	Succeeded by Peter Primrose
Preceded by Linda Burney	Minister for Volunteering; 2008–2009	Succeeded by Peter Primrose
New title	Minister Assisting the Premier on Veterans Affairs; 2009	Succeeded by Peter Primrose
