= Michael Knight (Australian politician) =

Australian politician

The Honourable Michael Knight AO
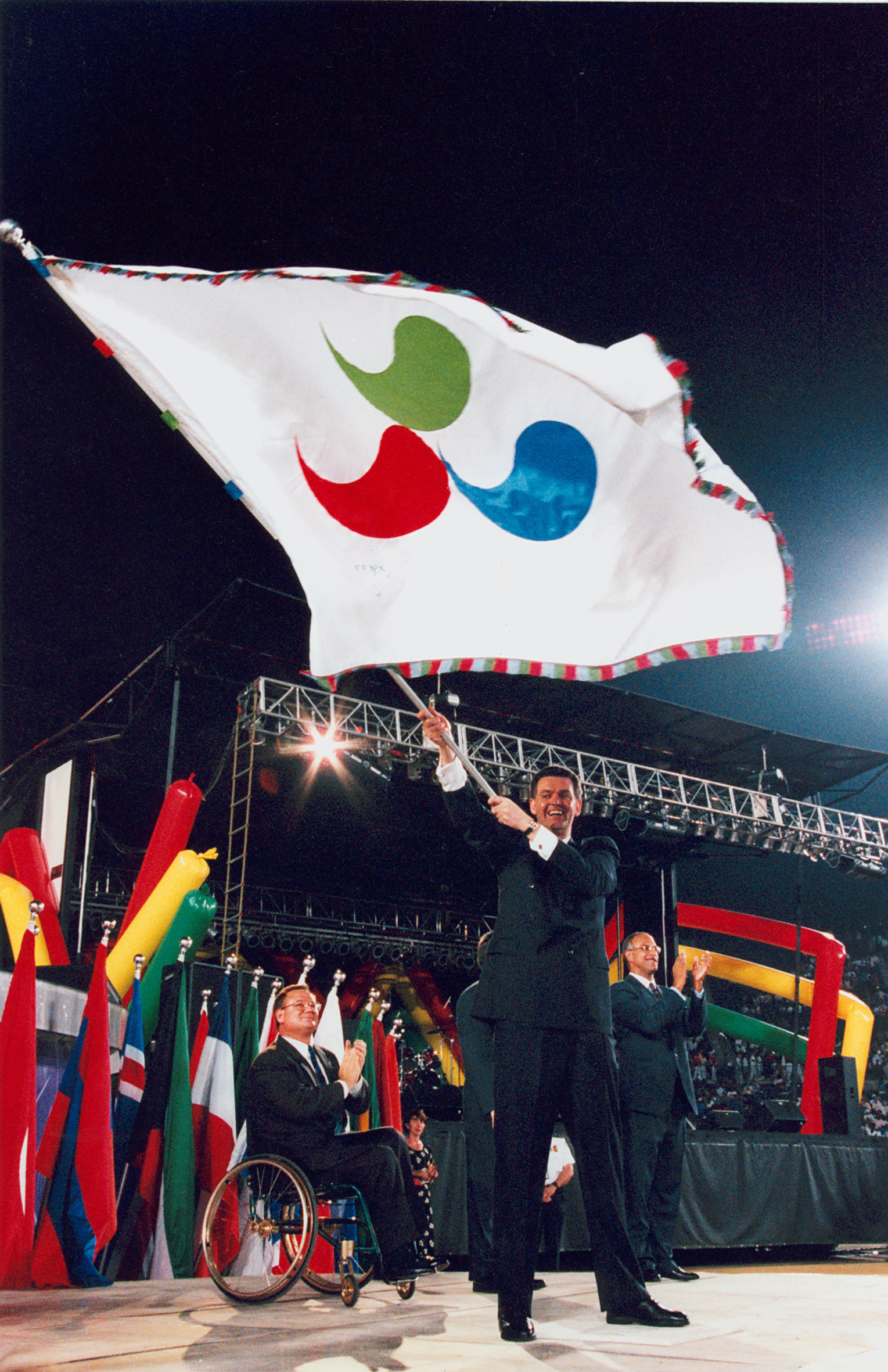
- Michael Knight with the IPC flag at the closing ceremony of the 1996 Summer Paralympics

Member of the New South Wales Parliament for Campbelltown
- In office 19 September 1981 – 12 January 2001
- Preceded by: Cliff Mallam
- Succeeded by: Graham West

Minister for the Olympics
- In office 4 April 1995 – 12 January 2001
- Premier: Bob Carr
- Succeeded by: abolished

Minister for Public Works and Services
- In office 4 April 1995 – 15 December 1995
- Premier: Bob Carr

Minister for Roads
- In office 4 April 1995 – 28 November 1996
- Premier: Bob Carr
- Preceded by: Bruce Baird
- Succeeded by: Carl Scully

President of the Sydney Organising Committee for the Olympic Games
- In office 18 September 1996 – 1 October 2000
- IOC President: Juan Antonio Samaranch
- Preceded by: Billy Payne; John Iliffe
- Succeeded by: Gianna Angelopoulos-Daskalaki

Chair of the Sydney Organising Committee for the Olympic Games
- In office 18 September 1996 – 31 October 2001
- Preceded by: John Iliffe
- Succeeded by: Position dissolved

Personal details
- Born: Michael Steven Knight; 21 September 1952 (age 74) Leichhardt, New South Wales
- Party: Australian Labor Party
- Spouse: Anne
- Children: Two daughters
- Education: University of Sydney
- Profession: Probation and parole officer

Michael Steven Knight AO (born 21 September 1952 in Leichhardt, New South Wales) is a former Australian Labor Party politician. He was member for Campbelltown in the New South Wales Legislative Assembly between 1981 and 2001. He served as Minister for the Olympics between 1995 and 2001 in the Carr government.

== Background and early career ==
Knight attended Doonside High School and Cranbrook School. He graduated with a Bachelor of Arts (Honours) from the University of Sydney and worked for the Campbelltown City Council as a social planner and parole officer before entering politics.

== Political career ==
Knight entered the New South Wales Legislative Assembly at the 1981 election succeeding Cliff Mallam who had held the seat for ten years. Originally a member of the left–wing faction, Knight defected to right–wing faction after a trip in Europe which convinced him that socialism had failed.

Knight remained on the back bench until 1995 when he was appointed to the state Cabinet with ministerial responsibilities for Public Works and Services, the Olympics and Roads. His responsibilities were later in 1995 reduced to Roads and Olympics. In 1996 this was further reduced to responsibility for the Olympics, a portfolio he held until his retirement in 2001. As Minister for the Olympics he was Chair of the Sydney Organising Committee for the Olympic Games.

== Post political career ==
In 2007, Knight was appointed to the chair of the Board of the Sydney Olympic Park Authority, the body which manages the day-to-day running and future development of Sydney Olympic Park. He was reappointed to the Board as its chairman in 2013, and his term expired in June 2016.

Knight was a director of the state–owned corporation, Delta Electricity, until December 2010 when he was one of the four directors who resigned en masse in protest of the privatisation of the generating assets of the company. During 2005 he also served as chairman of Sydney Gas Limited, prior to its takeover by the Australian Gas Light Company.

He is also the non-executive chairman of InfraShore, a public-private partnership consortium between Thiess and the Royal Bank of Scotland in charge of the billion-dollar redevelopment of Royal North Shore Hospital.

== Honours ==
In January 2002, Knight was appointed an Officer of the Order of Australia for services to: Olympic and Paralympic sport, particularly in the area of Games' administration; to the New South Wales Parliament; and, to the community of Campbelltown.

In 2000, Knight was awarded a Gold Olympic Order by the IOC at the closing ceremony of the Sydney 2000 Olympic Games.

== Personal ==
Knight is married to Anne, and they have two daughters. He is a keen supporter of Wests Tigers rugby league team.

Sporting positions
Preceded by (United States) Billy Payne	President of Organizing Committee for Summer Olympic Games; 2000	Succeeded by (Greece) Gianna Angelopoulos-Daskalaki
New South Wales Legislative Assembly
Preceded by Cliff Mallam	Member for Campbelltown; 1981–2001	Succeeded by Graham West
Political offices
Preceded by Ian Armstong	Minister for Public Works and Services; 1995–1995	Succeeded by Carl Scully
Preceded by Bruce Baird	Minister for Roads; 1995–1996	Succeeded by Carl Scully
New portfolio	Minister for the Olympics; 1995–2001	Portfolio abolished
