= Electoral district of Campbelltown =

Australian state electorate

Campbelltown New South Wales—Legislative Assembly
- Interactive map of district boundaries from the 2023 state election
- State: New South Wales
- Created: 1968
- MP: Greg Warren
- Party: Labor Party
- Namesake: Campbelltown, New South Wales
- Electors: 54,579 (2019)
- Area: 199 km^{2} (76.8 sq mi)
- Demographic: Outer-metropolitan
Electorates around Campbelltown:
Leppington; Camden	Macquarie Fields	Holsworthy
Camden; Wollondilly	Campbelltown	Heathcote
Wollondilly	Wollondilly	Heathcote

Campbelltown is an electoral district of the Legislative Assembly of the Australian state of New South Wales in Sydney's South-west. It includes the suburbs of Airds, Ambarvale, Blair Athol, Blairmount, Bradbury, Campbelltown, Claymore, Eagle Vale, Englorie Park, Gilead, Glen Alpine, Kentlyn, Leumeah, Menangle Park, Rosemeadow, Ruse, St Helens Park, Wedderburn and Woodbine.

It is represented by Greg Warren of the Labor Party.

== Members for Campbelltown ==
Member	Party	Period
Max Dunbier	Liberal	1968–1971
Cliff Mallam	Labor	1971–1981
Michael Knight	Labor	1981–2001
Graham West	Labor	2001–2011
Bryan Doyle	Liberal	2011–2015
Greg Warren	Labor	2015–present

== Election results ==
2023 New South Wales state election: Campbelltown
Party	Candidate	Votes	%	±%
Labor	Greg Warren	25,629	53.7	+1.9
Liberal	Gypshouna Paudel	8,104	17.0	−9.8
One Nation	Adam Zahra	5,498	11.5	+11.5
Greens	Jayden Rivera	2,876	6.0	+0.9
Liberal Democrats	Rosa Sicari	2,339	4.9	+4.9
Animal Justice	Matt Twaddell	1,866	3.9	+0.1
Sustainable Australia	Howard Jones	867	1.8	−0.4
Independent	Tofick Galiell	549	1.2	+1.2
Total formal votes		47,728	95.3	+0.4
Informal votes		2,358	4.7	−0.4
Turnout		50,086	86.2	−1.8
Two-party-preferred result
Labor	Greg Warren	28,764	73.3	+7.3
Liberal	Gypshouna Paudel	10,481	26.7	−7.3
Labor hold		Swing	+7.3	
