= Campbelltown, New South Wales =

City in New South Wales, Australia

Campbelltown
- Suburb
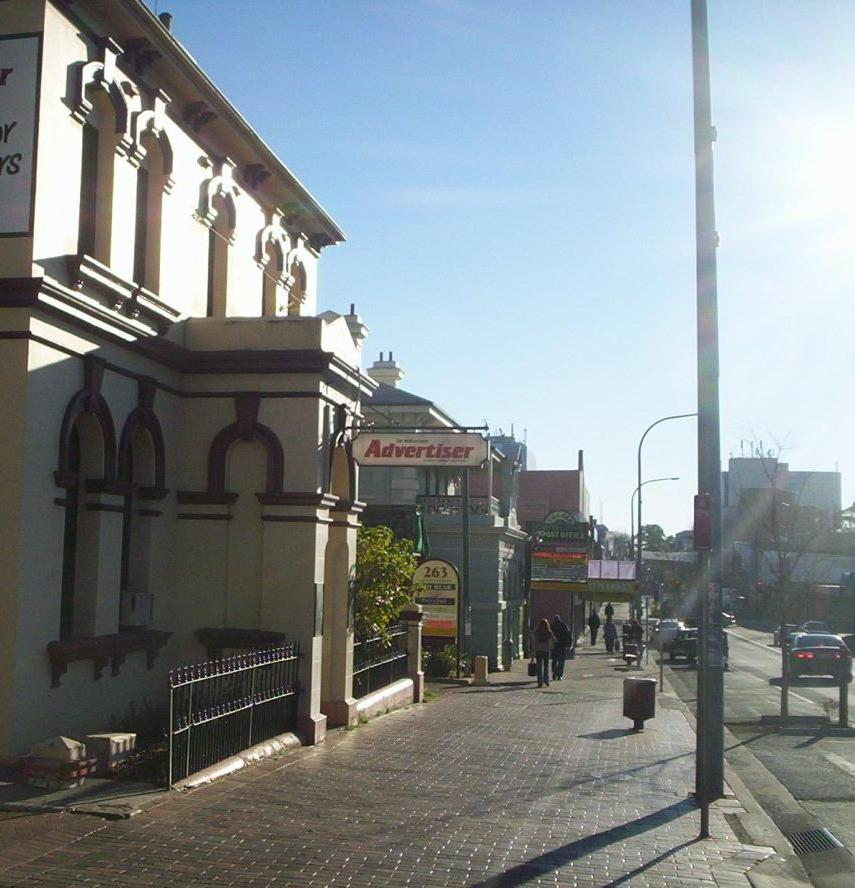
- Queen Street in Campbelltown c. 2005

- Interactive map of Campbelltown
- Country: Australia
- State: New South Wales
- Region: Greater Western Sydney; Macarthur
- City: Sydney
- LGA: Campbelltown
- Location: 57 km (35 mi) SW of Sydney CBD; 16 km (9.9 mi) N of Appin; 52 km (32 mi) NNW of Wollongong; 142 km (88 mi) NE of Goulburn
- Established: 1820

Government
  - State electorate: Campbelltown
  - Federal division: Macarthur
- Elevation: 76 m (249 ft)

Population
  - Total: 16,577 (SAL 2021)
- Postcode: 2560
Suburbs around Campbelltown
Blair Athol	Woodbine	Leumeah
Mount Annan	Campbelltown	Ruse
Glen Alpine	Ambarvale	Bradbury

Campbelltown is a suburb in Outer South Western Sydney, New South Wales, Australia. It is located 57 kilometres (35 mi) south-west of the Sydney central business district by road. Campbelltown is the administrative centre for the City of Campbelltown local government area.

== Name ==
Campbelltown gets its name from Elizabeth Campbell, the wife of former Governor of New South Wales Lachlan Macquarie. Originally called Campbell-Town, the name was later simplified to the current Campbelltown.

== History ==
The area that later became Campbelltown was inhabited prior to European settlement by the Dharug people. Not long after the arrival of the First Fleet in Sydney in 1788, a small herd of six cattle escaped and weren't seen again by the British settlers for seven years. They were spotted, however, by the Dharug people. In a rock art site called Bull Cave near Campbelltown, they drew a number of cattle with pronounced horns. The Dharug cowpasture tribes cabrogal Muringong described the cattle to British explorers and in 1795 the British found a herd of around 60 cattle grazing in the area now known as Camden.

The colonial administration was keen for the herd to establish itself so forbade killing of the cattle or settlement in the area. But John Macarthur, who wanted to establish sheep in the colony, took a liking to the prime grazing land. He convinced the British government to overrule the local administration and grant him 5,000 acres (20 km^{2}) just south of the Nepean River in 1805. Four years later a number of other grants were made to farmers between Camden and Liverpool.

The Dharug people initially worked with the local farmers but a drought in 1814 led to large numbers of neighbouring Gandangara people moving into the area in search of food. Tensions developed between the British and the Gandangara leading to skirmishes and a number of deaths on each side. Governor Macquarie felt a permanent settlement would lead to order in the area and so Campbell-Town was born in 1820.

=== Town development ===
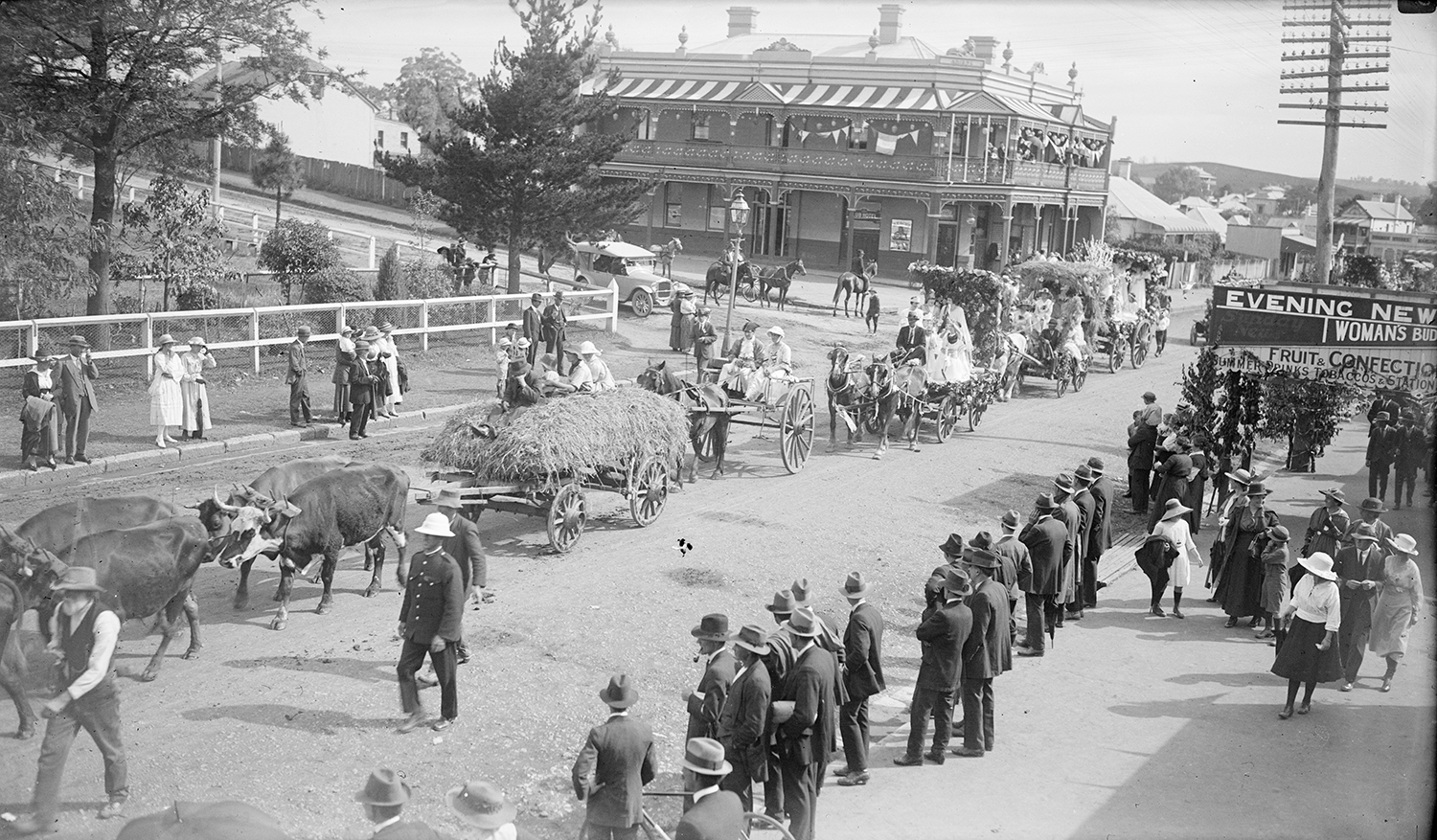
Parade for centenary celebrations near Club Hotel on corner of Queen and Cordeaux Streets, Campbelltown, Sydney, 1920

Development of the town was slow particularly after the departure of Macquarie, and it wasn't until 1831 that residents took possession of town land. However, it was during this period that Campbelltown's most famous incident occurred. In 1826, local farmer Frederick Fisher disappeared. According to folklore, his ghost appeared sitting on a fence rail over a creek just south of the town and pointed to a site where his body was later found to be buried. In memory of the incident, the Fisher's ghost festival is held each November in Campbelltown.

Campbelltown's population increased steadily in the decades following. The southern rail line was extended to Campbelltown in 1858, leading to further development, and in 1882, Campbelltown Council was established allowing municipal works to occur in earnest. Campbelltown became the first country town in New South Wales to have piped water in 1888 and in the period between the World Wars, a local power station was built to supply electricity to residents.

Campbelltown was designated in the early 1960s as a satellite city by the New South Wales Planning Authority, and a regional capital for the south west of Sydney. There was extensive building and population growth in the intervening time and the government set aside land surrounding the township for public and private housing and industry.

In June 2023, the suburb boundary with Bradbury was amended, with Campbelltown gaining some area from Bradbury. The new boundary followed the alignments of Jacka Street, Tubb Street and Cartwright Crescent. This boundary would later become the boundary with Airds, when that area of Bradbury became part of Airds in November 2024.

== Geography ==
=== Climate ===
Campbelltown has a humid subtropical climate (Köppen climate classification: Cfa) with mild to cool winters and warm to hot summers.

Climate data for Campbelltown Swimming Centre, New South Wales, Australia (1962-1984 normals and extremes)
Month	Jan	Feb	Mar	Apr	May	Jun	Jul	Aug	Sep	Oct	Nov	Dec	Year
Record high °C (°F)	45.8 (114.4)	43.0 (109.4)	40.8 (105.4)	33.9 (93.0)	28.3 (82.9)	25.6 (78.1)	24.1 (75.4)	29.0 (84.2)	35.9 (96.6)	36.8 (98.2)	42.2 (108.0)	41.0 (105.8)	45.8 (114.4)
Mean daily maximum °C (°F)	28.2 (82.8)	28.4 (83.1)	26.8 (80.2)	24.1 (75.4)	20.4 (68.7)	17.6 (63.7)	17.1 (62.8)	18.7 (65.7)	21.4 (70.5)	23.5 (74.3)	25.8 (78.4)	27.9 (82.2)	23.3 (74.0)
Daily mean °C (°F)	22.5 (72.5)	22.7 (72.9)	20.9 (69.6)	17.7 (63.9)	14.0 (57.2)	11.4 (52.5)	10.2 (50.4)	11.6 (52.9)	14.2 (57.6)	17.0 (62.6)	19.2 (66.6)	21.5 (70.7)	16.9 (62.5)
Mean daily minimum °C (°F)	16.7 (62.1)	16.9 (62.4)	15.0 (59.0)	11.2 (52.2)	7.6 (45.7)	5.2 (41.4)	3.2 (37.8)	4.5 (40.1)	7.0 (44.6)	10.4 (50.7)	12.6 (54.7)	15.1 (59.2)	10.5 (50.8)
Record low °C (°F)	7.2 (45.0)	6.1 (43.0)	3.9 (39.0)	0.0 (32.0)	−0.6 (30.9)	−2.0 (28.4)	−5.6 (21.9)	−2.5 (27.5)	−0.6 (30.9)	1.1 (34.0)	2.9 (37.2)	6.5 (43.7)	−5.6 (21.9)
Average precipitation mm (inches)	90.6 (3.57)	78.6 (3.09)	100.7 (3.96)	62.6 (2.46)	60.2 (2.37)	81.6 (3.21)	33.7 (1.33)	50.4 (1.98)	40.7 (1.60)	74.3 (2.93)	84.3 (3.32)	70.5 (2.78)	828.2 (32.6)
Average precipitation days (≥ 1 mm)	8.3	8.1	8.1	5.5	5.6	6.4	4.3	5.6	5.9	8.4	7.3	6.4	79.9

== Commercial area ==
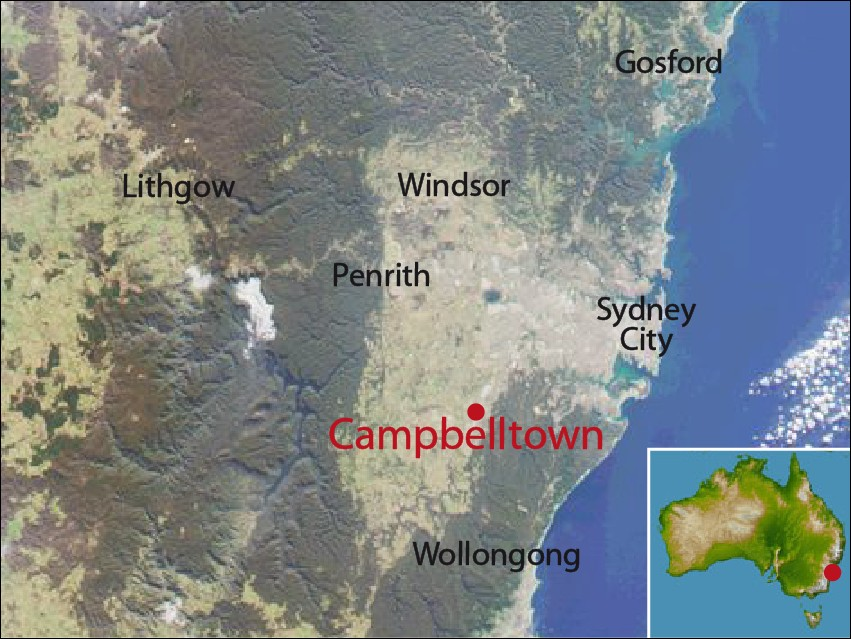
Location map of Campbelltown based on NASA satellite images

The old town centre, as laid down by Lachlan Macquarie, is still the main commercial area and includes the Queen Street shopping strip, Campbelltown Mall, Campbelltown railway station and bus interchange, the council chambers and a number of historic buildings. The main residential area is to the south and east of the town centre. On the northwestern side of the railway line is an industrial area.

Another shopping centre formerly located on Queen Street was the Brands on Sale factory outlet centre. The $65 million four-storey complex opened on 10 December 2009 with space for around 80 stores, a food court and several hundred parking spaces. The centre experienced financial difficulties and had failed commercially by November 2010.

To the southwest is a second commercial area based around Macarthur railway station which includes the University of Western Sydney and Macarthur Square, a large shopping mall. It features an outdoor entertainment and restaurant precinct known as "Kellicar Lane" which opened after an expansion in November 2005. It features a food court that has large glass windows that look over Kellicar Lane, Campbelltown and the surrounding countryside.

== Heritage listings ==
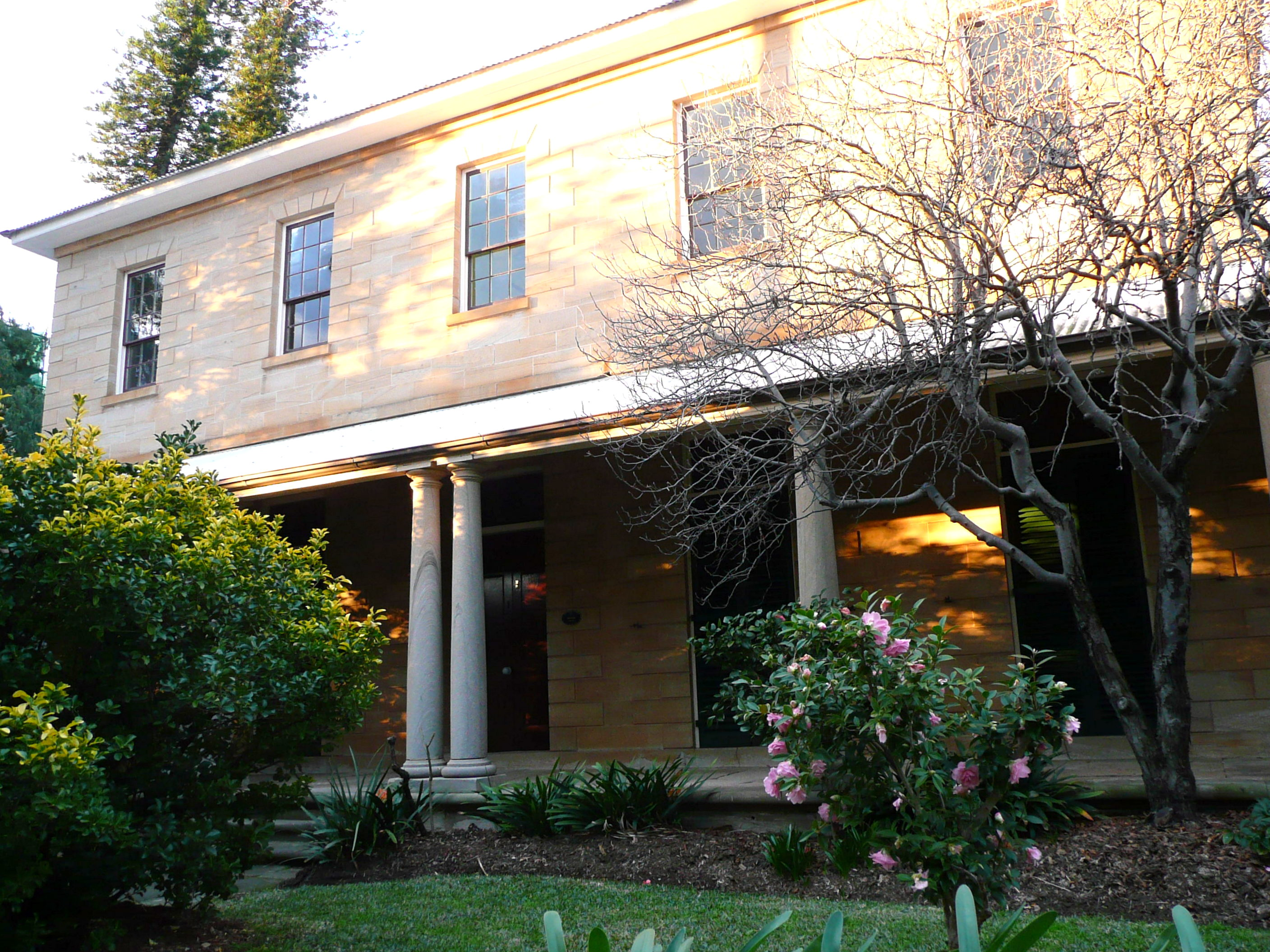
Glenalvon (1840), Lithgow Street

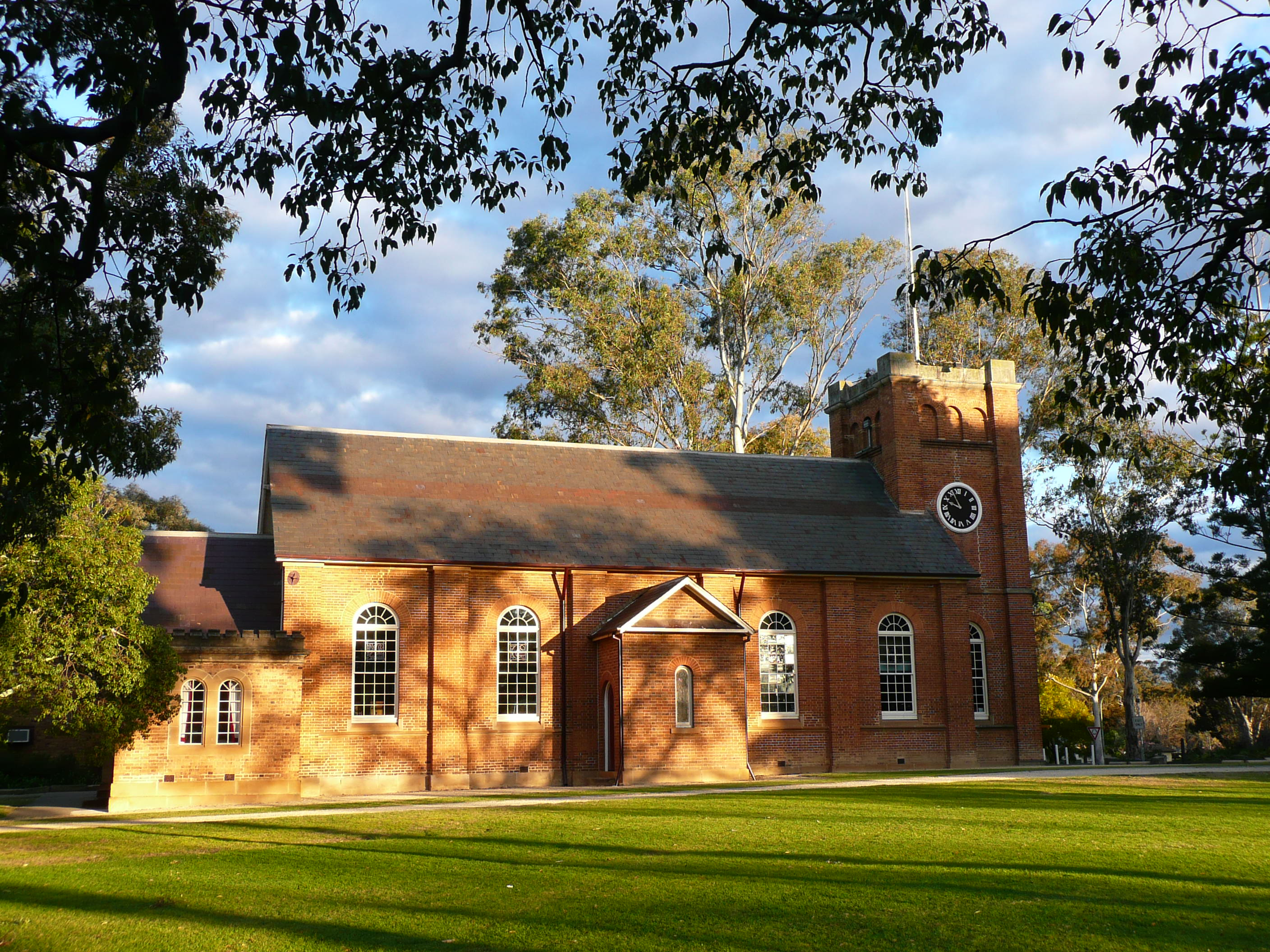
St Peter's Church (c. 1823), Cordeaux Street

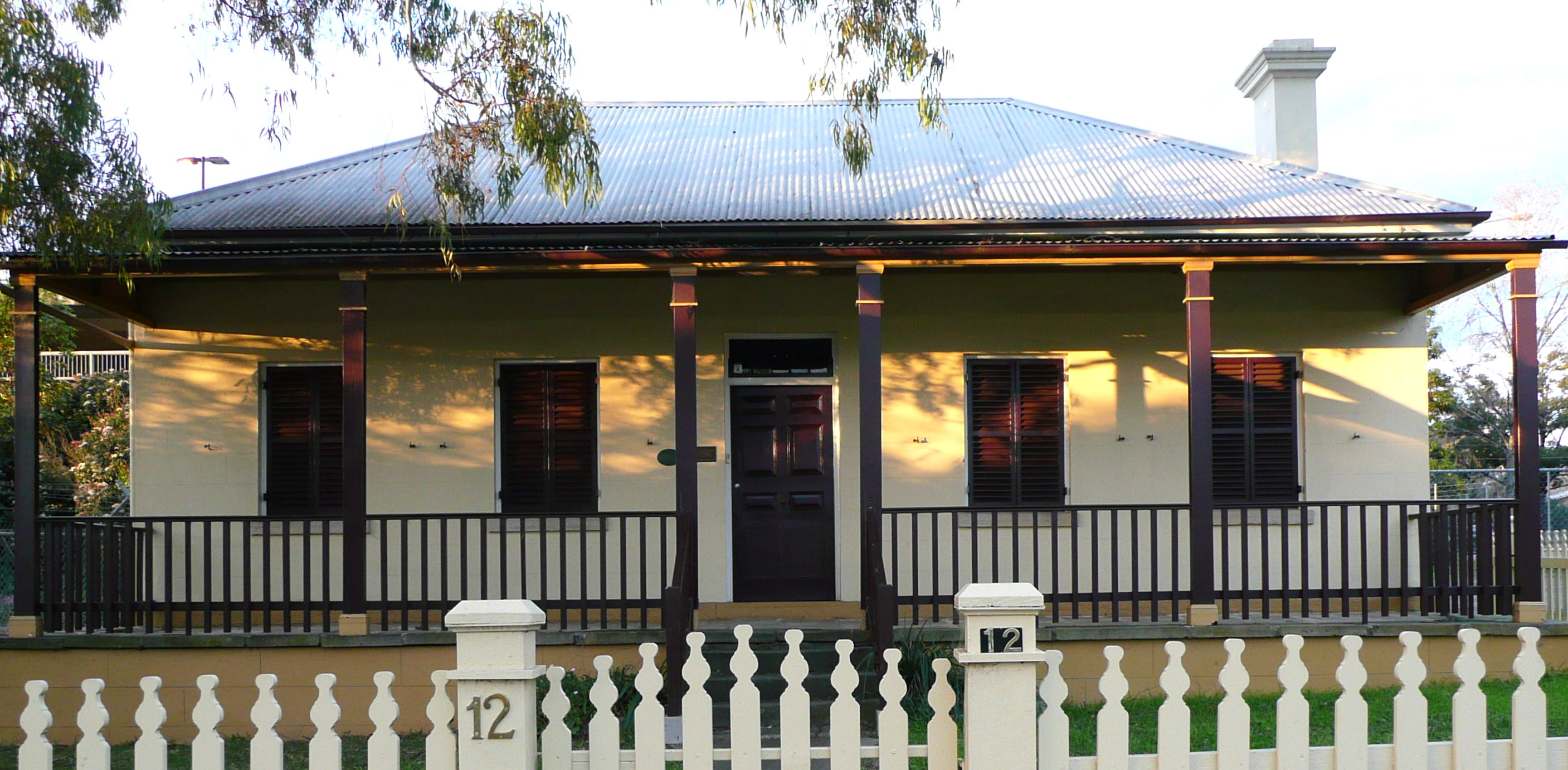
Richmond Villa (c. 1840), Lithgow Street

Campbelltown has a number of heritage-listed sites on the New South Wales State Heritage Register, including:

- Broughton Street: St John's Catholic Church, Campbelltown
- 8 Lithgow Street: Glenalvon House
- 14 - 20 Queen Street: Warbys Barn and Stables
- 261 Queen Street: Campbelltown Post Office
- 263 Queen Street: Commercial Banking Company of Sydney, Campbelltown Branch (former)
- 284 - 298 Queen Street: Queen Street Buildings
- 303 Queen Street: Dredges Cottage

The following additional buildings in central Campbelltown are listed on the (now defunct) Register of the National Estate.

- St Peter's Church of England, Cordeaux Street
- Richmond Villa, 12 Lithgow Street
- Town Hall, 315 Queen Street
- Campbelltown Court House, Queen Street
- Campbelltown Police Station, Railway Street
- Graves of Matthew Healey, James Ruse, Cemetery, George and Broughton Streets

== Transport ==
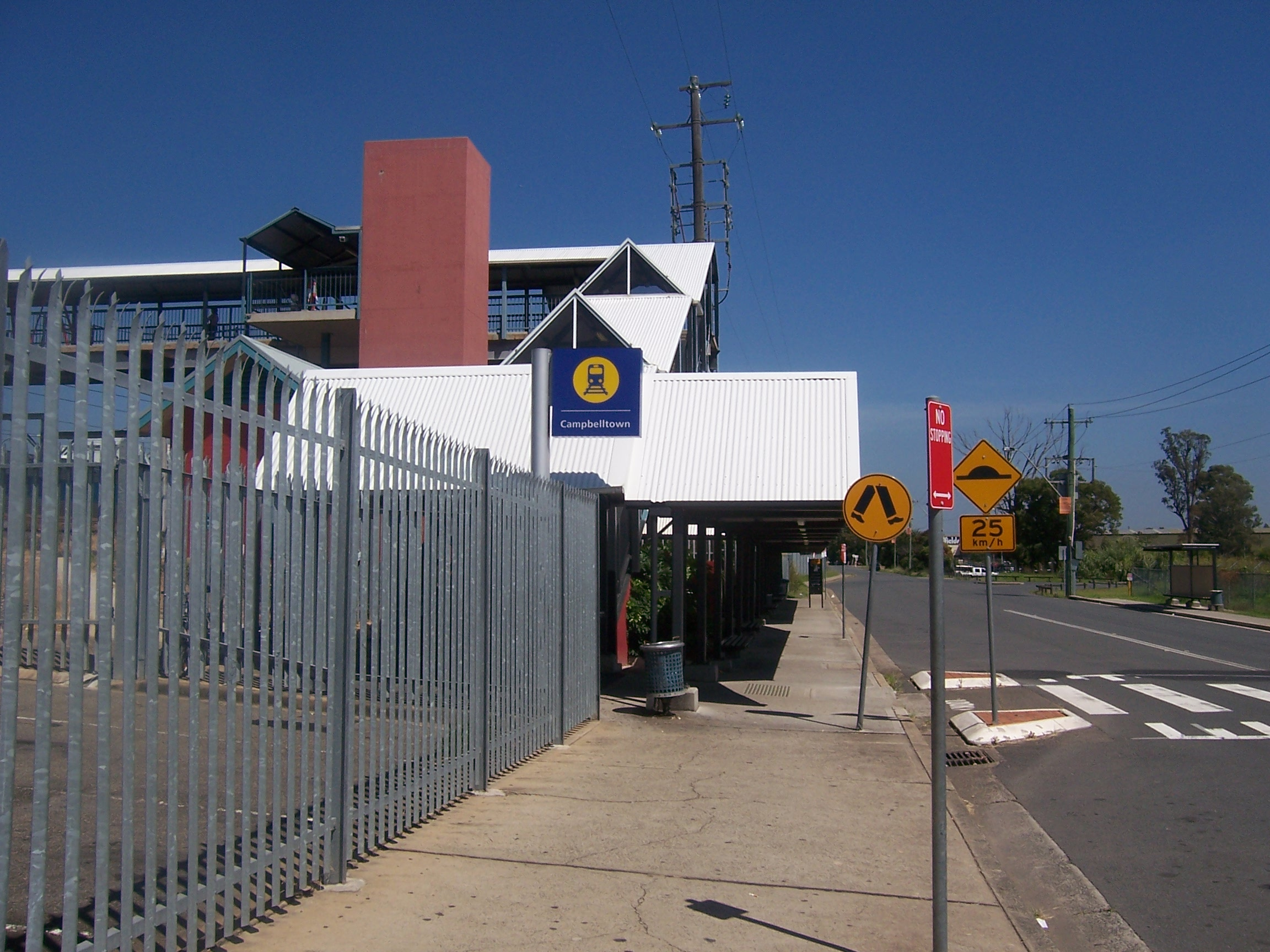
Campbelltown Railway Station

Campbelltown lies on the main road and rail links from Sydney to the south-west. The Hume Motorway links Campbelltown north to Liverpool, Sydney Airport and Sydney CBD and south to Melbourne. The B69 connects Wollongong CBD and Appin.

Campbelltown railway station and Macarthur railway station are on the Main Southern line. Campbelltown is also the northern terminus of most Southern Highlands Line intercity services. Campbelltown railway station was opened on 4 May 1858 with electrified services commencing on 5 May 1968.

Campbelltown is also well serviced by buses. Transit Systems provides a number of services from Campbelltown station to virtually all the surrounding suburbs of Campbelltown as well as to Camden, and as far north as Liverpool via Glenfield. Picton Buslines provides a service from Campbelltown to Picton via Camden. There is also a bus service that connects Wollongong to Campbelltown.

== Health ==
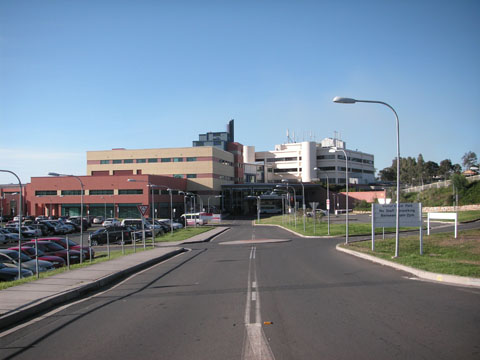
Campbelltown Hospital

Campbelltown Hospital is part of the South Western Sydney Local Health District and is located on the southern edge of the suburb near Ambarvale. Campbelltown Private Hospital is located nearby and with the Centric building constitute a close-knit, combined public-private-consulting rooms complex within a convenient radius at Park Central.

Campbelltown Hospital is a major metropolitan hospital. Its emergency department is one of the busiest in Sydney, equipped with 32 beds and will expand further with the redevelopment of the hospital. The hospital has a wide range of surgical specialties, including general surgery (and its subspecialties of Breast & Endocrine surgery and Colorectal Surgery), orthopaedic surgery, ENT surgery, ophthalmology (i.e., eye surgery), etc. Breast cancers, thyroid and parathyroid diseases, as well as colonic and rectal cancers are particularly well served by the hospital, with its surgeons managing high volumes of these diseases at both Campbelltown public and private hospitals. The Macarthur Cancer Therapy Centre is a dedicated facility providing radiotherapy, chemotherapy and multidisciplinary cancer care to the local residents

Bed capacity is currently at 340 during peak times, with a planned addition of 90 beds with the current redevelopment (stage 1), bringing it up to 430 beds by the end of 2015. The new hospital block with an additional 90 beds is nearing completion with planning of the next major stage of redevelopment already underway (stage 2). It has a well-equipped intensive care (ICU) and high dependency unit (HDU) with the ability to support ventilated and critically ill patients. The hospital is well supported by a radiology department with services including ultrasounds, CT scans as well as a state-of-the-art MRI scanner

== Education ==
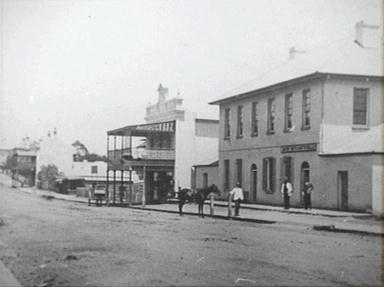
Queen Street, Campbelltown, 1893. Image courtesy Campbelltown City Library.

The Western Sydney University (old name University of Western Sydney) has a Campbelltown Campus, located on Narellan Road. It was established from 1983 as the second campus of the Macarthur Institute of Higher Education, which merged into WSU in 1989. A TAFE NSW campus operates just opposite the Campbelltown campus of WSU.

There are a number of local schools, including:

- Campbelltown Performing Arts High School
- Broughton Anglican College
- Campbelltown Public School
- Campbelltown East Public School
- Campbelltown North Public School
- St Patricks College Campbelltown
- John Therry Catholic High School
- St John the Evangelist Catholic Primary
- St Peter's Anglican Primary
- Robert Townson High School
- Mount Carmel Catholic College
- Robert Townson Public School
- Kearns Public School
- Blairmount Public School
- Claymore Public School
- Eaglevale High School
- Leumeah Public School
- Leumeah High School
- Rosemeadow Public School
- Ambarvale High School
- Sarah Redfern High School
- Sarah Redfern Public School
- Minto Public School
- The Grange Public School
- Campbellfield Public School
- Al Faisal College
- St. Peter's Anglican Primary School (Campbelltown)
- Airds High School
- Woodland Road Public School
- Bradbury Public School

In the surrounding suburbs are a number of other schools associated with Campbelltown such as Broughton Anglican College, Mount Carmel High School (Varroville), Thomas Reddall High School (Ambarvale), Ambarvale High School (Rosemeadow), Menangle Park, and St Gregory's College, Campbelltown which is located in its own suburb, Gregory Hills.

== Housing ==
The residential area has a combination of public and privately owned housing. Public housing estates are scattered across the region and the neighbouring areas.

== Population ==
According to the 2021 census, there were 16,577 people in the suburb of Campbelltown, and 176,519 residents in the Campbelltown Local Government Area.

In the suburb of Campbelltown,

- Aboriginal and Torres Strait Islander people made up 4.5% of the population.
- 58.0% of people were born in Australia. The next most common countries of birth were India 3.5%, the Philippines 3.3%, New Zealand 2.9%, England 2.5% and Bangladesh 1.9%.
- 60.3% of people only spoke English at home. Other languages spoken at home included Arabic 3.4%, Bengali 2.4%, Nepali 1.8%, Urdu 1.7% and Tagalog 1.7%.
- The most common responses for religion were No Religion 24.3%, Catholic 22.2%, Anglican 10.9% and Islam 9.7%, a further 8.5% of respondents elected not to disclose their religion.

== Notable residents ==
- Samantha Azzopardi – Con artist
- Mark Binskin – Former Chief of the Australian Defence Force
- Michael Carrington – international media executive; resided in Campbelltown from birth to the age of 13
- Tallyn Da Silva – rugby league footballer
- Michael De Vere - rugby league footballer
- Paul Denyer – Serial killer
- Becca Hatch – R&B singer
- Jarryd Hayne – rugby league, rugby union and gridiron footballer athlete
- Brett Hodgson – Former Wests Tigers captain and current head coach of the Western Suburbs Magpies
- Trent Hodkinson – rugby league footballer
- Mark Hunt – New Zealand mixed martial arts fighter
- Alanna Kennedy – Footballer for the Matildas, Manchester City and Sydney FC
- Emcee Kerser – rapper
- Joseph Leary – Former solicitor, politician.
- Peter Fitzallan MacDonald – pastoralist, entrepreneur and politician.
- John Marsden – Lawyer, appointed Member of the Order of Australia
- Trent Peoples – rugby league footballer
- Jim Piper – swimmer
- James Ruse – Early settler and farmer; Ruse, New South Wales named after him
- Jai Waetford – X Factor finalist
- Lisa Wilkinson – The Project co-host on the Network 10
- William Hardy Wilson – Architect, artist and author; regarded as "one of the most outstanding architects of the twentieth century"

== Culture ==
=== The Arts ===
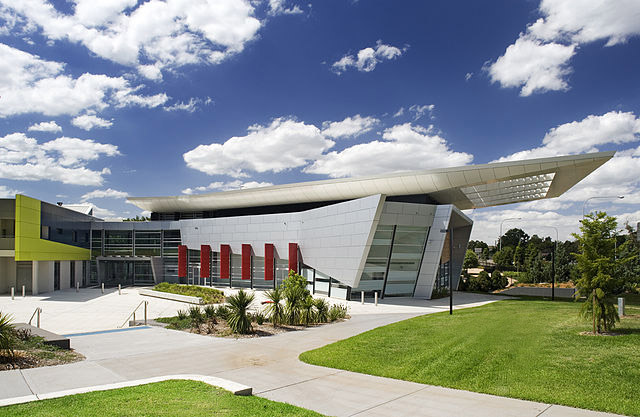
Campbelltown Arts Centre

The Campbelltown Arts Centre, situated just south of the main town centre features a 180-seat performance space, exhibition galleries and workspaces. Outside is a sculpture garden and a Japanese Gardens and Teahouse that was a gift from Campbelltown's sister city Koshigaya in Japan.

=== Fisher's Ghost Festival ===
The Fisher's Ghost Festival is an annual festival held in recognition of Frederick Fisher, an emancipated convict who owned farming land in Campbelltown. Legend has it that Fisher appeared to local man John Farley as a ghost after being murdered by George Worrall, his friend and neighbour, over a land dispute. An annual parade through Campbelltown's main street, Queen Street, is held each November, and a carnival including fairground rides and other entertainment is held at Bradbury Oval, a local sports ground. Over a period of two weeks many activities take place, including the Fisher's Ghost Fun Run, the Fisher's Ghost Art Award and the Street Party which was formerly known as the Mardi Gras.

=== Media ===
Campbelltown is home to two local radio stations, 2MCR and C91.3FM. The two local newspapers are the Campbelltown-Macarthur Advertiser and the Macarthur Chronicle.

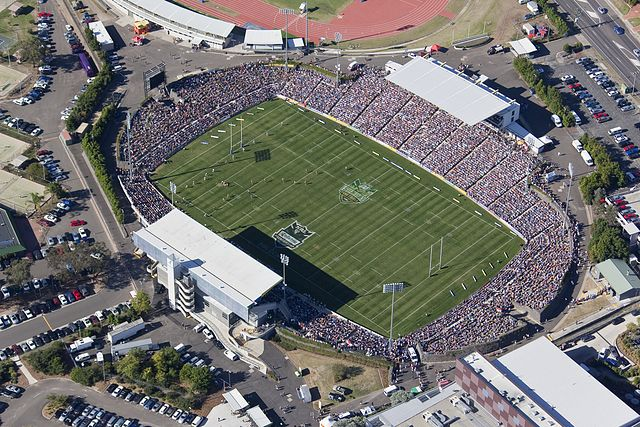
Campbelltown Sports Stadium from above

== Sport and recreation ==
Campbelltown is well known for its strong sporting culture. This includes Rugby League, Cricket, Athletics, Soccer and Australian Rules Football. Campbelltown has produced many professional athletes who have represented Australia at Olympic level.

Its leading sporting team is the Wests Tigers who play in the National Rugby League competition. The Wests Tigers are a merger of two foundation clubs of the old New South Wales Rugby League premiership, the Western Suburbs Magpies and the Balmain Tigers. As such, they play some of their home games at Campbelltown Stadium in neighbouring Leumeah and others at Leichhardt Oval in Sydney's Inner West. The Magpies still exist as a stand-alone team in the lower-tier competition, the New South Wales Cup, and play home games at Campbelltown Stadium.

Macarthur FC played their first season in the A-League Men in late 2020, after they were awarded a license under the name "Macarthur South-West Sydney" in December 2018 as part of the league's expansion. The club will play their home games at Campbelltown Stadium.

Another tenant of Campbelltown Stadium is the Macarthur Rams soccer team which plays in the New South Wales Premier League competition. Campbelltown is represented in the Sydney Grade Cricket competition by the Campbelltown-Camden Ghosts who play their home games in Raby and in the Sydney AFL's Premier Division, by the Campbelltown Blues who play their home games in Macquarie Fields. The Campbelltown District Netball Association, based in Minto, plays in the third division of the Netball NSW State League.

Campbelltown Billabong Parklands, a large 4 hectare recreation area with outdoor swimming pools and parkland, opened in 2024 at Apex Park.
