= Beulah, Gilead =

Beulah
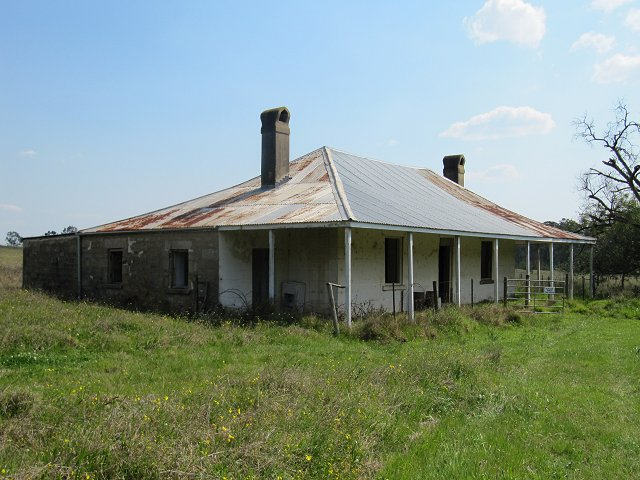

- Location within New South Wales Location within Australia
- 34°08′26″S 150°46′53″E
- Location: 767 Appin Road, Gilead, City of Campbelltown, New South Wales, Australia

History
- Built: 1835–1846

New South Wales Heritage Register
- Official name: Beulah; Summer Hill; Summer Hill Estate
- Type: State heritage (landscape)
- Designated: 2 April 1999
- Reference no.: 368
- Type: Historic Landscape
- Category: Landscape – Cultural
- Builders: Cornelius O'Brien, Duncan Cameron, John Kennedy Hume, Ellen Hume; Mansfield Brothers (1884 works)

Beulah is a heritage-listed farm at 767 Appin Road, Gilead, New South Wales, an outer suburb of Sydney, Australia in the Macarthur region. It was built from 1835 to 1846 by Cornelius O'Brien, Duncan Cameron, John Kennedy Hume, Ellen Hume; Mansfield Brothers (1884 works). It is also known as Summer Hill; Summer Hill Estate. The property is privately owned. It was added to the New South Wales State Heritage Register on 2 April 1999.

== History ==
=== Early land grants and occupation (1811–1835) ===
The modern community of Appin celebrated the bicentenary of European settlement in May 2011, taking its foundation date as 1811 from the first land grants given to European settlers: 405 hectares (1,000 acres) given to Acting Commissary William Broughton (Lachlan Vale) and 81 hectares (200 acres) to Broughton's brother-in-law John Kennedy (Teston), both grants dated 22 May 1811. Four further grants were made on 25 August 1812: 506 hectares (1,250 acres) to Alexander Riley (Elladale); 162 hectares (400 acres) to Reuben Uther (Mount Gilead); 40 hectares (100 acres) to Andrew Hamilton Hume; and 24 hectares (60 acres) to George Best. Riley, Uther and Hume were all free settlers and Hume was connected by marriage to both Broughton and Kennedy. George Best was a former convict.

By 1813 there was an established farming community at Appin. When a subscription was taken up at Liverpool in July of that year to support the building of a courthouse at Sydney, 14 of the 81 subscribers were listed as residents of Appin. These residents were a mixture of free arrivals, former soldiers and former convicts. Several small grants to former convicts were issued in the next few years. Large landholders like William Broughton and Alexander Riley received additional large grants in 1816–1817 and both John Kennedy and Andrew Hamilton Hume received smaller additional grants in 1816. Hume's eldest son, Hamilton Hume, also received land in that year.

The four original Crown grants which today comprise the historic property known as Beulah were promised between 1814 and 1820. These four grants became parish portions 71, 77, 78 and 79, with the farmhouse now called Beulah built on portion 78 (Parish of Menangle (formerly Manangle).

Portion 78, 16 hectares (40 acres), was granted to an Irish convict named Connor, or Cornelius, Bryan [Brien] from Clonmel, County Tipperary, transported for life on the Atlas 2 in 1802, aged 34. By 1806 he was assigned to Lieutenant William Minchin of the NSW Corps. [Minchin was also from Tipperary]. In June 1809 Bryan received a Conditional Pardon from Lieutenant-Governor William Paterson, acting governor of NSW in the wake of the arrest of Governor William Bligh in 1808. Bryan was obliged to surrender his Conditional Pardon in February 1810 following the arrival of the new governor, Lachlan Macquarie. In February 1810 he petitioned for its confirmation, declaring that he had spent most of his sentence in New South Wales as a servant of the government, and describing himself as an aged man who had left a wife and six children in Ireland to bewail his absence. He eventually received an Absolute Pardon in February 1812.

By 1814 Bryan was living at Liverpool where, from May that year, he had the services of assigned servant, Connor Boland, another Irish convict, newly arrived in New South Wales. Bryan's name was on a list of persons permitted by Governor Macquarie to become free settlers and to receive a grant of land in 1814. He was recommended for 12 hectares (30 acres), the standard grant for a single man with no dependants.

Portion 79, 20 hectares (50 acres), was promised to Patrick Pendergast [Pendergrass/Prendergast] in January 1816. Pendergast was also Irish, from County Sligo, transported for life on the Britannia in 1797. He was allocated 20 hectares (50 acres) in acknowledgement of his status as a married man.

Portion 71, 12 hectares (30 acres), was promised to a Second Fleet convict named Henry Sears [Sayers/Seers] in September 1818.

Portion 77, 32 hectares (80 acres), was granted to 18 year old colonial-born Francis Rawdon Hume, youngest son of Andrew Hume of Hume Mount, Appin. Hume jnr petitioned for land in May 1820, his petition supported by the local magistrates who declared him to be 'an honest, sober and most industrious young man. As shown on the original crown grant, Hume called his property Humewood.

Although none of these grants were formalised by an actual delivery of deeds until 1823, Bryan and Pendergast were almost certainly in occupation of their land by sometime in 1816 when both men supplied quantities of fresh meat to government stores.

Deputy Surveyor James Meehan's formal survey of the grants also seems to post-date occupation. Meehan's survey notebook has an entry for 6 February 1817 recording the marking out of 20 hectares (50 acres) for "Pat Pendergast" and an unspecified number of acres for "Cornelius Bryan". When the grants were issued on 30 June 1823 Bryan's grant was recorded as 16 hectares (40 acres).

In September 1831 both Bryan's and Pendergast's grants were re-gazetted, during a period in which Surveyor-General Mitchell had decided to tidy up paperwork around lands, presumably on the assumption that these grants had never been issued. It was in this second issue of the grant that Bryan's name was transmuted to Cornelius Ryan, an error that has led earlier historians of Beulah to misidentify the original grantee of this parcel of land and lose the thread of the history of the land ownership.

=== The Irish story ===
By 1831 Connor Bryan had long since left the colony, the first to return home in what became a rite of passage for a series of Irishmen associated with Beulah. This aspect of Beulah's history is a challenge to the orthodoxy around Irish convicts in Australia: the assumption that they were literally transported for life.

In April 1817 'Cornelius O'Bryan' announced in the Sydney Gazette that he was "leaving by an early opportunity" and requested all claims to be presented forthwith. On 26 November 1817, on the eve of his departure, he had a Letter of Attorney drawn up, giving authority to his assigned servant Connor Boland and to a man named Thomas Connell to cultivate his farm during his absence. In this document Bryan refers to his "thirty acres", declaring that it had been marked out for him by Mr James Meehan and that he had already cleared 16 acres. Boland was to collect the deeds from the Colonial Secretary's Office when they were ready and he and Connell were to look after Bryan's interests in any way they thought proper and deliver up the farm to him on his return to the colony. He sailed for London on the Harriet in December 1817.

Thomas Connell was one of Connor Bryan's shipmates on the Atlas 2 and also from Clonmel in County Tipperary. He was younger than Bryan, aged 19 when he was convicted and transported for life. In 1817 he petitioned for a mitigation of sentence and was granted a Conditional Pardon.

Connor, or Cornelius, Boland was assigned to Connor Bryan soon after his arrival in New South Wales. He had been tried in County Galway in March 1813, sentenced to life for uttering forged notes, along with a man named Denis O'Brien. They were both labourers from County Clare, Boland aged 28 and his mate aged 26. They were transported on the Three Bees, arriving in Sydney in May 1814 and sent straight to Liverpool for distribution: Denis O'Brien assigned to a man called William Day and Boland assigned to Connor Bryan.

Assignment to Bryan was a lucky break for Boland. The accumulated evidence of many small references – in colonial newspapers, census returns and in the NSW CSC – suggest that Boland was a man of energy and ambition. Not ambition for political or public office but an ambition to prosper. For Boland, Bryan's power of attorney was a catalyst for an entrepreneurial colonial career. Within weeks of Bryan's departure Boland petitioned for a Ticket of Leave and in July 1820 he and Denis O'Brien both received conditional pardons on the recommendation of Captain Francis Allman of the 48th Regiment. Allman, it seems, knew them both in Ireland, O'Brien from his childhood. Boland had been an Allman family servant in Ireland.

In August 1820 Boland made his first land purchase, buying the 12-hectare (30-acre) grant adjoining Connor Bryan's grant to the north, the land originally granted to Henry Sears (portion 71). Sears had sold his grant to one Thomas Colligan in February 1819 and Boland purchased the property from Colligan (Original deeds, unregistered, in collection of Caroline Simpson Library & Research Collection). In November 1822 both Boland and O'Brien petitioned for "a grant of land and a few cattle", each "having a few of his own", and in August 1823, again in concert, they sought land to depasture their cattle.

Their petitions were endorsed by Francis Allman and they were both given permission to select 121 hectares (300 acres) on Tickets of Occupation. By January 1824 Boland had selected an unoccupied spot of forest called Ferrah [Fairy] Meadow in the Illawarra. O'Brien had chosen a tract of land at Illawarra called "Bullseye" lying under a mountain. Boland's cattle were branded on the off hip with the letters CB and were to be placed under the charge of an Irish convict named Patrick Teefy [Teafy] who had arrived per the ship Brampton in 1823. O'Brien's cattle were marked DB.CB on the off hip – and also under the charge of Patrick Teefy.

Around this time Denis O'Brien bought Patrick Pendergast's grant, 20 hectares (50 acres) adjoining Connor Bryan's grant on the west (portion 79). Pendergast had sold his grant to Sydney merchant Daniel Cooper in July 1822.

Between them Boland and O'Brien had 49 hectares (120 acres) at Appin and in June 1824 they again petitioned for a grant of land, again in identical terms, again endorsed by Allman. They each declared that they had been able to purchase a few acres of land, which they had been busy cultivating and had secured through their industry and perseverance some cattle and horses, but the small amount of land now occupied by each was "much too limited" to allow them to maintain themselves by cultivation and to support the stock in their possession. They were each promised 24 hectares (60 acres). But Boland clearly had hoped for a larger grant and a few months later he submitted another memorial declaring that his purchased farm at Appin was too small and that he had the means to cultivate a large farm. He had 4 assigned convicts, Patrick Teefy being one of them, as well as a man named John Teefy. Boland was allowed an additional 57 hectares (140 acres).

But far from sitting quietly at home in Appin, cultivating his small farm, Boland was moving around the colony, dealing in cattle and horses. He was, for example, at Port Macquarie in September 1823. Captain Francis Allman was Commandant at Port Macquarie at that time and Boland was almost certainly exploiting his connection to Allman, a man with a reputation for sympathy for his fellow humanity, "always anxious to encourage the enterprising, and reward the industrious".

In December 1824 Allman was appointed commandant at Newcastle, becoming magistrate there in 1826. He was also a substantial landowner in the Hunter by 1825 and in early 1827 resigned his civil appointment to become a full-time settler on a property called Rathluba at Wallis Plains (Maitland), while maintaining other property interests at Muswellbrook, including a property called Overton. Boland turned up there too. Years later Allman declared that he had kept Boland's cattle and horses on his estate on the Hunter and that he had subsidized Boland's stockbreeding, paying for the services of entire horses for the many mares kept by Boland on Allman's farm.

It seems likely that Boland had delegated his interests at Appin and Illawarra to his assigned servants and his shipmate Denis O'Brien while he was building up his holdings of cattle and horses in the Hunter. Thomas Connell might also have been working for Boland at Appin at this time. Boland travelled between Appin and the Hunter in the late 1820s. He wrote from Appin to the Colonial Secretary in September 1826, applying for an additional grant of land but he was probably back in the Hunter in 1827 when a "Return of Government servants left by themselves without any overseer or other person to superintend them in the District of Illawarra" lists Boland's name in relation to two men, John Moran and Patrick Teefy. Teefy, it seems, had been "a considerable time without any overseer, now about at some other place with cattle but is to return".

The November 1828 census shows both Boland and Patrick Teefy together with Allman at the Hunter, Boland listed as an overseer for Allman, possibly at Overton, while Patrick Teefy was listed as a stockman at Rathluba. Denis O'Brien is shown in the November 1828 census at Appin with four assigned servants including John Teefy. It seems reasonable to assume that he was also looking after both his and Boland's interests in the Illawarra. Thomas Connell had left Appin by 1828 and gone down to the Goulburn Plains, like many of the free settlers from Appin.

There is evidence of a strong network of patronage and obligation operating between Boland, the Irish convicts associated with him, and Captain Francis Allman. In January 1830 Boland's former assigned servant Patrick Teefy, sentence expired, wrote to the Colonial Secretary asking for land. He made the interesting claim that he has spent the entire period of his deportation working for Francis Allman. Allman endorsed his petition saying that Teefy has been in charge of his cattle for several years. Teefy has also managed to get together £150 in cash which he had deposited in the hands of Allman. Although Teefy waxed lyrical (or maudlin) in his petition ? claiming that he had "arrived at the middle standard of life with an increasing desire to honestly and industriously exert himself to enable his heavy charge of a wife and 7 children to join and give effect to his labours in the Colony for the good of his neglected offspring; enabling them to cooperate with him in adopting this country as their future abode in the path of honesty and as dutiful and faithful citizens" ? his plea fell on deaf ears. Twelve months later both Patrick Teefy and John Teefy left the colony in a ship called the Nancy. Two more Irishmen with associations to Beulah who had managed to find the means to return home.

Boland, still at Maitland in 1831, asked for a town grant, declaring that he was engaged in farming and agricultural pursuits, and wished to build a house for occasional residence. He had the means, £1,000 in cash, as well as land and stock. His request was unsuccessful and he left the Hunter around 1832, as did Francis Allman who sold up much of his property there and re-entered the public service as Police Magistrate for the Illawarra in September 1832.

In July 1834 Boland and O'Brien were granted absolute pardons. Royal Approval was given in December 1834 and the pardons were gazetted in Sydney in July 1835. By December 1835 they had sold their Illawarra farms. They had named these after localities in County Clare: Ballyvally was Boland's choice, Killestry was O'Brien's, both localities near Killaloe.

In September 1836 Boland put his Appin property on the market, including the 20 hectares (50 acres) that Denis O'Brien had bought that had once been Pendergast's. It was advertised as:

'a valuable abundantly watered farm, in the district of Appin; ...120 acres, cleared & stumped except a few acres left for firewood; 5 paddocks besides a kitchen garden and orchard; ...lately erected a well finished substantial stone house, containing a verandah, passage, 8 good rooms and an attic story over the whole, fit for storage of any kind or servants' apartments; also a good barn, stabling, and substantial huts for men; 6 miles from Campbelltown and 4 from Appin.'

He was also selling the crop, consisting of 17 hectares (41 acres) of wheat and 6.1 hectares (15 acres) of oats, either with the farm or separate. "The furniture is modern and good, and may be taken at a valuation, as the Proprietor is leaving the Colony.". Further particulars could be got from Boland on the premises and from Francis Allman who had become Police Magistrate at Campbelltown in 1836.

In March 1837 Boland sold his stock, 250 head of "very superior mixed cattle", at auction in Campbelltown and in April the property – called Summerhill at that time – was sold, with Francis Allman witness to the conveyance. Boland went home to Ireland where he died in March 1839, at the home of his widowed sister Mary Sullivan in Limerick. In his will he left significant sums of money to his sisters and various nephews and nieces including a niece named Margaret Crowe. He also declared that Captain Francis Allman owed him £800 (plus interest) and he empowered his niece Margaret Crowe to call in that debt, precipitating a chain of events that bankrupted Allman and forced his resignation from the magistracy.

In tendering his resignation to Governor Gipps in April 1844 Allman provided an account of his relationship to Boland. He explained that:

On my landing with my regiment in this colony in the year 1818 as a captain in the 48th Regt I found an old servant of my family in Ireland named Conor Bolan. I procured his conditional pardon (for he was then a convict for life). I subsequently set him up as a small settler, and for eight years kept his cattle and horses on my estate on the Hunter's river, and paying during that period not only for the requisition [of] Servants but also for the services of Entire horses for the many mares kept during this time on my Farm, he himself living during all this time with me free of expence.

About six years back he found himself possessed of about £5,000, and having at that time obtained an absolute pardon he went home taking the sum before mentioned with him with the exception of £600 which he insisted on leaving at my disposal with the perfect understanding that it was to be my property should he not return to the colony. I reluctantly accepted of this sum, on his own condition, and also gave him an order on my agents in London for a sum of £220 which sum he promised to remit to my family in goods from London. Bolan died of drunkenness shortly after landing among his friends but not before, as it appears, leaving all his property to the person who has since sued me here.

Allman's account is naturally partisan. There can be no doubt that his sponsorship played a pivotal role in the success of Boland's colonial career but Boland's first break was provided by Connor Bryan's power of attorney and Boland himself was also an agent in his own success. Horse-breeding was one of the keys to his prosperity, almost certainly generating more income for Boland than farming. Allman's reference to paying for "the services of Entire horses for the many mares" Boland kept on Allman's estate on the Hunter is one indication of this. Another is the advertisement for a lost horse which appeared in the colonial press in June 1839, after Boland's death in Ireland. The ad describes the horse as 'bred by Connor Baldwin and Dennis O'Brien of Appin'.

==== The establishment of Summer Hill (later Beulah), c. 1835–46 ====
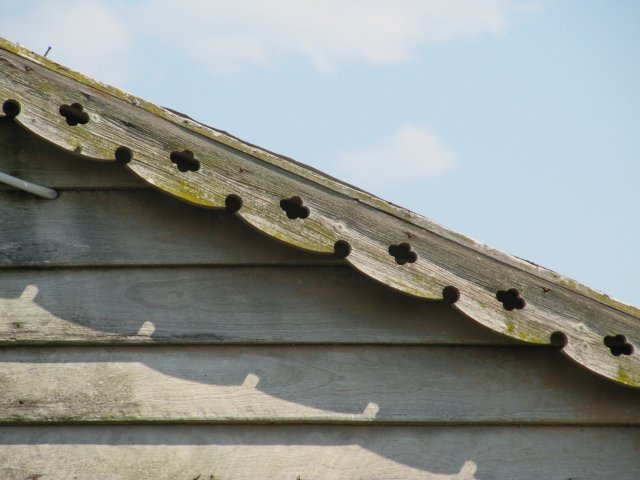
Decorative bargeboards

When Boland advertised his farm for sale in September 1836 the house was described as "a well-finished stone house" that had "lately been erected". We know from Allman's testimony to Gipps, and from Boland's 1831 application for a town grant in Maitland on which to build a house, that he had by that time accumulated a significant amount of capital. The quick succession of sales of property and stock following his receipt of an Absolute Pardon in 1834 suggest that, having made up his mind to go home to Ireland, he set about the construction of the house as a means to maximise the value of his assets.

A farmhouse had existed on Connor Bryan's grant for many years prior to the construction of the new stone house. In September 1824 the Appin constables certified that the farm, then in the occupation of Boland's assigned convict servant Patrick Teefy, had ';a good House, and logg'd Barn, with outhouses'. Henry Sears' grant also had 'good logg'd house', occupied by John Noonan, a convict assigned to Denis O'Brien. The improvements on Connor Bryan's grant were clearly more substantial than those on Sears' and it seems probable that this house became the main residence on the consolidated Boland property, possibly occupying the same site as the later house but no information has been uncovered about the actual construction of the later house.

Sometime in the early 1830s the consolidated property acquired the name Summer Hill. It was listed under that name in the New South Wales Calendar and General Post Office Directory for 1834 as the address of Denis O'Brien. The listing was repeated in the 1835, 1836 and 1837 editions of the directory (which ceased publication with the 1837 edition). Summer Hill was sold to a gentleman from Parramatta named Duncan Cameron in April 1837 in two simultaneous transactions: Connor Bryan's 40 acres and Henry Sears' 30 acres were sold by Boland as one parcel for £500. Patrick Pendergast's 50 acres was sold by Denis O'Brien for £275.

Cameron did not hold the property long, putting it back on the market in March 1839, but the description of the place in Cameron's advertisement was couched in slightly different terms to that given in Boland's advertisement of April 1837. Boland was selling a farm while Cameron was pitching a "handsome homestead". Cameron placed emphasis on the genteel nature of the property, stating that the house had been built within the last four years and being in full repair was "fit for the immediate reception of a respectable family". The house was described as "a stone and lime edifice". Boland's "eight good rooms" had become Cameron's "eight apartments, consisting of a parlour, a dining room, a drawing room and four bed rooms".

More significantly, Cameron's advertisement declared that there was "a substantially stone built kitchen, newly erected behind the house, with a commodious fire place and servants" bed room' and also stated that the house was "approached by a noble avenue from the public road leading to Illawarra'. This latter reference may provide a clue to the troublesome question of the date of the construction of the stone bridge over Woodhouse Creek.

==== Leases and occupations/uses ====
One other interesting detail of Cameron's 1839 advertisement for Summer Hill is reference to the fact that no grain had been sown on the farm since 1837. Neither's Boland's sale in April 1837, nor Cameron's in August 1839 brought a new owner occupier. It seems that the property was not actively farmed for some years after Boland's departure.

Instead there were a series of tenants, only a handful of whom have been identified. For a short time in 1838/1839 it was leased to young Scottish immigrant, graduate of the University of Glasgow and journalist James McEachern. He announced in The Colonist in September 1838 that he had opened a private boys' boarding school '...in the District of Appin, on the Farm of Summerhill, which, from its beautiful and sequestered situation, its commodious house, excellent garden, and other advantages, is particularly suited for the purpose to which it is now applied '. As Mr McE's mother superintends his domestic affairs the general arrangements of the Establishment will be rendered as nearly as possible similar to those of a family; and Parents may therefore rest assured, that no reasonable trouble or expense shall be spared to promote the comfort and improvement of those who may become pupils at Summerhill'.

The school probably operated for only two terms. In January 1839 The Colonist ran an editorial announcing the school would re-open on 10 January when McEachern, through some unspecified "recent arrangements" that he had made, would be able to accommodate a larger number of boarders than hitherto: Under the domestic management of Mrs. McE, together with the substantial comforts derivable from the farm, with its dairy and excellent garden, we should think that the Summerhill Academy ought to be one of the most eligible establishments for the education of youth in the southern districts of the colony.

Two months later the property was again on the market. In August 1839 it sold to Lachlan Macalister for £800. Macalister was a former Captain in the 48th Regiment (like Francis Allman) who had served for some years as a Lieutenant of the NSW Mounted Police. He had substantial pastoral interests in the southern districts of NSW as well as an estate called Clifton at Picton.

In January 1840 Macalister let Summer Hill for six months to a newly arrived Scottish settler named Archibald Cuninghame. Cuninghame was a young man aged 29, heir to an estate in Ayrshire. He had come to the Australian colonies with his elder sisters Christina and Sarah and his younger brother John on a colonial adventure, looking to invest in a grazing property. He rented Summer Hill as a place to domicile his entourage, which included four servants, while he scouted the "different quarters of the colony' for a suitable property. Cuninghame did not farm at Summer Hill but bought sufficient sheep to provide mutton for the household, as well as a couple of milch cows. He also bought three brood mares and a saddle-mare, having learnt soon after his arrival that "horse trading pays excellently here". His sister Sarah established a kitchen garden and kept chickens.

Both Archibald and Sarah left detailed descriptions of the house. Archibald's account was contained in a letter to his mother in Scotland, written from Sydney on 21 January 1840:

'The cottage is not fine or elegantly laid out but it is substantial and of stone, the sitting room and girls' bedroom are both good rooms and tho' Jack and I are in little places eight or nine feet wide it is better than nine-tenths of the settlers have. Rintoul has a similar space. Heard and Robert sleep in the loft and I have a spare room in case a couple come for me in the "James Turcan"... there is a wooden farm building standing, tho' in disrepair, where I have arranged stables, loose boxes for my imported horse and mare, both of whom are in good health, a house for the poultry, besides other odd places.'

Archibald's description of the sleeping arrangements at Summer Hill suggest that he and his brother John and the servant Rintoul each had one of the four verandah rooms, the fourth of which must have been the "spare room" that he was reserving for prospective additional employees. The other male servants shared the loft but Archibald made no reference to the fourth servant, a maid-of-all-work named Charlotte who also had with her a young daughter called Nancy.

Sarah Cuninghame makes frequent reference to Charlotte and Nancy in the daily diary that she kept during January–February 1840. She describes the house and its setting and the neighbourhood as if she were writing a series of letters to her mothers and sisters in Scotland and begins her description on the morning after their arrival at Summer Hill:

'We have a small open field in front of brown withered looking grass, beyond is bush but just opposite our door there has been an opening and a road made which gives something the air of an approach. We are enclosed by a neat white paling with a gate. In the centre of the enclosure in front there is a mound covered with weeds & a few of the commonest scarlet geraniums. Round this there is a gravelled path surrounded by a circle of grass – rather greener than the common, then a gravelled road broad enough for a carriage to drive round – corners of grass to fill up the square & beyond on each side a little piece of orchard ground with quantities of weeds large & small, & peach, apricot, nectarine & two little fig trees. On a few of the trees there is a good deal of fruit not quite ripe. Behind there is a kitchen garden, a wilderness of disorder, but nearly lost among the weeds we have discovered a pretty good supply of potatoes and cabbages and a few peas & French beans rather too old for use, but this is a great addition to our provision'.... '& now for the interior of our habitation – on the left hand side as we enter is the parlour, a small room with white washed walls, a brick chimney with no grate & uncarpeted. It is furnished with our book case & celerette, the four cabin chairs & the table on which the bookcase stood in our cabin which now serves as our dining table & will allow of six people sitting round it. Opposite is our bedroom, about the same size, its furniture consists of trunks innumerable, our washing stand & chest of drawers & the mattress on the floor. There are several rooms behind & a loft for the servants & a kitchen with an oven outside, also an apartment which must serve in the double capacity of washhouse & store room. Shelves, presses or hooks there are none except one very small press in Charlotte's room so our poor bookcase is degraded to the office of keeping tumblers & glasses & spoons with sundry other articles more useful than ornamental.'

As the household faced up to the challenge of their first Australian summer Sarah observed that:

'The verandah is the greatest comfort & keeps the rooms in a delightful temperature. Tho' they are certainly neither large nor lofty I have never felt them overheated. It is also an excellent pacing place in wet days & a shelter when the sun shines, tho' sometimes hotter there than the rooms. It has no creeping plants or flowers upon it but is supported by small wooden pillars painted white & looks rather neat.'

The Cuninghame sisters had been to visit the Macarthurs at Camden Park – Archibald had a letter of introduction to James Macarthur ?- and Sarah had seen the potential value of climbing plants:

'The Camden drawing room opens onto a verandah behind the house & the first thing which caught my eye was a most splendid climbing plant'. Their verandah was the only pretty one we have seen here & it was beautiful, covered with flowering plants which were trained from one pillar to another & the one which we had remarked from the drawing room was a native with a very elegant leaf & covered with large bunches of pale pink large & delicate looking flowers – a sort of Bignonia (I think). It was a splendid looking plant.'... 'This afternoon we went to see a very large aloe tree in flower about a quarter of a mile from this beside an old broken house. It is a very singular looking plant, you know the leaf of the aloe but here it is very much larger & stronger in its way of growing. From the middle of a very large bush of these leaves there rises a long straight stem, quite a little tree, and at the top covered with very large bunches or rather branches of curious looking yellow flowers. We saw two others of the same kind growing beside a cottage, but I suppose they are all planted here.'

It is clear from the words "I suppose they are all planted here" that Sarah Cuninghame knew that the aloe was not native to New South Wales but her description points to the fact that they were a notable feature of the colonial landscape.

In July 1840 the Cuninghames left Summer Hill for Melbourne and the district of Port Phillip. The next known tenant of Summer Hill was a man named George Bonnor who took up a six month lease of the farm at the beginning of July 1842 but was declared insolvent in mid-January 1843, owing Macalister the full rent of £42/10s. Bonnor was never a likely farmer. He had been a commission agent in England before becoming bankrupt in 1839 and he had left England in 1840 under an assumed name (Brown) to escape his creditors.

Bonnor's schedule of assets on his farm at Appin was extremely modest: various farming implements; about zero point four zero hectares (one acre) of potatoes; a horse, cart and harness; one hen and chickens; a kitchen table; a mattress; a quantity of casks; and wearing apparel for himself, his wife and his child. Not much for a man who styled himself "farmer". But he was hardly a reliable witness and was certainly hiding assets. Indeed, three years later his neighbour Francis Rawdon Hume revealed in a notice published in The Sydney Morning Herald that Bonnor had left cattle on Hume's farm Rockwood at the beginning of 1843 – on the eve of the sequestration of his estate.

Bonnor might have been Macalister's last tenant at Summer Hill. In May 1843 Macalister sold the property to Henry Harvey and Benjamin Lee from Parramatta, recouping his outlay of £800. Two years later, in March 1845, Harvey and Lee conveyed the property to Helenus Scott of Glendon in the Hunter River district, as part of a complicated settlement of debts. In 1842 Harvey and Lee had got themselves into financial difficulties with Robert Scott, brother of Helenus when they entered into a bond with Scott which guaranteed the repayment of certain monies Scott had lent to Duncan Cameron. Cameron defaulted on repayment of this money – £6,600 – in January 1844. After Robert Scott's death in July 1844 proceedings were taken against Harvey and Lee by Helenus Scott as executor and sole beneficiary of his brother's estate. The proceedings were abandoned by mutual agreement on the conveyance of the Appin property. It was a very small offset against the bad debt but the colony was then still feeling the consequences of the severe economic depression which had affected all the Australian colonies in the early 1840s.

Scott put the property up for auction in Sydney in June 1845. The auction notice declared that "Summer Hill Farm" was entirely "stumped and free for the plough from one end to the other". In addition to a cottage (no longer a 'handsome homestead'!) with dining and drawing rooms, four verandah rooms, detached kitchen and laundry, the improvements included a 'moderate sized barn, men's huts, stables' and "a large tank". The reference to a large tank in this context is a reference to a dam, probably intended to hold water for livestock (The 1833 edition of the New South Wales Calendar and General Post Office Directory notes that Thomas Rose who then owned Mount Gilead, the property to the north of Summer Hill, had been 'the first to construct a tank sufficiently capacious to secure him from the want of water in dry seasons'). Summer Hill was offered as a property that was "desirable as either a country residence for any party desirous of living away from the city, yet within a comfortable drive of it, or, as a dairy or agricultural farm". Interestingly, although offered as 49 hectares (120 acres), it was described as actually being 53 hectares (132 acres) – the discrepancy explained by the creek "having been roughly surveyed as a straight line".

In August 1846 the three original grants of 16, 12 and 20 hectares (40, 30 and 50 acres), (collectively known as the Summer Hill Estate), were conveyed to "John Kennedy Hume of Appin, Gentleman" for £300. John Kennedy Hume was the six-year old son of Francis Rawdon Hume and his wife Emma Mitchell. He was born at Rockwood, the Hume family estate at Appin, on 24 April 1840.

=== The Hume story (1846–1936) ===
==== The first Appin property – Hume Mount / Humewood / Rockwood ====
Andrew Hume's original 1812 grant of 40 hectares (100 acres) was called Hume Mount. His additional grant of 20 hectares (50 acres) received in 1816 adjoined this land and over the next twenty years both Andrew Hume and his son Francis Rawdon Hume extended the estate by buying adjoining grants so that by 1827 Hume Mount totalled more than 121 hectares (300 acres) (NSW Land & Property Information: RPA 12539). Other Hume land at Appin included Francis Rawdon Hume's own 1823 grant of 32 hectares (80 acres), which adjoined his father's land on the north-east, and Hamilton Hume's 162 hectares (400 acres) in the same area. Hamilton's property was called Brookdale and included 121 hectares (300 acres) that he had been granted as a reward for his services in exploring new country beyond the Yass Plains. John Kennedy Hume, Andrew Hume's second son, had an 32-hectare (80-acre) grant, which he called Hillsborough Farm, less than a mile to the north of his brother Rawdon's grant.

Hamilton Hume received additional large grants of 518 and 777 hectares (1,280 and 1,920 acres) in reward for further exploration, choosing to establish properties on the Yass Plains. By the late 1820s many colonists were confident that the financial rewards promised by pastoralism were much greater than those provided by agriculture. All of the Hume brothers were looking for pastoral land in the new southern districts, the districts that had been partially opened up by the explorations of Hamilton Hume. For his part, John Kennedy Hume may have had an additional motivation for moving south. In 1825 he had married Elizabeth O'Neill, step-daughter of Patrick Pendergast of Appin, a marriage contracted in secret, in opposition to the wishes of his family. He established a property near Gunning.

In October 1826 Francis Rawdon Hume had applied for an additional "grant of land without purchase", declaring that he had built "a substantial dwelling house of four rooms, with a verandah &c;" as well as a servants' house and a stable on his existing grant of 32 hectares (80 acres). He also declared that 24 hectares (60 acres) of the grant was in a state of cultivation and that he had 75 head of horned cattle, two horses and other stock. He had erected a three-railed fence around nearly all of his land and had employed and maintained three convict servants off the government stores for the previous year.

Rawdon Hume's application was supported by two referees, one of whom was Thomas Rose, a Sydney innkeeper who was at that time owner of the adjoining property Mt Gilead. Rose attested that he knew that Hume had built a dwelling house and had brought a great portion of his land into cultivation. The other referee, Sydney flour-miller Thomas Barker, was careful to say that he had not seen Hume's farm for two years but felt confident that it would be in good order since Francis Rawdon Hume was "an industrious, good farmer" who brought "superior quality, well-cleaned" wheat for sale to Sydney.

Hume's referees were not particularly concerned about the details of Francis Rawdon Hume's improvements on his grant. They had been asked to testify as to his means, to confirm that he had sufficient surplus capital to invest in additional property should he be granted such land. Although there is no indication that Francis Rawdon Hume received an additional grant in response to his 1826 application, there is some evidence that he was already running cattle on a property in the County of Argyle by late 1826.

In February 1827 Francis Rawdon Hume advertised Hume Mount and Humewood farms "to be let for a term of five years." The advertisement confirms that F. R. Hume's original grant was named Humewood but, in the event, the farms were not let. Instead there was some re-arrangement of land occupation between F. R. Hume and his father. Andrew Hume went to live with his daughter Isabella Barber at Glenrock near Marulan but remained listed in the NSW Calendar and General Post Office Directory from 1832–7 as owning property at Appin called Humewood.

Francis Rawdon (F. R.) Hume settled in at Hume Mount which by 1828 he had renamed Rockwood. He married Emma Mitchell in 1830 and in June 1831 applied for additional land for his wife Emma as a marriage portion. The first of 14 children, a son Andrew Hamilton Hume, was born at Rockwood in May 1832. Although he had another go at letting Rockwood in December 1833, advertising it as suitable for "emigrants with families" and "well-adapted for agriculture with a run for a small dairy herd", F. R. Hume remained at Rockwood with his family until August 1846 when he sold up his furniture, implements, pigs, poultry, horses.

A correspondent called "Felix" wrote a letter ...regretting Hume's departure from "his fine estate of Rockwood for his establishment in the interior", declaring that Appin would feel the loss of "as good-hearted a man as ever breathed".

Francis Rawdon Hume bought Summer Hill in his son's name in the midst of packing up to leave Rockwood. Rockwood was let to a Mr Bayne but nothing is known of the arrangements at Summer Hill. Two years later, in September 1848 both Rockwood and Summer Hill were advertised as farms to let, "for such term of years as may be agreed upon".

Rockwood was described as containing about 202 hectares (500 acres), divided into twelve paddocks, with 'a commodious stone-built dwelling-house, containing a spacious hall, two large parlours, four bed-rooms, two large attics, cellar; with a snug four-room cottage attached, stone-built kitchen and store; large garden and orchard, stables, men's dwelling and other out-offices'.

Summer Hill was described as adjoining Rockwood and containing "upwards of 81 hectares (200 acres)", divided into five paddocks with "a substantial stone-built cottage, containing a hall, eight rooms, with attic, and having a detached stone-built kitchen. A shrubbery, enclosed by palisades, in front; large garden and orchard in the rear, and a large enclosed reservoir quite convenient to the dwelling".

==== Leases and occupations / uses ====
Few details are known of Francis Rawdon Hume's tenants at Summer Hill during the 1850s, 1860s and 1870s beyond some names listed in directories or electoral rolls. The Official Post Office Directory of New South Wales for 1867, for example, lists two farmers at Summer Hill, Appin: James Burke and James McGrath. Burke (or Bourke) is also listed as Francis Rawdon's tenant at Summer Hill in the electoral rolls for the district of Appin from 1869–1876.

At Rockwood the social status of the tenants was such that notices of marriages, or deaths, or the births of their children, might be published in the newspapers. Through such notices and family papers, we know the Clayton family took up residence at Rockwood c. 1855. The head of the household was Frances (Fanny) Matilda Clayton, widow of Dr Benjamin Clayton, late of Baltinglass, near Gunning. Fanny was a Broughton, daughter of Acting Commissary William Broughton, one of the original grantees of land at Appin. She was a cousin of F. R. Hume and his siblings.

The Claytons lived at Rockwood for nearly twenty years, apparently on a succession of five-year leases. A surviving memorandum of agreement' relating to the tenancy, dated 1 February 1860, suggests that by that time management of Hume affairs at Rockwood had passed to Rawdon Hume's eldest son Andrew Hamilton Hume. Under the terms of this agreement Frances Matilda Clayton agreed to rent "the farm known as Rockwood consisting of about 400 acres" for five years at the rate of £40 per annum, agreeing also to spend £100 on shingling and repairing the house and £100 on erecting fences and clearing out waterholes.

The memorandum includes reference to James McGrath, tenant at Summer Hill, which suggests that there had been some permeability between the boundaries of Rockwood and Summer Hill. The document includes the following terms: "It is agreed between Mrs Clayton and James McGrath that those portions of the two farms taken from each other under the old leases shall remain so, for the first year of this lease".

The map which accompanies the memorandum indicates roughly the existing land use at Summer Hill at that time, showing the Pendergast grant as divided into a bush paddock and a cultivation paddock. The maps show two houses, one on Rockwood and one on Summer Hill. Confusingly, it also shows Rawdon Hume's 1823 grant as belonging to "J. K. Hume of Collingwood left him by his grandfather".

When Andrew Hamilton Hume senior made his will in January 1844 he devised 'to John Hume the infant son of my lamented late son John Hume who was barbarously murdered all that tract of land in Appin ... bounded on the north by Rose's land, on the east by the Appin Road, on the west by a creek running north, and on the south by an avenue leading to Rawdon Hume's house'. John Kennedy Hume, second son of Andrew Hamilton Hume, was murdered by a bushranger Thomas Whitton in Gunning in 1840. His son, also John Kennedy Hume, was born in 1840 and died in 1869). This description clearly matches the land granted to Rawdon Hume in 1823, but Andrew Hume's assumption that it is his own property and that he has the right to devise it to his grandson seems to confirm that this is the place called Humewood, listed as Andrew Hume's Appin address in the NSW Calendar and Post Office Directory of the 1830s when Francis Rawdon Hume was listed at Rockwood. Andrew Hume died in 1849 but his will was never probated. The puzzle is complicated by an annotation on the original crown grant for Humewood. In an unknown hand, it reads: 'Mr Charles Hume, one of F. R. Hume's sons, told me told me that this land was devised to J. K. Hume by F. R. Hume.'

Fanny Clayton had eight children, the eldest aged 19, the youngest just two years old (four sons and four daughters) when she took up Rockwood following her husband's death in September 1854. The family enjoyed a close friendship with near neighbours at Mt Gilead, Edmund Hume Woodhouse and his wife Gertrude. A scrap album kept by Gertrude includes a sketch of Rockwood and associated buildings drawn in October 1863.

Fanny Clayton's second daughter Emma Johnson Clayton was born at Gunning on 25 April 1843. Throughout her adult life she kept a diary. Her entry for January 1872 has reference to her future husband John Kennedy Hume: "All had a walk together to the aloes after tea. Had a little music this evening and played whist and bridge. Ben and J. K. H. at Mt. G." ('Ben' is a reference to Emma's brother Benjamin Clayton. "Mt. G" is Mt Gilead).

Emma married John Kennedy Hume at St Peter's Campbelltown on 19 February 1873. Edmund Hume Woodhouse was one of the trustees of her marriage settlement. Following their marriage they lived first at Forest Lodge, Goulburn, then Cooma Cottage near Yass. John Kennedy Hume inherited Cooma Cottage on his uncle's death in April 1873, as well as a property called Marchmont near Yass. John and Emma's first child, Ellen Clayton Hume, was born at Forest Lodge on 25 February 1874. A son named Hamilton was born at Yass in 1875 but died aged 14 months. A third child, another daughter, born in August 1882, lived barely a year. Following the death of this child John and Emma decided to return to Appin.

After the Claytons left Rockwood in the mid-1870s the property had tenants, including Mrs Gertrude Woodhouse who had decamped to Rockwood after her husband's death in 1875 when her eldest son had taken charge at Mt Gilead. At Rockwood she bred stud horses, prize-winning sheep and pigs, winning three silver medals at the Sydney International Exhibition of 1879, one for an Exmoor horse called Sir Thomas, one for a coarse-woolled Southdown ram and one for a coarse-woolled Southdown ewe. At the Agricultural Society's 1881 exhibition she won prizes for an old English Berkshire sow while another exhibitor won a prize for a Dartford Park sow bred by Mrs Woodhouse.

Mrs Woodhouse had a five-year lease on Rockwood but by the time John and Emma Hume returned to Appin John's eldest brother Andrew Hamilton Hume and his family were in residence.

=== Beulah (1884–1936) ===
John Kennedy Hume used Rockwood as a base during the first half of 1884 while he arranged to take over the occupation of Summer Hill. His tenants, a family called Murray, needed time to find alternative accommodation and he needed to make some repairs. It is clear from letters to his wife that they had decided to change the name to Beulah.

Beulah was a Hebrew word used in the Book of Isaiah as a prophesied attribute of the land of Israel and used in literature as the name of a mystical place, somewhere between Earth and Heaven. It was used in this way on John Bunyan's Pilgrim's Progress. John Kennedy Hume was an adherent of a group called the British Israelites whose doctrine was based on the hypothesis that people of British descent were direct lineal descendants of the ten lost tribes of Israel.

Some sense of what might have been the promise of Beulah for John and Emma is conveyed in a letter written by John from Rockwood to Emma in March 1884:

... the day is not far distant when we can come together, always, in love and happiness at Beulah. I was up betimes this morning and for over an hour enjoyed the delicious air on our future home'.

John engaged prominent Sydney architects Mansfield Brothers to carry our repairs and renovations to the cottage. Tenders were called in March. Hume may have chosen Mansfield as architect because he had a social acquaintance with him. George Allen Mansfield had a country house called Glen Lorne near Mt Gilead, just along the Appin Road.

There are no details of what repairs the architects were to carry out except reference to the old kitchen being cleared away and a foundation being laid for the new one. It seems probable the summer house was erected at this time, as a belvedere with sightlines to both Hume homes, Rockwood and Beulah. John was doing other work around the property: trenching, fencing – putting up a four-railed fence to keep things away from the house planting the garden. The house was "beginning to look something like new" by that time but the work was still not finished at the beginning of August when the radishes and cress had emerged.

John took up residence in late August and began furnishing the place, sending Emma a list of shopping for Sydney: a kitchen table, kerosene oil, crockery, kitchen lamp etc' Emma and Ellen joined him at Beulah before the end of the year and in December 1884 an alteration was made to the terms of Emma's marriage settlement whereby the trustees of the settlement were instructed to sell certain property in Yass and to invest the proceeds in the purchase of Beulah, "consisting of 49 hectares (120 acres) or thereabouts". By this arrangement she became owner of the Bryan, Sears and Pendergast grants, the property bought for John Kennedy Hume when he was six. John's father, Francis Rawdon Hume, was alive in 1884, living in retirement at Castlesteads near Boorowa. He died in 1888 leaving a will by which in a codicil made September 1882 he confirmed John Kennedy Hume's title to Summer Hill.

From Emma's diaries and correspondence of J. K. Hume, it seems they lived a quiet life at Beulah. Emma records the small daily routines: afternoon walks to the gate; in the creek in quest of ferns; to and reading in the summer house; walks in the Rockwood creek; sending an employee to cut chaff at Brookdale; getting the piano tuned; planting seeds of aster and pansy; the heifer calving; social visits to Brookdale and Glen Lorne; collecting eggs; John going to Campbelltown in the sulky; to Yass; selling a horse; getting a horse shod; catching 23 fish in the river; getting bamboo roots from Glen Lorne and planting them in the garden; killing a black snake in the bush above the bridge; the death of a cat; giving lemons to a neighbour; making apricot jam; gardening in the cool of the day. John's letters talk about buying hay for the cows and pumping water for cattle in drought. In the late 1880s he put in a new, deeper, dam some distance from the house, "over the hill".

John Hume died at Beulah in November 1905. An inventory of household effects itemised the furniture including dining room, four bedrooms, study, hall, man's room, bathroom, kitchen, office, verandah and bush house. His real estate comprised his 2,023-hectare (5,000-acre) Marchmont near Yass and 32 hectares (80 acres), parish portion 77, at Appin. He sold Cooma Cottage in 1904. The Appin land was described:

'This land consists of a forest in its natural state, timber principally spotted gum, some iron-bark, oak, box, and a little stringy-bark. The soil generally is of poor quality and shallow, the rock being very near to the surface. The frontage to the gully is very rocky and rough – The present value is principally for the timber contents. The only improvements on the land are the boundary fences on three sides, the gully on the west side being unfenced.'

Emma was John's sole beneficiary. Her diaries provide little detail of how she managed. She died at Beulah on 30 November 1919. A trained nurse, Jessie Clayton of Minto, witnessed the death. Jessie was Emma's niece. Emma's 32 hectares (80 acres) (portion 77) "well timbered natural forest" and the remaining 49 hectares (120 acres), Beulah noting residence, outbuildings of wood and/or iron, store room, bathroom, stable, feed room, coach-house, laundry, summer-house, labourer's cottage of two rooms, milking bails. Ellen Hume was sole beneficiary of her mother's estate. Few details are known of her life at Beulah in the years after her mother's death or of the management of her inheritance. Ellen was certainly in attendance at another Royal Australian Historical Society visit to the monument in March 1929. She was known to be interested in Hume family history.

A partial visual record of the house and its surrounds around the time of Emma's death is provided by a series of soft-focus, hand-coloured photographs taken by a studio photographer.

Ellen Hume and Beulah were featured in The Australian Home Beautiful in 1934 in an article by Nora Cooper, photographs by Harold Cazneaux and descriptions of Hume family furniture. The forest which Miss Hume treated as a private sanctuary – The Hume Sanctuary – received special attention. It was Ellen's wish that her trees be left to the nation. A photograph from 1934 indicates that the character of the spotted gum (Corymbia maculata) forest has remained constant. The garden close to the house was described as conforming to no special pattern:

"...but wanders around the house at its own sweet will, trailing after it a cloud of loveliness. All the old favourites are there: phlox and hollyhocks, larkspur, lemon-scented verbena, marigolds and lupins, cosmos so large that at a distance they look like asters, rhododendrons, Chatham Island lilies and another kind of lily which is green with brilliant red seed pods. A little flagged path winds round to a rose pergola, and kurrajong trees shelter the flowers from the sun with their delicate and graceful leaves, although they do not monopolise all the decorative effects. Last year the ironbarks (Eucalyptus crebra) blossomed and tossed crowns of white all around the edge of the clearing."

A photograph of the garden shows a shade house on the south-east corner of the front garden, roses, a small palm (the extant Phoenix dactylifera/date palm?) and the encircling wooden fence with the forest beyond.

Ellen Clayton Hume died in 1936, leaving Beulah to the Royal Society for the Prevention of Cruelty to Animals, NSW Branch (RSPCA). She left £1,000, £3 a week allowance and a life interest in the property to her "maid and companion", Sarah Papworth. Sarah, known as "Dolly", was thirteen years younger than Ellen, had known Beulah since childhood. Her father Eddie Tobin had worked full-time for John and Emma Hume, while her mother Harriet had worked for the family. When Harriet died in 1939 she was living with her daughter at Beulah. Sarah's husband David received £1,000 as did Ellen's resident nurse, Sister Helen Timmins. Sarah died in 1960 after which David was entitled to live there under the same terms. He died in 1967, triggering a flurry of activity around the remaining furniture and books, with two female Hume cousins disputing with the RSPCA Trustees over entitlements. Both died before Papworth. Stuart Hume, great-grandson of F. R. Hume, was given authority to take Hume books after Papworth's death. Furniture and other items, silver and china, disappeared. Some were looted, others given away by the RSPCA. A large collection of Hume and Clayton diaries and letters was given to Mrs Shirley Ball who ran the private Colonial House Museum, in Millers Point.

Beulah was formally conveyed to the RSPCA on 3 December 1969. In February 1970 the RSPCA signed an agreement with Northbridge Estates P/L to buy it. By the time Beulah was actually conveyed on 26 February 1971 Northbridge Estates had become Beulah Investments P/L. Beulah was bought as an investment (anticipating Government resumption) following the 1968 new plan to expand metropolitan Sydney, directing growth along three transport corridors. The State Planning Authority began buying land locally in the late 1960s for future industrial and education uses and Housing Commission development. The Macarthur Development Board was established in 1974 to manage the growth centre with authority to acquire and develop land and manage an environmental and heritage conservation program. Federal funding ceased in 1975. The State Government got increasingly unwilling to bear long-term investment costs from land acquisition. In June 1977 the English principals of Beulah Investments P/L were confident it would be resumed. They let it on short leases for grazing and agistment to cover rates. In December 1979 the NSW Planning & Environment Commission advised them that the extent of land had been revised and Beulah released from designation under the Growth Centre Act.

Meanwhile a detailed regional survey of 19th-century buildings and sites was done for the State Planning Authority. Its November 1973 report identified Beulah and the trees known as Humewood as significant and proposed preservation. An edited version was published in March 1977. The National Trust (NSW) did extra research on Beulah's history, classifying it in April 1980.

Through the 1980s Beulah Investments P/L continued to let Beulah to tenants (cattle, horses), turning down a series of prospective buyers. In February 1983 Campbelltown Council proposed an interim conservation order. The PCO was made on 8 April 1983 to the whole of Portion 78. In January 1985 Beulah Investments P/L were given notice of a permanent conservation order, objected, leading to a Commission of Inquiry. The hearing in January and February 1987 decided to proceed with a PCO over two hectares (six acres) – part of Portion 78. The bridge was not thought at risk, so excluded, as was the summer house and 20th century cottage. The National Trust (NSW) classified the bridge in May 1987. Interest was growing in the remnant forest on Portion 77. Campbelltown Council prepared a Development Control Plan to allow part of Beulah to be listed as a local heritage item – to which Beulah Investments P/L objected. Beulah was kept on short-leases for agistment.

In 1993 Campbelltown Council proposed rezoning for a wildlife corridor including Beulah's spotted gum forest. Beulah Investments P/L and neighbouring Mt. Gilead opposed this. George Betts died in 2000, having represented Beulah Investments P/L's interests for 30 years. In April 2000 the Heritage Council wrote to Beulah Investments P/L pointing out that minimum standards of maintenance and repair were not being adhered to, i.e. it was demolition by neglect. In February 2004 Clive Lucas, Stapleton & Partners were contracted for a schedule of essential maintenance to walls, roof, verandah posts.

From September 2010 Beulah was acquired ($2 million; $600,000 through OEH's Biodiversity Offset program and a biobanking agreement to preserve the 60 hectares (150 acres) of significant bushland on site), repaired, adaptively reused and readied for sale by the Historic Houses Trust of NSW through its endangered houses fund. It is being prepared for sale.

== Description ==
=== Farm ===
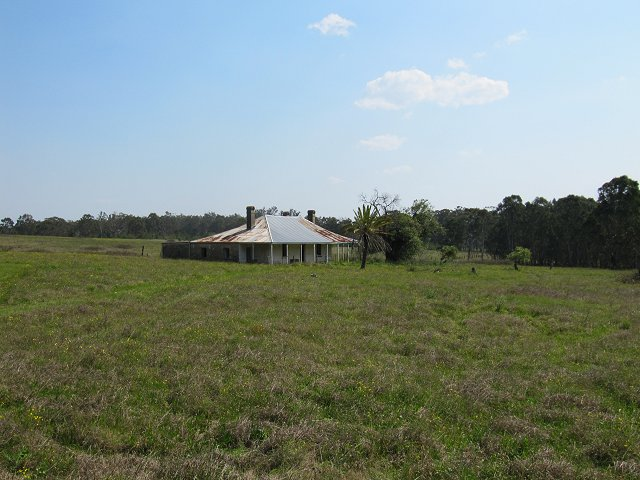
Farm

The property is broadly rectangular running away from Appin Road on its eastern side towards the Upper Canal water supply for Sydney to its west. A driveway winds from Appin Road over Woodhouse Creek through an area of forest, past a former dam and bore and an area of remnant formal planning layout to the homestead group with remnant plants, outbuildings and fence lines. To the north of the homestead group is a dairy. To its south-west is an octagonal summer house ruin. This was deliberately sited in an area giving both the best views and summer breezes. It has a clear relationship to the homestead group and to adjoining Meadowvale homestead group to its south-west – on axis.

On both sides of the driveway which continues west of the homestead group were cultivated paddocks – visible in a 1947 aerial photograph – patterns indicating possible former orchards or pasture improvement in this area. Dams and another area of cultivation patterns in the farm's south-west. Beulah adjoins Meadowvale to its south, another colonial farm estate and this boundary is marked by remaining post and rail fencing.

The house and outbuildings are set within a level basin enclosed in the southern and western sides by the ridgeline and to the north and east by the conservation forest. Only the gazebo (or summer house) is set on the ridgeline overlooking the adjacent (to the south-west) former Hume homestead known as Meadowvale.

The land is largely cleared and shows evidence of continued pastoral use, with the exception of the conservation forest.

=== Forest ===
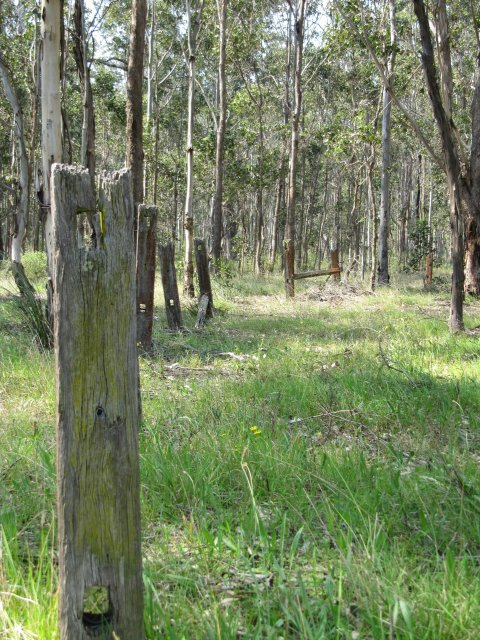
Forest

Approximately 59.5 hectares (147 acres) of the total site area of approximately 90 hectares (220 acres) (65%) of the farm is covered with conservation forest. This forest includes both remnant Cumberland Plain Woodland (c. 19.4 hectares (48 acres)), Sydney Shale Sandstone Transition Forest (c. 40.1 hectares (99 acres)). This forested area coveres 65.65% of the property, including the whole of Lot 21 DP1132464 and portions of the remaining three lots of the site. Both types of vegetation noted above are listed as endangered ecological communities under the NSW Threatened Species Conservation Act 1995. This forest has significance as a rare remnant natural forest with important values in terms of biodiversity for both flora and faujna and as part of the Georges / Nepean River corridors. The conservation forest should be managed as per the recommendations and requirements of the Biobanking Agreement ID no. 058, under Part 7A Division 2 of the Threatened Species Conservation Act 1995. This includes preventing stock from grazing in any area of the biobanking site, regular and ongoing effective control of environmental weeds, management of exotic forbs, grasses and vines, monitoring and review of the weed management plan, management of fire for conservation, management of human disturbance, management of regrowth and remnant vegetation, supplementary planting, retention of dead timber, rocks, erosion control, pest management and nutrient control etc.

=== Bridge over Woodhouse Creek (c. 1836+) ===
The timber beam bridge over Woodhouse Creek on "Beulah" is believed to be the only example of its type in private ownership and the only one known to retain a full set of stringer girders intact. It is a rare remnant of Australia's oldest surviving form of bridge construction. It is approximately 150–200 metres (490–660 ft) from the homestead, negotiating a steep rocky creek. It is believed to be contemporary with the house (1830–1840). Its style of construction is not unlike that employed in some earlier bridges in the Great North Road, north of Wisemans Ferry.

It consists of stone masonry abutments approximately 3 metres (9.8 ft) apart with hardwood stringer girders spanning that distance for a width of approximately 6 metres (20 ft). The original decking no longer exists. The remains of some hand railing exists lying in the grass adjacent to the causeway. The invert of the creek bed is stone faced for the width of the bridge and 1.5 metres (4 ft 11 in) upstream and downstream. Downstream, it discharges into a natural rock pool formation. There is some scouring of the creek bed upstream of the paving.

The abutment walls are coursed rubble stone masonry lime mortar jointed using sandstone blocks. This construction returns along the wing walls which form the sides of both approach causeways. At a distance along the causeway the mortar jointed masonry gives way to dry walling roughly coursed. At the top of the abutment walls and for a distance along the causeway walls a course of stone is recessed forming a shelf to carry a 225 square broad axed (or adzed) timber plate. At the abutments this is used to land the timber bridge stringers and along the causeway it is used to support the handrail posts.

The stringers extend beyond the abutment headstock approximately 900 millimetres (35 in) along the causeway. Seven stringers 225 x 225 at 900 centres form the width of the bridge. These were originally decked with 150 x 60 hardwood planks all of which have been removed between abutments and have been replaced with a modern carriageway consisting of timber decking over railway lines as stringers occupying the centre 3-metre (9.8 ft) width of the bridge. The remains of a handrail lies in the grass on the south side of the wrought iron strap securing the rail to the top of the post clearly visible. The wrought iron fish plate connecting the butted ends of the side plates is also lying on the site. The remains of bolts between stringers, side plates and headstock are also in place in corroded form as are a number of wrought iron spikes and nails.

Building material: stone masonry abutments, hardwood stringer girders

Significant landscape elements including the garden

Significant landscape features include the:

- conservation forest;
- original access road;
- remnants of 19th-century plantings (including a date palm (Phoenix dactylifera), peppercorn trees (Schinus molle var. areira) and a clump of an old rose R. bracteata);

as well as remnants of the:

- round yard (former carriageway (loop) east of the house;
- fencing; and
- two 19th-century dams.

There are several areas of remnant early post and rail fences around the site.

Remains of (later) extensive picket fence and carriage loop. A kurrajong (Brachychiton populneum), date palm (Phoenix dactylifera) and peppercorn tree (Schinus molle var. areira) are to the front/east of the house. A formal garden was/remains on the eastern side of the house and outbuildings to its west or rear.

=== House (c. 1836) and outbuildings ===
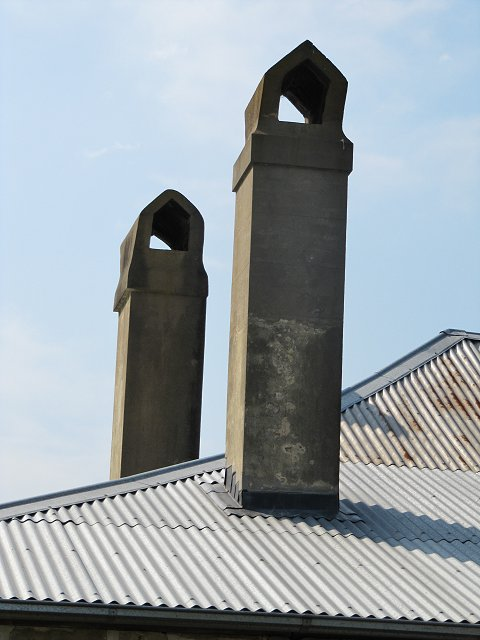
Chimneys

A single storey, Colonial Georgian style, three bay symmetrical homestead of coursed random stone construction. Double pitched roof (now corrugated iron) and stone flagged verandah. Principle eastern facade has a stucco and ashlar finish. The interior comprises a typical four room arrangement, with two principal rooms and two back rooms arranged around a central hall. It also features four "strangers" rooms' or verandah rooms, accessed externally, two off the front verandah and two off the rear, with an attached store at its south-western corner. Three chimneys, two to the north, one to the south.

Store (attached at south-west corner of house)

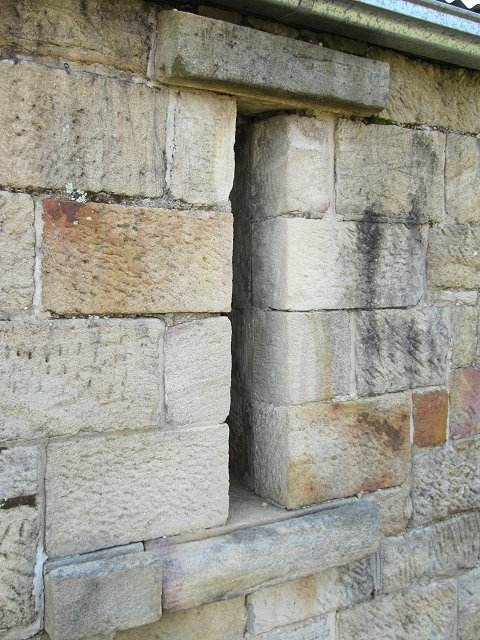
Slit window, possibly for defensive purposes

Rear flat roofed addition has a slit window (for defensive reasons ?). Attached dairy and the picket fence has been destroyed in recent years. House, weatherboard outbuildings and the gazebo have deteriorated to ruinous state in recent years.

Built by John Kennedy Hume in the 1830s. Single storey three bay symmetrical homestead of coursed random stone rubble construction, stuccoed to front. Central corridor, two principal rooms with fireplaces, reeded or fluted chimney pieces intact, back hall, two back rooms, stone paved verandah to front returning on sides to two small corner verandah rooms, all under a double pitched hipped roof (now covered with corrugated galvanised iron).

Building Material

Coursed random stone rubble (stuccoed in part), reeded or fluted chimney pieces.

19th century outbuildings (c. 1839–40; 1880s (gazebo/summer house)

These include Cottage 1, the former Stables, former Gazebo / summer house and remnant structures. The majority of these buildings on this site were built between 1835–38. They were described in contemporary descriptions in 1839 and 1840. Outbuildings are in various stages of disrepair and are derelict.

Cottage 1

Timber, located southwest of the house.

Former stables

Timber, located south of Cottage 1.

Cottage 2

Remnant chimney remains nearby to former stables.

Dairy

To the north of the homestead group is an attached dairy with stone slab floor.

Gazebo / Summer House (c. 1880s)

To the south-west of house, Cottage 1 and former Stables, located on the ridgeline. Collapsed, timber hexagonal structure with corrugated iron roof.

=== Condition ===
As at 3 February 2015, the house is derelict and vandalized. On a derelict and poor condition overall and large sections of the ceilings and floors have collapsed. The condition of the masonry structures is generally fair to good, although some cracking and bowing of masonry walls is evident. The northwest corner has been reconstructed and various sections of the sandstone to the southern and western facades have been repointed with cementitious mortars. Much of the corrugated iron on the house's roof is recent, with older sections remaining at the north-eastern corner and upper north-western corner.

For the bridge over Woodhouse Creek, the western headstock has been damaged by termite infestation and has collapsed. The eastern headstock has probably been damaged as is evident by inspection of the ends but collapse has not occurred. The "second" headstocks are buried and could not be inspected beyond the ends which show some evidence of termite damage. Further exploration would be required to confirm this. The top surface of the stringers shows moderate to extensive weathering forming vertical fissures typical of water damage at the interface between decking and girders. The condition of all timbers is remarkably good considering their age.

=== Modifications and dates ===
- 1823 – 81 hectares (200 acres) in four lots
- 1846 – 49 hectares (120 acres)
- 1884 – repairs and renovations (including: old kitchen being cleared away and foundation being laid for a new one. Summer house was likely erected about this time.
- 1969–70+ – It has since been neglected and left to be ransacked. Early post and rail fencing was removed and sold for firewood.
- A plan of the remnant garden by John Tropman in 1983 documents the extant plant material from that time in the immediate vicinity of the house although the layout is more formal than suggested in the *1934 article – The garden has continued to deteriorate and the summerhouse has now completely collapsed.
- 1980 – a fire destroyed some of the detached buildings.
- c. 1980 – photos of the various outbuildings show three large water tanks, one behind the SW of the house, one behind the timber building on the S end; one behind the NW end of the house. These were destroyed by a fire in 1980, apparently caused by a kerosene refrigerator.
- c. 2005 – north-west corner of homestead building reconstructed.
- 2010–11 – Beulah acquired and repaired, adaptively reused and readied for sale by the Historic Houses Trust of NSW, under their endangered houses fund. The property is currently on the real estate market.

=== Further information ===
The Appin area has been subject to frequent archaeological study over the last 20 years. Previous works have revealed that sandstone rock shelters and overhangs containing art are the most commonly occurring site type.

Four rock shelter sites have been recorded by the Sydney Prehistory Group to the north of Woodhouse Creek. The closest of these was found 400 metres (1,300 ft) from the northern curtilage (boundary) of Beulah. The subject site was characterised by areas of high, moderate and low archaeological sensitivity. Areas of high archaeological sensitivity were identified in association with Woodhouse Creek and its tributaries. Areas of moderate archaeological sensitivity were identified across large portions of the western portion of the study area, including the two ridge crest landforms and the associated gently sloping landform associated with the Beulah homestead.

The 2013 artefact report categoriesd the property into areas of low, moderate and high archaeological potential. Much was assessed to be of low potential as a large proportion of the land are unlikely to have been suitable for construction of buildings due to the topography of the land and distance from the house. The report identified three areas of moderate potential which include a large area surrounding the house and including all extant structures, the site of the gazebo, which has some potential to contain artefacts and an area including a post and rail fence line and dam which has some potential to include evidence related to water irrigation and farming in the area. The artefact report reveals there are two areas of high archaeological potential. One is the site of the house and its immediate surroundings, known to include the remains of former structures and underfloor artefact deposits and garden features such as garden bed edging. The second is the driveway and bridge, which are known to include evidence for sandstone and brick road surfacing, and methods of construction used for the bridge and road approaches.

== Heritage listing ==
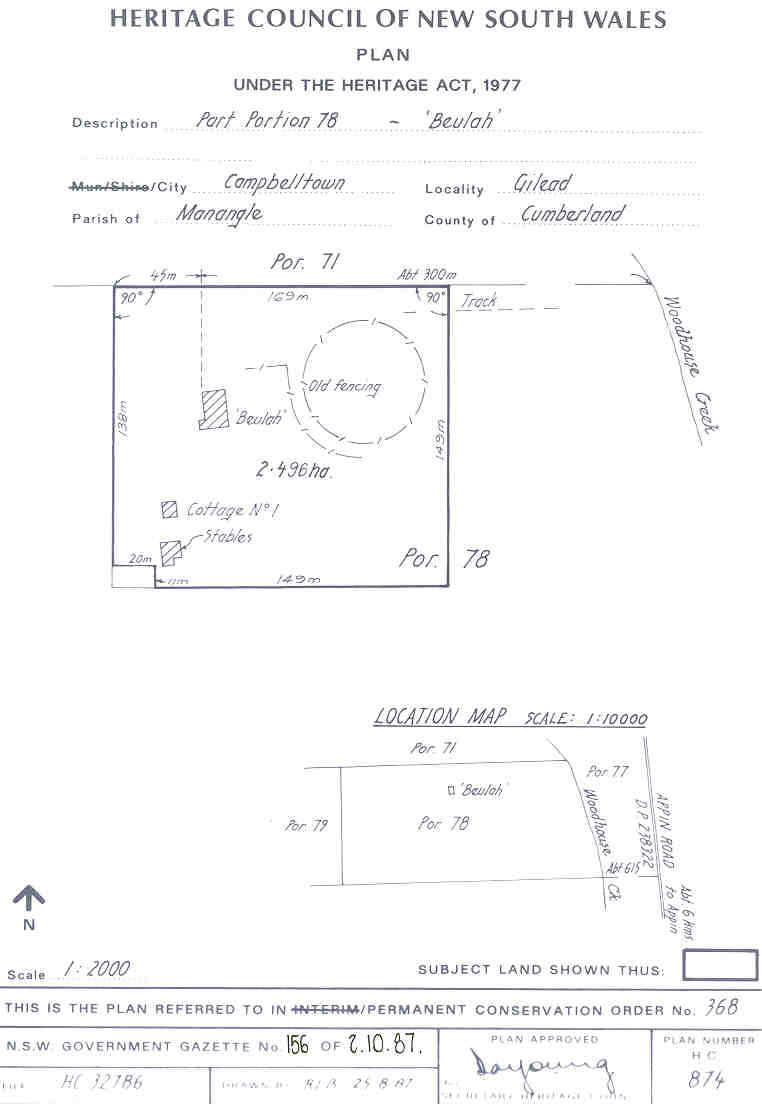
added heritage boundary map

As at 20 March 2009, the Beulah estate is important as an entire cultural landscape containing early colonial structures – homestead group and stone bridge – remnant 19th century farm and garden layout, an octagonal pavilion or summer house as a major focal element and a remnant spotted gum (Corymbia maculata) forest as a result of early conservation planning.

Beulah was listed on the New South Wales State Heritage Register on 2 April 1999.

== See also ==
- List of heritage houses in Sydney
