= Rosemeadow =

- Suburb
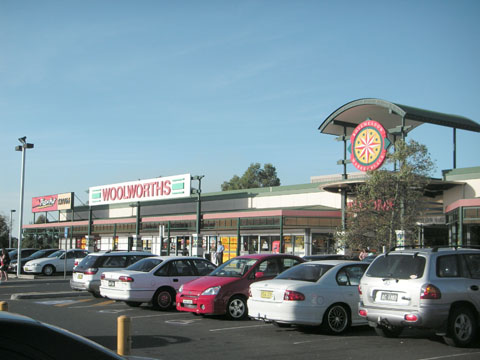
- An old picture of Rosemeadow Marketplace, possibly from 2007 or 2008

- Interactive map of Rosemeadow
- Country: Australia
- State: New South Wales
- City: Sydney
- LGA: City of Campbelltown
- Location: 45 km (28 mi) south-west of Sydney
- Established: 1976

Government
  - State electorate: Campbelltown
  - Federal division: Macarthur
- Elevation: 135 m (443 ft)

Population
  - Total: 8,007 (2021 census)
- Postcode: 2560
Suburbs around Rosemeadow
Glen Alpine	Ambarvale	Bradbury
Gilead	Rosemeadow	St Helens Park
Gilead	Figtree Hill	Wedderburn

Rosemeadow is a suburb of Sydney, in the state of New South Wales, Australia. Rosemeadow is located around 45 kilometres south-west of the Sydney central business district, in the local government area of the City of Campbelltown and is part of the Macarthur region.

== History ==
Rosemeadow owes its name to early settler Thomas Rose, who in 1818 bought a farm called Mount Gilead which covered parts of modern-day Rosemeadow and neighbouring Gilead. Rose was a baker and publican as well as a farmer, building a mill on his property and a couple of large dams which helped him and his neighbours survive the drought of 1829.

The area remained farmland until the mid-1970s when Sydney's urban sprawl reached it and the suburb was officially named in 1976, although development didn't start until the 1980s. The Rosemeadow public housing estate used the American Radburn design for public housing which turns houses around so they back on to streets with the fronts facing each other. This design has been criticised in Sydney as contributing to social problems and following an incident of street violence in 2009 orders were made to partially demolish the estate. Since the partial demolishing of the suburb, the streets have begun to be renamed, and the Radburn design abandoned.

Streets in Rosemeadow are named after characters from the works of William Shakespeare, such as:

- Hamlet Crescent
- Macbeth Way
- Othello Avenue
- Donalbain Circuit
- Romeo Crescent
- Juliet Close
- Cleopatra Drive
- Anthony Drive
- Antonio Close
- Desdemona Street

== Commercial area ==
Rosemeadow Marketplace, built in 1993, is on the corner of both Copperfield Drive and Fitzgibbon Lane, and is also on the corner of Thomas Rose Drive and Copperfield Drive, is a medium-sized shopping centre. The local post office sits within the Marketplace and nearby is a community health centre, fire station, high school and an Anglican church.

== 2009 Rosemeadow Brawl/Riots ==
On 5 January 2009, at midnight, a brawl broke out on MacBeth Way, with 20 people participating and 80 onlookers. 7 people were injured, including 3 who were stabbed, 2 who were shot and 2 with mild head injuries, and 4 people taken into custody, including two 16 year olds, another man charged with stabbing two men aged 20 and 29, and an 18 year old charged with affray. A stash of possible weapons including tree branches, bottles, and bricks while delivering letters telling residents to co-operate with police or face eviction. The brawl caused the demolition of MacBeth Way, with the last resident moving on 21 December 2009, and the Radburn design to be abadoned and the yards of homes switched over on both Malcom and Macduff Way.

== Schools ==
John Therry Catholic High School is the oldest school in the suburb, having opened in 1981. Next door is its feeder school, Our Lady Help of Christians Parish School. Public schools include Rosemeadow Public School (opened 1986), Ambarvale High (opened 1984) and Mary Brooksbank Special School (opened 1992). The oldest school built in the suburb is Rosemeadow Public School, located on Anthony and Copperfield Drive.

== Parks & Reserves ==
There are a number of parks and reserves within or boarding Rosemeadow. These are:

- Canidius Reserve
- Octavia Reserve
- Demetrius Reserve
- Greco Reserve
- Flagstaff Reserve
- Oswald Reserve
- Heydon Park
- Rizal Park
- Rosemeadow Reserve

== Transport ==
Rosemeadow can be accessed via Appin Road or via surrounding suburbs of Ambarvale and Glen Alpine. The main road passing through Rosemeadow would be Copperfield drive. The suburb is serviced by Transit Systems buses, which provide links to Macarthur and Campbelltown railway stations as well as occasional services to Appin and Wollongong via the 888 and 887 buses.

== Notable people ==
- Alanna Kennedy, current Matildas and Sydney FC footballer
- Marcelo Montoya, current Canterbury-Bankstown Bulldogs and Fiji Bati player

== Demographics ==
According to the 2021 census, Rosemeadow had a population of 8,007 people.
