= Uther (disambiguation) =

Uther was a legendary king of sub-Roman Britain and the father of King Arthur.

Uther may also refer to:

== People ==
Notable people with the surname Uther include:

- Johan Baptista van Uther (died 1597), Dutch painter active in Sweden
- Reuben Uther (1791–1880), Australian merchant and manufacturer
- Hans-Jörg Uther (born 1944), German literary scholar and 2010 winner of the Brothers Grimm Prize of the University of Marburg

== Fictional entities ==
- Lord Uther, a character in Fire Emblem
- Lord Uther the Lightbringer, a character in the Warcraft universe

== Other uses ==
- HMS Uther, a British submarine
- Uther, a 2001 novel by Jack Whyte
- Uther, an alien on Natural History of an Alien
