= Thomas Rose (died 1837) =

British convict settler in New South Wales

Thomas Rose (died 3 March 1837) was an early pioneer in the settlement of the British colony in New South Wales, Australia. After being transported from Britain for housebreaking, he established himself as first a baker, and then later a publican in Sydney. His grant and purchase of land in the Campbelltown area saw some of the earliest water conservation for agriculture in the colony, and the construction of one of the country's first windmills.

There was more than one Thomas Rose who played a pioneering role in the New South Wales colony. For the purposes of distinguishing them, this one is often known as Thomas Rose of Mount Gilead.

== Early life ==
Rose was transported as a convict to New South Wales for breaking and entering. A fact he denied, to perpetuate a myth that he migrated as a free settler.

== Baker and publican ==
In 1810, Rose received a land grant on the south-east corner of King and (what is now) Castlereagh streets in Sydney, where he built a bakery, and the neighbouring Rose and Crown Inn. He held horse races in a neighbouring paddock, dubbed Roses Paddock

== Mount Gilead ==
Rose is closely associated with water conservation, and pioneering the land surrounding Campbelltown. He also built a windmill on the Mount Gilead estate.

== Legacy ==
Thomas Rose died at Mount Gilead in 1837. He was buried on the estate, and his remains were later transferred to St Peter's Anglican Cemetery in Campbelltown, where a monument stands.

The suburb of Rosemeadow is named after him, as is Thomas Rose Drive in that suburb.

== See also ==
- Rosemeadow
- Gilead, New South Wales
