= Sugarloaf Farm =

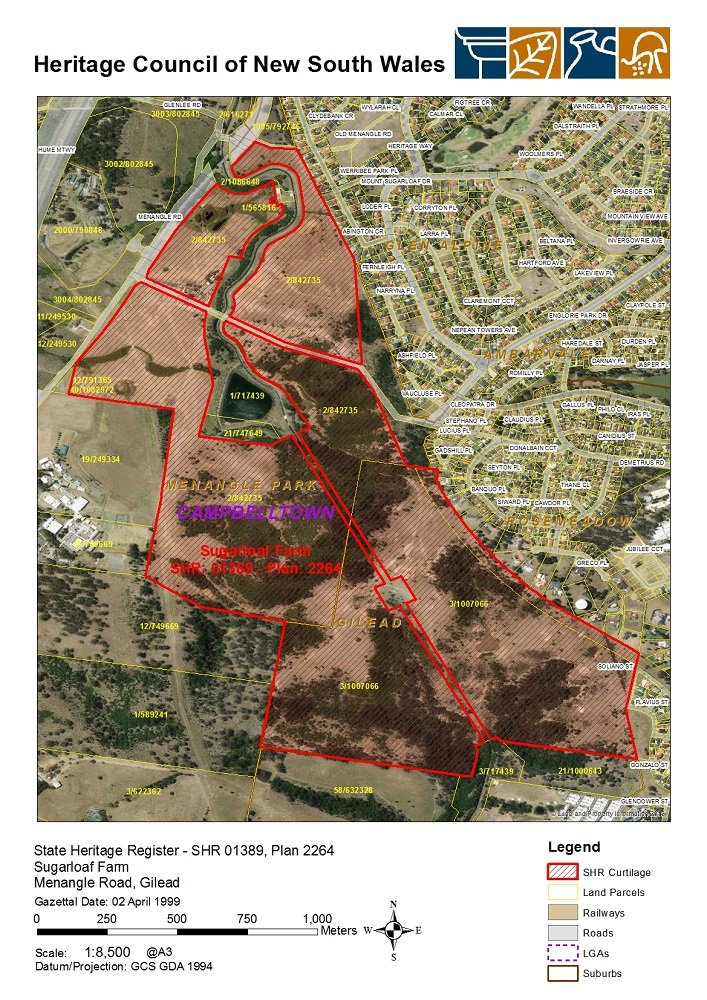
- Heritage boundaries

- Location within Sydney Location within Australia
- 34°06′06″S 150°46′33″E
- Location: Menangle Road, Gilead, City of Campbelltown, New South Wales, Australia

History
- Built: 1835–

Site notes
- Owner: Department of Planning and Infrastructure

New South Wales Heritage Register
- Official name: Sugarloaf Farm; Mt Huon
- Type: State heritage (landscape)
- Designated: 2 April 1999
- Reference no.: 1389
- Type: Farm
- Category: Farming and Grazing

Sugarloaf Farm is a heritage-listed former dairy, wheat farming and pastoral property and now residence and horse riding venue located at Menangle Road, Gilead, City of Campbelltown, New South Wales, Australia. It was designed and built from 1835. It is also known as Mt Huon. The property is owned by the New South Wales Department of Planning and Infrastructure. It was added to the New South Wales State Heritage Register on 2 April 1999.

== History ==
=== Aboriginal landscape, pre 1788 ===
The original inhabitants of the Campbelltown area were mostly people of the Tharawal (sometimes referred to as Dharawal) language group, who ranged from the coast to the east, the Georges River in the west, north to Botany Bay and south to Nowra. However Campbelltown was a meeting point with the Dharug language group (whose area extended across the Blue Mountains) and early history of the area includes references to both peoples. With establishment of the convict colony in Sydney in 1788 the displacement of Aboriginal people began. A smallpox epidemic decimated many of the coastal clans, but was less destructive amongst the inland peoples.

Escaped cattle from the convict settlement moved south and bred in the Campbelltown/Camden area and after their (re-) discovery in 1795, the area became known as the "Cow Pastures" (or Cowpasture). In 1805 John Macarthur obtained a grant of 2,023 hectares (5,000 acres) (later expanded to 4,047 hectares (10,000 acres)) in the area, some of the best grazing land then known in the colony.

=== 1788–1802 early European exploration ===
Displacement of Aboriginal population

Though peaceful, the Tharawal people bore the brunt of a punitive expedition led by Captain James Wallis in 1816. At least 14 Tharawal people were massacred at Appin, to the distress of sympathetic settlers such as Throsby of Glenfield. Corroborees and other ceremonies continued under the protection of the Macarthurs of Camden Park, though numbers steadily declined.

1804–09 early European land grants

By 1809 34 settlers had received grants in the newly named Minto district (named after Lord Minto, the Governor-General of India) in the northern portion of Campbelltown. Many of these were Irish, including surveyor James Meehan, who allocated himself a generous portion (now Macquarie Fields). Prominent settlers included Charles Throsby, who was allocated 202 hectares (500 acres) (now Glenfield), Dr. William Redfern (Campbellfield), Dr. John Townson (Varroville (homestead)) and Richard Brooks (Denham Court).

As the district became more densely settled a town was needed further south than Liverpool. Campbelltown was formally established in 1820 and named in honour of Mrs Elizabeth Macquarie's maiden name, Campbell. In 1826 the town plan was formalised.

=== Sugarloaf Farm ===
What later became "Sugarloaf Farm" comprises a number of colonial, smaller land holdings, later consolidated under one title. Of the original farm only the holdings of James Mumford and John Smith form part of the present property. Crown grants in the southern portion of the district had not yet consolidated and were still operating as separate holdings. The alignment of Menangle Road has since been altered, re-defining the boundaries of these properties.

Relevant grants for Sugarloaf Farm include James Mumford (40 acres, north-east corner); John Masterson (50 acres, adjoining to south); John Smith (50 acres, adjoining to south) - all of these only just overlapping SLFarm's eastern boundary.

=== Introduction of grazing and cropping ===
Formation of Beehive Farm, 1831

Brothers James and William Bean, granted 80 acres each along old alignment of Menangle Road. In 1835 Paul Huon and George Taber also received grants to the south (covering between the four grants, approximately half of the present SLFarm curtilage). At this time, the property boundaries of many individual holdings particularly on the southern side of Menangle Road, were defined by quince (Cydonia oblonga) and boxthorn (Lycium ferocissimum) hedges, a defining feature of the area during this time.

=== Further exploration, 1833–34 ===
Beehive Farm to Sugarloaf Farm, 1837

Paul Huon to his widow Jane (1856), to William Chapman (renaming the property Mountain View) (1859), to Jon Vardy (Springdale Cottage and Farm (1871).

=== Introduction of dairying (1870s–) ===
Construction of the Sydney Water Canal, 1888 resumption of a corridor through the present Sugarloaf Farm in 1901. By 1916 all the land to the north and east of the present boundary had been sold under separate titles. The curtilage of the remaining portion remained unchanged until the 1970s. In 1903 a significant portion was resumed through the centre of the property to construct the Sydney Water Canal (now called the Upper Canal). This construction redefined the cultural landscape of the property and remains a prominent feature of the site.

Change in ownership, 1929

Sold to James Carroll, prominent dairy farmer.

Subsequent ownership, 1970–2001

Macarthur Regional Development Board acquired the property off the Carroll family in the 1970s as part of urban expansion programme. The portion containing Sugarloaf Farm was passed to the Department of Environment and Planning for conservation and long term management. All dairying ceased at this time and the property was used to agist cattle.

Since the 1940s the farm has been leased for grazing and recreation.

By 1986 the DEP had leased it to Phil Macleod for grazing and recreational purposes.

In 1999 the southeastern tip was subdivided off. The subject property currently accommodates Sugarloaf Riding School, which is managed by Brian Maynard. The homestead's current tenants have been based there for more than 20 years and run an equestrian school that is open to the public for horse riding and horse agistment.

== Description ==
=== Farm ===
The present day Sugarloaf Farm is what remains of a once-extensive property located in the Menangle district. The remainder of the farm (apart from what follows below) is fenced in a series of paddocks, which are used for horse grazing and agistment. The landscape is one of gently undulating hills rising from the floodplain of the Nepean River basin with Mount Sugarloaf being the main topographical feature. The land was extensively cleared for various pastoral uses in the 19th century and little native vegetation has survived, although some regeneration of the indigenous grey box (Eucalyptus moluccana)/Ironbark (E.crebra) Woodland is occurring on the more inaccessible areas of the site. Introduced African olives (Olea europaea var.cuspidata) are rampant on the steeper gradients, particularly on Mount Sugarloaf. Fencing is generally of late 20th century construction, although a few post-and-rail fences from the late 19th century have survived.

The Sydney Water Supply (Upper) Canal is a prominent feature in the landscape, dividing the property with its serpentine form that follows a contour line around the hillside. This is a dominant feature of the north-west views from Mount Sugarloaf and is a well-constructed, and significant example of early 20th century engineering.

=== Garden and inner paddock ===
A small remnant garden surrounds the house and the large paddock in front of the house provides a buffer between it and the recently realigned Menangle Road.

=== Farm complex ===
The former dairy, stables and associated slip rails are located to the south-west of the homestead, on the main drive leading from Menangle Road. These structures are of mixed provenance, ranging from mid-19th century through to late 20th century.

=== Farm homestead ===
The homestead is set well back from Menangle Road, on a slight rise, with the main elevation facing the road. It is a c. 1835 stone walled cottage with weatherboard additions to east (a room the entire width of the four-roomed stone cottage) and north (three rooms and an outdoor toilet). A timber verandah protects its western "front" elevation. The stone cottage section includes an attic storey in the roof.

External walls enclosing spaces 01–05 are c.18 in (460 mm) solid sandstone, built from large blocks in rough but even courses of c.13 in (330 mm). Sills, lintels and stones around openings and at corners are more neatly dressed. On the south wall the bottom of W.15 has been modified, indicating this was originally a door, the lintel is original. The window W.11 has been cut into the wall and the reveals been rendered. The sill shows evidence of modification to the course around it. There is no lintel. The bulk of the north wall has been covered by the weatherboard additions.

The homestead has a steeply pitched gabled roof with a small stone skillion to the rear, a further rear addition (in asbestos cement cladding with a cement floor) from the 1950s and an 1880s verandah addition (recently rebuilt) to the front. It has been extended by a gabled weatherboard addition to the side of the house and a smaller attached timber skillion addition, both dating to the 1880s period.

c. 1905 additions to the north of the cottage are timber stud-framed with nominally 1 in × 6 in (25 mm × 152 mm) lapped timber weatherboards with a chamfered edge. This is ranked as of high heritage significance. The western verandah enclosure to the south-west is in a similar type of board to the northern addition, and was contemporary with it (c. 1905) until the verandah was reconstructed in the 1980s.

c. 1950s additions to the east of the cottage is framed with studs and lined externally with a scalloped timber board approximately 150 x 19mm.

The roof is a simple gabled structure clad with short sheet corrugated iron. Under the iron are timber shingles.

=== Condition ===
As at 29 November 2016, to be completed – CP underway

=== Modifications and dates ===
- To be completed – CP underway.
- 1950s: verandahs were reconstructed, but retain some 1880s fabric (of considerable significance).

== Heritage listing ==
As at 4 March 1999, Sugarloaf Farm is a largely intact farm complex dating from the 1840s through to the 1940s and demonstrating a range of uses throughout its life. The main homestead represents the first phase of use of the site for cereal cropping and the associated outbuildings represent various changes of use to dairying (1890s), horse and cattle studding (1940s) and riding school (1980s). The site has retained much of its original setting allowing a high degree of interpretation of the historic landscape.

Sugarloaf Farm is of State Significance for its association with the early settlement and development of Menangle as a farming district. The farm has high historical, visual, aesthetic and research value as a remnant of an earlier cultural landscape. The surviving rural landscape setting has cultural significance due to its ability to demonstrate important aspects of the early European occupation such as early plantings, paddocks, fences, early grant areas and some archaeological features and sites.

The farm is of state significance as it exhibits characteristics typical to Cumberland Plain colonial landscapes and setting, which are becoming increasingly rare in the Sydney region due to the pressure of modern urban development. The farm buildings themselves are amongst a declining number of rural groups surviving in the area, now part of the urban development edge of Campbelltown.

The farmstead complex has high visual and aesthetic value, located in a prominent position and retaining elements of their original setting and a relationship to Menangle Road and the rural setting to the west and south.

The farmhouse is of State significance as a good example of Colonial farmhouse in the Georgian style retaining much of its original form and fabric. The 1880s-1900 additions to the buildings allow interpretation and the changing needs of its occupants.

The late nineteenth century farm buildings, particularly the remnant dairy, allow interpretation of a prosperous rural holding and demonstrate the changing farming practices and land usage of the district over a period of 160 years.

Sugarloaf Farm was listed on the New South Wales State Heritage Register on 2 April 1999 having satisfied the following criteria.

The place is important in demonstrating the course, or pattern, of cultural or natural history in New South Wales.

Sugarloaf Farm is significant for its role in the early settlement and development of Menangle as a farming district. The farm has a continuity of pastoral use over 160 years representing a pattern of use that is becoming rare in the area due to urban expansion. The stone farmhouse is a good example of a mid-Colonial rural dwelling, sited to take advantage of aspect and views. The dairy and associated structures are good examples of late nineteenth century to early twentieth century farm buildings associated with the once successful dairying interests of the property.

The farm is associated with several prominent families such as the Bean, Taber and Huon families who were instrumental in the development of the district and the establishment of the farming activities, which characterised the area for over a century.

The farm has retained extensive views of adjoining properties, particularly from Mount Sugarloaf, including "Glenlee" to the west, allowing interpretation of an earlier cultural landscape.

A number of cultural plantings have survived, providing a connection to the early development of the farm and the Camden area generally. These include the Pepper trees and African Boxthorn hedges.

The farm contains a section of the Sydney Water Supply Canal in its historic curtilage. The canal forms a significant part of the site and represents the political vision and planning of the time to overcome acute water supply problems faced by the city. Being part of the extensive dam building and irrigation works associated with the Nepean River Scheme, it represents an immense engineering achievement of the time, which eventually redefined the cultural landscape of the property.

The place has a strong or special association with a person, or group of persons, of importance of cultural or natural history of New South Wales's history.

The farm has high significance for the pioneering role of the Bean, Taber and Huon families in the area, particularly in the area of agriculture and for its association with James Bean, a colonial carpenter who worked on the second Judges Advocate's house.

The place is important in demonstrating aesthetic characteristics and/or a high degree of creative or technical achievement in New South Wales.

The house has high aesthetic value for its form, its sitting, its well detailed and executed stonework and the competence and general integrity of the detailing. The surviving early interior joinery, believed to be the work of James Bean, is of high value.

The house has high aesthetic value as a simple rustic rural dwelling, representative of modest Colonial Georgian architecture.

The sitting of the house and outbuildings, originally surrounded by a network of similar holdings, provides a striking setting at the foot of Mount Sugarloaf.

The farm has retained extensive views, particularly to the west, allowing a high degree of interpretation of an earlier cultural landscape, specifically by demonstrating the relationship between Sugarloaf Farm and the other large holdings in the area dating from the mid-Colonial period.

The farm lands have high aesthetic value through their demonstration of varying land uses over a long period of time. The contrast between areas of naturally regenerating woodland and open paddocks has been compromised by later land uses but is still evident and reflects some of the early character of the farm.

Although the introduction of Olives in the early twentieth century as hedging plant has devastated most of what remained of the native vegetation and obliterated evidence of earlier cultural plantings, some significant cultural plantings relating to the early settlement of grants in the area have survived. These include specifically, the pepper trees which are important cultural markers and the remnants of African Boxthorn which was used as a hedging plant to mark grant and paddock boundaries in the mid-Colonial and early-Victorian periods. These add to the aesthetic quality of the landscape.

The place has a strong or special association with a particular community or cultural group in New South Wales for social, cultural or spiritual reasons.

The site has strong associations with the local community as an early rural farm. The farm has always occupied a significant position in the district, clearly identifiable by Mount Sugarloaf and originally formed part of a network of similar holdings established during the same period.

The property is associated with several prominent families in the district, most particularly the Taber, Bean and Huon families. All three families were instrumental in the settlement and development of the district in its early years and James Bean has a wider association with the development of the colony through his work as a carpenter.

The place has potential to yield information that will contribute to an understanding of the cultural or natural history of New South Wales.

The 1830s fabric demonstrates Colonial construction techniques and use of materials.

The 1880s fabric demonstrates construction techniques and material usage of the Victorian period.

The holding demonstrates changing farm practices and land uses over a long period of time and their effects on both the cultural and native landscape.

The various changes to the house demonstrate the evolution of a small but successful farm and the changing needs of its occupants.

The surviving cultural plantings demonstrate the early uses of introduced species and particularly their uses as cultural and boundary markers.

The farm has scientific potential in terms of the few archaeological sites, which may relate to earlier farm sites on some of the early grants.

The farm house and the remnant dairies are also potentially important in terms of their historical archaeology.

The place possesses uncommon, rare or endangered aspects of the cultural or natural history of New South Wales.

Sugarloaf exhibits characteristics atypical to Cumberland Plain colonial landscapes, which are becoming increasingly rare in the Sydney region due to the pressure of modern urban development. Few of the major holdings in the area, from the same period of settlement, have survived. The notable exceptions are "Glenlee" and "Mt Gilead in the immediate area, and the "Camden Park Estate". None of the smaller holdings, which originally formed the Sugarloaf Farm consolidation appear to have survived and very few traces of the existence of these smaller holdings can be discerned in the present landscape. The farm generally and the house, in particular, exhibit a degree of intactness allowing interpretation of the site's history and former occupation.

The place is important in demonstrating the principal characteristics of a class of cultural or natural places/environments in New South Wales.

The house, dairy and associated structures are representative of farm buildings of their respective periods. The farmhouse building is a typical Colonial rural dwelling and is well designed and executed.

The farmhouse and outbuildings are representative of the first period of settlement in the district. They are key focal elements of the early pastoral landscape and indicate the early development of the district.
