= William Day (Australian politician) =

Australian politician

Member of the New South Wales Legislative Council
- In office 13 May 1861 – 13 May 1861

Alderman of the Sydney Municipal Council
- In office 17 May 1869 – 30 November 1875

Personal details
- Born: 21 February 1825 Sydney, Australia
- Died: 8 November 1887 (aged 62) Paddington
- Spouse(s): Anne Gertrude Souter married 1859
- Children: 6 sons, 1 daughter
- Occupation: Boat-builder

William Day (21 February 1825 – 8 November 1887) was an Australian politician and boatbuilder.

He was one of Charles Cowper's 21 appointments to the New South Wales Legislative Council in May 1861, but never took his seat.

Day was the son of Thomas Day (1795–1868) and Susannah, née Stubbs (died 1833) and was born on 21 February 1825 in Sydney. In 1859 he married Anne Gertrude Souter. Together they had a daughter and 6 sons.

He was an Alderman on the Sydney Municipal Council between 1869 and 1875, representing the Brisbane Ward,

Day also officiated as returning officer at the Hyde Park hustings.

Day died on 8 November 1887 at Paddington.
