= Gilead, New South Wales =

Gilead
- Suburb
- Interactive map of Gilead
- Country: Australia
- State: New South Wales
- City: Sydney
- LGA: City of Campbelltown
- Location: 58 km (36 mi) south-west of Sydney CBD; 54 km (34 mi) north-east of Mittagong

Government
  - State electorate: Campbelltown
  - Federal division: Macarthur
- Elevation: 159 m (522 ft)

Population
  - Total: 882 (2021 census)
- Postcode: 2560
Suburbs around Gilead
Glen Alpine	Figtree Hill	St Helens Park
Menangle Park	Gilead	Wedderburn
Menangle	Appin	Wedderburn

Gilead (/ɡɪliəd/) is a suburb of Sydney, in the state of New South Wales, Australia. Gilead is located 58 kilometres south-west of the Sydney central business district, in the local government area of the City of Campbelltown and is part of the Macarthur region.

== History ==
Gilead was a land named in the Bible and famed for its fields of wheat. It obviously seemed like an ideal name for a wheat farm when Reuban Uther was granted 400 acres (1.6 km^{2}) in 1812 but Uther only persisted with his dream for six years before selling the estate.

The purchaser was Thomas Rose who renamed it Mount Gilead. Rose lived and farmed the estate from 1818 until his death in 1837. The estate was inherited by his son Henry Rose, until the foreclosure by the mortgagees in 1862.

In 1941, the land was bought by the Macarthur-Onslow family, owners of nearby Camden Park Estate, who still own it today. While there has been talk of suburban development, Gilead remains farmland just beyond the edge of suburbia.

== Heritage listings ==
Gilead has a number of heritage-listed sites, including:

- 767 Appin Road: Beulah, Gilead
- Menangle Road: Sugarloaf Farm
