= Reuben Uther =

Australian merchant and manufacturer

- Born: 27 March 1791; England
- Died: 10 July 1880 (aged 89)
- Citizenship: Australian
- Occupations: Merchant and manufacturing

Reuben Uther (27 March 1791 – 10 July 1880) was a noted Australian merchant and manufacturer.

== Biography ==
Born in England, Uther began his career in seal skins before emigrating to Sydney in 1807 where he founded a hat making industry, a region of industry that he subsequently monopolised. He was a signatory to the petition to Major George Johnston calling for the deposing of the Governor of New South Wales, William Bligh, having only lived in the country for one year.

Awarded a 400 acre ground by Governor Lachlan Macquarie in 1812 during the fallout from the Rum Rebellion, Uther expanded his interests to include agriculture – specifically meat production. Admired for his innovative farming techniques in Australia, Uther unsuccessfully petitioned the British Colonial Office during a visit back to England for the government to bequeath him more land upon which to farm. He married in 1812, though he was widowed in 1829 when his wife accidentally drowned. He expanded his industrial interests to include that of ironmongery and mining, and married a second time. Upon his death in 1880 his estate valued at 250,000 pounds sterling.
